= Top =

Top most commonly refers to:

- Top, a basic term of orientation, distinguished from bottom, front, back, and sides
- Spinning top, a ubiquitous traditional toy
- Top (clothing), designed to be worn over the torso
- Mountain top, a mountain peak located at some distance from the nearest point of higher elevation

Top may also refer to:

== Geography ==
- Top, any subsidiary summit of a munro
- Proper names of geographical features:
  - Top River, tributary of the Olt, in Romania
  - Top, Oghuz, a village in Azerbaijan
  - Top, Zangilan, a village near Zangilan, Azerbaijan

== People ==
- Top (surname)
- Noordin Mohammad Top (1968–2009), a Malaysian/Indonesian Muslim extremist
- US military jargon for specific non-commissioned-officer ranks:
  - First sergeant, Army
  - Master sergeant, Marine Corps
- Jargon for roles in human-sexuality:
  - Top, or dominant, role in BDSM practices
  - One in a triad of sexual postural preferences, specifically top, bottom, and versatile
  - A slang term for the act of Fellatio

== Arts, entertainment, and media ==
- Top (character), a supervillain character from the DC Comics universe
- The Top (album), 1984, by The Cure
- "The Top" (short story), by Franz Kafka
- Top TV Network, regional television station in Papua, Indonesia
- Top (album), 2020, by Youngboy Never Broke Again
- "Top" (Stray Kids song), 2020
- "Top", a 1993 song by Live, from the album Throwing Copper
- "Top", a 2020 song by Fredo Bang
- "Top", a 2025 song by Bini
- Top (band), a British rock band
- T.O.P (born 최승현, 1987), a South Korean rapper, musician, and actor. Former member of boyband BigBang
- Top, bottom, switch – Roles in BDSM practices

== Brands and enterprises ==
- Top (rolling papers), brand for hand-rolled cigarettes
- Top Air, Indonesian airline company
- Top Oil, Irish oil company

== Computing ==
- Top (software), a standard Unix program
- .top, a generic top level domain
- Top type, in computer science type theory, the data type containing all others
- Top of stack, the first element of a Stack (abstract data type)

== Politics ==
- Opportunity Party (New Zealand), a political party in New Zealand
- Trumpet of Patriots, former name of the Australian Federation Party

== Mathematics and physics ==
- Top (category theory), a category of topological spaces or topological manifolds
- Top (algebra), in module theory, the largest semisimple quotient of a module
- Top, written ⊤ or 1, in lattice theory, the greatest element in a partially ordered set
- Top, down tack, or Tee (symbol), the symbol ⊤
- Top quark, the third-generation up-type quark

== Other uses ==
- Top (sailing ship), part of a ship's rigging
- Top (tool), used for rope manufacture

== See also ==
- Hardtop, rigid form of automobile roof
- Softtop, convertible automobile top made out of flexible materials
- TOP (disambiguation)
- Tops (disambiguation)
- Topping (disambiguation)
