= Henry Topping =

Henry Topping may refer to:

- Henry Topping (footballer, born 1908), English footballer
- Henry Topping (footballer, born 1915), English footballer

== See also ==
- Harry Topping (1913–2001), English footballer
