= Topping (surname) =

Topping is an English surname. Notable people with the surname include:

- Chris Topping (born 1951), English footballer
- Dan Topping (1912–1974), owner of the New York Yankees
- George Topping (1881–1958), Australian footballer
- Harry Topping (1913–2001), English football player and coach
- Henry Topping (footballer, born 1908) (died 1977), English footballer
- Henry Topping (footballer, born 1915) (died 2004), English footballer
- James Stirratt Topping Kennedy (1930–1973), Scottish security guard killed by armed robbers
- Jenny Topping (born 1980), American softball player
- Keith Topping (born 1963), British screenwriter
- Keith James Topping (born 1947), British researcher
- Keith Topping (American football) (1912–1972), American football player
- Michael Topping (1747–1796), Chief Marine Surveyor of Fort St. George in Chennai, India
- Norman Topping (1908–1997), American university administrator
- Patrick Topping, English DJ
- Seymour Topping (1921–2020), American journalist and writer
- Walter Topping (died 1980), Northern Irish politician

== See also ==
- Carlos Toppings (1953–2007), Costa Rican footballer
- Topping (disambiguation)
