= BSA Bantam =

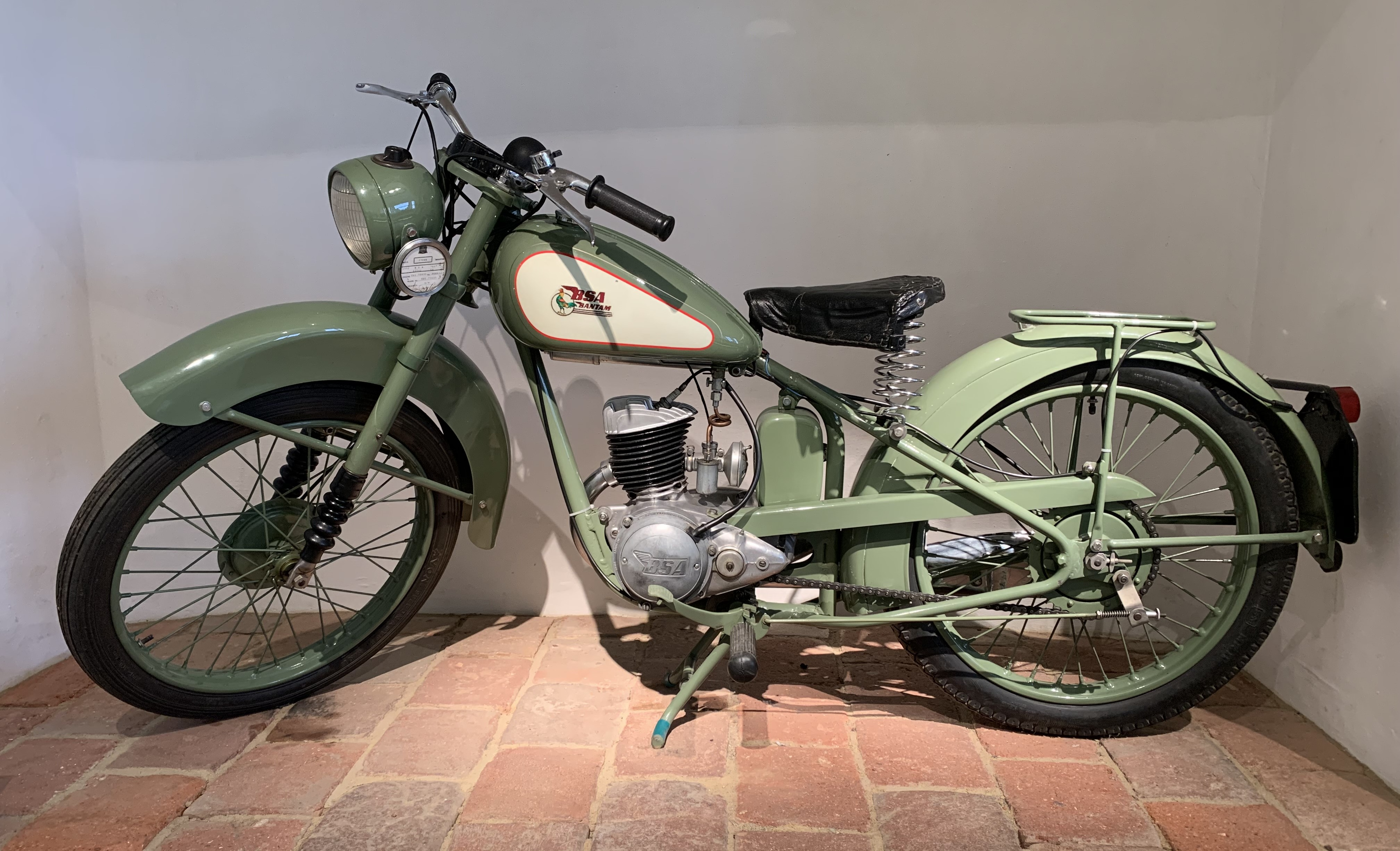
- D1 Bantam in Mist Green
- Manufacturer: BSA
- Production: 1948–1971
- Engine: single-cylinder two-stroke: 123 cc (D1); 148 cc (D3); 173 cc (D5 onwards)
- Bore / stroke: 52 mm / 57 mm / 61.5 mm × 58 mm (2.05 in / 2.24 in / 2.42 in × 2.28 in)
- Power: 4.5 bhp (3.4 kW) (D1); 5.3 bhp (4.0 kW) (D3); 7.4 bhp (5.5 kW) (D5 and D7); 10 bhp (7.5 kW) (D10); 12.6 bhp (9.4 kW) (D14/4 and D175 / B175)
- Transmission: Three speed gearbox (D1 to D10) Four speed gearbox (D10 to B175)
- Weight: 196 pounds (89 kg) (dry)
- Fuel capacity: 1.75 imp gal (8.0 L) (D1 and D3); 2 imp gal (9.1 L) (D5 and D7); 1.9 imp gal (8.6 L) (D7 Deluxe onwards)
- Fuel consumption: 100–125 mpg_{‑imp} (2.82–2.26 L/100 km; 83–104 mpg_{‑US})

The BSA Bantam is a two-stroke unit construction motorcycle that was produced by the Birmingham Small Arms Company (BSA) from 1948 (as a 123 cc) until 1971 (as a 173 cc). Exact production figures are unknown, but it was between 350,000 and 500,000.

== History ==
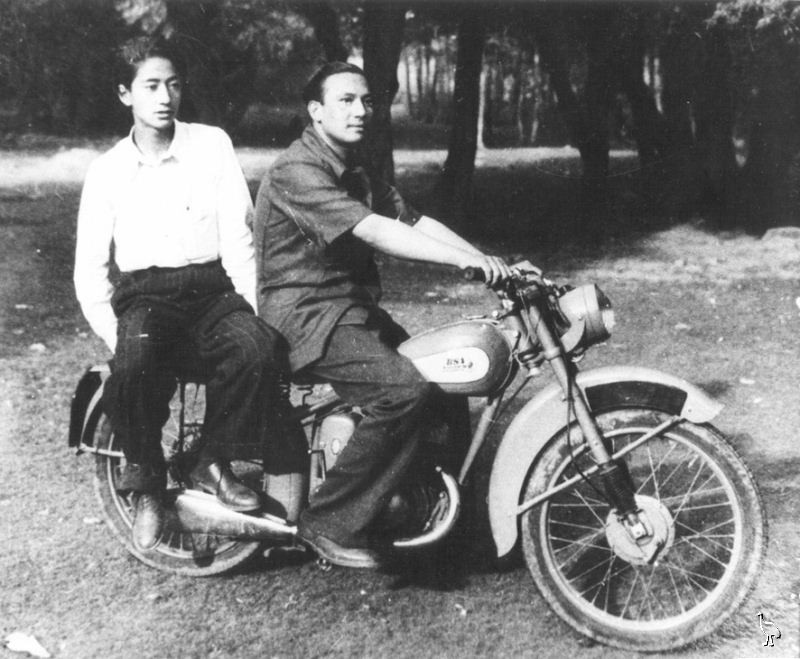
Nepalese merchants on a Bantam in Lhasa, Tibet, about 1952

The Bantam was based on a German design, the DKW RT 125, which the Allies of World War II received as war reparations. BSA launched the first model, the D1, in 1948. Motorcycles based on the RT 125 also went into production in other countries. The DKW factory was in Zschopau in the Soviet occupation zone in Germany, and was dismantled. In about 1946 the Soviet Union launched the Moskva M1A made in Moscow. Harley-Davidson launched its Model 125 late in 1947. Auto Union, DKW's parent company, was re-founded in Ingolstadt in the American occupation zone in Germany and started production in 1949 with the DKW RT 125 W. The former DKW factory in Zschopau became part of IFA, was reinstated in 1949 an begann production with its first model IFA-DKW RT 125. The factory later became MZ. In 1955 Yamaha launched its YA-1, which was its first production motorcycle.

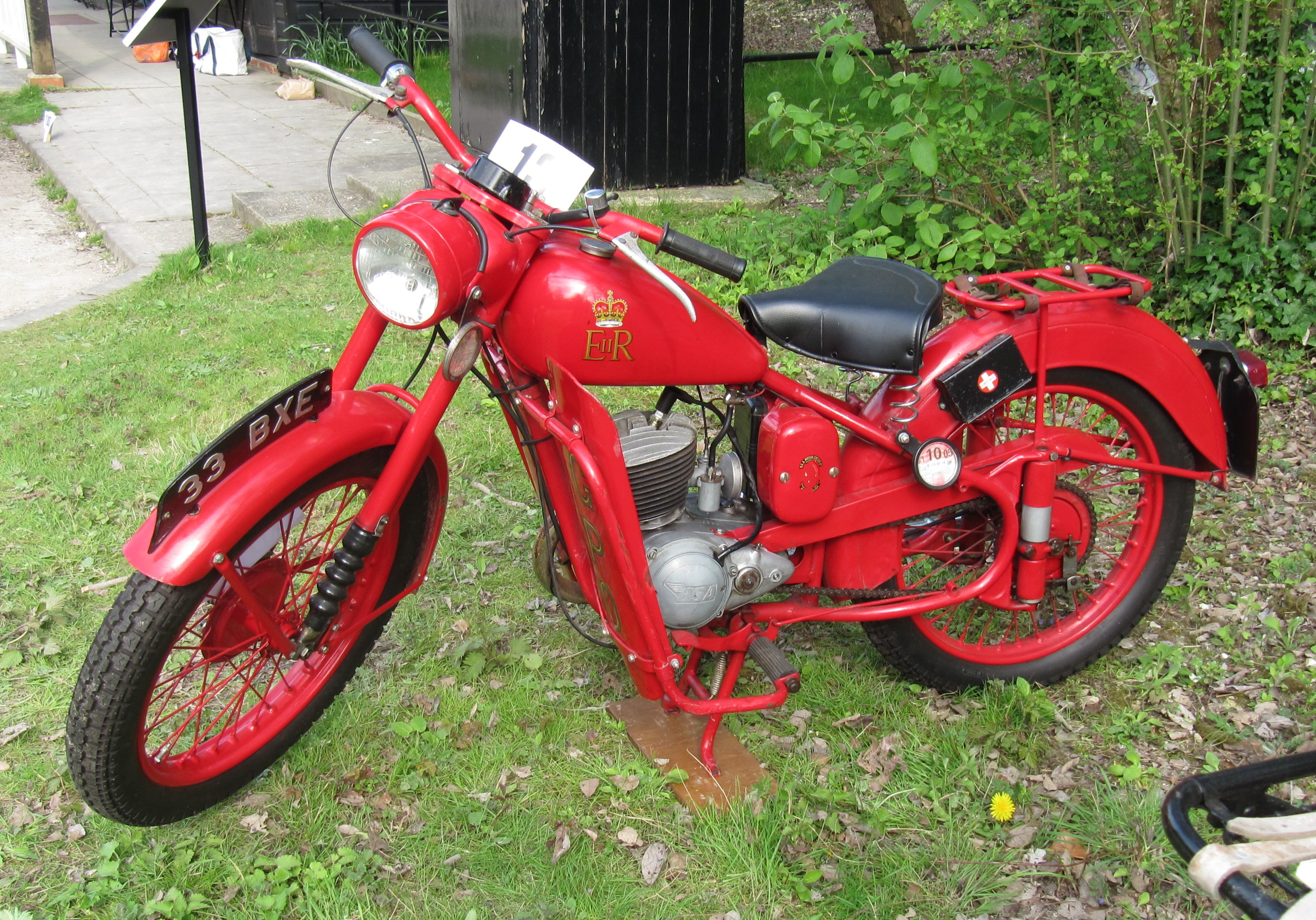
123cc D1 Bantam in GPO red livery

BSA built the Bantam in Redditch. It was designed as a mirror image of the RT 125, so that the gearchange was on the right side, in conformity with other British motorcycles of the period, and with measurements changed from metric to inches. The model Bantam, the D1, was launched in 1948 outside of the UK and in 1949 within the UK. It was in production until 1963. It had a three-speed gearbox, and a telescopic front fork with undamped springs. In its original form the D1 had no rear suspension; "direct" electrics; and a "fishtail" silencer. The front mudguard was deeply valanced, to allow for the fact that it was fitted to the "unsprung" part of the front fork, meaning that the front wheel moves up and down within the mudguard. At first the D1 was offered in only one colour, Mist Green, with an ivory panel painted on each side of the fuel tank. It was priced at £60 plus purchase tax.

In subsequent years BSA developed the Bantam with battery electrics; damped front suspension; rear suspension with plungers, and then with a swinging arm; larger engines; a steel silencer that could be dismantled for cleaning; and a four-speed gearbox. Models from 1959 onward have a swinging arm frame that bears little relation to the rigid, plunger and initial swinging-arm versions. However, the form of the original engine remained recognisable throughout the 23 years of Bantam production.

== Engine ==
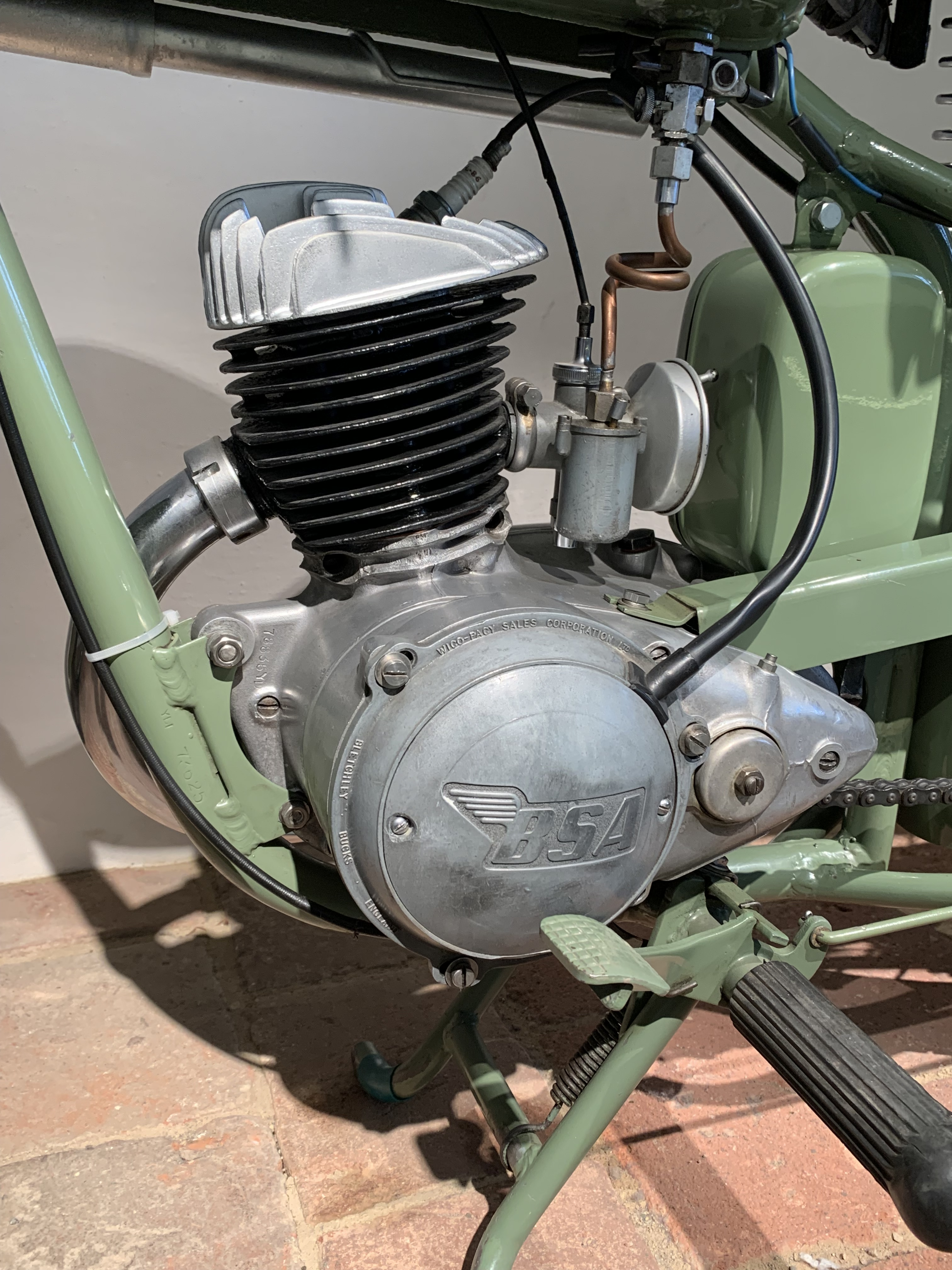
123 cc engine on a D1 Bantam

The engine is a unit-construction (engine and gearbox of one piece) single-cylinder two-stroke. The barrel is cast iron and the cylinder head is alloy. Models built from 1948 until 1968 have a three-speed gearbox. Models from 1968 to 1971 have a four-speed gearbox. All models have a "wet" clutch.

Ignition is of two types: a Lucas battery-powered coil in earlier machines, or a Wipac magneto. The magneto is on a composite assembly within the flywheel with its magnet inserts. Windings give power either directly to the lights (with a dry cell for when the engine was stopped) or via a rectifier to a lead-acid battery. Early D1s have a "fishtail" style silencer. This was hard to clean inside, which was problematic for a two-stroke. On later D1s BSA fitted a more conventional cylindrical silencer, from which the baffles can easily be removed for cleaning. High-level exhausts were made for the trials and off-road models, in which the only electrics are the magneto-powered ignition.

== Models ==
This listing shows only the main variants and most models were available with refinements or in competition form. BSA had used a lettering system for their range of motorcycles and started the "D" series for their first two-stroke. The D175 was marketed as the B175 as BSA struggled against imports in the late 60s to its closure in 1972 (the larger capacity "B" series having helped make them the largest motorcycle manufacturer in the world). The engine size shown is nominal, British motorcycles were made 1 or 3 cc smaller than their tax bracket maximum to allow for re-bores and wear.

Model name	Years produced	Engine	Top speed	No. of gears	Rear suspension	Electrics	Colour scheme
D1	1948–1963	123 cc, 4 bhp (3 kW)	45 mph (72 km/h)	3	Rigid 1948–56; Plunger 1953–63	Wipac or Lucas	Mist-green only (including wheel-rims)
Bantam de luxe/ BD1	1949–1953	123 cc, 4 bhp (3 kW)	45 mph (72 km/h)	3		Wipac or Lucas	Limited edition, Finished in black enamel, tank with chromium top strip and cream side panels; polished primary chain case; chromium rims and mudguard clips; leg shields incorporating crash bar; larger carrier.
D3	1954–1957	148 cc, 5.3 bhp (4.0 kW)	50 mph (80 km/h)	3	Plunger 1954–56; Swinging arm 1956–57	Wipac	Grey, black, or maroon
D5	1958	173 cc, 7.4 bhp (5.5 kW)	57 mph (92 km/h)	3	Swinging arm	Wipac	Entire machine maroon or black with ivory tank panels and chrome bars and wheels.
D7	1959–1966	173 cc, 7.4 bhp (5.5 kW)	57 mph (92 km/h)	3	Swinging arm	Wipac	Various shades of red or blue with chrome highlights.
D10	1967	173 cc, 10 bhp (7 kW)	57 mph (92 km/h)	3	Swinging arm	Wipac with coil ignition and 60 W alternator	Blue & silver or Polychromatic Blue and chrome
D10 Sports & Bushman	1967	173 cc, 10 bhp (7.5 kW)	57 mph (92 km/h)	4	Swinging arm	Wipac with coil ignition and 60W alternator	Sports: Flamboyant Red and chrome. Bushman: orange and white
D14/4 Supreme D14/4 Sports & Bushman	1968–1969	173 cc, 12.6 bhp (9.4 kW)	65 mph (105 km/h)	4	Swinging arm	Wipac	Black or Polychromatic Blue with two tone tank, painted above, chrome plate below. Sports: Flamboyant Red & Chrome, Bushman orange and white
D175/B175 & Bushman	1969–1971	173 cc, 12.6 bhp (9.4 kW)	65 mph (105 km/h)	4	Swinging arm	Wipac	Blue, red or black. Bushman: orange and white

Pre-1958 (D1 to D3) had 19 inch wheels and 4.5 inch brakes. The 1958 D5 had 18 inch wheels and 4.5 inch brakes. 1959 D7 and later models had 18 inch wheels and 5 inch brakes front and rear.

== Developments and models ==
=== D1 ===
The D1 (the original model) 123cc was available at first only with a rigid rear suspension. BSA introduced optional plunger rear suspension in 1950, and stopped making the rigid-framed version in 1956. All D1s have undamped front suspension, which gives a bouncy ride.

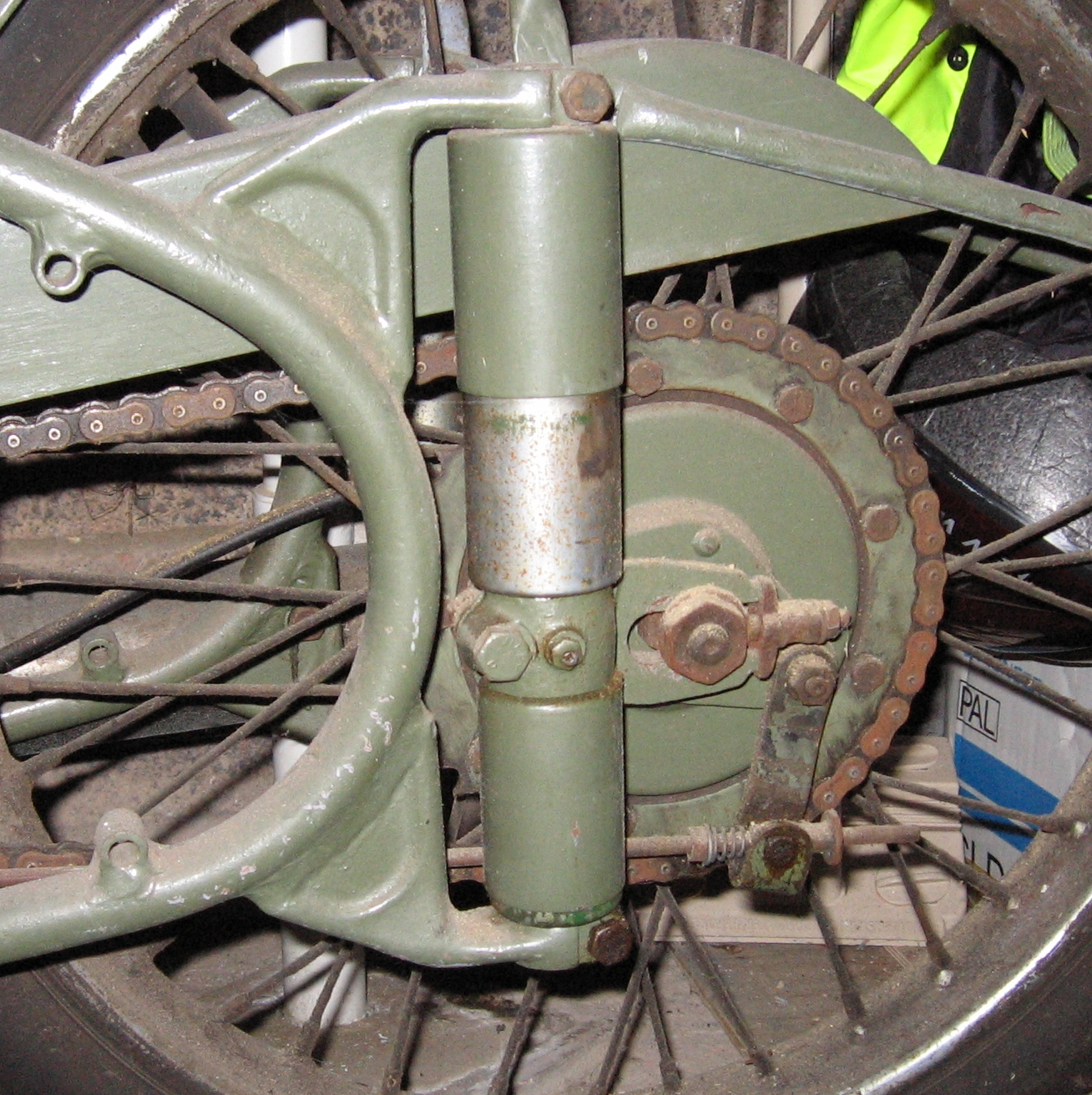
Bantam D1 plunger suspension. The telescoping covers protect the springs. Maximum travel is probably less than indicated by the amount of inner can (chrome) showing and the position of the chainguard. Note the rod-actuated rear brake.

BSA offered D1's with different electrical lighting systems. Wipac systems were available either in 6 Volt AC (known as direct lighting) or DC. The AC system used a small dry "torch" cell battery to illuminate the forward-facing "pilot" bulb within the headlamp shell. The remaining lighting was available for use only when the engine was running. The dry cell was disposable. It could not be recharged, and had to be replaced when exhausted. The DC system included a lead acid battery and operated in a conventional manner. For a short period some D1's were equipped with Lucas lighting systems, and these operated in a similar manner to the Wipac DC system.

In 1953 BSA introduced a foam-upholstered dualseat as an optional alternative to the single saddle. In the same year it built the 100,000th D1. From 1958 the D1 was offered in maroon as an alternative to mist green. The D1 continued to be offered to the public until 1963, and was still made for the General Post Office for at least two more years.

==== Deluxe / BD1 ====
This model is identical to the standard D1, except for a black tank with chromium strip on top and cream side panels; black frame and mudguards; chromium plated wheel-rims; polished primary chain cover; and crash bars; legshields; and larger luggage rack. The model was available by special order from 1949 to 1953 in the overseas market, primarily in Canada, US, Australia, but not in the UK. There was no production records for this model or where they were sent.

=== D3 Major ===
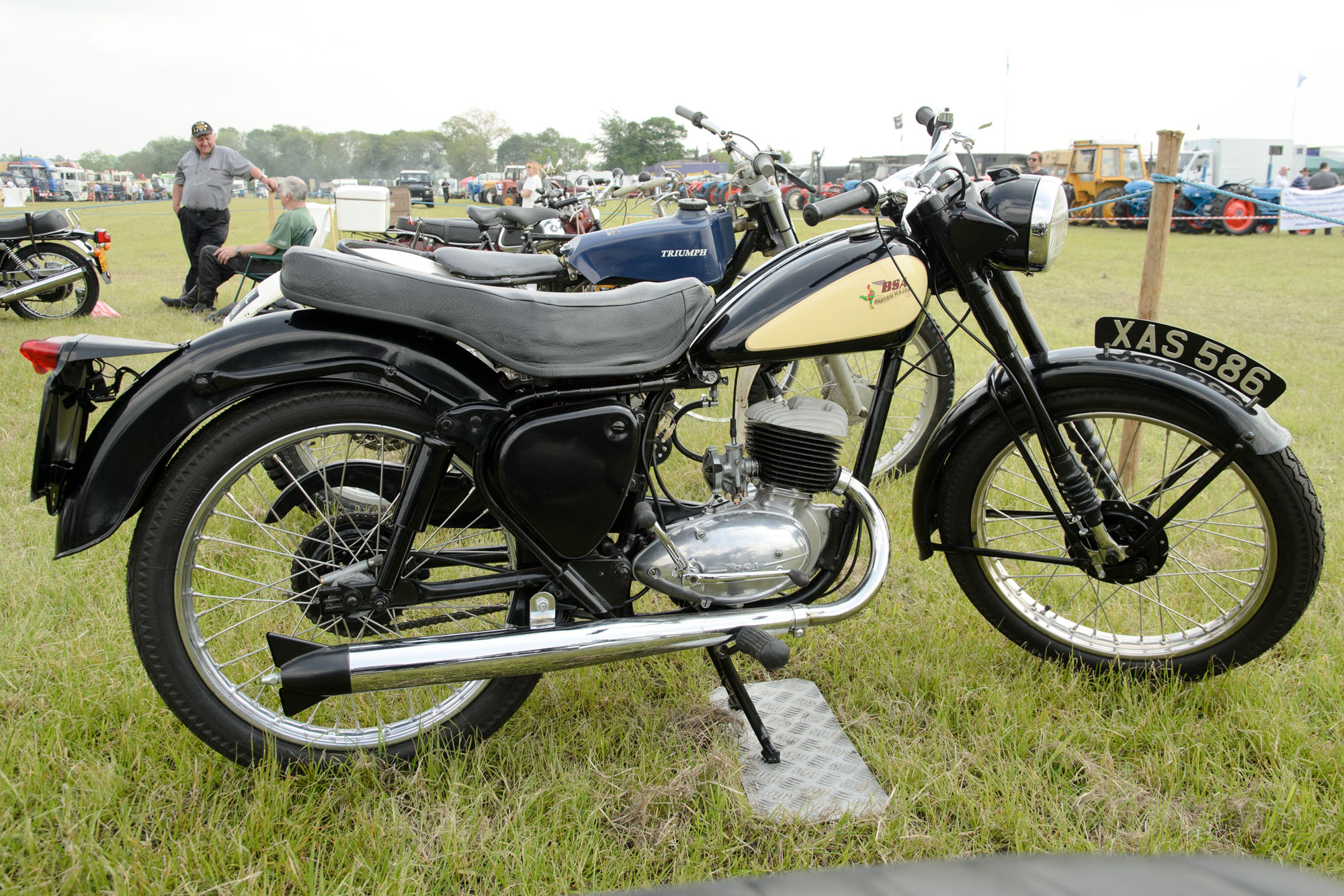
148cc D3 Bantam Major in black

BSA introduced the D3 Major in 1954. It was the first development from the original Bantam. BSA increased the engine cylinder bore from 52 mm to 58 mm, which gives the D3 a displacement of 148cc, and increased its power from 4.5 to 5.3 bhp. The air-cooling fins were also enlarged, which changed the external appearance of the engine. The D1 engine was given same increase in finning from this date. A dualseat was fitted as standard. The D3 has a shallower front mudguard, fitted to the lower part of the front fork, so that it stays close to the front wheel and moves up and down with it. D1's built from 1953 onward have the same arrangement. BSA finished all D3s in pastel grey, with ivory panels on either side of the fuel tank. In 1956 BSA changed the rear suspension from plunger to swinging arm. It stopped making the D3 in 1958.

=== D5 Super ===
The D5 Super is a development of the swinging-arm D3, with a lengthened rear section to give more upright mounts for the rear suspension. BSA increased the cylinder bore to 61.5 mm, which increased the displacement to 173 cc, and the power to 7.5 bhp. BSA fitted an Amal Monobloc carburettor. The D5 has a larger, more rounded fuel tank, which increased capacity to two Imperial gallons. BSA finished all D5s in maroon, with an ivory side panel on either side of the fuel tank. It made the D5 for 1958 only.

=== D7 Super ===
BSA introduced the D7 Super was introduced for 1959. It has a 173cc engine, similar to the D5, but with the addition of an alloy outer cover on the left side of the crankcase, concealing the Wipac "geni-mag", to match the streamlined shape of the right side. The D7 has a swinging-arm frame, but it was a new design that departed from that of the D3 and D5. BSA gave the D7 a new hydraulically damped front fork, with fork legs that are a shortened version of the front fork of the Triumph Tiger Cub. The headlamp is mounted in a nacelle, which was fashionable at the time, but prevents the angle of the headlamp from being adjusted. Originally BSA offered two colour options: "royal red", or black. In both cases, an ivory side panel was originally painted on the fuel tank.

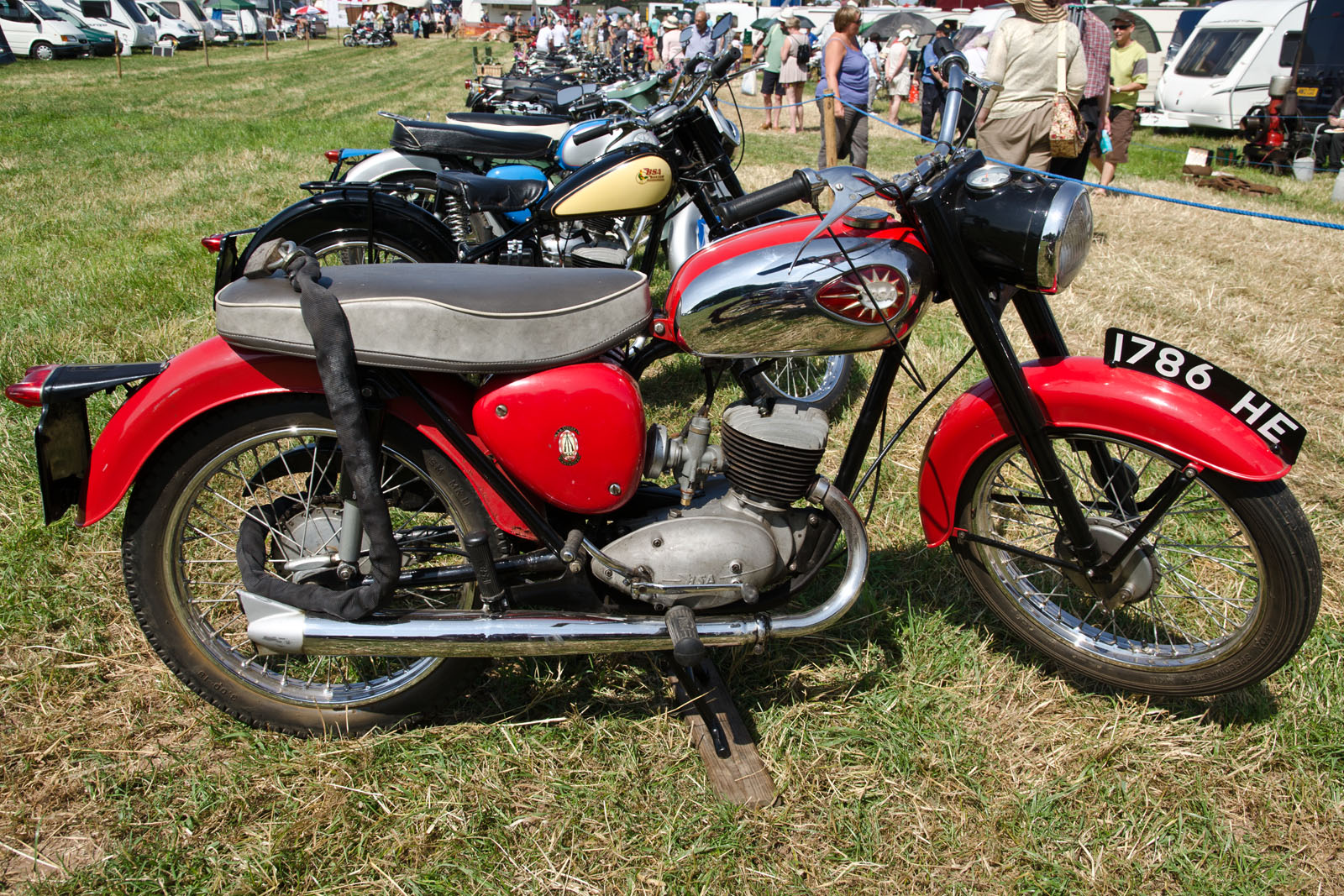
173cc D7 Bantam Super in Royal Red, with chrome-plated tank and peardrop badges, as offered from 1961 to 1964.

For 1961 BSA restyled the fuel tank, with a chrome-plated panel and pear-shaped plastic BSA badge on each side. This matched four-stroke models in the BSA range at the time. In the same year BSA introduced "sapphire blue" as a colour option, alongside black or royal red. In 1965 BSA revised the tank again, with an indentation on each side for the rider's knees, and a round plastic BSA badge instead of pear-shaped. BSA painted the revised D7 in a colour that it called "flamboyant red". In the same year it introduced coil ignition for the De Luxe model. In 1966 BSA introduced an economy version called the "Silver Bantam", which was in sapphire blue, and had silver paint on the sides of its fuel tank instead of chrome. This was short-lived, as BSA stopped making the D7 that year.

=== D10 ===
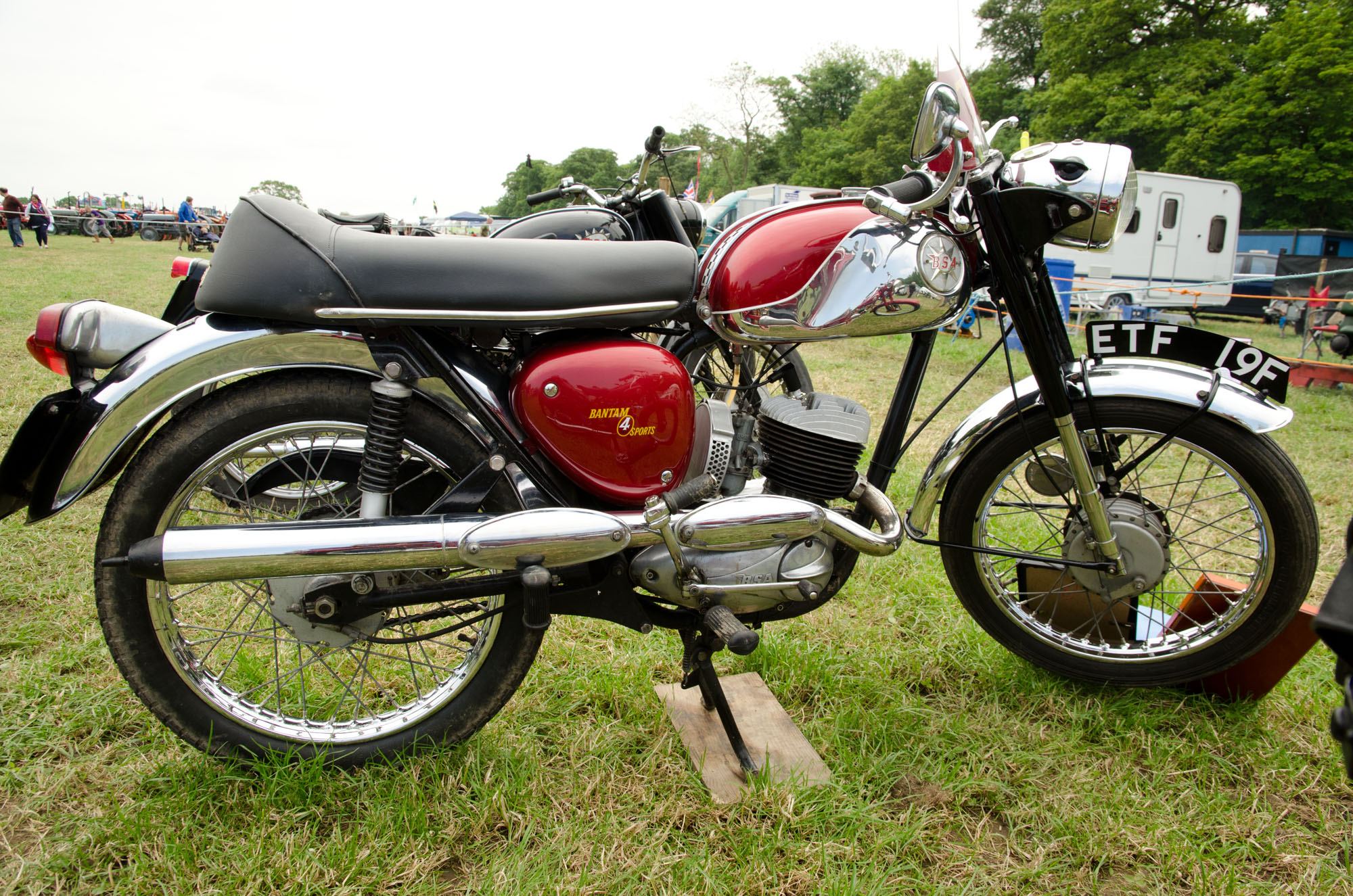
D10 Sports in Polychromatic Red

In 1967 BSA introduced the D10. Its engine was still 173cc, but BSA increased its compression ratio to 8.65 to 1, which increased its power to 10 bhp. The D10 was the first model to have an Amal Concentric carburettor. BSA revised the electrical system, with a new type of Wipac alternator. The points were moved from the left side to a separate housing in the primary drive cover on the right side. Apart from this, the D10 looked very similar to the last version of the D7.

BSA offered four versions of the D10: the Sports, Supreme, Silver, and Bushman. The Sports and Bushman were the first Bantams to have a four-speed gearbox. BSA gave both models a separately-mounted headlamp, without a nacelle. It gave the Sports chrome mudguards; a fly-screen; and a hump on the rear of the dualseat. The Bushman is the off-road version, with a plate under the engine to protect the crankcase; high-level exhaust; 19-inch wheels; 58-tooth rear sprocket; increased ground clearance; and a unique colour scheme of orange and white. The Supreme and Silver have a headlamp nacelle and three-speed gearbox like the D7. The Silver has less chrome, making it the economy option. BSA made the D10 models for 1967 only.

=== D14/4 ===
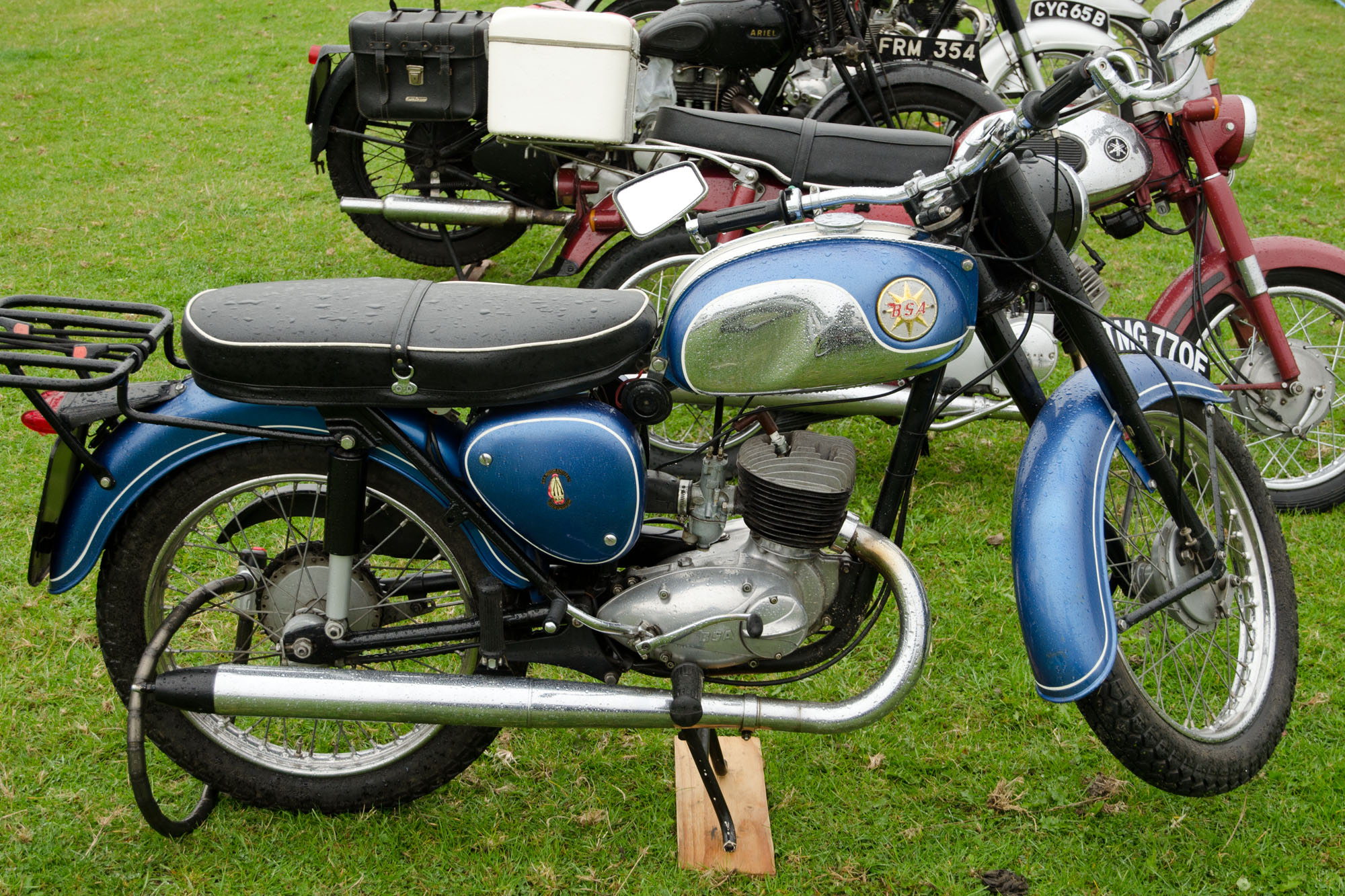
D14/4 in Polychromatic Blue

In 1968 BSA introduced the D14/4. It increased the compression ratio to 10 to 1, which increased power to 12.6 bhp. The "/4" in the model name signifies the fact that all models had four-speed transmission, as BSA had at last discontinued the three-speed gearbox. BSA discontinued the Silver Bantam, and offered only three models: Supreme, Sports, and Bushman. BSA gave the Sports and Bushman models a heavier front fork, based on that of the BSA C12. The engine flywheel had compression plates that were held on by rivets, which in some cases failed. On some D14/4s, the small end bearing on the connecting rod failed. Both faults led to warranty claims.

=== D175 / B175 ===
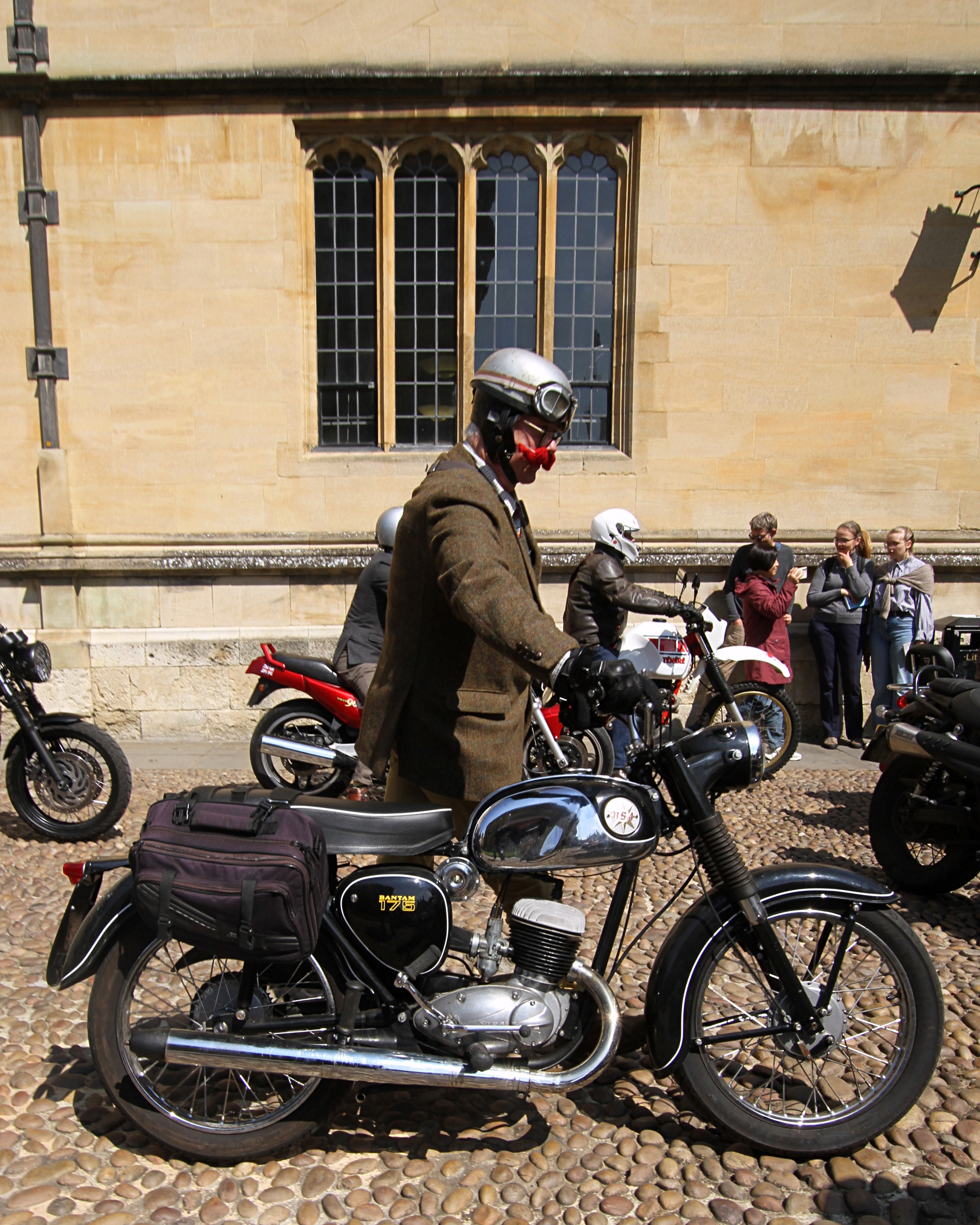
D175 in black

In 1969 BSA introduced the D175, which it later redesignated the B175. This was the final Bantam model series. It is arguably the best for power and handling. BSA revised the engine, with different finning on the cylinder barrel, and a revised cylinder head with a central, vertical spark plug and efficient squish combustion chamber. The compression ratio was slightly reduced, to 9.5 to 1. This makes the engine smoother and more reliable than the D14/4, but just as powerful. BSA revised the fixing on crankshaft compression disc plates to cure the problem with the D14/4. BSA also changed the front fork, using that of the Triumph T20SH Sports Cub instead of the BSA C12. The D175 has exposed suspension springs both front and rear. The kickstart has a stronger shaft and folding pedal. The headlight main-beam indicator light was discontinued.

This final model was produced from 1969 to 1971, finished in metallic red and blue or plain black, all with white painted linings on the fuel tank, mudguards and side panels like the D14/4. It has an outline text decal in yellow reading "Bantam 175" on the side panels. The right hand side panel covers an efficient large air filter that feeds the Amal 626 Concentric carburettor via a rubber hose. After the demise of BSA, remaining stocks of B175s were sold until at least 1973.

=== Bushman ===
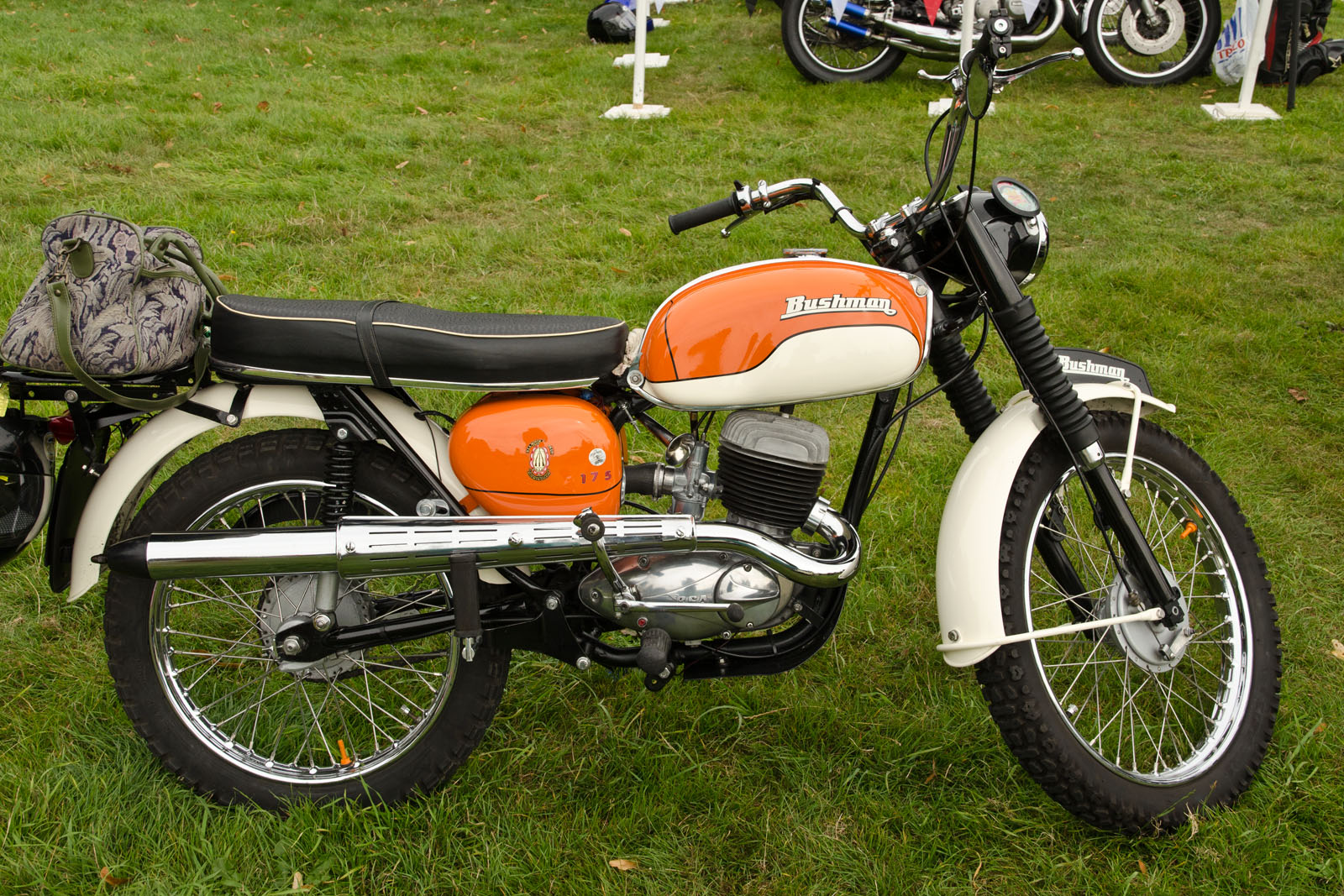
1970 D175 Bushman in orange and white

The off-road Bushman version was available as an export model, for Africa and Australia in particular, but 300 were sold in the UK. All UK Bushman models have the engine number prefix BB. The precursor to the Bushman was a stripped down D7 called a Bronc Buck. Bushman models proper were equipped with lights, high-level exhaust, side stand, and dualseat. There was a Pastoral model for commercial farming that had single saddle and carrier rack instead of a dualseat. The first Bushmans were derived from the D7, but they were made in far greater numbers as D10s, some D14/4s and ultimately the D175 / B175 Bushman. Various air filters were fitted to the Bushman models but all were mounted remotely from the carburettor behind the side panels where the battery was on road Bantams, Bushman models had direct lighting so dispensed with the battery. Most featured sump guard plates and the engine mounts are raised slightly to give the engine cases better clearance from rocks etc. Even by the mid-1970s the Bushman models were sought after by collectors and they are even more so today an amazing 49 years after BSA produced the last ones in 1971.

== D18 ==
BSA engineers were working on an upgrade to the Bantam, the D18, before financial troubles in 1971 led to a drastic reduction of the BSA model range. The D18 was intended to be an interim model before the introduction of a new range of two-strokes that were in development. The D18 had an alloy barrel and a new head with a central spark plug. A prototype was built before the project was cancelled.

== Bantam 350 ==
In October 2026, the current holders of the BSA marque, the BSA Company (which is owned by the Indian Mahindra Group), announced a new model, the BSA Bantam 350. This is a 4-stroke, 6-speed, single-cylinder, liquid-cooled, DOHC machine that produces 29 bhp @ 7750rpm. Weighing 185 kg, it has single disc brakes (front & rear), a tubular frame, and conventional front telescopic forks and twin rear-shock suspension. The 334cc engine is a Jawa unit, and the Bantam 350 shares many components with the Jawa 42 FJ. This bike has become a "best seller' in its category in Britain.

== See also ==
- List of BSA motorcycles
- List of motorcycles of the 1940s
- List of motorcycles of the 1950s

== Bibliography ==
- Henshaw, Peter (2008). The BSA Bantam Bible: All Models 1948 to 1971. Veloce Publishing Ltd. ISBN 978-1845841591.
- Holmes, Tim; Smith, Rebekka (1986). Collecting, Restoring and Riding Classic Motorcycles. Enderby, Leicester: PRC. ISBN 978-0850597820.
- Jones, Brad (2014). BSA Motorcycles, The Final Evolution. Veloce Publishing Ltd. ISBN 978-1845846473.
- Wilson, Steve (1990). Practical British Lightweight Two-Stroke Motorcycles. Sparkford: Haynes Publishing. ISBN 0-85429-709-X.
