= Tops =

Tops, TOPS or Topps may refer to:

== Arts and entertainment ==
- Tops (band), a band from Montreal, Quebec
- "Tops", a Rolling Stones song on their album Tattoo You
- Tops (later known as TV Tops), a 1981-84 comic by British publisher DC Thomson

== Companies ==
- Tops Friendly Markets, an American supermarket chain
- Tops Records, an American record label
- Tops Supermarket, a Thai supermarket chain
- Topps, a manufacturer of candy and collectibles
- Topps Meat Company, a producer of ground beef patties
- Topps Tiles, a British retailer that sells floor tiles and related products
- TOPS Club (Take Off Pounds Sensibly), a non-profit weight-management organization in the United States

== Medicine ==
- TOPS system, a spinal implant used as an alternative to fusion after lumbar decompression surgery

== Science and technology ==
- TOPS, (Total Operations Processing System), a railway stock management system
- TOPS (file server), a file-sharing system for the Macintosh and IBM PC
- TOPS (Nortel) (Traffic Operator Position System), a computer-based operator switchboard
- Thermoelectric Outer Planets Spacecraft, a proposed vehicle to carry out the Planetary Grand Tour
- TOPS, INT8 teraoperations per second in Neural processing units and other AI accelerators

== Other uses ==
- Jan Tops (born 1961), Dutch equestrian
- Talented Offerings for Programs in the Sciences (TOPS Program), a program at Marc Garneau Collegiate Institute, Toronto, Canada
- Traffic operations practitioner specialist, a non-professional certification for transportation engineers
- Taylor Opportunity Program for Students, a scholarship program in Louisiana, US
- Team Oriented Problem Solving, one of Ford's Eight disciplines problem solving
- Target Olympic Podium Scheme, an Indian sports initiative

== See also ==
- TOPS-10, a Digital Equipment Corporation PDP-10 operating system
- TOPS-20, a Digital Equipment Corporation PDP-10 operating system
- TeraOPS (trillions of operations per second); see High Performance Storage System
- Top (disambiguation)
- Topper (disambiguation)
- Topping (disambiguation)
