= Harley-Davidson Hummer =

Harley-Davidson Model 125
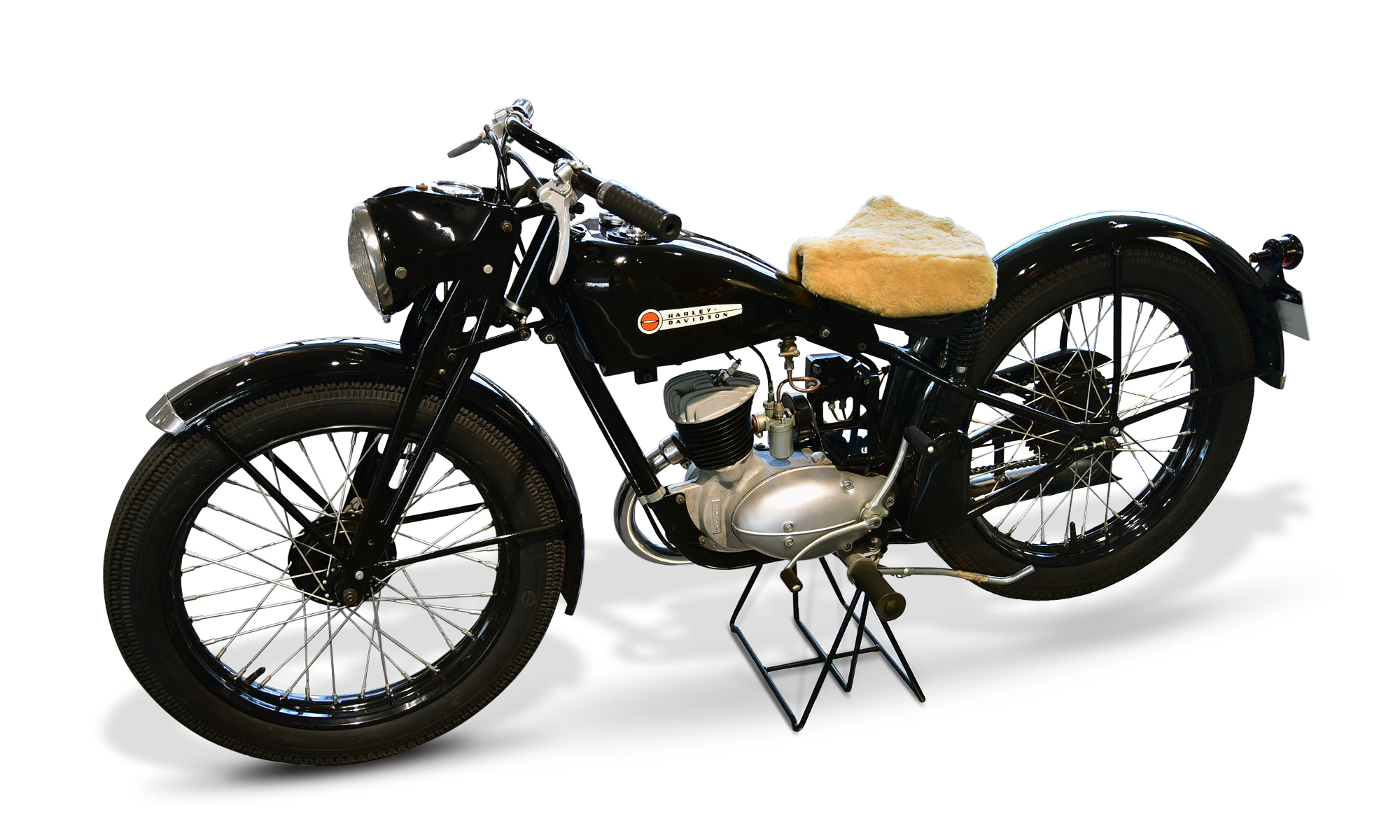
- Harley Davidson 125
- Manufacturer: Harley-Davidson Motor Company
- Also called: "Hummer" (current usage), "American Lightweight"
- Parent company: Harley-Davidson Inc.
- Production: 31,793
- Assembly: Milwaukee, Wisconsin, USA
- Successor: Model 165
- Class: economy
- Engine: single-cylinder two stroke 125 cc
- Bore / stroke: 2.06 in × 2.28 in (52 mm × 58 mm)
- Compression ratio: 6.6:1
- Top speed: 50 mph (80 km/h)
- Power: 3 hp (2.2 kW)
- Transmission: 3-speed foot shift
- Suspension: Front: girder with rubber springs Rear: rigid
- Brakes: Front and rear drums
- Tires: 3.25" x 19"
- Wheelbase: 50 in (1,300 mm)
- Weight: 170 lb (dry)
- Fuel capacity: 1.75 US gal (6.6 L), including 1 US qt (0.95 L) reserve
- Related: Model 165; Hummer; Super 10; Topper; Ranger; Pacer; Scat; Bobcat

The Hummer was a motorcycle model manufactured by Harley-Davidson from 1955 to 1959. However, the name "Hummer" is now incorrectly used generically to refer to all American-made single-cylinder two-stroke Harley-Davidson motorcycles manufactured from 1948 to 1966. These motorcycles were based on the DKW RT 125, the drawings for which were taken from Germany as war reparations after World War II. The RT 125 drawings were also given to the United Kingdom and the Soviet Union as war reparations, resulting in the BSA Bantam and the MMZ M-1A Moskva, later known as the Minsk.

== Model S-125 (1948–1952) ==
The Model 125 or S-125 was introduced by Harley-Davidson in 1947 as a 1948 model. The 125 cc two-stroke engine produced three horsepower, which was sent through a three-speed foot-shift transmission. The front suspension used girder forks suspended by large rubber bands, which proved to be problematic because they broke and were unavailable from H.D. after the early 1960s.

A two-man seat was an available option, but proved to be unpopular likely because the machine was underpowered for two.

Like most vehicles at the time, the 1949 model was six volt and had a bulb and reflector headlight assembly.

Ten thousand Model S-125s were sold during the first seven months of 1947. Despite largely being ignored by dealers, the 125 gained a large following among young riders, many of whom would go on to ride larger motorcycles.

The rubber-band front suspension was replaced in 1951 by a telescopic fork referred to as "Tele-Glide".

== Model 165 (1953–1959) ==
The Model 165 replaced the S-125 in 1953. The engine was increased in size to 165 cc.

== Hummer (1955–1959) ==
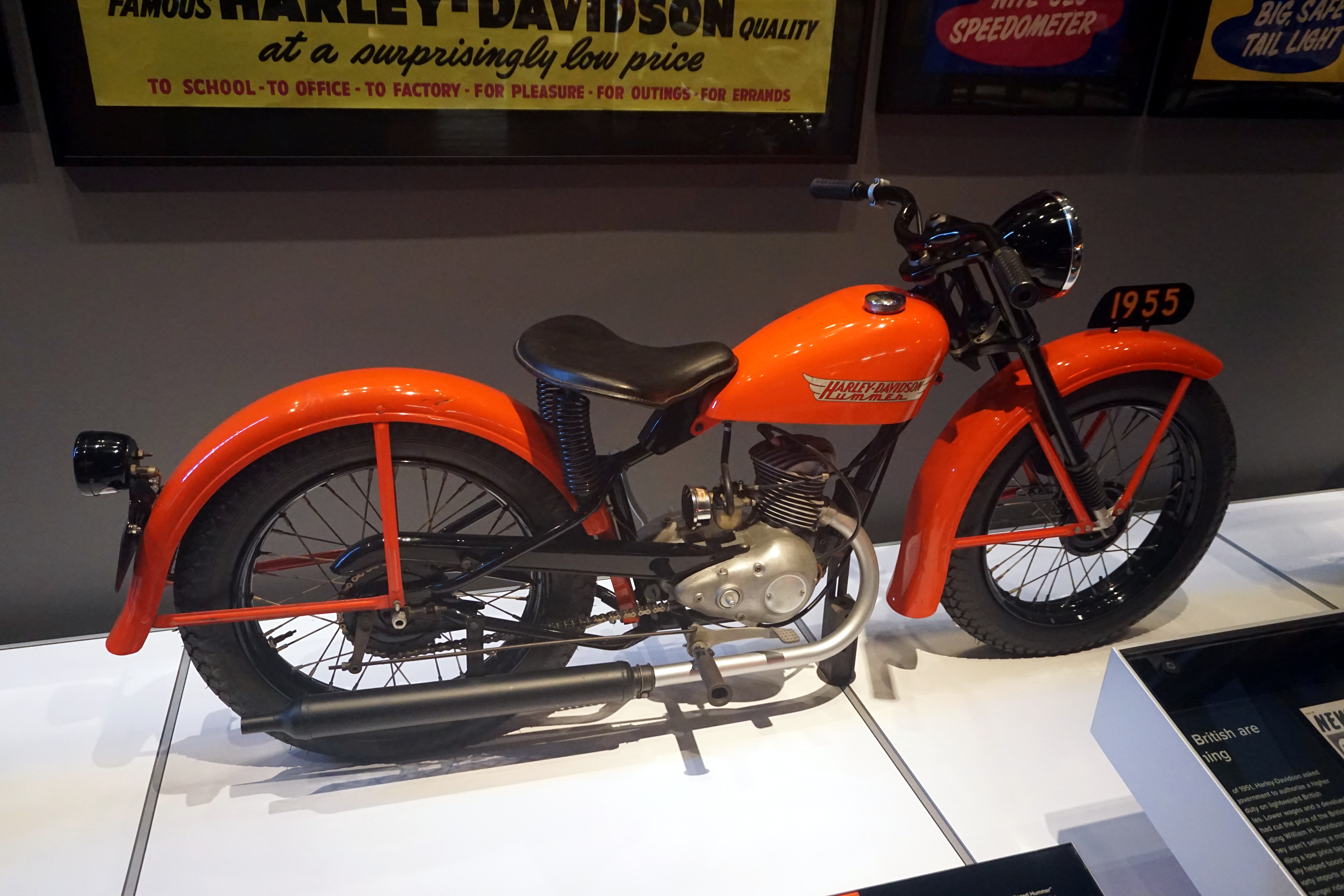
A 1955 Model B "Hummer" at the Harley-Davidson Museum

The Hummer was added to Harley-Davidson's model line in 1955. It was a stripped-down basic model using a redesigned "B-model" engine with the old 125 cc capacity. It was named after Dean Hummer, a Harley dealer in Omaha, Nebraska who led national Harley two-stroke sales.

The Hummer was as basic as it could have been. It had magneto ignition and was sold without battery, electric horn, turn signals, or brake light.

== Super 10 (1960–1961) ==
The Model 165 and the Hummer were both replaced by the Super 10 in 1960. The Super 10 used a 165 cc version of the "B-model" engine previously used in 125 cc form in the Hummer.

== Ranger (1962) ==
The Ranger was an off-road Harley-Davidson motorcycle without lights, made only in 1962. It had an extra-low final-drive ratio of 7.0:1 (12-tooth countershaft gear and 84-tooth rear sprocket) with neither lighting system nor front fender. It is believed to have been built to consume their supply of 165 cc engines, which would not be needed for their other models.

== Pacer (1962–1965) ==
The Pacer was the replacement for the Super-10. It used the newly enlarged 175 cc B-model engine.

In 1963, one year into production, the frame of the Pacer was heavily redesigned. The new frame incorporated rear suspension through an L-shaped swingarm that actuated a spring mounted horizontally under the engine. The seat and rear fender were supported on a subframe bolted to the main frame.

== Scat (1962–1965) ==
The Scat was a dual-purpose motorcycle based on the Pacer. It had a high-mounted front fender, high handlebars, softer springs supporting the seat, a "scrambler"-style high-mounted exhaust pipe, and street-legal off-road tires. The extra-low final-drive ratio of the Ranger was available on the Scat as an option. The Scat also received the Pacer's new frame in 1963.

== Bobcat (1966) ==
The Bobcat was the last of the RT 125-based Harleys and the only one offered in 1966, its only year in production. Based on the '63-'65 Pacer frame, it had ABS resin bodywork moulded in one piece that covered the tank and the rear tire and supported the seat. It was the only RT 125-based Harley with a standard dual seat.

== See also ==
- Harley-Davidson Topper - a scooter using a development of the "B-model" engine
- List of Harley-Davidson motorcycles
- List of motorcycles of the 1950s
