= DKW RT 125 =

German motorcycle

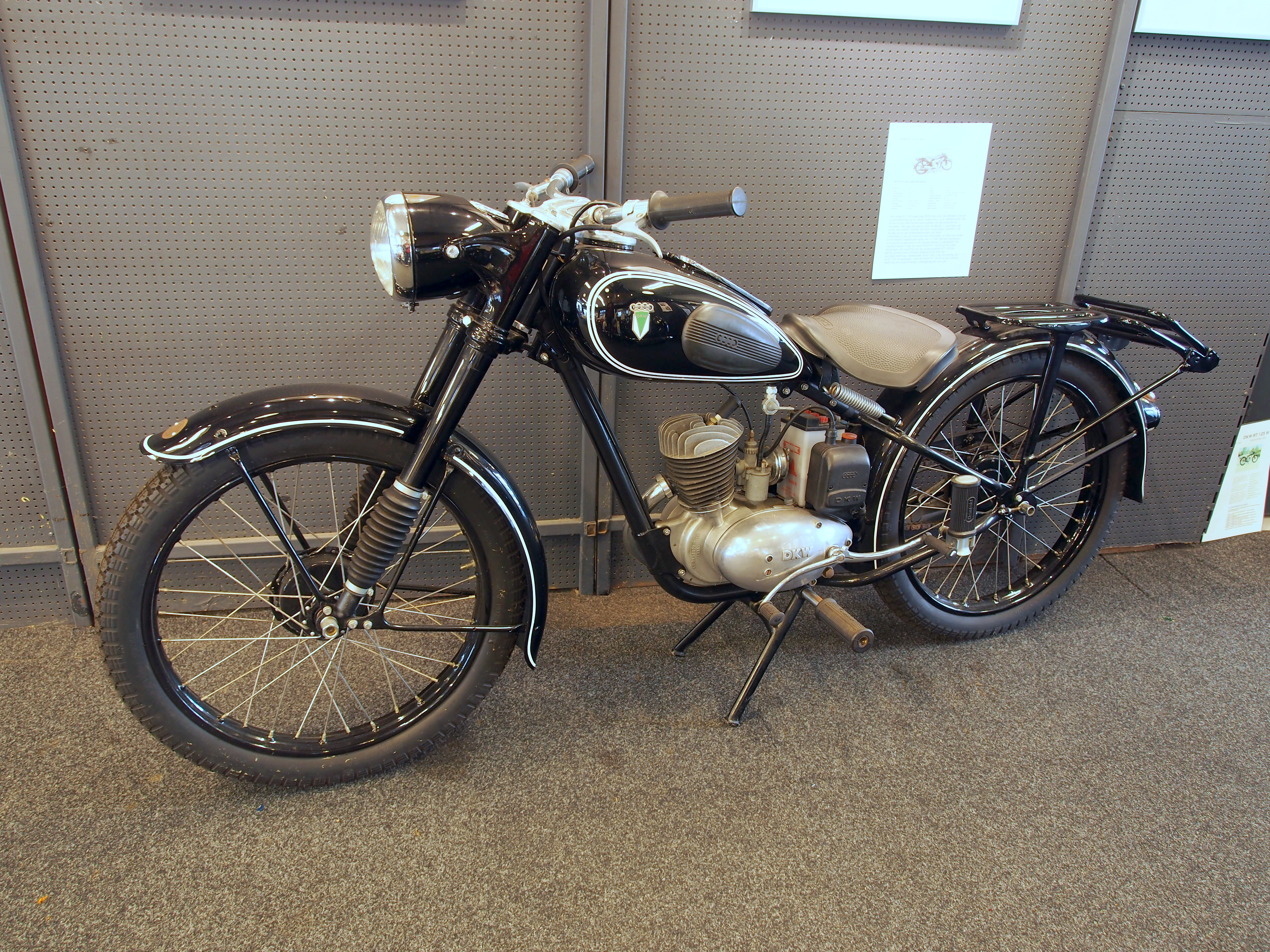
The DKW RT 125 of 1952

The RT 125 was a German two-stroke motorcycle made by DKW in Zschopau in the 1930s, IFA and MZ in the 1950s and early 1960s, and DKW in Ingolstadt in the 1950s and 1960s. "RT" stands for German: Reichstyp, English: Realm Type.

In the 1930s DKW pioneered the Schnürle two-stroke loop scavenging process to dispense with the use of a deflector piston and improve efficiency of the combustion chamber. DKW also developed a highly efficient arrangement of transfer ports. These two features were included in the RT 125 to great commercial advantage. Competitor companies such as Adler and TWN copied the adoption of flat-topped pistons and strove to develop equally efficient transfer port arrangements without infringing DKW's patent.

== Copies and variants ==
Copies of the RT 125 were built by at least eight different entities in at least six countries.

=== War reparations ===
After World War II the Soviet Union took plans, tooling and even several dozen personnel as war reparations to MMZ in Moscow (later transferred to MMVZ and SMZ) and to a factory in Kovrov, and produced copies of the RT 125 as the M1A Moskva and K-125 respectively. WFM of Poland made a modified version of the RT 125 (under SHL 125 and Sokół 125 brands), developed into 125/175 cc family motorcycles, produced until 1985.

RT 125 plans were also taken to the United Kingdom where they became the basis of the BSA Bantam, and to the USA where they formed the basis of the Harley-Davidson "Hummer" (Hummer is really just a few specific years, but generally people call the Harley lightweights Hummers).

RT 125-based motorcycles from war reparations
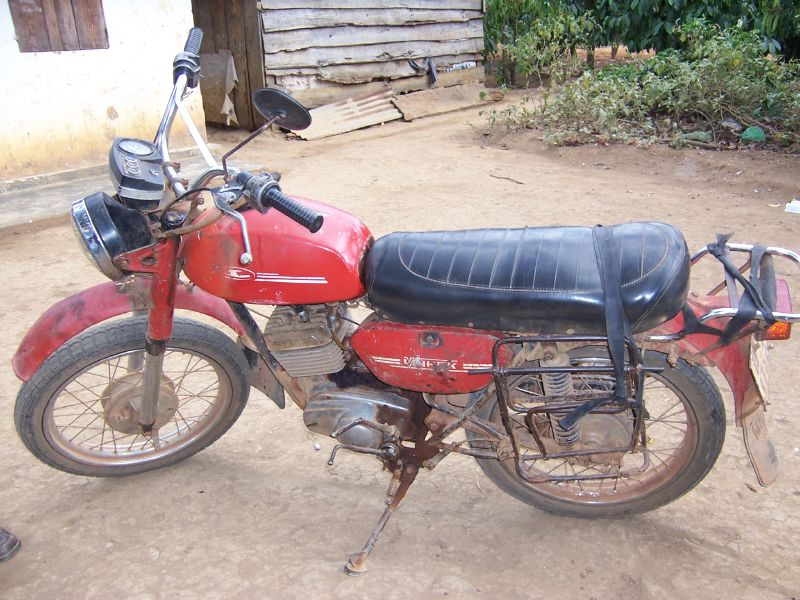
Minsk motorcycle, a development of a Soviet-built RT 125 copy

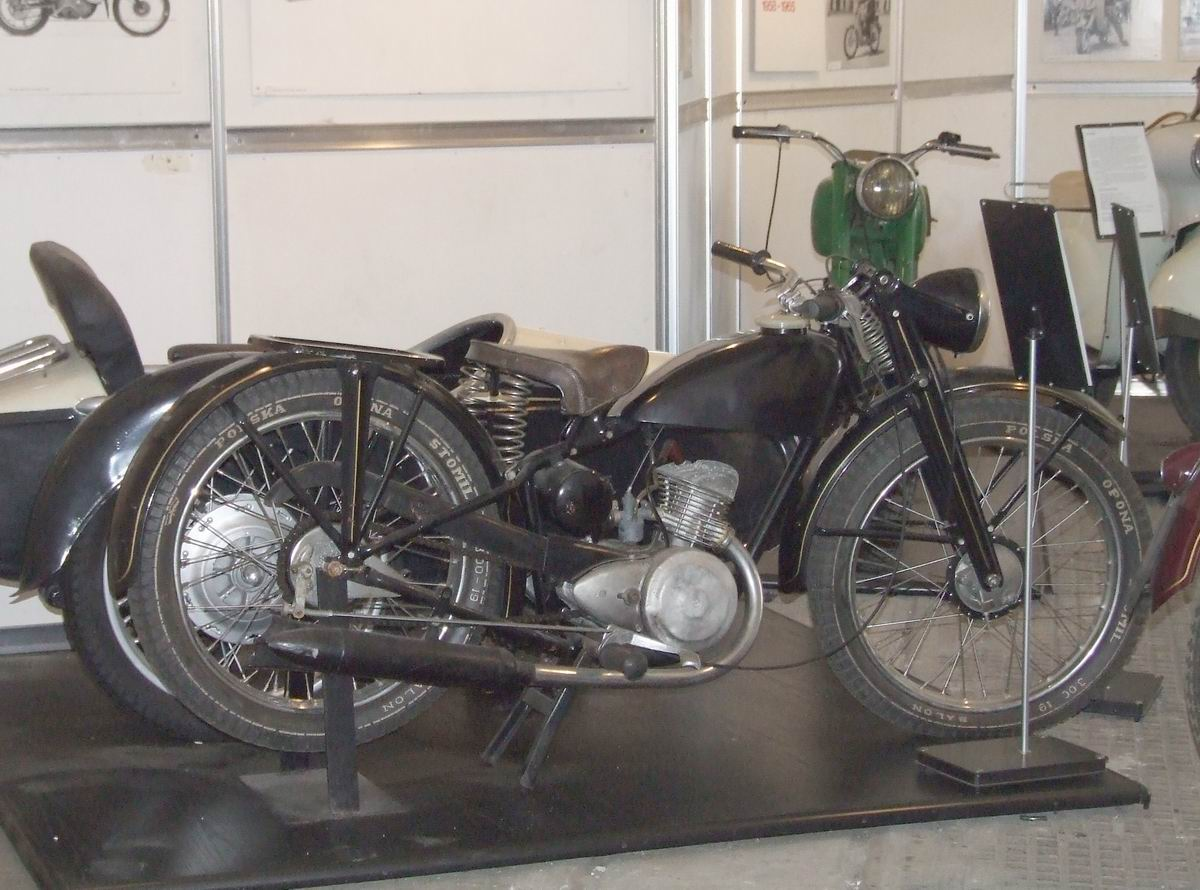
Sokół 125 motorcycle, made in Poland between 1947 and 1950

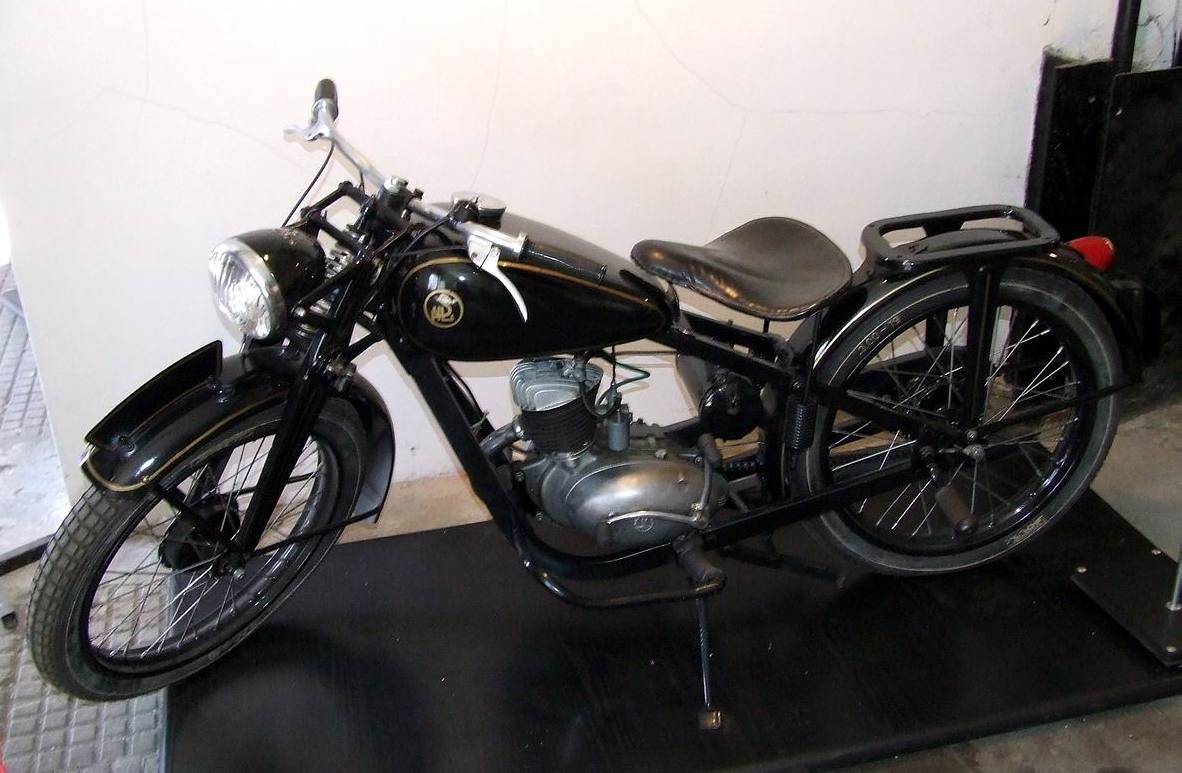
SHL M04 motorcycle, made in Poland between 1948 and 1952

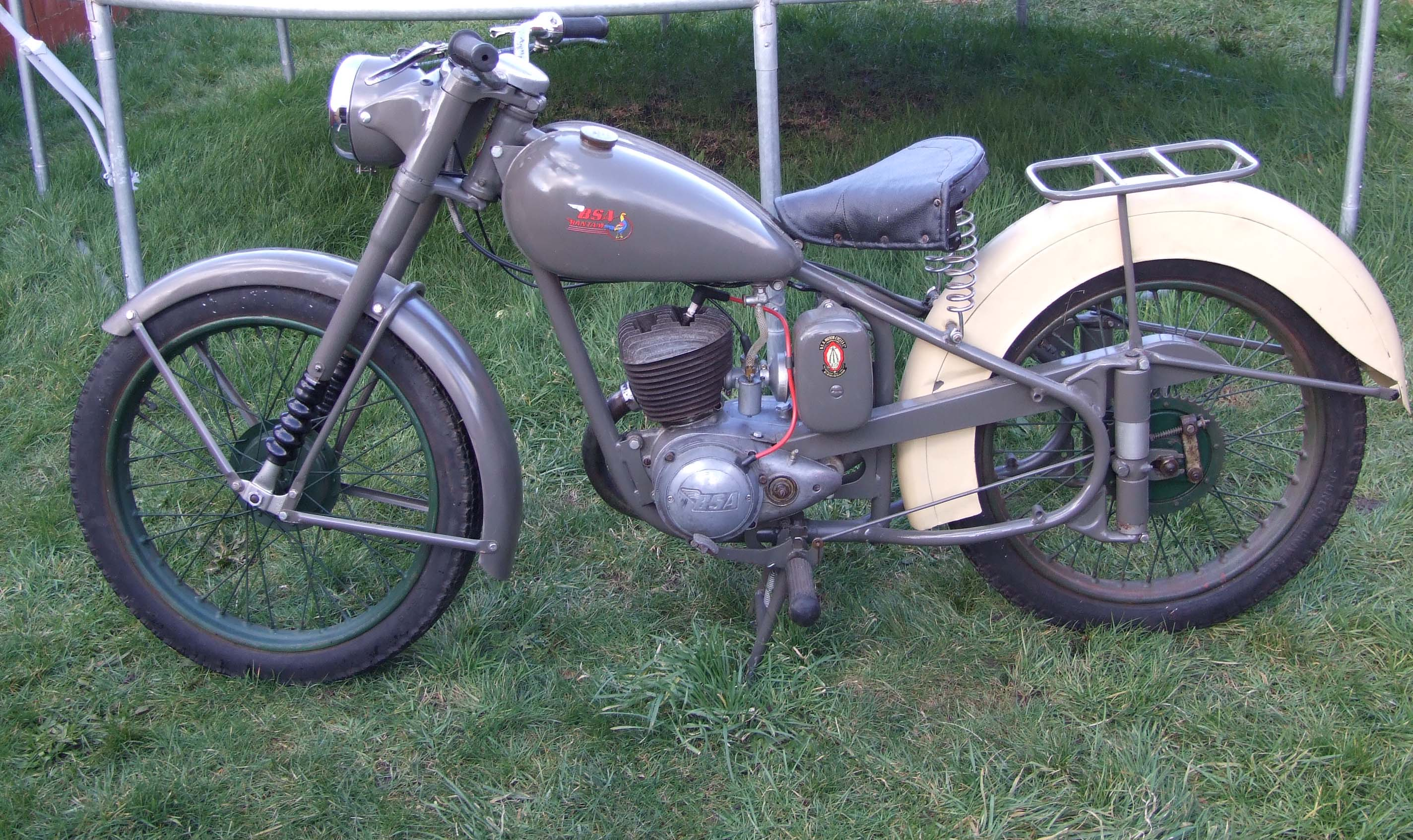
1955 BSA Bantam D3 Major

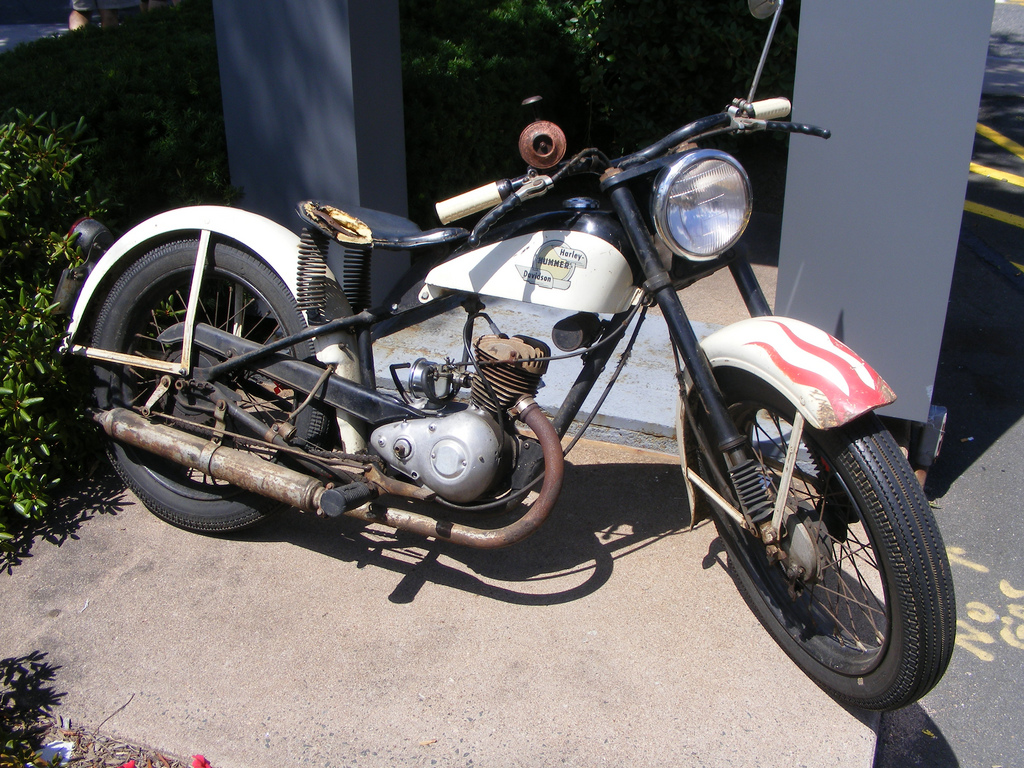
Harley-Davidson Hummer. Harley-Davidson made RT 125 derivatives from 1948 to 1966

=== Postwar German production: DKW and MZ ===
After the Second World War, DKW's factories in Zschopau were in the Soviet occupation zone. As such, they were under the control of the Soviet Union until they were handed over to the government of East Germany. The factory continued production of the RT 125 under the MZ (Motorradwerk Zschopau) brand into the 1950s.

Meanwhile, DKW had reorganized itself in Ingolstadt, where it began production of the RT 125 W (for "West") in 1949. Variants of the RT 125 W, usually with larger Engine displacements, were in production throughout the 1950s.

Postwar German RT 125s
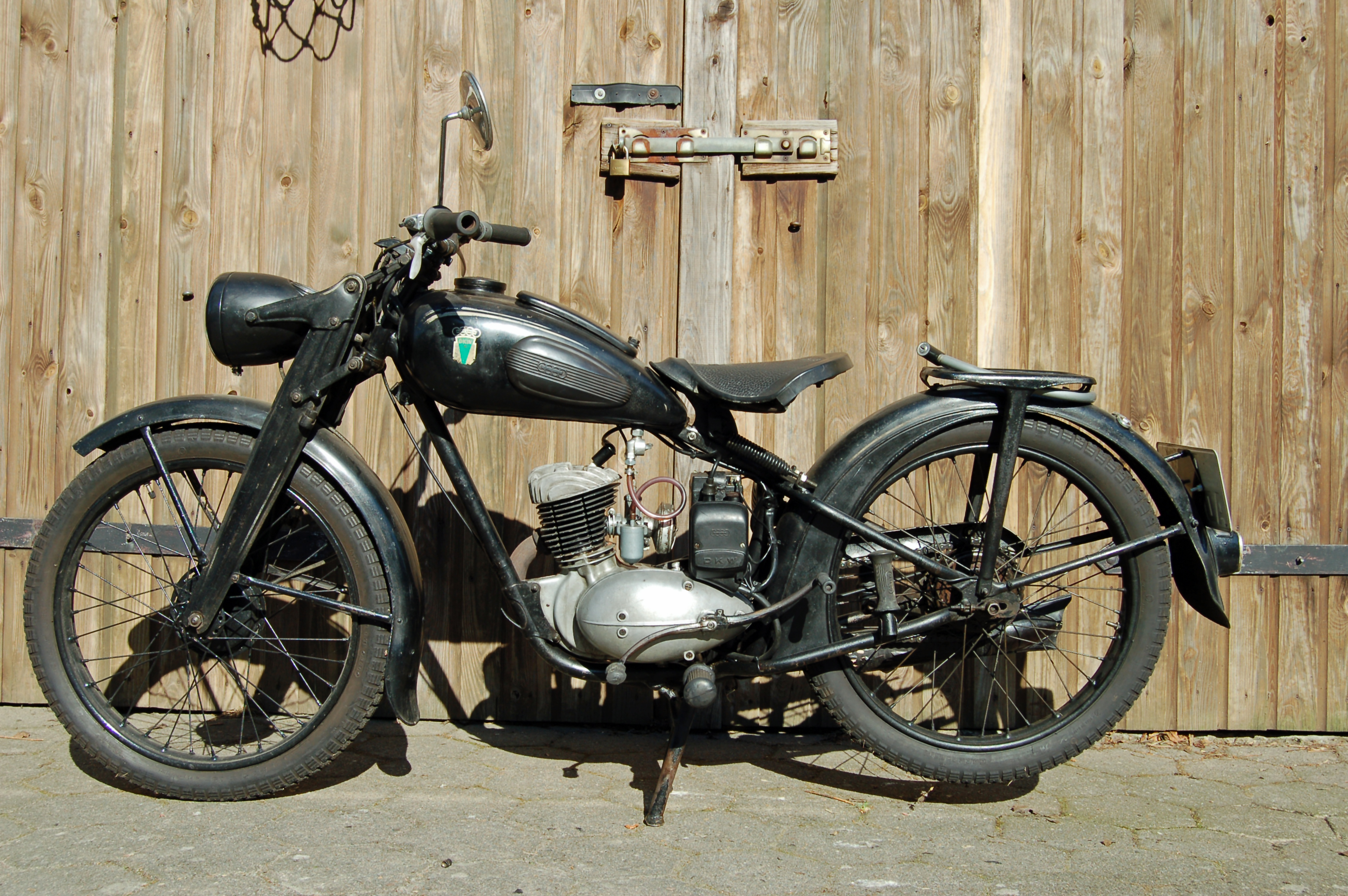
DKW RT 125 W, a West German postwar version of the RT 125

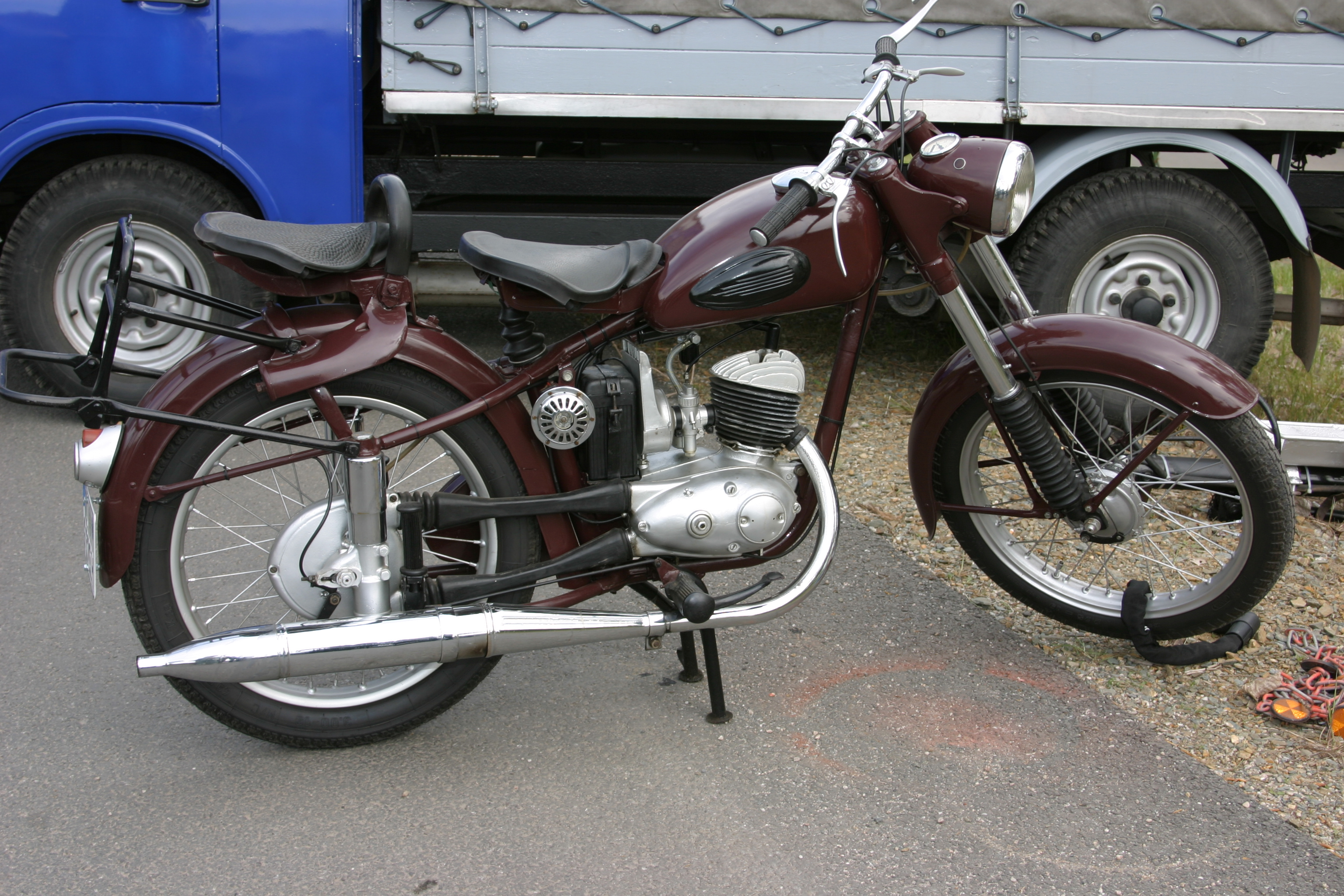
IFA/DKW 125 RT built in Zschopau, East Germany (1954-1956)

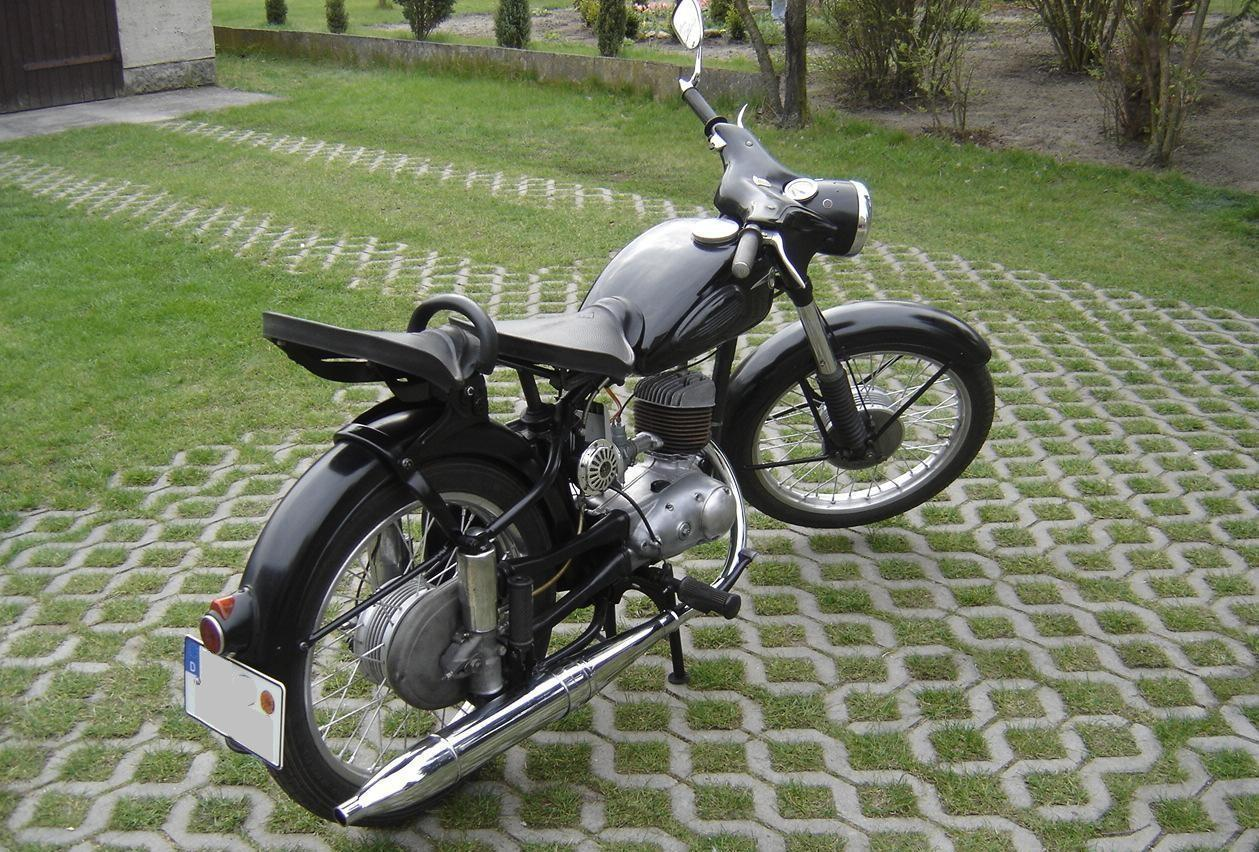
1961 MZ 125/3 built in Zschopau, East Germany

=== Yamaha YA-1 ===
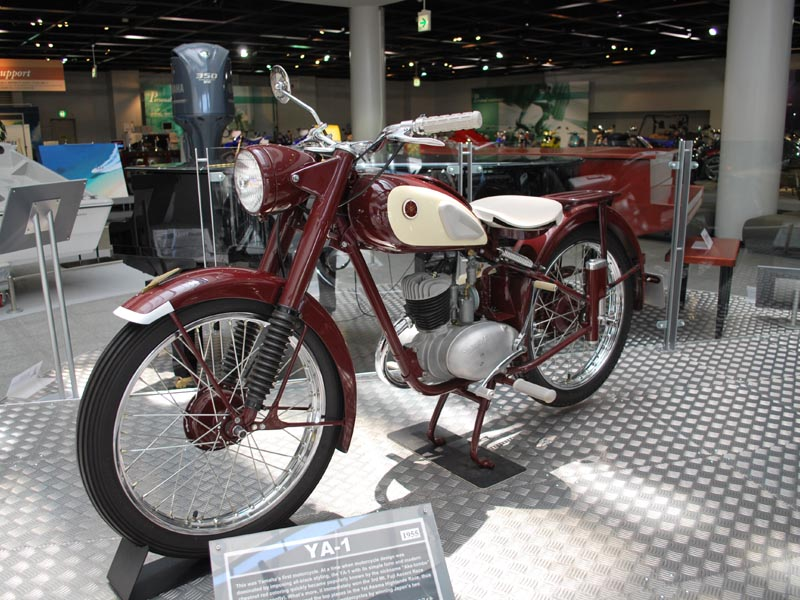
Yamaha YA-1

In the 1950s, after reestablishing themselves as manufacturers of musical instruments, Nippon Gakki decided to use the manufacturing equipment left over from wartime production to make motorcycles. Since the copyright on the RT 125 had been voided by the Allies, the company reverse engineered it as the basis for their first motorcycle. Nippon Gakki formed the Yamaha Motor Company in 1955 to build their copy of the RT 125 as the Yamaha YA-1, which was in production from 1955 to 1958. The YA-1 inherited design characteristics of RT 125 and, due to its thin body and chestnut brown tank, was affectionately nicknamed the Aka-tombo (赤トンボ, "Red Dragonfly").
