= Topper =

Topper or Toppers may refer to:

== Brand names ==
- Harley-Davidson Topper, a motor scooter manufactured from 1960 to 1965
- Topper Corp., an American toy manufacturer during 1960s and early 1970s
- Topper (sports), a sportswear brand in Argentina and Brazil founded in 1975
- Topper (dinghy), a sailing dinghy patented in 1977 by British designer Ian Proctor
- Topper's Pizza (Canadian restaurant), a chain founded in 1982 as Mr. Topper's Pizza
- Toppers Pizza (American restaurant), a company-owned and franchise chain founded in 1991

== Comics ==
- Topper (comic strip), a general term for a small comic strip published above or below another strip
- The Topper (comics), a 1953–1990 British comics periodical
- Topper, a minor character in the 1989 American comic strip Dilbert

== Film and TV ==
- Topper (film), a 1937 American film based on Thorne Smith's 1926 novel
- Topper (TV series), a 1953 American TV series based on the novel and film
- Topper, a horse ridden by American western character Hopalong Cassidy in 1939–1954 films
- Topper Harley, the lead character in the 1991 American film Hot Shots!
- Topper Thornton, the main character in the Netflix series Outer Banks
- De Toppers, a Dutch musical supergroup formed in 2005, popular on TV and DVD

== Literature ==
- Topper, a minor character in Dickens' 1843 novella A Christmas Carol
- Topper, a 1926 novel by American author Thorne Smith

== People ==
- Topper (nickname)
- Topper (surname)

== Places in the United States ==
- Toppertown, Missouri, an unincorporated community also known as Topper
- Toppers, Oklahoma, an unincorporated community
- Topper Site, an archaeological site in South Carolina

== Other uses ==
- The athletics teams of Blue Mountain College, Blue Mountain, Mississippi, United States
- Furikake, a food on top of cooked rice
- Another name for a top hat
- Another name for a pencil sharpener in Ireland
- Camper shell camper shell
