= Triumph Tiger Cub =

British motorcycle

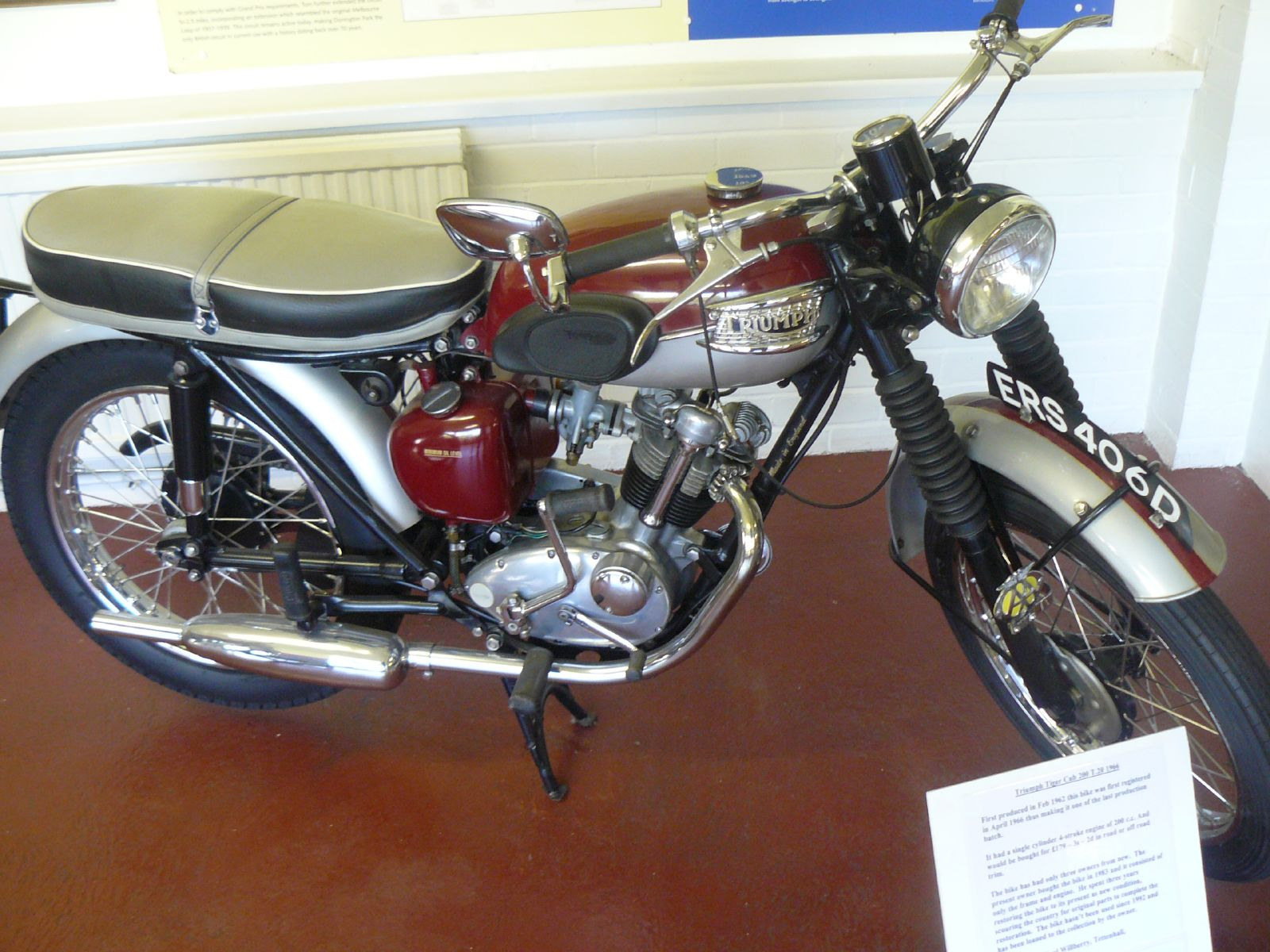
- Manufacturer: Triumph Engineering Co Ltd
- Parent company: Birmingham Small Arms Company
- Production: 1954-1956; 1957-1968
- Predecessor: Triumph T15 Terrier
- Engine: 199 cc (12.1 cu in) single cylinder OHV, four-stroke, alloy head, Amal Monobloc carburettor, earliest Amal 332 1954-57 or Zenith 17MXZ/CS5 1958-61
- Bore / stroke: T20 63x64mm, T15 57x58.5mm
- Compression ratio: T20 Sports 9:1, T20 and T15 7:1
- Top speed: T20S 74 mph (119 km/h), T20 66 mph (106 km/h) (as tested, averaged)
- Power: T20S 14.5 bhp (10.8 kW) (claimed) @ 6500rpm T20 10 bhp (7.5 kW) (claimed) @ 6000rpm T15 8 bhp (6.0 kW)
- Transmission: 4-speed sequential manual gearbox / chain-drive
- Brakes: 112mm (5.5 inches) front, 112mm (5.5 inches) rear
- Tires: 3.00x19 1954/55, 3.00x16 1956/65, 3.00x18 from 1966
- Wheelbase: 49 in (1,200 mm)
- Fuel capacity: 3 Imperial gallons
- Oil capacity: oil tank 2.5 pints, gearbox 1/3 pint (200 cc), chaincase 1/2 pint (300 cc)

The Triumph Tiger Cub was a 200 cc (12 cu in) single-cylinder British motorcycle made by Triumph Motorcycles at their Meriden factory in the West Midlands. Based on the Triumph T15 Terrier 150 cc, itself a surprise announcement just before the 1952 show, the 200 cc T20 Tiger Cub was designed by Edward Turner, and launched at the Earls Court show in November 1953. It competed well against the other small-capacity motorcycles of the time, such as those using two-stroke engines from Villiers.

== Development ==
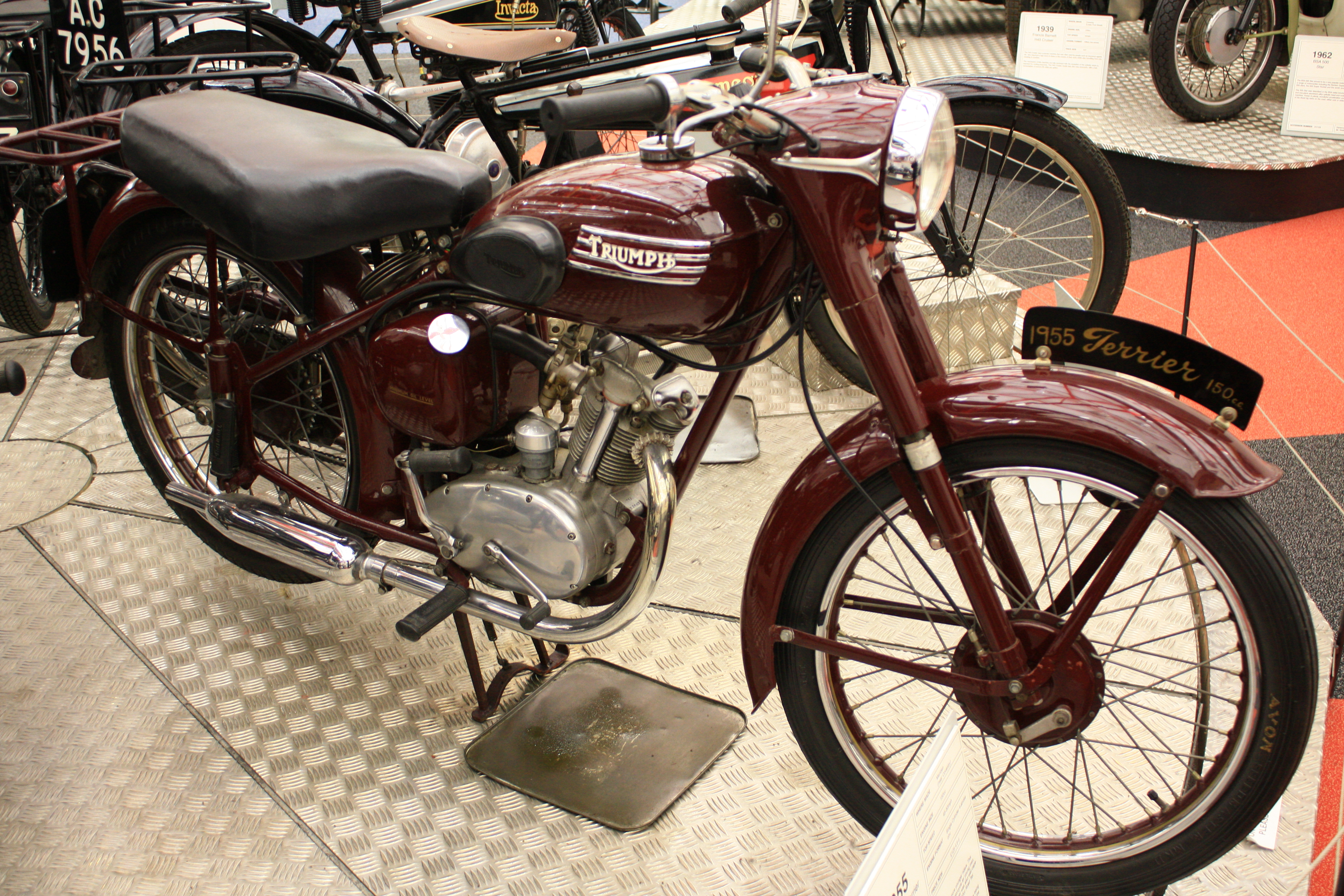
Triumph Terrier T15 150 cc with plunger rear suspension and contact breaker points behind cylinder

The first T20 Tiger Cub (1954–1956) was derived from the 150 cc Triumph T15 Terrier (1953–1956) with the same frame and forks.

The earlier version of the Cub used the Terrier's plunger rear suspension frame, but from 1957 this was updated to a more modern pattern of rear swinging-arm with twin suspension units. The ignition points were positioned in a 'distributor'-type device on the crankcase behind the cylinder. A later development in 1963 was to site the points at a more conventional location on the end of the camshaft, accessed via a chrome cover below the base of the cylinder.

The Sports Cub designated T20SH featured slimline mudguards, no rear panelling or headlamp nacelle and with a higher compression ratio and other engine modifications were timed at 74 mph mean maximum by Motor Cycle magazine.

Off-road versions produced with high level exhaust, altered suspension and studded tyres, were designated TS20 Scrambles Cub and TR20 Trials Cub.

The last model made was the T20 Super Cub, which, for economy of production cost, used a basic frame and other parts common to the BSA Bantam D10 including larger diameter wheels with full-width hubs. Launched in November 1966, it was discontinued in 1968, being briefly replaced by the 250cc TR25W 'Trophy', based on BSA's B25 Starfire.

=== Military ===
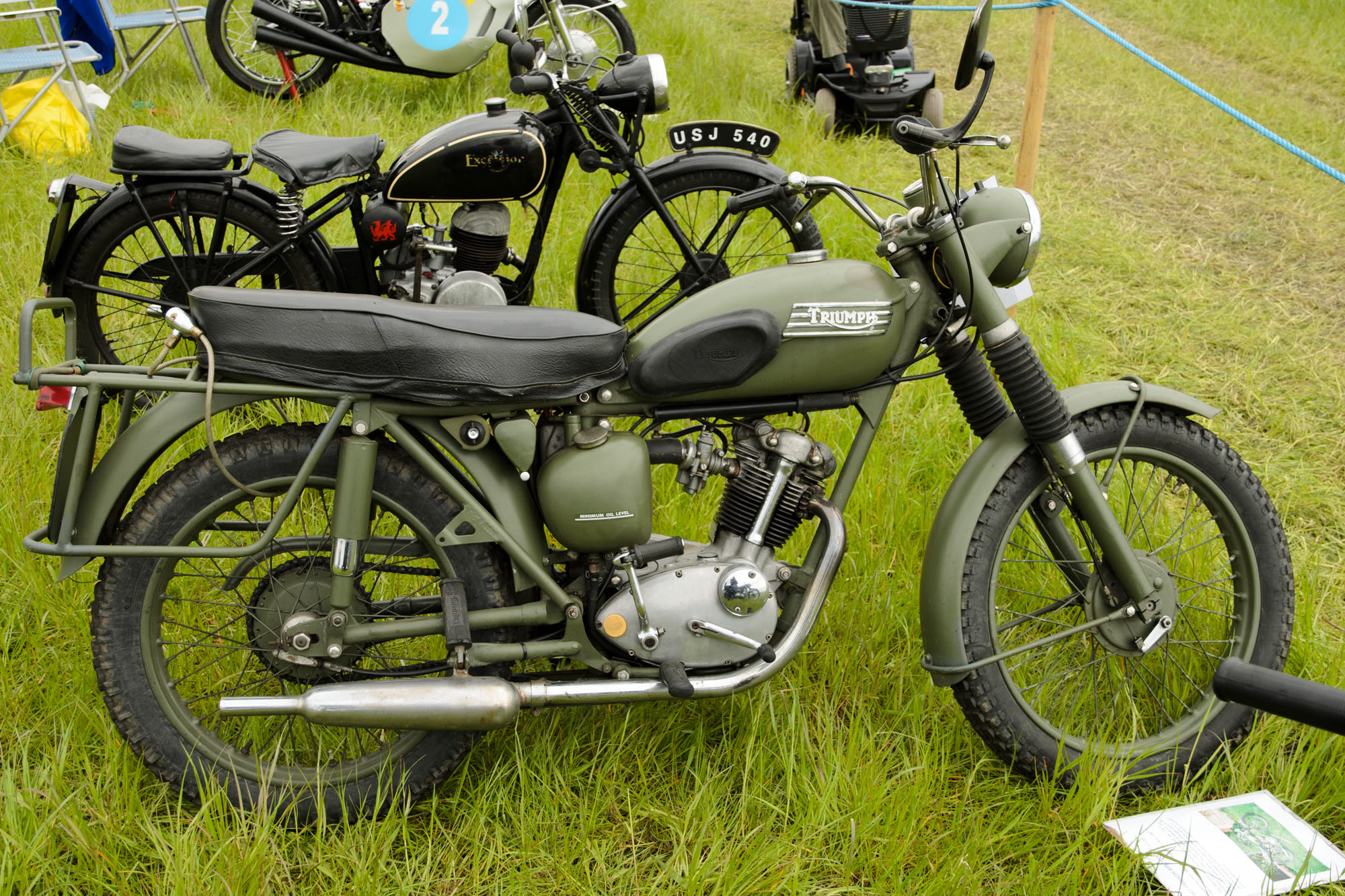
Triumph T20WD at a show. It is missing its pannier bags.

A small number of T20WD Tiger Cubs were supplied to the French Army. These bikes were configured for a pillion passenger and were painted green. They had an extended, heavy duty kick stand and an extended carrier rack on the rear with provisions for stores to be carried above, and a pair of leather pannier bags on the sides. A chrome crash bar may be fitted at the front.

== Unloved design features ==
The top frame tube of the Tiger Cub was lower than normal, leaving the headstock poorly supported. Some rigidity was recovered by internal bracing of the petrol tank. A plain bearing on the timing side main bearing sometimes wore rapidly. The primary chain ran in a shallow oil-bath but if the level dropped, the chain could suffer lubrication failure and stretch. The chain was not tensioned - and even worse, the primary chaincase on early models was a slightly 'waisted' shape. A worn chain could strike both the inside of the cover and the crankcase itself, making the oil-level even more difficult to maintain in the future. Another common complaint was that the Cub would travel at highway speed (50 mph) for 1/2 hour and then stop unexpectedly. Some attributed this to overheating, but a cure was never found.

== Legislative boost ==
In 1961, the driving licence law for Triumph's home market in Great Britain was changed, restricting learner motorcyclists to a maximum of 250cc. The Tiger Cub became one of the most popular ways of getting onto two wheels.
