= Top, Oghuz =

Coordinates: 40°56′N 47°26′E

Top is a village and municipality in the Oghuz Rayon of Azerbaijan. It has a population of 370.
