= Topping =

Topping may refer to:

- Hill-topping, a mate-acquisition strategy amongst insects
- Topping, slang term for capital punishment, especially hanging or beheading
- Topping (surname), the name of several people
- Topping (agriculture), a practice used to prevent seed distribution
- Top, bottom and versatile, a sexual role
- Topping from the bottom, a BDSM term
- Topping cycle, a cycle used in power plants
- Topping out, a ceremony at the completion of a building construction
- Tree topping, the practice of removing branches from the top of a tree

Places:

- Topping, Ontario, a community in Southwestern Ontario, Canada
- Roseberry Topping, a hill in England

Foods:

- Pizza topping, a food on top of pizza
- Wet walnut topping, a dessert topping made from walnuts and maple syrup
- Whipped topping, a non-dairy whipped cream substitute

== See also ==
- Topper (disambiguation)
