= Top (surname) =

Top is a surname of a variety of origins, including Dutch, Yiddish, and Turkish. In Dutch, the name may be a patronymic or have referred to the top of someone's head, e.g. a hairstyle. In Yiddish, top means "pot" and is metonymic for a potter. People with this surname include:

- Brent L. Top (born 1953), American Mormon missionary and professor in moral education
- Damien Top (born 1963), French tenor, musicologist and conductor
- Edward Top (born 1972), Dutch classical composer
- Hennie Top (born 1956), Dutch racing cyclist
- Edwina Tops-Alexander (born 1974), Australian equestrian, wife of Jan Tops
- Emmanuel Top (born 1971), French acid techno music producer
- Jan Tops (born 1961), Dutch equestrian
- Jannick Top (born 1947), French bass player and composer
- Jonathan Top (born 1993), American soccer player
- Lisa Top (born 1996), Dutch artistic gymnast
- Luke Top (born 1980), Israeli-born American afro-pop musician
- Noordin Mohammad Top (1968–2009), Malaysian Muslim extremist
- Peleg Top (born 1967), Israeli graphic designer
- Refik Osman Top (1897–1957), Turkish footballer, referee, coach and sports columnist
- Ronald Top (born 1960), Dutch actor, director and producer
- Zach Top (born 1997), American singer-songwriter

== See also ==
- Carrot Top, stage name of Scott Thompson (born 1965), American stand-up comedian
