= Yamaha YA-1 =

1955 Yamaha YA-1
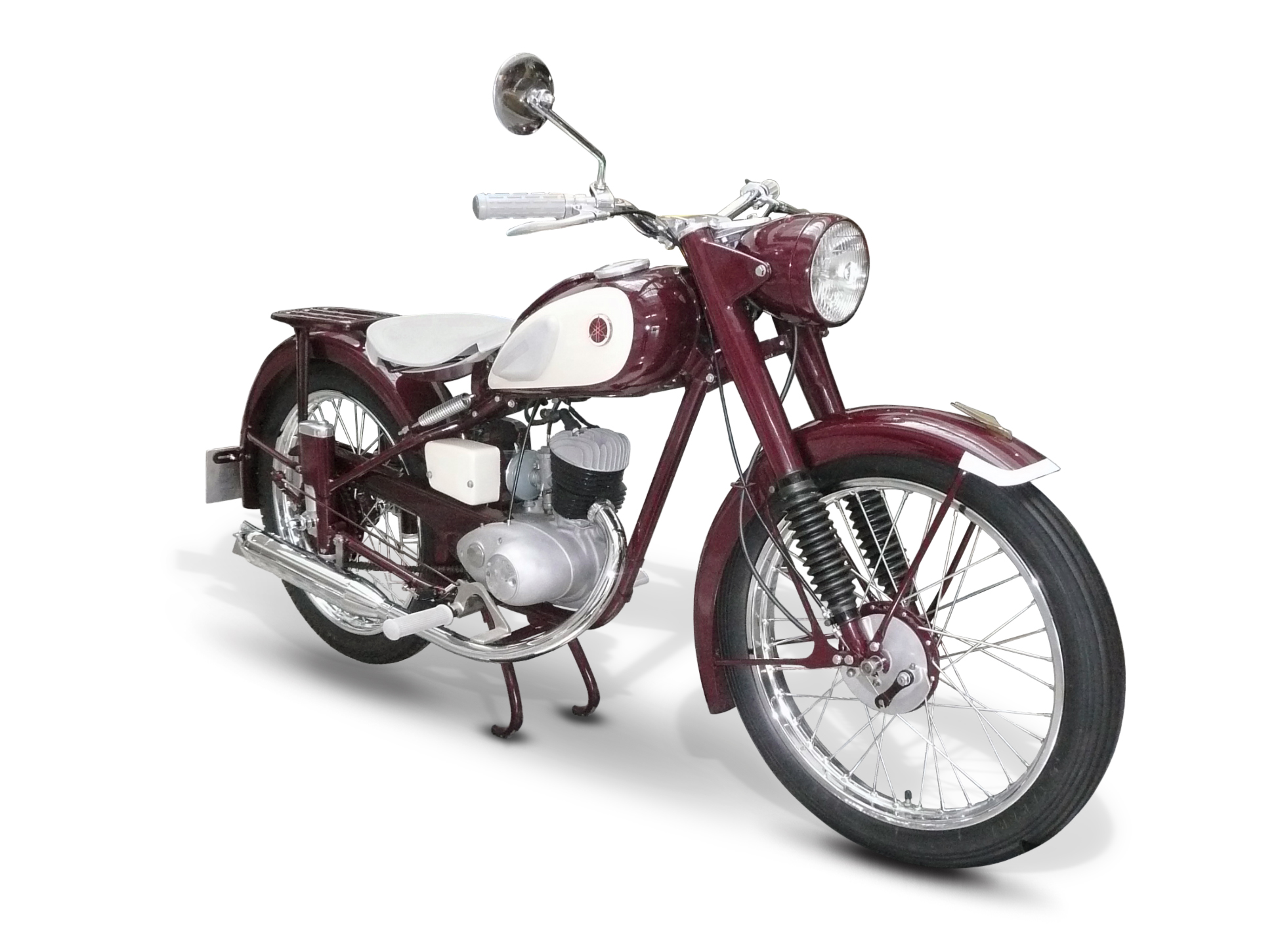
- Yamaha YA-1 on display at Yamaha Communication Plaza in Iwata, Shizuoka, Japan
- Manufacturer: Nippon Gakki Co., Ltd.
- Also called: Yamaha 125
- Production: 1955—1958
- Assembly: Hamakita, Shizuoka, Japan
- Predecessor: DKW RT 125
- Successor: Yamaha YC-1
- Class: On-road sports bike
- Engine: 123 cm^{3} (7.5 cu in) 2-stroke, air-cooled, single-cylinder
- Bore / stroke: 52 mm × 58 mm (2.0 in × 2.3 in)
- Power: 4.1 kW (5.5 hp) at 5000 rpm
- Torque: 9.4 N⋅m (6.9 lbf⋅ft) at 3300 rpm
- Ignition type: Dynamo
- Transmission: Manual 4-speed
- Suspension: F: Coil spring, R: Coil spring
- Tires: F: 2.75-19-2P, R: 2.75-19-4P
- Wheelbase: 1,290 mm (51 in)
- Dimensions: L: 1,980 mm (78 in); W: 660 mm (26 in); H: 925 mm (36.4 in)
- Weight: 94 kg (207 lb) (dry)
- Fuel capacity: 9.5 L (2.1 imp gal; 2.5 US gal)

The Yamaha YA-1 is the first motorcycle produced by the Yamaha Motor Company. It was made from 1955 to 1958. This was also the first vehicle in Japan to have a primary kick start system (allowing the engine to be started with the transmission in gear). The Society of Automotive Engineers of Japan (in Japanese), includes the 1955 Yamaha 125YA-1 as one of their 240 Landmarks of Japanese Automotive Technology.

== Background ==
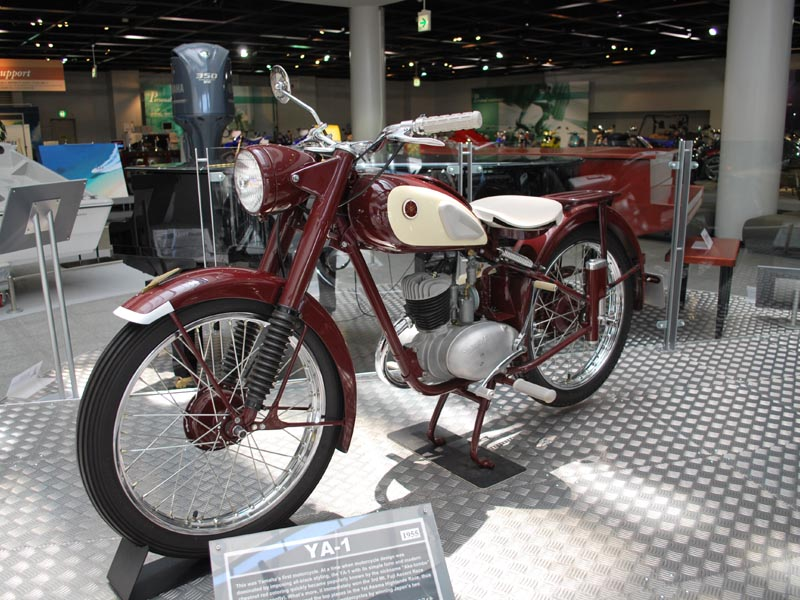
Yamaha YA-1 at Yamaha Communication Plaza in Iwata

In the early-1950s, Yamaha had to replace its musical instrument factories as they were severely damaged during the war. Yamaha was also facing the industrial conversion of factory machine tools that had been used during the war for the production of fuel tanks, wing parts, and propellers for aircraft of the Imperial Japanese Navy, such as the Mitsubishi A6M Zero fighter.

As in European countries, the motorcycle had become a widespread means of transportation in Japan after World War II due to ease of production and economy of purchase and use. Japanese motorcycle production increased from 10,000 units in 1950 to 750,000 in 1954, with over 100 domestic manufacturers.

Due to the strong expansion of the market, Yamaha Motor Co. decided to convert to the production of motorcycles, and found in the beginning the need to grapple with high specifications, for customers with elite, rather narrow needs, especially in view of the reduced number of production potential.

== The Red Dragonfly ==
In January 1955, Nippon Gakki's (Japan Instrument) Hamana Factory in Hamakita was ready to begin production of the YA-1, and the first bikes were delivered to dealers in February. This new motorcycle had been heavily influenced by the contemporary DKW model RT 125, and like the DKW was driven by a 125 cc two-stroke, single cylinder engine, but the YA-1 designers paid particular attention to materials, assembly, and engineering upgrades, such as going from a three-speed to a four-speed transmission. With confidence in the new direction that Genichi Kawakami was taking, Nippon Gakki founded Yamaha Motor Co., Ltd. on July 1, 1955, and made Kawakami the new company's first president. Staffed by 275 employees, the new motorcycle manufacturer built about 200 units per month by the end of 1955.

That same year, Yamaha entered its new YA-1 in the two biggest race events in Japan. They were the 3rd Mt. Fuji Ascent Race held in July 1955, and the 1st Asama Highlands Race in November. In these debut races, Yamaha won the 125 cc class.

The following year, the YA-1 won again in both the Light and Ultra-light classes of the Asama Highlands Race. The YA-1 soon established a reputation as a high-quality and reliable machine, which Japanese enthusiasts affectionately nicknamed the Aka-tombo (赤トンボ, "Red Dragonfly") for its slender shape and elegant chestnut red finish. Outstanding race performance had made the YA-1 much more desirable, in spite of its price of ¥138,000 in 1955 (for comparison, a male college graduate's starting salary was ¥10,780 on average).

Thanks to the popularity of the YA-1, a YB-1 model with a 4 cc larger displacement (allowing the engine to run slower) was produced later in 1955. A genuine successor to the YA-1, the 175 cc YC-1 was being produced by April 1956.

=== Primary starting system ===
The YA-1 was the first Japanese motorcycle to take advantage of a primary starting mechanism.

Previously, motorcycles with a non-primary starting system used the transmission input shaft and clutch hub to connect the kick-start lever to crankshaft. It was thus necessary for the rider to first put the transmission into neutral, and then to engage the clutch before the starting the engine by pushing down on the kick-start lever. With its primary starting system, the YA-1 engine is equipped with a mechanism in which the primary driven gear is turned by means of a kick idling gear and kick pinion. This enables the rider to simply pull the clutch lever on the handlebar (i.e., disengage the clutch) and then to kick-start engine, regardless of whether the transmission is in neutral or in (any) gear. This mechanism is now the established kick start system for motorcycles worldwide.

== Yamaha Y125 Moegi concept bike ==
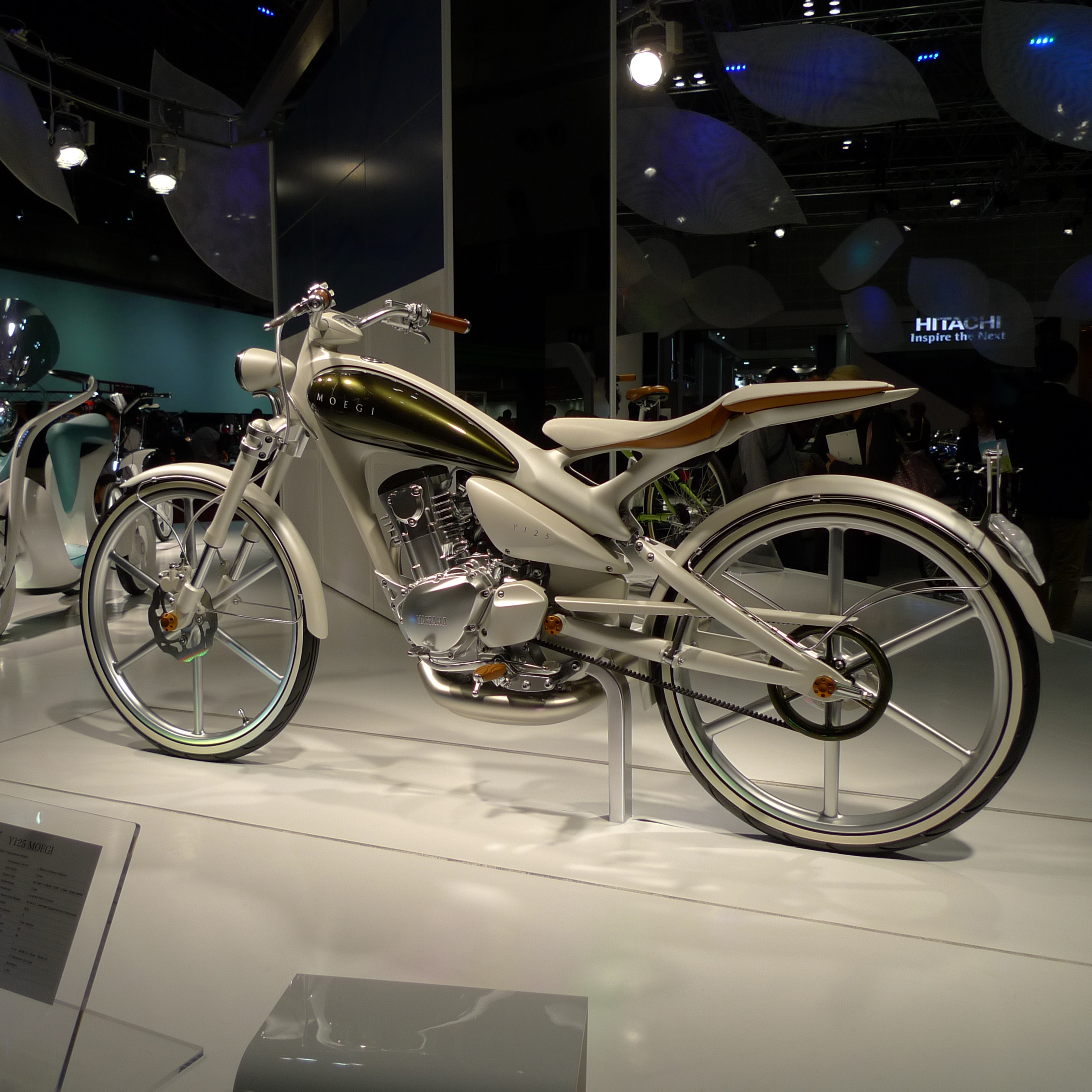
Yamaha Y125 Moegi concept bike, 2011 Tokyo Motor Show

The 2011 Tokyo Motor Show included a retrofuturistic concept motorcycle from Yamaha, designed along the lines of the 1955 YA-1. The Y125 Moegi is powered by an air-cooled 125cc single-cylinder engine (although this new engine is an SOHC four-stroke) sitting in an aluminum frame for a claimed weight of just 80 kilograms (180 pounds), which makes the Moegi (萌黄, "Light Green") significantly lighter than the YA-1 was. The Moegi uses a low-maintenance belt final drive and rides on 20-inch wheels.

The modified engine is based on the power plant of the YBR125 and Yamaha claims a fuel consumption of 80 km/L (230 mpg_{‑imp}; 190 mpg_{‑US}) for the Y125 Moegi, making it efficient personal transportation in urban environments.

== See also ==
- List of motorcycles of the 1950s
