= Topper (nickname) =

Topper is a nickname. Notable people with the nickname include:

- Topper Clemons (born 1963), American football player
- Topper Headon (born 1955), English rock drummer for The Clash
- Topper Rigney (1897–1972), American baseball player
- Rob Thomson (born 1963), Canadian baseball player, coach, and manager
- Jerry Toppazzini (1931–2012), Canadian hockey player
