= Henry Topping (footballer, born 1915) =

English footballer

Henry Westby Topping
Personal information
- Full name: Henry Westby Topping
- Date of birth: 28 September 1915
- Place of birth: Prescot, England
- Date of death: 11 July 2004 (aged 88)
- Place of death: St Helens, England
- Position: Full back

Senior career*
Years	Team	Apps	(Gls)
- Rossendale United
1938–1945	Stockport County	3	(0)
1945–1947	New Brighton	67	(0)
- Prescot Cables
- * Club domestic league appearances and goals

Henry Westby Topping (26 October 1915 – July 2004) was an English footballer, who played at full back for various clubs in the 1930s and 1940s.

== Football career ==
Topping was born in Prescot, Lancashire and started his football career at Rossendale United, before joining Stockport County in 1938. He remained with Stockport throughout World War II, including partnering his namesake Harry Topping in several wartime matches in 1941–42.

After the war he joined New Brighton, where he remained for two years making 67 Football League appearances. On his retirement from professional football, he joined Prescot Cables and was granted a benefit match in April 1951.

He also made several appearances for Manchester United during World War II. After his playing career with Stockport County, he went on to become player/manager.
