= Harley-Davidson Topper =

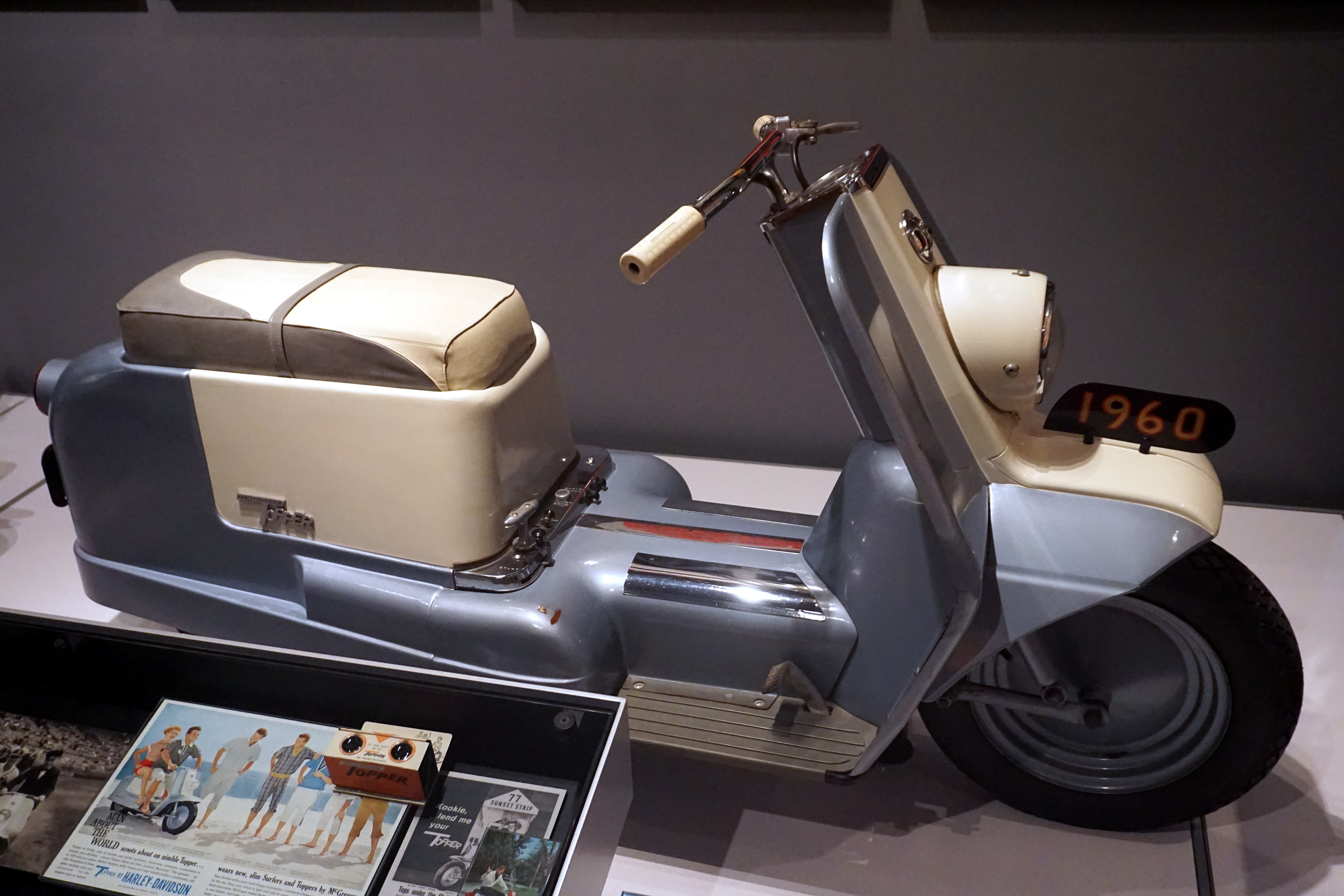
- 1960 Harley-Davidson Topper at the Harley-Davidson Museum
- Manufacturer: Harley-Davidson
- Production: 1960–1965
- Assembly: Milwaukee, Wisconsin, USA
- Class: scooter
- Engine: 10 cu in (164 cc) 2-stroke single-cylinder engine with reed valve
- Bore / stroke: 2.375 in × 2.281 in (60.3 mm × 57.9 mm)
- Compression ratio: A: 6.6:1; AH: 8.0:1
- Top speed: 46 mph (74 km/h)
- Power: 9 hp (6.7 kW)
- Transmission: continuously variable transmission, between 18:1 and 6:1
- Suspension: Front: leading link; Rear: swingarm, two extension springs
- Brakes: Front and rear: 5 in internal expanding drum
- Tires: 4.00 x 12
- Wheelbase: 51.5 in (1,308 mm)
- Dimensions: L: 75 in (1,905 mm); W: 24 in (610 mm); H: 37 in (940 mm)
- Seat height: 30 in (762 mm)
- Fuel capacity: 1.7 US gal (6.4 L)

The Harley-Davidson Topper was the only motor scooter that the Harley-Davidson Motor Company ever produced.

== Design and specifications ==
The Topper had a 165 cc (10.1 cu in) single-cylinder two-stroke engine mounted horizontally between the floorboards. The engine required a premixed gasoline/oil mixture. The starter was of the rope-recoil type similar to lawn mowers or the Lambretta E model. Unlike most scooters with enclosed engines, the Topper's engine did not have a cooling fan. It was expected that the low, horizontally mounted engine would be cooled by air passing under the scooter, but some Toppers developed overheating problems. The engine used a reed valve in its induction system.

The engine powered a continuously variable transmission called "Scootaway Drive" that included a safety device that did not allow the scooter to move from rest at engine speeds higher than 1800 rpm. Final drive was by an exposed roller chain.

The Topper had 5 inch internal expanding drum brakes on both wheels. The front brake was controlled by a hand lever on the left handlebar with a parking brake lock; the rear brake was controlled by a pedal.

The front body, front fender and floorboards of the Topper were made of stamped steel, and the engine cover and body were made of molded fiberglass. Storage space was provided under the seat; the manufacturer suggested storing extra containers of two-stroke oil there.

== Development ==
The main complaint from Topper owners was with the "Scootaway Drive" continuously variable transmission. Road grime would get into the transmission and cause the belt to slip. A new transmission, with the primary drive sealed in an oil bath, was introduced for 1961.

The Topper H was introduced in 1961 (sold through 1965) with a new alloy cylinder head that increased the compression ratio to 8.0:1, a reusable foam air filter, and revisions to the cylinder ports and air intake tube.

A detuned version of the Topper was also available, with the power restricted to 5 hp (3.7 kW). This was advertised as the "Topper U". The detuned Topper was made to comply with laws in some states in the United States that allowed motorcycles with rated engine power below a stated maximum to be operated without a license or to be operated on a special license by riders at a younger age than would be allowed a regular motorcycle license.

A Topper was used by the Milwaukee Brewers as a bullpen car from 1959 through 1995.

== Performance ==
In 1959 a Topper was ridden from Bakersfield, California to Death Valley and back without repair or adjustments requiring tools. The route went through Trona, to Stovepipe Wells, then to Badwater Basin, then to Whitney Portal, 7,851 feet (2,393 m) above sea level on the side of Mount Whitney. It then returned to Bakersfield.

== See also ==
- Zündapp Bella – a German scooter with similar front suspension and cooling system
- List of motorcycles of the 1950s
- List of motor scooter manufacturers and brands
