= Moscow Motorcycle Plant =

Moscow Motorcycle Plant (MMZ; Russian: Московский Мотоциклетный Завод, romanized: Moskovskiy Mototsikletniy Zavod) was a motorcycle manufacturer, based in Moscow, Russian SFSR.

== History ==
Moscow Motorcycle Plant commenced operations in 1941 building the M-72, a Soviet licensed copy of the BMW R71. With the German invasion of the Soviet Union, the plant was transferred east to the town of Irbit in the Ural region. The new plant was known as Irbit Motorcycle Factory.

In 1946, the Moscow plant was re-established to manufacture the M-1A Moskva, (the DKW RT 125 taken as war reparations). In 1951 the plant was relocated to Minsk, Byelorussia, and renamed Minsk Motovelo Zavod (Минский Мотовелозавод).
