= Harry Topping =

English footballer (1913–2001)

Personal information
- Date of birth: 21 September 1913
- Place of birth: Kearsley, England
- Date of death: 2001 (aged 87–88)
- Height: 5 ft 8 1/2 in (1.74 m)
- Position: Full-back

Senior career*
| Years | Team | Apps | (Gls) |
| 1935 | Manchester City | 0 | (0) |
| 1936–1937 | Exeter City | 1 | (0) |
| 1937–1938 | New Brighton | 5 | (0) |
| 1945–1946 | Bristol Rovers | 0 | (0) |

Managerial career
- 1948–1950: RFC Rotterdam
- 1950–1951: Feyenoord
- 1951–1952: PSV
- * Club domestic league appearances and goals

Harry Topping (21 September 1913 – 2001) was an English football player (who played at full-back) and coach.

== Playing career ==
Topping was born in Kearsley, Lancashire and spent time with several Football League clubs, including Manchester City and Exeter City, where he made one league appearance, before a short spell at New Brighton.

During World War II he played for Stockport County, where he partnered his namesake Henry Westby Topping in several wartime matches in 1941–42. He played for Bristol Rovers in the FA Cup campaign of 1945–46.

== Coaching career ==
As a football coach, Topping managed RFC Rotterdam and two of the Netherlands' biggest clubs in the early 1950s — Feyenoord between 1950 and 1951, and PSV between 1951 and 1952.

He was coach to Norwich City in their run to the 1958–59 FA Cup semi-final. After leaving Norwich he coached Torquay United.
