= MZ ES 125/150 =

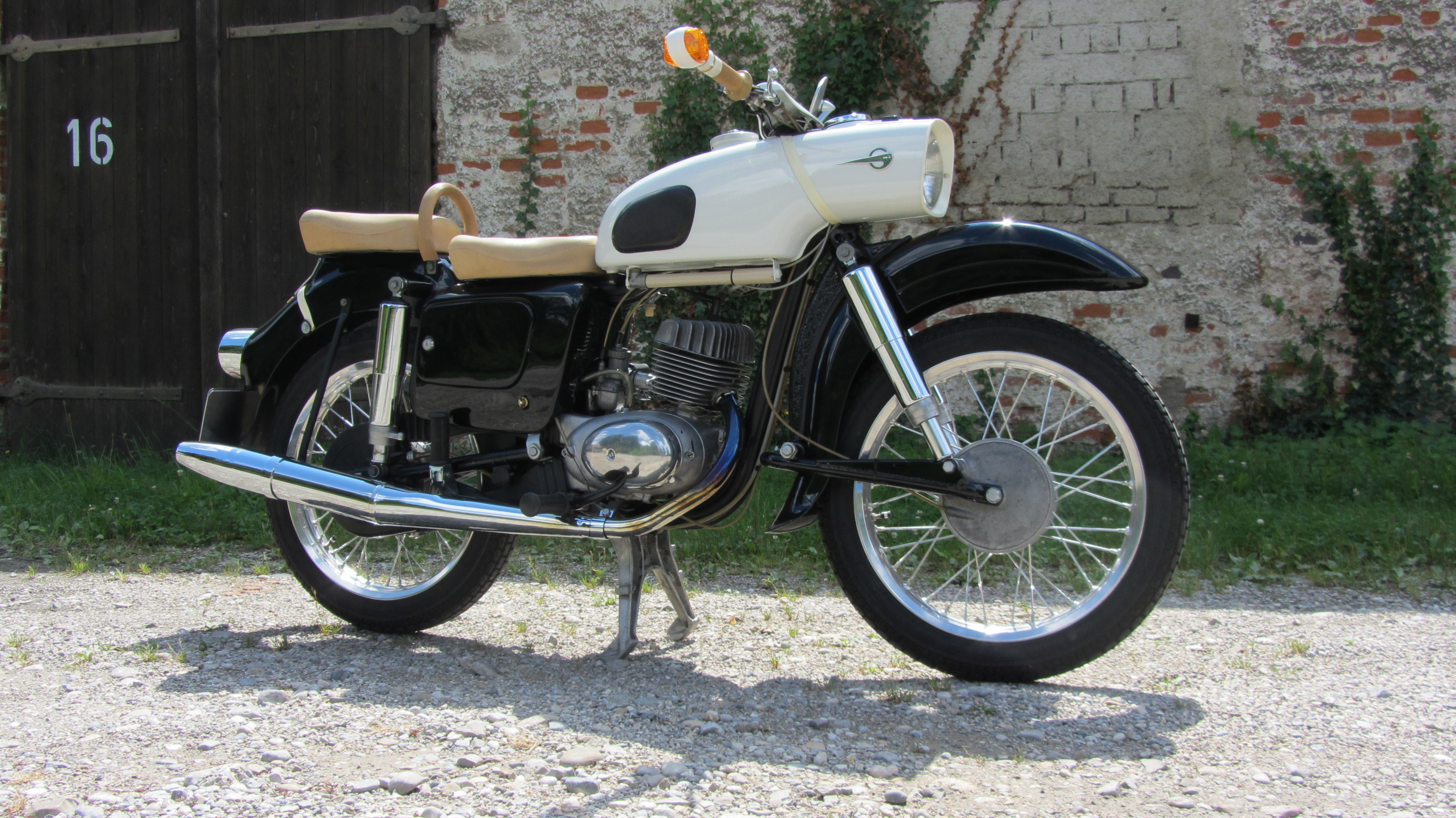
- MZ ES 150 (built in 1967)
- Manufacturer: VEB Motorradwerk Zschopau
- Production: 1962–1977
- Predecessor: MZ 125/3
- Successor: MZ ETS 125/150
- Engine: → see table
- Related: MZ ES 250

The motorcycles MZ ES 125 and MZ ES 150 were built at the VEB Motorradwerk Zschopau between 1962 and 1977. They supplemented the ES 175 and ES 250 manufactured since 1956 and replaced the MZ 125/3. The abbreviation ES in the model name stood for Einzylinder, Schwinge (english: Single cylinder, Swingarm).

== Technical details ==
=== chassis ===
The frame was innovative both in terms of design and manufacturing. Instead of a welded or soldered tubular frame, it had a pressed steel frame. The two frame halves were connected exclusively by flanging via a fold without any weld points. This increased torsional rigidity by 20%. It also eliminated the need to import an expensive multi-spot welding device. This frame design was used with minor modifications in the MZ TS 125/150 series until 1985. A comfortable solid swing arm design was chosen for the chassis, similar to the larger series. Like the rear seat carrier, the front wheel carrier was cast from light alloy. The reduced mass around the steering axis compared to a steel component, as well as the relatively large 18" wheels, had a significant impact on driving stability. Nevertheless, there was a certain tendency for the handlebars to sway, which could occur, for example, as a result of wheels that were not running perfectly true or incorrect balancing. The solid hub drum brakes were essentially adopted unchanged from the previous series. The now internal operating levers from off-road sports contributed to the closed appearance of the machines.

=== drive ===
The engines were developed from the standard engine already used in the MZ 125/3 and the scooter SR59: As early as the mid-1950s, MZ modified the RT 125 engines for the IWL in Ludwigsfelde. One of the modifications to the MZ engines, starting with the SR59 scooter, was the increase in displacement to 150 cc, as the heavy scooters with the 125 cc engine achieved unsatisfactory performance. Thus, the ES 150, the first MZ model with a 150 cc displacement, came onto the market. Engines from the ES 150 were also used in the IWL scooter Troll until the end of 1964.

The crankshaft was redesigned; the crankshaft bearings were no longer lubricated by the mixture, but by the transmission oil. The connecting rod was converted to needle bearings. The fuel-to-oil ratio could be reduced to 33 : 1. Composite cast iron cylinders were also available. The gray cast iron cylinder liner was encased in an aluminum cylinder body. Characteristic features of the engine were a favorable torque curve across a wide speed range, the well-damped exhaust noise and full-throttle stability typical of MZ, but also the tendency to glow ignitions after the engine has been switched off. A special feature of the carburetor from 1964 onwards was the possibility that turning the throttle grip beyond the zero position led to a complete interruption of the fuel supply. In this way, irregular ignitions when driving downhill or even glow ignitions could be suppressed. The two variants 125 and 150 differed only in the piston, piston pin, cylinder, cylinder head, carburetor, intake manifold and secondary transmission.

=== equipment ===
A special feature is the frame-mounted headlight. The headlight housing, similar to the DKW Hummel 115, formed an extension of the seat-fuel tank line. The series owes its nickname "racing flashlight" to this design. The motor trade press praised the exterior of the small ES series as a harmonious combination of functional and aesthetic form, as well as the excellent seating position and location of all controls. For the first time, a production motorcycle featured a headlight with an asymmetrical low beam. In contemporary reports, the headlight illumination was therefore considered exemplary, but the unchanged 6-volt system with 45/40 W headlight output limited the possibilities. The ignition system was a contact breaker with a 6-volt battery under the left side cover.

The bikes were optionally equipped with a bench seat or individual seats. The proven chain guard, consisting of a plastic chain case and elastic chain guard tubes, was also used here. The ES was equipped with 18-inch spoked wheels and 3.00-18 tubular tires. With an air pump and extensive onboard tools, the ES was well-equipped for breakdowns. Knee plates were available as accessories.

== Facelift ==
Over the course of their production run the machines underwent continuous external and technical changes. The paint scheme and color scheme were modified in 1964. To improve thermal stability, the cooling fins were enlarged in 1965. The cylinder body, reminiscent of the "ancestor" DKW RT 125, was replaced by a "wide-finned cylinder." The central float starting carburetor replaced the previous carburetor. MZ gave the left cover of the gearbox housing an angular shape. In 1967, the shape of the indicators changed. From 1968 onwards, a segment speedometer replaced the previous round speedometer.

In 1969, MZ redesigned the engines. Through modifications to the intake system (air filter, carburetor, intake manifold), the exhaust, as well as the valve timing and compression, power was increased. At the same time, the carburetor cover was removed. The tapered exhaust system gave way to a new, angled exhaust. The model series was now called ES 125/1 Trophy and received the corresponding lettering on the tank. This was due to the six-time winner of the World Trophy at the International Six Days Trial.

With the telescopic fork of the ETS 250, the tank of the Simson Sperber, and a different seat, the ES 125/150 Trophy became the ETS 125/150 in 1970. Production of the ES models continued in parallel. Unlike the larger ES models, the ES 125/150/1 Trophy remained in the range alongside the TS models even after 1973, in order to continue to satisfy fans of the comfortable full-swinging chassis. With silver fenders, exposed suspension struts (already available since 1971), the flat seat of the TS, new colors, and the new MZ logo on the tank, the models were given a sportier appearance. However, production volume declined. In 1977, the engine, whose basic design dates back to the 1930s, was revised one last time. The bearings of the piston pin, the connecting rod on the crankshaft, and the crankshaft were modified to allow the use of a fuel-to-oil ratio 50 : 1. In the same year, production of the small ES models was finally discontinued.

== Receptions ==
In the contemporary endurance test over 12,000 km The ES 150 (first version) failed to fully meet the high expectations of a Q-rated vehicle. While the engine, transmission, and chassis were trouble-free and showed no unusual wear, apart from a prematurely worn clutch, some parts could not withstand the vibrations. Two broken wires and three alternator failures each caused the vehicle to break down. The front fender repeatedly caused problems with cracking. Other vibration-related defects included a malfunctioning speedometer, rattling noises, a prematurely worn tire, and a loose exhaust manifold. There were also regular problems with the spark plug (plug bridges), which were related to the inferior fuel quality at the time. In a 1963 test report, both models reached the official top speed with the driver sitting upright and reached 100 km/h and 103 km/h, respectively, with the driver lying down.

In the test report for the ES 150/1, however, the Q quality mark for the highest quality was defended. The top speed was now 108 km/h (67 mph) with the rider lying down. The increased performance was praised, especially in light of the maintained full-throttle stability and the moderate fuel consumption of 3.7 l/100 km. Externally, the machine no longer reflected contemporary tastes, but at the same time, it was emphasized that switching to a telescopic front fork would not necessarily result in an improvement in handling.

Frequent problems with the ES 125/150 engine occurred with the crankshaft journal (accessible from the right side).

A test by the US magazine Cycle World in 1965 concluded:

In riding the MZ, we became especially aware that the machine is not made for the sport; it is a working-man's motorcycle, […]. Everything seems to be made for durability, even to a complete enclosure around the rear chain, which should extend its life. It starts easily, and potters along at low and medium speeds very smoothly. The finish is moderately good; certainly more impressive than the styling, which was peculiar, to be charitable. In all, the bike is nothing to get excited about, but it gives the impression of being able to take you there, and return, for a lot of miles.

—

== Specifications ==
	ES 125	ES 125/1 Trophy	ES 150	ES 150/1 Trophy
image		ES 125/1 Trophy	ES 150	ES 150/1
Production	1962–1969	1969–1977	1962–1969	1969–1977
Engine	airstream-cooled single cylinder Two-stroke engine, Kick start			
Design	piston-controlled inlet port			
Bore × Stroke	52 mm × 58 mm (2.0 in × 2.3 in)		56 mm × 58 mm (2.2 in × 2.3 in)	
Displacement	123 cc (7.5 cu in)		143 cc (8.7 cu in)	
Compression ratio	9 : 1			
Power rating	8.5 PS (6.3 kW) at 5800/min	10 PS (7.4 kW) at 6300/min	10 PS (7.4 kW) at 5500/min	11.5 PS (8.5 kW) at 6000/min
max. Torque	12.3 N⋅m (9.1 lbf⋅ft) at 5500/min		14.7 N⋅m (10.8 lbf⋅ft) at 5000/min	
Introduction of fuel	carburetor (BVF 22 KNB 1-3)		carburetor (24 KN 1-2)	
Lubrication	total-loss lubrication system, fuel-to-oil ratio 33 : 1			
Ignition system	battery ignition, contact-controlled			
Alternator	DC dynamo generator, 6 V – 60–90 W			
Battery	6 V – 12 Ah			
On-board voltage	6 V			
Clutch	multi-disk clutch in oil bath, mechanically operated			
Transmission	4-speed helical gearbox, claw-switched; chain drive (fully encapsulated)			
Frame	pressed steel frame			
Dimension (L × W × H)	1,900 mm × 750 mm × 1,150 mm (75 in × 30 in × 45 in)			
Wheelbase	1,270 mm (50 in)			
Front suspension	pushed swingarm, hydraulically damped, suspension 150 mm (5.9 in)			
Rear suspension	swingarm, 2 struts, suspension 100 mm (3.9 in), adjustable spring base			
Front rim size	wire-spoke wheel, 1.85 x 18″	wire-spoke wheel, 1.6 x 18″	wire-spoke wheel, 1.85 x 18″	wire-spoke wheel, 1.6 x 18″
Rear rim size	wire-spoke wheel, 1.85 x 18″			
Front tire	3.00–18 M/C 52S TT		2.75–18 M/C 48P TT	
Rear tire	3.00–18 M/C 52S TT		3.00–18 M/C 52S TT	
Front brake	simplex drum brake, diameter 150 mm (5.9 in), bowden cable operated			
Rear brake	simplex drum brake, diameter 150 mm (5.9 in), bowden cable operated			
Curb weight	112 kg (247 lb)	115 kg (254 lb)	112 kg (247 lb)	115 kg (254 lb)
Maximum load	270 kg (600 lb)			
Fuel capacity	12 l (reserve: 1.5 l)			
Top speed	90 km/h (56 mph)	100 km/h (62 mph)	95 km/h (59 mph)	105 km/h (65 mph)

== Number of units ==
The ES 125/150 series, with 16 years of production, is the longest-produced MZ motorcycle series. However, from 1974 onwards, only comparatively few machines were produced in parallel with the TS series. The total number of units manufactured during this period remains unclear. The figure of 900,000 cited in some publications must be questioned, especially since "only" about 500,000 units of the TS 125/150 series were produced in 13 years (1972–1985). This number (900,000) probably referred to the combined production of both series (ES 125/150 + TS 125/150). From the data provided by the members of the MZ Forum (frame number + production date), it can be deduced that probably no more than 190,308 ES 150 (1962–1969), 150,116 ES 150/1 (1962–1977), 63,492 ES 125 (1962–1969) and 50,332 ES 125/1 (1969–1977), i.e. a total of 454,248 machines, were built. In addition, there were 557 off-road motorcycles from the small ES 125/G series (1966–1971). A French publication roughly agrees on a total of 454,310 machines. The ES 125/150 series is thus one of the most frequently produced motorcycles worldwide.
