= MZ TS 250 =

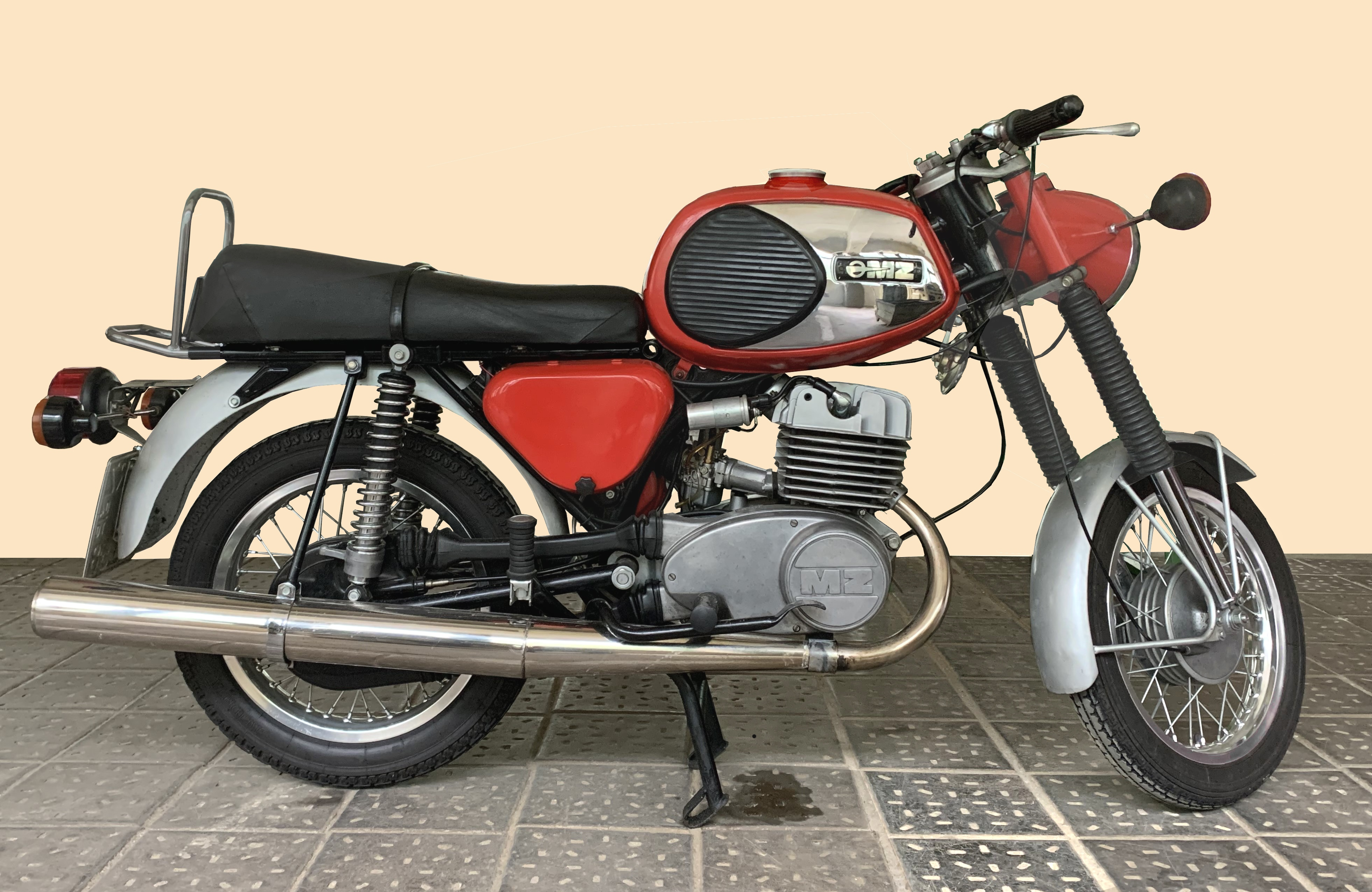
- MZ TS 250
- Manufacturer: VEB Motorradwerk Zschopau
- Also called: 250 Trophy Sprint (FR)
- Production: 1973–1976
- Predecessor: MZ ES 250/2, MZ ETS 250
- Successor: MZ TS 250/1
- Engine: → see table
- Related: MZ TS 125/150

The motorcycles of the MZ TS 250 series were built at the VEB Motorradwerk Zschopau between 1973 and 1976. The manufacturer presented the newly developed TS 250 to the public for the first time at the Leipzig Autumn Fair in 1972 and began mass production in April 1973. In June of the same year, the TS series was supplemented by the MZ TS 125 and TS 150.

On September 1, 1976, the series production of the successor model TS 250/1 began, which featured a few changes compared to the TS 250. The motorcycle was presented at the Leipzig Autumn Fair that started on September 5, 1976.

The abbreviation TS in the model name stood for Teleskopgabel, Schwinge (english: Telescopic fork, Swingarm).

== TS 250 ==
=== Technical details ===
The chassis is a parallel tube backbone frame with a telescopic fork at the front and a long swing arm at the rear. The design principle of the frame was derived from the ETS 250/G, which had already been tried and tested for 10 years in Enduro. The rear section is also made of tubes. The manufacturer MZ particularly highlighted the increased bending stiffness in the longitudinal axis of 50% and the torsional stiffness of 35% compared to the ETS 250/G. In contrast to the street machine ETS 250, the rim size (16 inches) is the same at the front and rear. The telescopic fork has exposed guide tubes.

A new modern engine had already been developed for the newly designed frame at the end of the 1960s. The housing was divided horizontally, which simplified the assembly of the crankshaft and 5-speed gearbox. The drive unit also had 12-volt electrics, an optional electric starter and separate lubrication. However, the investments in tools and machines required for series production were not approved by the government of the GDR.

This meant that the MM 250/2 engine from the ES and ETS models had to be used. It was slightly further developed and called MM 250/3. This engine is a airstream-cooled single cylinder Two-Stroke. The fuel-to-oil ratio could reduced from 30 : 1 to 50 : 1. The kickstart and gear lever as well as the alternator cover were changed. A new development was the elastic engine suspension at the base of the frame and suspension with "Silentblock" at the cylinder head. The carburetor of the engine is a central float carburetor 30N 2–3 from the Berliner Vergaser-Fabrik. The two pipes of the frame bridge are integrated into the intake air system and reduce the intake noise. The speedometer drive was moved from the gearbox output to the rear wheel hub.

As with all MZ models, starting with the RT 125/1, the secondary chain is fully encapsulated with the chain guard made of rubber hoses and the chain case made of Duroplast on the rear wheel hub.

The electrical system: DC alternator with 60 W output, headlights with 170 mm diameter, asymmetrical dipped beam with 45/40 W dual-filament bulb and 21 W output on the back.

When the TS 250 series began, MZ planned to move away from motorcycle sidecars and did not plan to equip the bike with sidecars. In response to customer requests and not least due to intervention by the editorial staff of the magazine Kraftfahrzeugtechnik, a sidecar connection was added. Series production of frames suitable for sidecars began in December 1974. A subsequent conversion of a solo frame with the necessary parts is possible and permissible. The "Superelastik" sidecar was manufactured by Stoye-Fahrzeugbau-Leipzig (from 1972 a branch of VEB Motorradwerk Zschopau). A cargo sidecar could be supplied as an option.

=== Facelift ===
During the production period of the TS 250 there were continuous external and technical changes. When series production began, it was possible to choose between the standard and luxury versions. The de Luxe has a 16 l fuel tank (12 l in the standard version) and chrome-plated or polished parts. Both could be equipped with flat or high handlebars. A rear and side luggage rack were available as accessories.

=== Reception ===
The magazines Kraftfahrzeugtechnik and Der deutsche Straßenverkehr each tested a TS 250 from the pilot series in 1973. The seating position, the characteristics of the engine in the upper speed range, the handling on the road and unpaved paths as well as the suspension characteristics of the telescopic fork were all rated positively. The poor quality of the tires from the supplier, background noises from disrupted combustion processes and when shifting gears as well as a rattling clutch were criticized.

The conclusion of the Kraftfahrzeugtechnik after 10,000 kilometers of endurance testing with a 1974 machine was mostly positive. The driving characteristics, straight-line stability, seating position and handling were all highlighted positively. There were no significant failures to complain about. (A piston seizure that occurred at around 3050 kilometers was due to a loose screw on the intake manifold and thus false air.) The engine characteristics were rated as good overall, but a five-speed gearbox was desired. The grip properties of the tires, which had already been criticized at the beginning of the test, could not be offset by their high durability (at the end of the test, 70 percent of the tread depth was still present at the front and 50 percent at the rear). The moderate comfort of the seat was also judged to be in need of improvement.

Both magazines also assessed the sidecar operation. Given that the TS has a telescopic fork and the ES, previously produced by MZ, has a front swing arm, the assessments of driving stability were only satisfactory. As with the solo machine, the tire quality was criticized. The fuel consumption values appeared to be too high. The braking effect was considered to be in need of improvement, consideration was given to using a disc brake system and a higher engine power was desired.

=== Special models ===
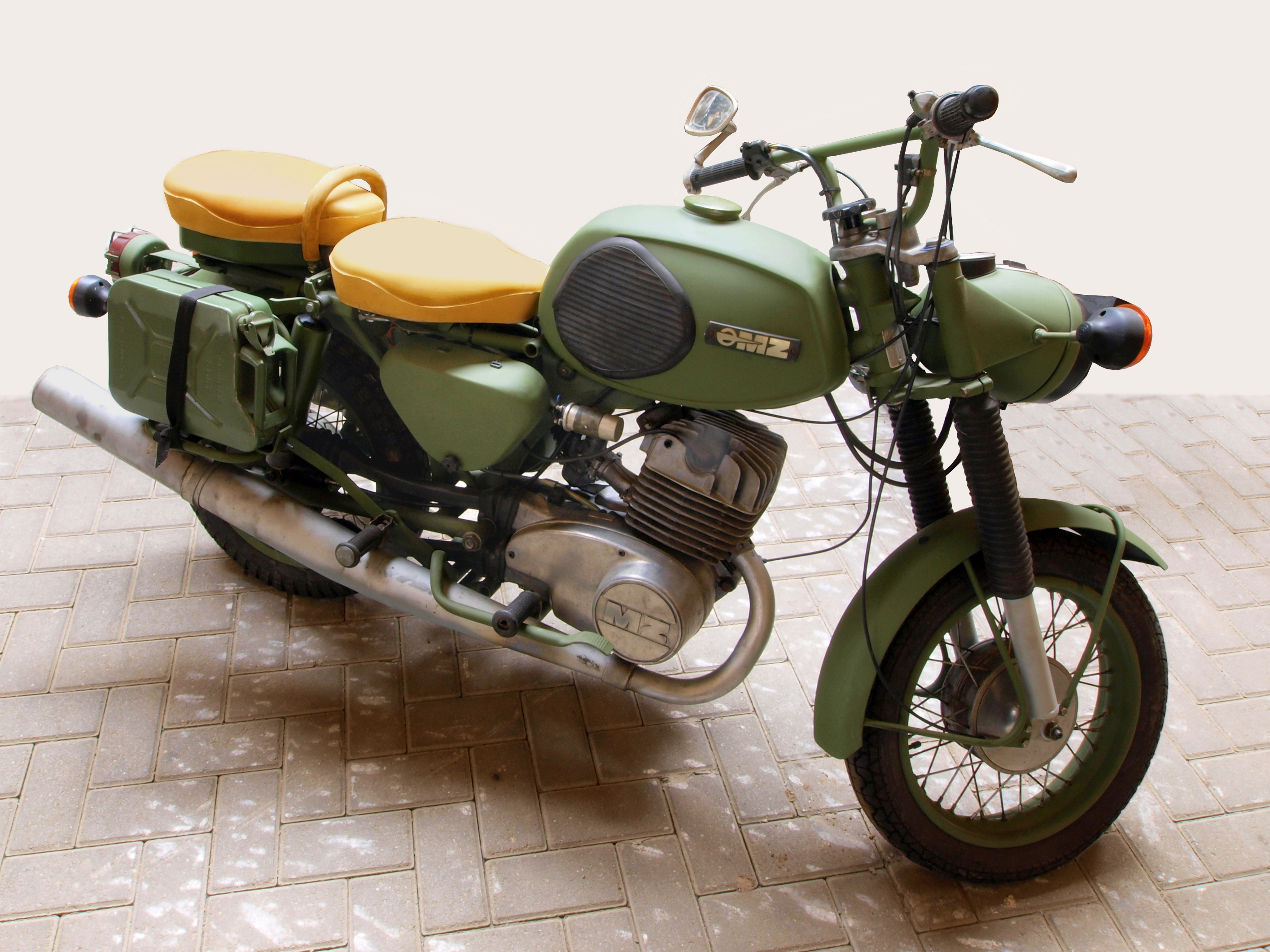
MZ TS 250 A

A special model was the TS 250 A for the National People's Army. It has, among other things, individual seats, side luggage racks, tires with a deeper profile, a slightly raised exhaust system and a paint job similar to that of military vehicles. From 1973 to 1976, 4118 units were produced, of which 3370 (with a special beige paint job) were exported to Iraq. In 1975, there were 40 units of the special model TS 250/E (Eskort); from 1974 to 1976, there were 1398 units of the special model TS 250/F (Funkkrad) for the Volkspolizei. In 1975, 950 units of the special model TS 250/M (Militia) were built, 550 of which were exported to Poland.

=== Number of units ===
Including the pre-series (61 units in 1972), a total of 101,015 MZ TS 250s were produced from 1973 to 1976 (excluding special models).

== TS 250/1 ==
MZ TS 250/1
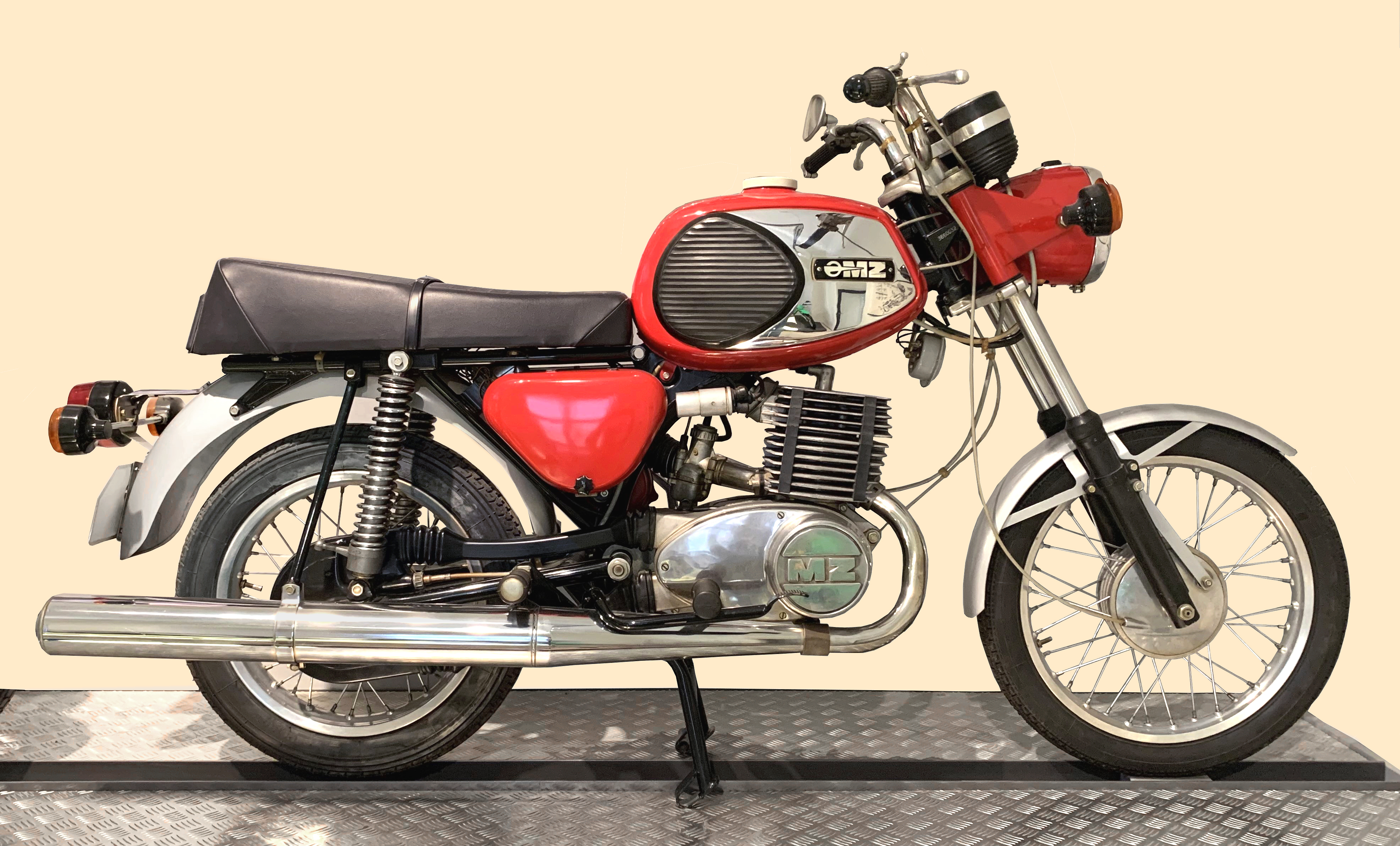
- MZ TS 250/1, built in 1976
- Manufacturer: VEB Motorradwerk Zschopau
- Also called: Supa 5 (GB)
- Production: 1976–1981
- Predecessor: MZ TS 250
- Successor: MZ ETZ 250
- Engine: → see table

=== Technical details ===
Apart from many design details, the most significant changes concern the engine and the switch to an 18-inch front wheel rim like on the small TS. For the first time at MZ, a series engine was given a five-speed gearbox. This improved traction. A newly designed step-by-step switch with over-shift lock made gear shifting easier. The engine was given a tachometer drive on the crankshaft. The clutch bearing was also changed, which prevented the noise when it was operated. There were also minor changes to the kick start, the crankshaft bearings, the piston and the cylinder, the cylinder cover and the intake and ignition systems. The cylinder cover was ribbed horizontally and in order to dampen the structure-borne sound emissions of the cylinder, two "damping combs" were provided vertically on both sides over all ribs including the cylinder cover.

The TS received the tachometer in the luxury version. The speedometer and tachometer are mounted in instrument holders at the top of the telescopic fork.

Like the last version of the TS 250, the TS 250/1 can be used as a sidecar.

=== Reception ===
The magazine Kraftfahrzeugtechnik highlighted the performance of the engine with the long-desired five-speed gearbox with better shifting and better traction and attested to a "livelier" driving style compared to the previous model with four-speed gearbox. The 18-inch front wheel rim was also rated positively, with the resulting better driving characteristics.

Kraftfahrzeugtechnik and Der deutsche Straßenverkehr tested a TS 250/1 over a distance of 4000 kilometers. The driving performance was judged to be very good, and the improved braking deceleration compared to the TS 250 was also highlighted.

Both magazines also tested the sidecar. While the previous model with sidecar was judged to be only satisfactory, the new engine had a positive effect on sidecar operation. The braking deceleration was rated positively, but still seemed to have room for improvement.

=== Special models ===
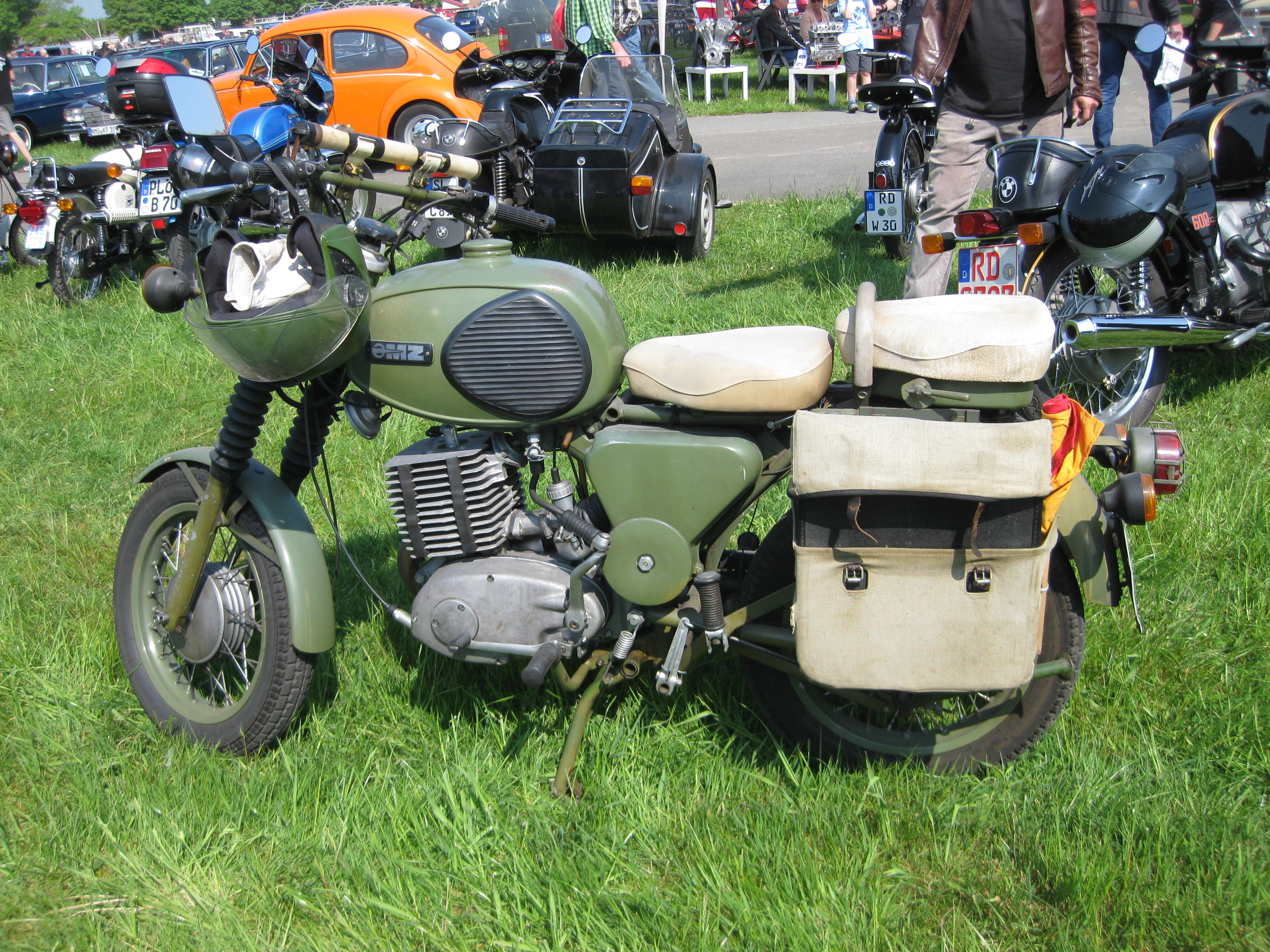
MZ TS 250/1 A

As with its predecessor, there was a special model for the National People's Army, the TS 250/1 A. The features of individual seats, side luggage racks, deeper profile tires, slightly raised exhaust system and military paintwork were the same as the previous model. From 1977 to 1983, 10,723 units were produced, of which 2,646 were for export to Iraq.

There was also a special model TS 250/1F for the Volkspolizei. The model had a large windshield, leg guards, individual seats and a side pannier. The radio was located on the other side, protected from the weather. In 1980, special models were again made for the Volkspolizei. This time the radio was placed in the place of the pillion seat to improve handling. Between 1976 and 1980, 399 of these special models were built, 220 of which were exported to Bulgaria.

From 1979 to 1981, 1500 units of the special model TS 250/1M (Militia) were produced and exported to Poland.

=== Number of units ===
From 1976 to 1981, a total of 167,925 units were produced (excluding special models).

== Specifications ==
=== Solo motorcycles ===
	TS 250	TS 250/1
Production	1973–1976	1976–1981
Engine	airstream-cooled single cylinder Two-stroke engine, Kick start	
Design	piston-controlled inlet port	
Bore × Stroke	69 mm × 65 mm (2.7 in × 2.6 in)	
Displacement	244 cc (14.9 cu in)	
Compression ratio	10 : 1	
Power rating	19 PS (14 kW) at 5800/min	19.3 PS (14.2 kW) at 5600/min; throttled: 17 PS (13 kW) at 5400/min
max. Torque	25.5 N⋅m (18.8 lbf⋅ft) at 4700/min	25.5 N⋅m (18.8 lbf⋅ft) at 4600/min; throttled: 23.5 N⋅m (17.3 lbf⋅ft) at 4600/min
Introduction of fuel	BVF-carburetor, intake diameter 30 mm (1.2 in)	
Lubrication	total-loss lubrication system, fuel-to-oil ratio 50 : 1	
Ignition system	battery ignition, contact-controlled	
Alternator	DC dynamo generator, 6 V – 90 W	
Battery	6 V – 12 Ah	
On-board voltage	6 V	
Clutch	multi-disk clutch in oil bath, mechanically operated	
Transmission	4-speed helical gearbox, claw-switched; chain drive (fully encapsulated)	5-speed helical gearbox, claw-switched; chain drive (fully encapsulated)
Frame	parallel tube backbone frame	
Dimension (L × W × H)	2,050 mm × 735 mm × 1,100 mm (80.7 in × 28.9 in × 43.3 in) with high handlebar; 2,050 mm × 620 mm × 1,040 mm (81 in × 24 in × 41 in) with flat handlebar	2,075 mm × 865 mm × 1,195 mm (81.7 in × 34.1 in × 47.0 in) with high handlebar; 2,075 mm × 730 mm × 1,136 mm (81.7 in × 28.7 in × 44.7 in) with flat handlebar
Wheelbase	1,355 mm (53.3 in)	
Seat height	770 mm (30 in)	
Front suspension	telescopic fork, hydraulically damped, not adjustable, suspension 185 mm (7.3 in)	
Rear suspension	swingarm, 2 struts, suspension 105 mm (4.1 in), adjustable spring base	
Front rim size	wire-spoke wheel, 1.85 × 16″	wire-spoke wheel, 1.6 × 18″
Rear rim size	wire-spoke wheel, 2.15 × 16″	
Front tire	3.00-16 48P TT	2.75-18 48P TT
Rear tire	3.50-16 58P TT	
Front brake	simplex drum brake, diameter 160 mm (6.3 in), bowden cable operated	
Rear brake	simplex drum brake, diameter 160 mm (6.3 in), mechanically operated via linkage	
Curb weight	130 kg (290 lb)	
Maximum load	320 kg (710 lb)	
Fuel capacity	17.5 l (reserve 1.5 l)	
Top speed	120 km/h (75 mph)	

=== Sidecars ===
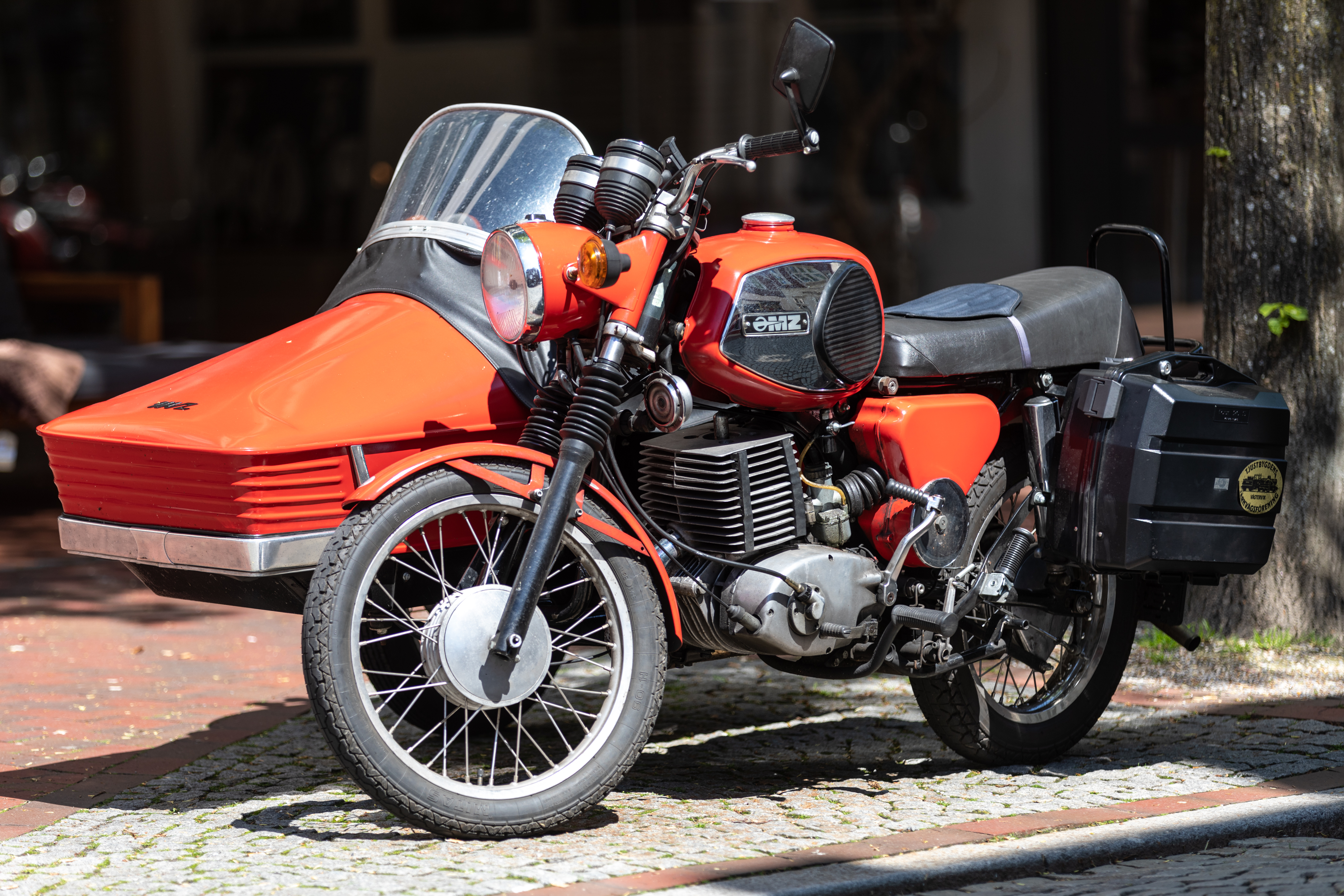
MZ TS 250/1 with sidecar Superelastik

	TS 250 with sidecar Superelastik	TS 250/1 with sidecar Superelastik
Production	1974–1976	1976–1981
Sidecar Frame	welded sheet metal profiles, 3 connection points to motorcycle frame	
Length	2,075 mm (81.7 in)	
Width	1,610 mm (63 in)	
Sidecar suspension	swingarm, 2 struts, suspension 100 mm (3.9 in)	
Sidecar rim size	wire-spoke wheel, 2,15 × 16″	
Sidecar tire	3.50-16 58P TT	
Sidecar brake	simplex drum brake, diameter 150 mm (5.9 in), mechanically operated via linkage	
Curb weight	232 kg (511 lb); cargo sidecar: 228 kg (503 lb)	
Maximum load	503 kg (1,109 lb)	
Maximum loading sidecar	112 kg (247 lb); cargo sidecar: 125 kg (276 lb)	
Top speed	85–100 km/h (53–62 mph)	

== Trivia ==
In 1977, the Briton David Baynam made a motorcycle touring from the Arctic Circle in Finland to Cape Town, covering more than 35,000 mi on the MZ TS 250 he had chosen for the trip. A year later, he rode the successor model TS 250/1 (marketed in Great Britain as the “MZ Supa 5”) between 11 June 1978 and 18 April 1979 from New York across North and South America, ending in Brazil, a distance of around 48,000 mi. According to him, the TS 250/1 was provided to him free of charge by VEB MZ. In 1990, the company, now trading as Motorradwerk Zschopau GmbH, quoted from a letter Baynam had written to the factory in 1979 in its own magazine:

Es ist keine Übertreibung zu sagen, daß viele Leute beeindruckt waren von der Leistung der MZ. Es ist bestimmt das beste von den 25 Motorrädern, die ich besessen habe.

It is no exaggeration to say that many people were impressed with the performance of the MZ. It's certainly the best of the 25 motorcycles I've owned.
