= MZ ETS 250 =

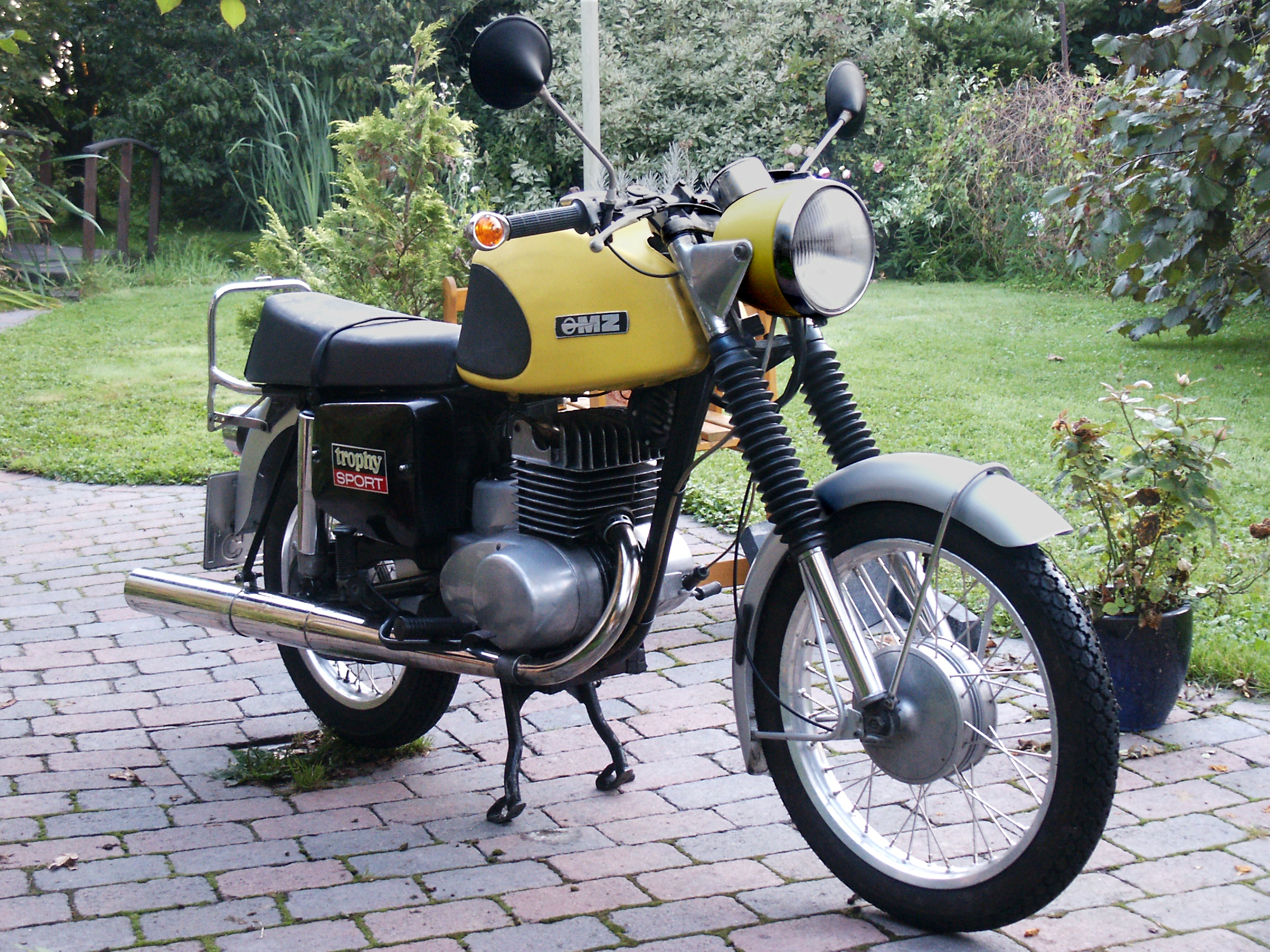
- MZ ETS 250 Trophy Sport
- Manufacturer: VEB Motorradwerk Zschopau
- Production: 1968–1973
- Predecessor: MZ ES 250/2
- Successor: MZ TS 250
- Engine: → see table
- Related: MZ ETS 125/150

The MZ ETS 250 motorcycles were manufactured at the VEB Motorradwerk Zschopau from 1968 to 1973. Following international development trends away from swingarm chassis and toward models with telescopic forks, a motorcycle model based on the MZ ES 250/2 was developed. Other development goals included a fuel tank for at least 18 liters and sporty, narrow fenders. The MZ ETS 250 was produced alongside the ES 250/2, which was almost identical except for the front end. The ETS series was supplemented in 1969 by the ETS 125 and ETS 150. The abbreviation ETS in the model name stood for Einzylinder, Teleskopgabel, Schwinge (english: Single cylinder, Telescopic fork, Swingarm).

On June 21, 1970, the 1,000,000th motorcycle since 1950 rolled off the production line in Zschopau: an MZ ETS 250 Trophy Sport.

== History and Technical details ==
Many parts of the ES models were adopted unchanged for the construction of the new motorcycles. The frame of the ES was modified only slightly: the rigid headlight mount, the steering stop, and the mounting points for individual seats were omitted. The mount for the handlebar lock had to be modified accordingly, and the headlight was mounted on the telescopic fork. It initially had a symmetrical low beam, a diameter of 160 mm, and was equipped with a 35/35 W dual-filament bulb. The speedometer sat quite raised on top of this headlight with a spacer sleeve. Unlike the ES models, the front wheel had a size of 18 inches.

The striking "buffalo tank," which defines the motorcycle's appearance and has a capacity of approximately 22 liters, was a new development. Large knee pads are attached to the sides. A lockable compartment for tools and small items is integrated into the end of the seat. The rear fender is shorter than on the ES, and the side panels have a different shape.

The piston-controlled two-stroke MM 250/2 engine was used for the drive. Its design was revised before the ES 250/2 went into series production, and its power was slightly increased. The increase in power was achieved by modifying the intake section between the carburetor and cylinder, changing the valve timing, and increasing the compression ratio. For selected export markets, the power was throttled to 17 hp.

As with all MZ models, starting with the RT 125/1, the secondary chain is fully encapsulated with the chain guard made of rubber hoses and the chain case made of Duroplast on the rear wheel hub.

The launch of the ETS 250 series resulted in one of the few recalls in East German vehicle manufacturing: Six weeks after the start of series production, sales and production had to be stopped. The reason was complaints indicating a tendency to crack the lower clamping head of the telescopic fork. As a result, a different casting process was used, which had already been used on pre-production machines, so the defect was not detected during testing. The clamping head was replaced on all machines delivered up to that point.

== Facelift ==
Over the course of its production run, the MZ ETS 250 underwent continuous exterior and technical modifications. Starting in 1970, a significantly improved headlight with an asymmetrical low beam, 170 mm light output, and 40/45 W power was used. MZ had already requested this at the start of series production, but it could not be provided by the supplier industry in 1969.

Initially, only the color combination black/red was available. Starting in June 1971, the decorative lines on the side covers were removed, the "Trophy Sport" lettering was replaced with stickers, the fenders were painted silver, the tank and headlights were painted red or yellow, and the shock absorber sleeves were removed. Decorative elements ("crescents") were added above and below the MZ lettering on the tank.

== Reception ==
The magazines Kraftfahrzeugtechnik and Der deutsche Straßenverkehr tested an ETS 250 over 7,000 kilometers. The driving stability and straight-line stability were praised as being better than a model with a front swing arm. However, the footrests should have been positioned further back, in keeping with the sporty design. The quality of the rear tire, on which lugs had broken out, was criticized. The braking effect on the test bike was rated as needing improvement, as it was not smooth. The engine performance received a good rating, but a stiff clutch was criticized. Furthermore, a five-speed transmission was desired for the 250 cc displacement class. The headlight was considered a step backward, as it did not offer asymmetrical low beam compared to the ES, and the light output also left much to be desired. The design of the motorcycle was considered successful and contemporary. Improvements were made to the front fender and the upper clamping head on the telescopic fork.

In the international press, the ETS 250 received excellent reviews from numerous magazines. The powerful yet reliable engine, the braking performance, the enclosed chain, the good ride comfort (even for the passenger), and the excellent handling were all praised. Some criticism was directed at the gearshift (comfort, noise). The Pneumant tires were unanimously and harshly criticized, and according to the French magazine "Moto Revue," they even hold the record for poor grip on wet roads.

== Specifications ==
ETS 250
Production	1968–1973
Engine	airstream-cooled single cylinder Two-stroke engine, Kick start
Design	piston-controlled inlet port
Bore × Stroke	69 mm × 65 mm (2.7 in × 2.6 in)
Displacement	246 cc (15.0 cu in)
Compression ratio	9 : 1
Power rating	19 PS (14 kW) at 5300/min
max. Torque	25.5 N⋅m (18.8 lbf⋅ft) at 4700/min
Introduction of fuel	BVF-carburetor, intake diameter 28.5 mm (1.12 in)
Lubrication	total-loss lubrication system, fuel-to-oil ratio 33 : 1
Ignition system	battery ignition, contact-controlled
Alternator	DC dynamo generator, 6 V – 60−90 W
Battery	6 V – 12 Ah
On-board voltage	6 V
Clutch	multi-disk clutch in oil bath, mechanically operated
Transmission	4-speed helical gearbox, claw-switched; chain drive (fully encapsulated)
Frame	single cradle steel frame
Dimension (L × W × H)	2,200 mm × 610 mm × 1,030 mm (87 in × 24 in × 41 in)
Wheelbase	1,380 mm (54 in)
Front suspension	telescopic fork, hydraulically damped, not adjustable, suspension 145 mm (5.7 in)
Rear suspension	swingarm, 2 struts, suspension 105 mm (4.1 in), adjustable spring base
Front rim size	wire-spoke wheel, 1.85 × 18″
Rear rim size	wire-spoke wheel, 2.15 × 16″
Front tire	3.25-18 M/C 55P TT
Rear tire	3.50-16 M/C 58P TT
Front brake	simplex drum brake, diameter 160 mm (6.3 in), bowden cable operated
Rear brake	simplex drum brake, diameter 160 mm (6.3 in), bowden cable operated
Curb weight	151 kg (333 lb)
Maximum load	320 kg (710 lb)
Fuel capacity	22 l (reserve 1.5 l)
Top speed	130 km/h (81 mph)

== Number of units ==
Production of the pilot series began in 1968, with large-scale production beginning the following year.

units per year and total
model	year						total
model	1968	1969	1970	1971	1972	1973	total
ETS 250	21	2739	4501	3698	4250	1013	16.222

Of the 16,222 ETS 250s produced, the majority (12,723) were sold in the GDR. The breakdown for export markets is as follows.

Stückzahl	Nation
1.517	Germany
649	France
634	United Kingdom
182	Denmark
102	Iraq
64	Australia
62	Yugoslavia
61	Netherlands
50	Iran
47	Yemen

Stückzahl	Nation
26	Greece
25	Soviet Union
18	Norway
13	Portugal
9	Colombia
8	Hungary
7	Switzerland
6	Cyprus
4	United States
3	Bulgaria

Stückzahl	Nation
2	Cuba
2	Panama
1	Finland
1	Poland
1	Ghana
1	Tanzania
1	Czechoslovakia
1	Romania
1	Sweden
1	Syria

== Further information ==
=== Special model ETS Eskort ===
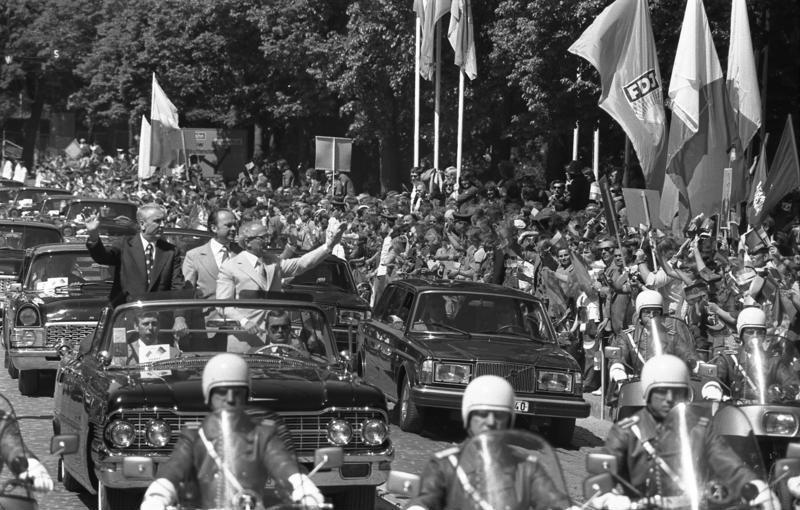
Motorcycle escort with MZ ETS Eskort during a state visit to the GDR (1977)

The custom-built MZ ETS Eskort was intended for state visits. It was commissioned by the Ministerium für Staatssicherheit in the early 1970s and produced in a limited edition of 60 (30 in 1973 and 30 in 1975). 30 were delivered to the state services, and another 30 were exported to the Hungarian People's Republic.

Unlike the production model, the Eskort was equipped with the 5-speed transmission derived from off-road sports bikes. A full front fairing, the rectangular headlights of the Wartburg 353, and Wartburg rearview mirrors are the Eskort's distinctive features. The top speed is stated as 120 km/h (75 mph). The unladen weight is approximately 160 kilograms.

=== Model ETS 175 ===
According to research by enthusiasts based on statistics from VEB MZ, a variant of the series with a 172 cc displacement (apparently with the engine of the ES 175/2 produced at the same time) was also unofficially produced in 1969 and 1970. Of only 113 ETS 175s delivered, 100 were exported to Thailand, seven to the People's Republic of Poland, and one to Czechoslovakia. Five remained in the GDR.
