= MZ ETS 125/150 =

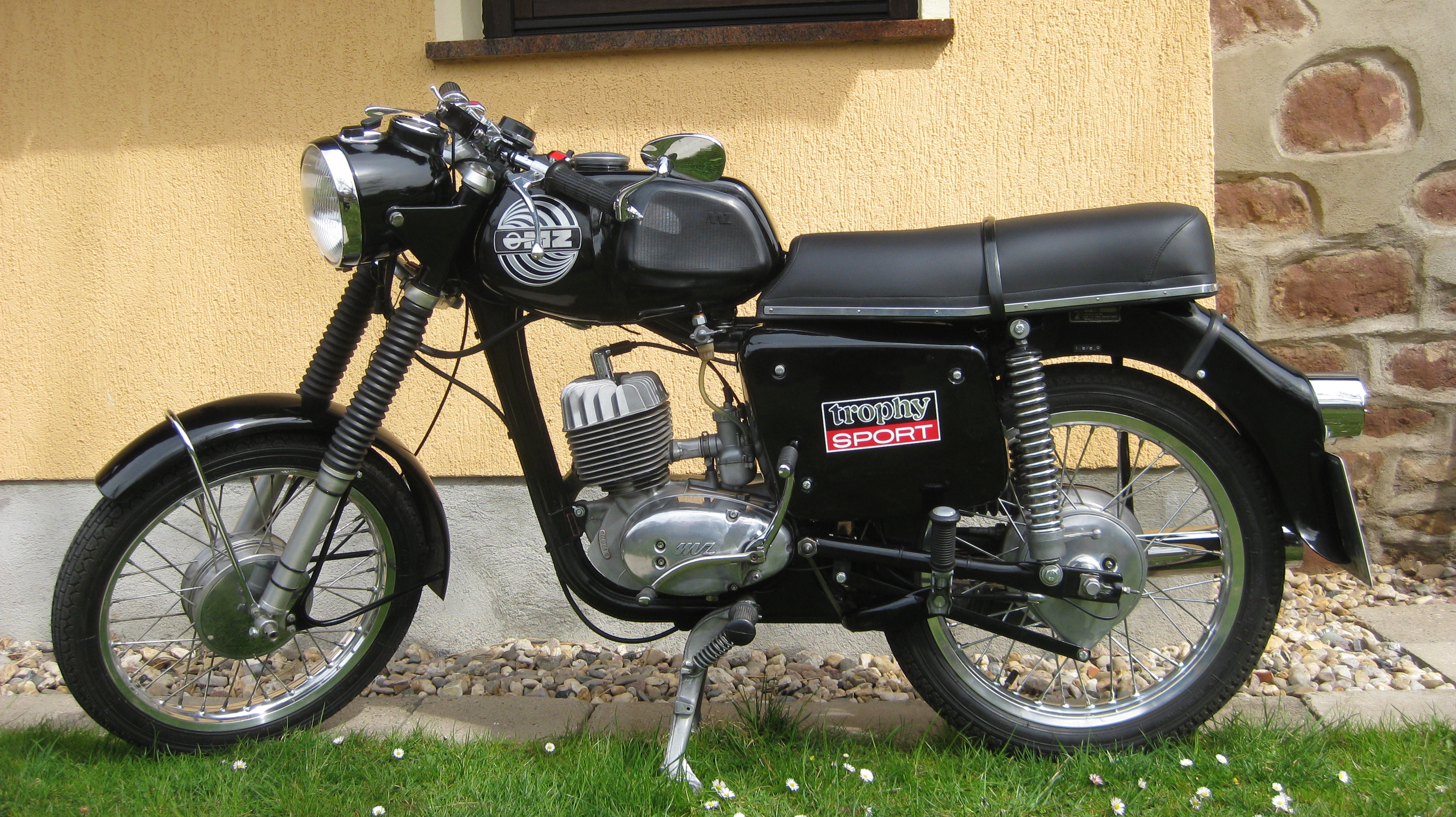
- MZ ETS 150 (without necessary blinkers)
- Manufacturer: VEB Motorradwerk Zschopau
- Production: 1969–1973
- Predecessor: MZ ES 125/150
- Successor: MZ TS 125/150
- Engine: → see table
- Related: MZ ETS 250

The motorcycles MZ ETS 125 and MZ ETS 150 were built at the VEB Motorradwerk Zschopau between 1969 and 1973. In the course of international development trends away from the full swingarm chassis towards models with telescopic forks, such a system was developed based on the motorcycle models MZ ES 125/150/1. Further development goals were: a co-steering headlight, variable handlebar design and a sporty look. The ETS 125 and ETS 150 were produced parallel to the ES models, from which they differed almost only in the front end.

The highly visible technical features are reflected in the abbreviation ETS which stood for Einzylinder, Teleskopgabel, Schwinge (english: Single cylinder, Telescopic fork, Swingarm).

== Technical details ==
To develop the ETS, most of the components of the ES models were adopted unchanged. The frame of the ES only needed to be changed slightly. The headlight mount and the steering stop were omitted. The mount for the handlebar lock had to be modified accordingly. As the dimensions of the steering head were the same, the entire front section could be adopted from the ETS 250, which had been introduced a year earlier, except for modified compression springs on the telescopic fork. The seat was new. The 9-liter fuel tank of the Simson Sperber, which had been built from 1966, was used for the small ETS models. Only the frame fastenings had to be adapted to the dimensions of the frame and the MZ lettering and knee pads were attached. The ETS was equipped with either flat or high handlebars.

== Facelift ==
Over the course of their production life, external and technical changes were continually made.

From August 1970, the models were given a tilt stand with a tension spring. The models from June 1971 received a new finish: no decorative lines on all parts, stickers on the side covers, fenders in silver, tank and headlights in red or yellow. In addition, there were dynamic decorative elements ("crescents") above and below the MZ lettering on the tank. In 1973, the headlight fastening was changed.

== Receptions ==
The magazine Kraftfahrzeugtechnik extensively tested an ETS 150: The driving performance, in particular driving stability and straight-line stability (compared to a model with a front swingarm) and braking effect of the front brake were rated as very good. The engine power and elasticity with a favorable torque curve were highlighted. In view of the engine knocking at full load, suggestions were made for improvements with regard to the shape and number of the ports and a larger cooling fin surface was suggested. Not only for the ETS, but also for the MZ engines in this displacement class (125 cc to 150 cc), a five-speed gearbox and an elastic engine fastening in the frame were desired for better power transmission. After the primary chain of the test machine broke, the supplier was criticized for a known lack of quality and pointed out the associated high safety risk for the driver.

The design of the motorcycle was considered to be very successful, although improvements in the finish (color combinations and quality) were desired. The appearance of the fuel tank was also highlighted positively, but a larger capacity for a longer range was suggested.

In the international press, the ETS 125/150 received very good reviews from many magazines. The powerful yet reliable engine, the braking effect and the internal brake hub, the quick release axles, the headlight, the encapsulated chain, the good ride comfort for the pillion passenger and the good handling were all praised. The English magazine Moto Cyclist Illustrated described the ETS 150 as a "motorcycle of outstanding and exceptional quality." There was some criticism of the position of the kickstarter. The Pneumant tires were unanimously and sharply criticized, and according to the French Moto Revue they even hold the record for poor grip on wet roads.

== Specifications ==
	ETS 125	ETS 150
Production	1969–1973	
Engine	airstream-cooled single cylinder Two-stroke engine, Kick start	
Design	piston-controlled inlet port	
Bore × Stroke	52 mm × 58 mm (2.0 in × 2.3 in)	56 mm × 58 mm (2.2 in × 2.3 in)
Displacement	123 cc (7.5 cu in)	143 cc (8.7 cu in)
Compression ratio	9 : 1	
Power rating	10 PS (7.4 kW) at 6300/min	11.5 PS (8.5 kW) at 6000/min
max. Torque	12.3 N⋅m (9.1 lbf⋅ft) at 5500/min	14.7 N⋅m (10.8 lbf⋅ft) at 5000/min
Introduction of fuel	BVF-carburetor, intake diameter 22 mm (0.87 in)	BVF-carburetor, intake diameter 24 mm (0.94 in)
Lubrication	total-loss lubrication system, fuel-to-oil ratio 33 : 1	
Ignition system	battery ignition, contact-controlled	
Alternator	DC dynamo generator, 6 V – 60–90 W	
Battery	6 V – 12 Ah	
On-board voltage	6 V	
Clutch	multi-disk clutch in oil bath, mechanically operated	
Transmission	4-speed helical gearbox, claw-switched; chain drive (fully encapsulated)	
Frame	pressed steel frame	
Dimension (L × W × H)	2,025 mm × 730 mm × 1,110 mm (79.7 in × 28.7 in × 43.7 in) with high handlebar; 2,025 mm × 610 mm × 1,030 mm (79.7 in × 24.0 in × 40.6 in) with flat handlebar	
Wheelbase	1,305 mm (51.4 in)	
Front suspension	telescopic fork, hydraulically damped, suspension 145 mm (5.7 in)	
Rear suspension	swingarm, 2 struts, suspension 100 mm (3.9 in), adjustable spring base	
Front rim size	wire-spoke wheel, 1.6 x 18″	
Rear rim size	wire-spoke wheel, 1.85 x 18″	
Front tire	2.75–18 M/C 48P TT	
Rear tire	3.00–18 M/C 52S TT	
Front brake	simplex drum brake, diameter 160 mm (6.3 in), bowden cable operated	
Rear brake	simplex drum brake, diameter 150 mm (5.9 in), bowden cable operated	
Curb weight	117 kg (258 lb)	
Maximum load	270 kg (600 lb)	
Fuel capacity	9 l (Reserve: 1.5 l)	
Top speed	100 km/h (62 mph)	105 km/h (65 mph)

== Number of units ==
The number of ETS 125/150s produced was negligible compared to the ES 125/150, which was produced in parallel. At first, the ETS 125/150 was produced exclusively for export, From the end of 1970, it was also available in the GDR, for 2380 or 2530 DDM.

Number of units per year and total
Model version	Year					Total
Model version	1969	1970	1971	1972	1973	Total
ETS 125	562	952	1040	1527	783	4.864
ETS 150	1258	1412	2608	4022	4760	14.060
