= MZ TS 125/150 =

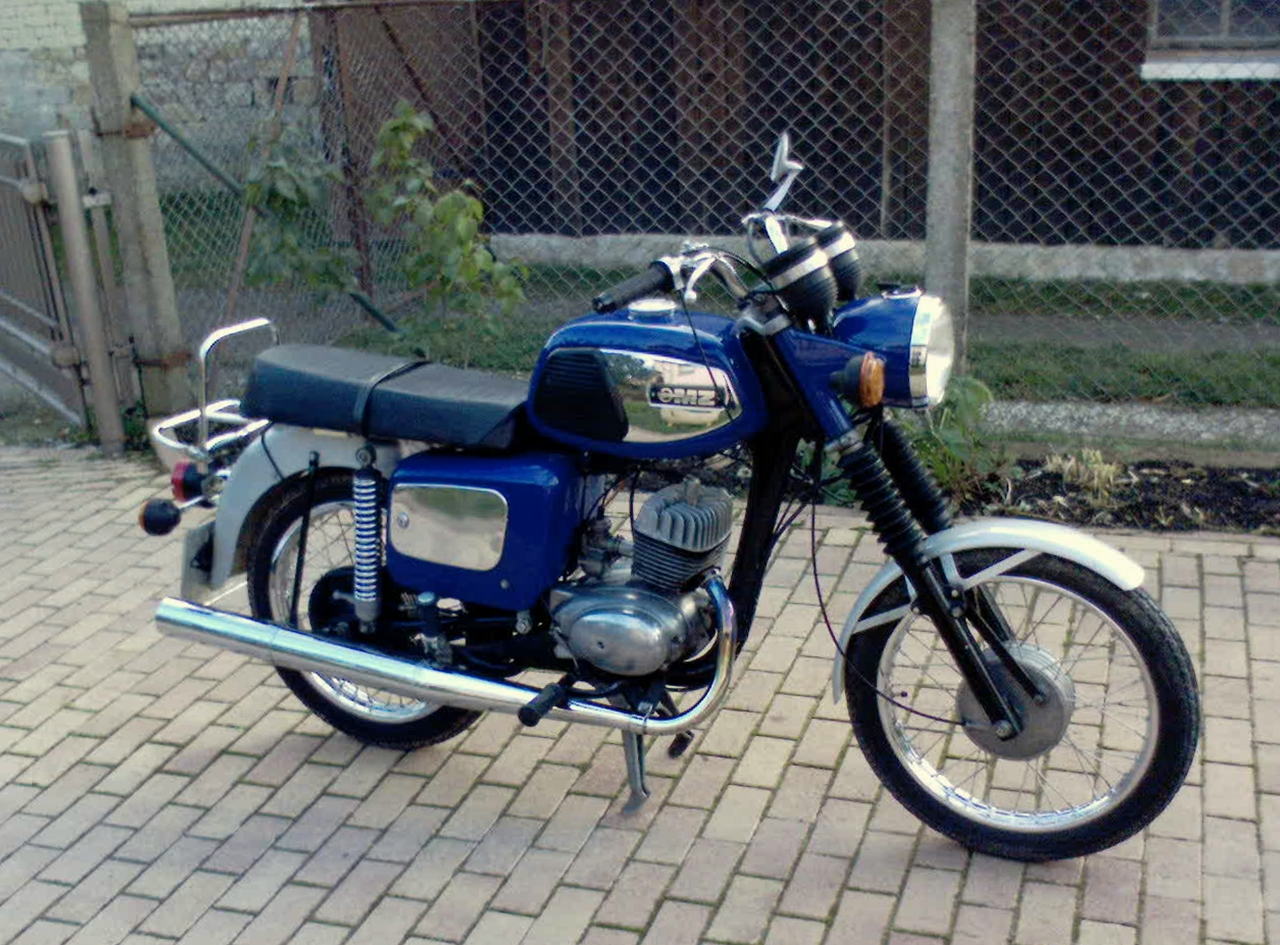
- MZ TS 150 de Luxe (built in 1979)
- Manufacturer: VEB Motorradwerk Zschopau
- Production: 1973–1985
- Predecessor: MZ ETS 125/150
- Successor: MZ ETZ 125/150
- Engine: → see table
- Related: MZ TS 250

The motorcycles MZ TS 125 and MZ TS 150 were built at the VEB Motorradwerk Zschopau between 1973 and 1985. The further development based on the ETS 125 and ETS 150 and was presented to the public for the first time at the Leipzig Autumn Fair in 1972. The series production began in June 1973.

The abbreviation TS in the model name stood for Teleskopgabel, Schwinge (English: Telescopic fork, Swingarm).

== Technical details ==
The manufacturer's aim was not a new development, but essentially a visual revision of the predecessor ETS 125/150 and an improvement in suspension comfort. The model received a longer suspension travel on the telescopic fork, a new fuel tank with a capacity of 12 l, the shape of which was based on that of the TS 250, and new side panels. The MM 125/150/2 two-stroke engines that had proven themselves in the ES and ETS models were used, and only the connecting rod bearing and crankshaft details were changed, which made the latter more stable. The previous single sleeve chain for the primary drive was replaced by a duplex chain. The parts of the electrical system were the same as on the TS 250: DC alternator with 60 W output, headlights with 170 mm diameter, asymmetrical dipped beam with 45/40 W dual-filament bulb and 21 W output on the back.

As with all MZ models, starting with the RT 125/1, the secondary chain is fully encapsulated with the chain guard made of rubber hoses and the chain case made of Duroplast on the rear wheel hub.

== Facelift ==
Over the course of the production period there were continuous external and technical changes.

From spring 1977, the TS was equipped with the improved MM 125/150/3 engine. Now the crankshaft disks and crankshaft stumps were made from one piece, and the stumps were larger in diameter. The crankshaft bearings were improved with radial ball bearings. The piston pin received a needle bearing. The fuel-oil mixture ratio could be reduced for these engines from 33 : 1 to 50 : 1. This made the small TS the last GDR vehicle on which the reduction in the oil proportion to 50 : 1 was implemented.

== Number of units ==
In the first years of production, the series was produced in parallel with the predecessor series ES 125/1 and ES 150/1 (1969–1977). A total of 163,409 (TS 125) and 326,052 machines (TS 150) were manufactured. 88% of the production of the TS 125 model was exported.

== Specifications ==
	TS 125	TS 150
Production	1973–1985	
Engine	airstream-cooled single cylinder Two-stroke engine, Kick start	
Design	piston-controlled inlet port	
Bore × Stroke	52 mm × 58 mm (2.0 in × 2.3 in)	56 mm × 58 mm (2.2 in × 2.3 in)
Displacement	123 cc (7.5 cu in)	143 cc (8.7 cu in)
Compression ratio	10 : 1	
Power rating	10 PS (7.4 kW) at 6300/min	11.5 PS (8.5 kW) at 6000/min
max. Torque	12.3 N⋅m (9.1 lbf⋅ft) at 5500/min	14.7 N⋅m (10.8 lbf⋅ft) at 5000/min
Introduction of fuel	BVF-carburetor, intake diameter 22 mm (0.87 in)	BVF-carburetor, intake diameter 24 mm (0.94 in)
Lubrication	total-loss lubrication system, fuel-to-oil ratio 33 : 1; from 1977: 50 : 1	
Ignition system	battery ignition, contact-controlled	
Alternator	DC dynamo generator, 6 V – 60–90 W	
Battery	6 V – 12 Ah	
On-board voltage	6 V	
Clutch	multi-disk clutch in oil bath, mechanically operated	
Transmission	4-speed helical gearbox, claw-switched; chain drive (fully encapsulated)	
Frame	pressed steel frame	
Dimension (L × W × H)	2,045 mm × 735 mm × 1,175 mm (80.5 in × 28.9 in × 46.3 in) with high handlebar; 2,045 mm × 620 mm × 1,115 mm (80.5 in × 24.4 in × 43.9 in) with flat handlebar	
Wheelbase	1,305 mm (51.4 in)	
Front suspension	telescopic fork, hydraulically damped, suspension 185 mm (7.3 in)	
Rear suspension	swingarm, 2 struts, suspension 105 mm (4.1 in), adjustable spring base	
Front rim size	wire-spoke wheel, 1.6 x 18″	
Rear rim size	wire-spoke wheel, 1.85 x 18″	
Front tire	2.75–18 M/C 48P TT	
Rear tire	3.00–18 M/C 52S TT	
Front brake	simplex drum brake, diameter 160 mm (6.3 in), bowden cable operated	
Rear brake	simplex drum brake, diameter 150 mm (5.9 in), bowden cable operated	
Curb weight	113 kg (249 lb)	115 kg (254 lb)
Maximum load	270 kg (600 lb)	
Fuel capacity	12,5 l (Reserve: 1.5 l)	
Top speed	100 km/h (62 mph)	105 km/h (65 mph)

== Reception ==
The magazine Der deutsche Straßenverkehr tested a TS 150 in 1974. The acceleration, braking and suspension of the telescopic fork were rated positively. The engine performance at low speeds was criticized, as were the strong vibrations in the footrests and handlebars and the "shaking" speedometer needle due to a non-elastic engine suspension. Improvements were desired in the grip values of the tires when cornering or leaning.

In 1979, the magazine Kraftfahrzeugtechnik tested the TS 150, which had been improved since 1977, in the de Luxe version over a distance of 2500 kilometers. The seating position of the test machine with high handlebars was assessed positively. The wet grip of the tires was criticized. Although the performance, consumption and reliability were rated as good, the state of the art of the drive in this displacement class was judged very critically. Initially, an elastic engine suspension and a five-speed gearbox were suggested. However, since there had been no progress for a decade, a significant improvement could only be expected with a comprehensive redesign of the engine. The seating comfort and the workmanship (after 1500 kilometers, individual seams had torn) of the seat were also criticized. Furthermore, the use of a 12-volt electric system would be an improvement.

Also in 1979, Der deutsche Straßenverkehr tested a TS 150 de Luxe. The driving characteristics and performance as well as the seat comfort were rated positively. However, as with the test machine from Kraftfahrzeugtechnik, a seam in the seat cover tore. There was room for improvement in the unsatisfactory wet grip of the tires, the braking effect, the strongly noticeable engine vibrations and the difficult-to-operate steering lock. It was also said that the kidney-shaped rear-view mirror was "nostalgic" and impaired the visual impression.
