= DKW RT 125 (1949–1957) =

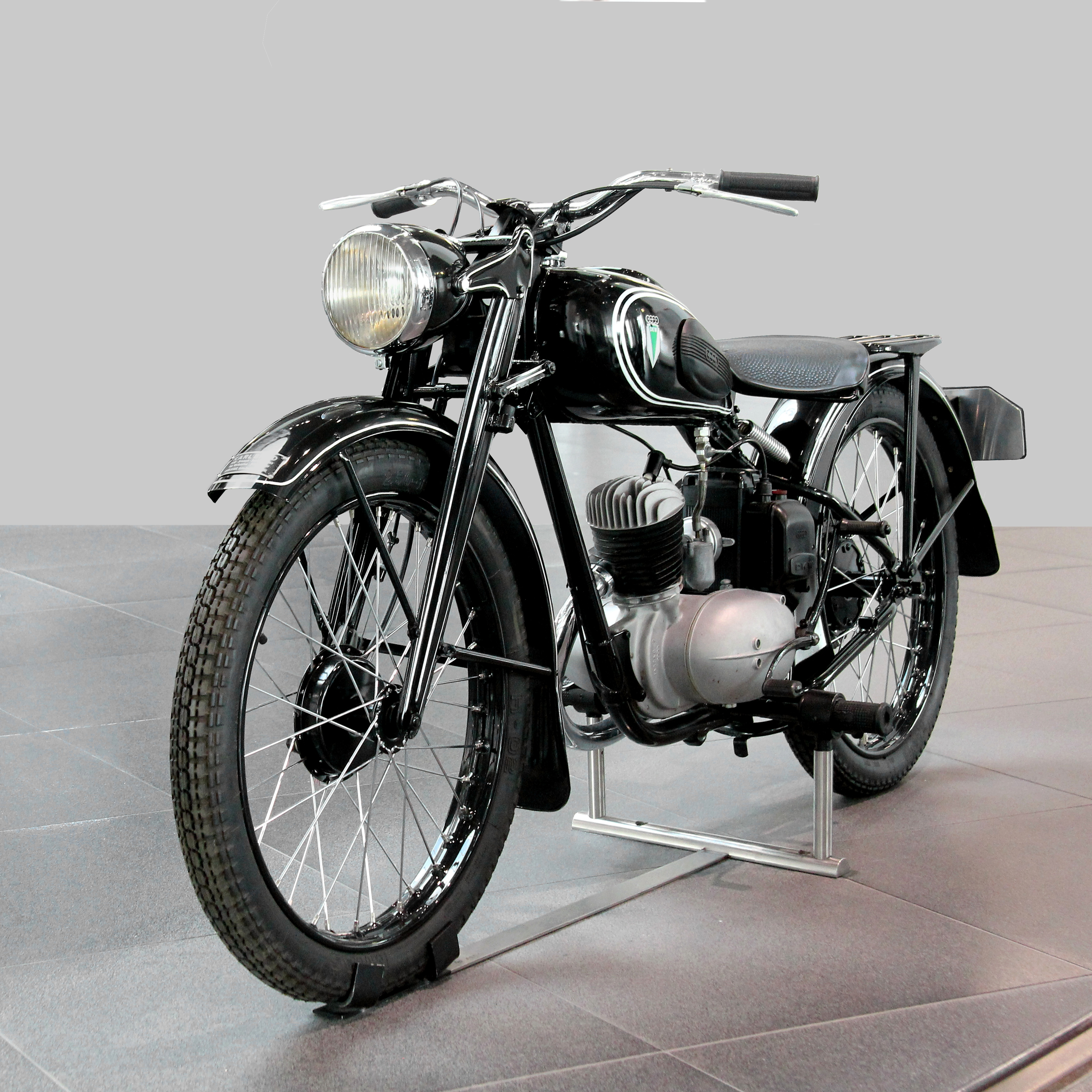
- Manufacturer: Auto Union GmbH
- Production: 1949−1957
- Engine: → see table

The DKW RT 125 is a motorcycle manufactured by Auto Union GmbH. The model is a replica of the DKW RT 125, which was built from 1940 to 1944. After the end of World War II, the design was no longer patented and was subsequently copied by various manufacturers in several countries.

Alongside other motorcycles of the DKW brand, the company in Ingolstadt produced three slightly different RT models with 125 cc engines. The abbreviation RT, in conjunction with the brand name DKW, stands for Reichstyp, referring to the successful pre-war models DKW RT 100 and RT 125, and simultaneously indicating the connection to the rest of Auto Union's motorcycle model range.

== History and model development ==
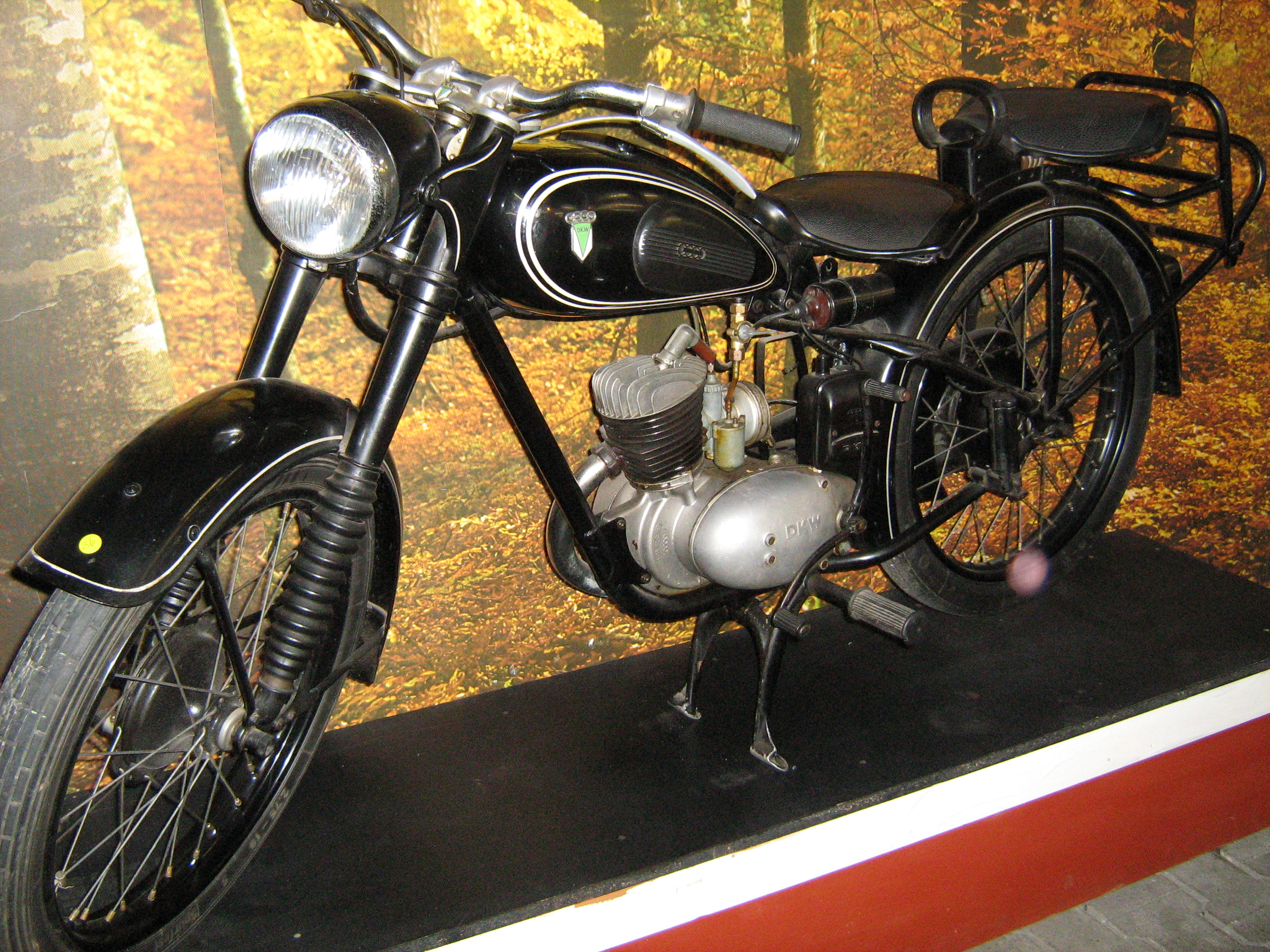
DKW RT 125/2 from 1952

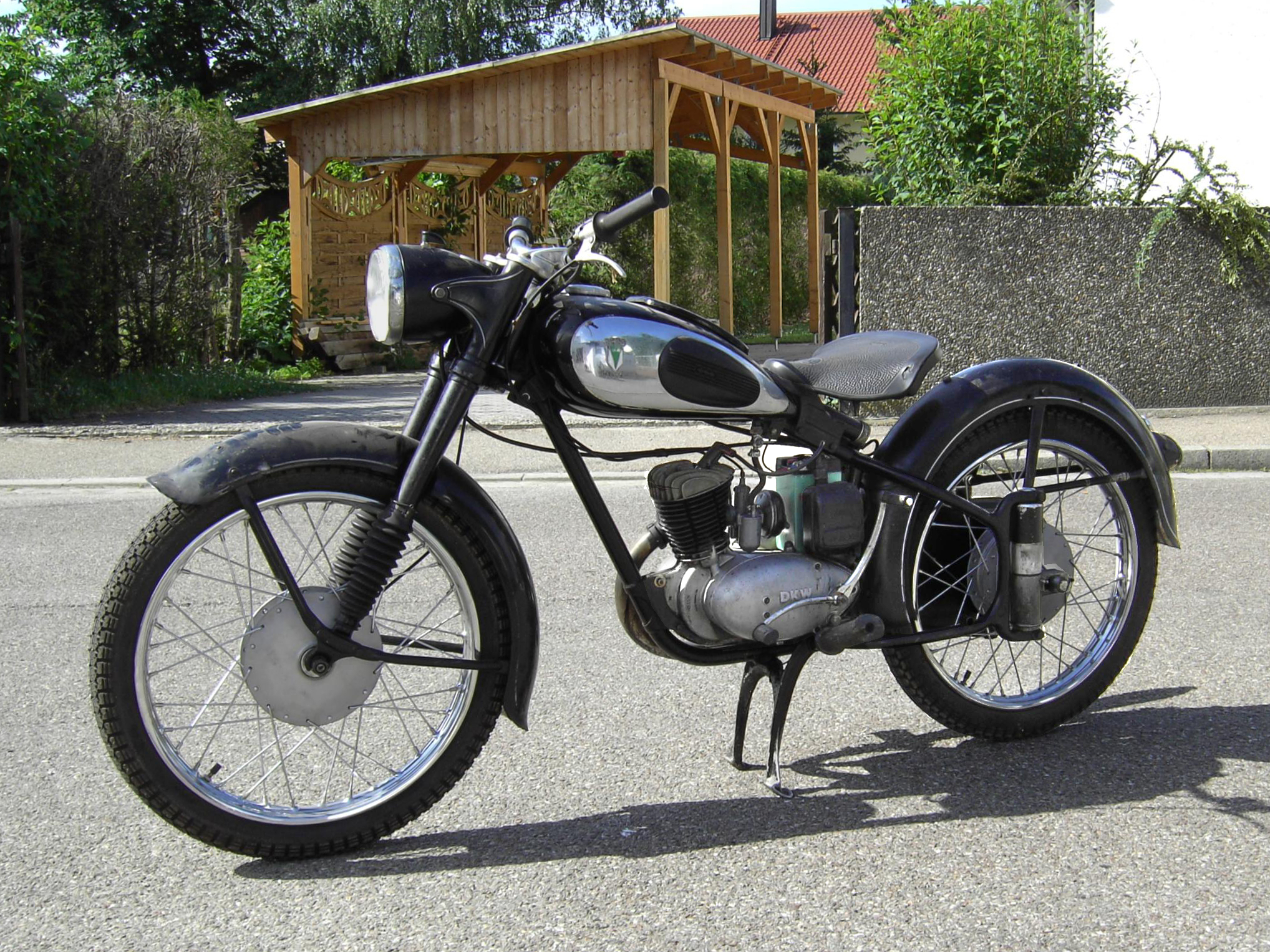
DKW RT 125/2H from 1956, unrestored

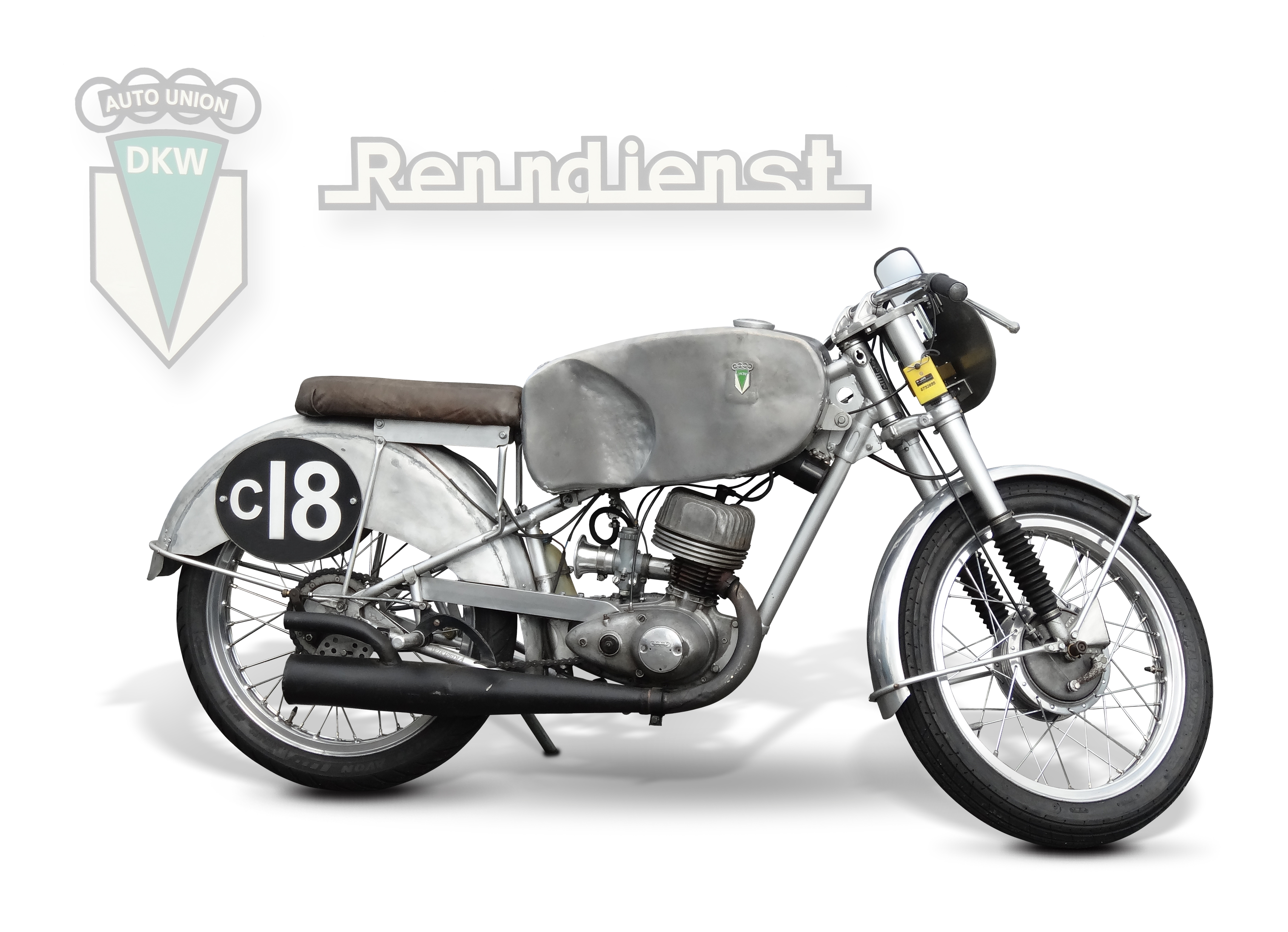
Rebuilt DKW RT 125 from 1951, used in historic racing (2013)

=== RT 125 W ===
At the newly founded Auto Union GmbH in Ingolstadt, series production of the replica, only slightly modified compared to the pre-war model, began in 1949. The prototypes of the model – which were shown in May 1949 at the export fair in Hanover together with the DKW Schnellaster under the later widely known slogan "DKW ist wieder da!" ("DKW is back!") – could only be produced through reverse engineering based on a pre-war engine provided in 1948 by the Regensburg Auto Union dealer Max Brod, as no construction drawings were available. The first motorcycle frames were initially sourced from Hoffmann-Werke Lintorf, before being manufactured in Ingolstadt itself a short time later.

The "W" in the model designation DKW RT 125 W stood for "West" to clearly distinguish it from the IFA-DKW RT 125, which was also manufactured in East Germany from 1949 onwards. While both models were very similar as replicas of the pre-war model, the IFA model, unlike the RT 125 W, was already equipped with rear suspension and quick-release axles.

To distinguish it from the pre-war model – and contrary to a widespread misconception – the chassis numbers began with 010 001. According to manufacturer's records, around 25,200 motorcycles with parallelogram forks were produced.

Compared to the pre-war model, the saddle suspension was changed, the speedometer was installed in the lamp housing, and the tool compartment was moved into the fuel tank. Until the end of 1950, the models still had parallelogram forks with rubber band suspension; from 1951 onwards, they featured hydraulically damped telescopic forks. This increased the unladen weight from an initial 73.5 kg to 83 kg (1952).

=== RT 125/2 (RT 125/2a) ===
The first model update took place in 1952. Initially, the models received a larger carburetor, increasing engine output to 5.7 hp (4.2 kW). The designation was initially RT 125/2a. Later that year, further changes were implemented, and the "a" was dropped from the designation. A modified chain guard and larger brake hubs were fitted. The speedometer drive was moved from the front to the rear wheel hub, the ignition switch was relocated from the battery box to the headlight housing, and the steering lock was moved from the right to the left side, so that when the handlebars were locked, the fuel filler cap, which was offset from the center, was also covered. The rear fender also received additional bracing. Optional extras included chrome-plated rims, a side-chromed fuel tank (previously black), and, for an additional 90.00 DM, a Jurisch rear suspension. In the latest versions of the RT 125/2, the power output was increased to 6.4 hp with a higher compression ratio (6.1 : 1) and a newly developed exhaust system. Despite the addition of rear suspension, the curb weight only increased slightly to 84 kg.

=== RT 125/H ===
As part of a further, and in retrospect final, model update, the models built from 1954 onwards received standard straight-line rear suspension with hydraulic damping and full-hub brakes with a 150 mm diameter. The designation "H" indicates the rear suspension (in german: "Hinterradfederung"). The engine with 6.4 hp was adopted from the 125/2. The compression ratio increased to 6.3 : 1 with a new cylinder head, and the top speed to 92 km/h.

== Specifications ==
	RT 125 W	RT 125/2 (RT 125/2a)	RT 125/H
Production	nov. 1949 to apr. 1952	may 1952 to oct. 1956	mar. 1954 to aug. 1957
Engine	airstream-cooled single cylinder Two-stroke engine, Kick start		
Design	piston-controlled inlet port		
Scavenging	Schnuerle porting		
Bore × Stroke	52 mm × 58 mm (2.0 in × 2.3 in)		
Displacement	123 cc (7.5 cu in)		
Compression ratio	5.9 : 1	6.1–6.3 : 1	
Power rating	4.75 PS (3.49 kW) at 5000/min	5.7 PS (4.2 kW) at 5400/min; later: 6.4 PS (4.7 kW) at 5600/min	6.4 PS (4.7 kW) at 5600/min
max. Torque		8.48 N⋅m (6.25 lbf⋅ft)	
Introduction of fuel	Bing-carburetor		
Lubrication	total-loss lubrication system, fuel-to-oil ratio 25 : 1		
Ignition system	battery ignition, contact-controlled		
Alternator	DC dynamo generator, 6 V – 35–45 W		
On-board voltage	6 V		
Clutch	multi-disk clutch in oil bath, mechanically operated		
Transmission	3-speed helical gearbox, claw-switched; chain drive		
Frame	single cradle steel frame		
Dimension (L × W × H)	1,985 mm × 655 mm × 880 mm (78.1 in × 25.8 in × 34.6 in)	1,980 mm × 660 mm × 880 mm (78 in × 26 in × 35 in)	1,950 mm × 660 mm × 880 mm (77 in × 26 in × 35 in)
Wheelbase	1,260 mm (50 in)	1,268 mm (49.9 in)	
Seat height	670 mm (26 in)	660 mm (26 in)	
Front suspension	up to chassis number 035 199: girder fork with rubber band suspension; from chassis number 035 200: telescopic fork	telescopic fork	
Rear suspension	rigid frame	rigid frame; as option: Jurisch-suspension	plunger
Front rim size	wire-spoke wheel, 1.5 x 19″	wire-spoke wheel, 2.0 x 19″	
Rear rim size	wire-spoke wheel, 1.5 x 19″	wire-spoke wheel, 2.0 x 19″	
Front tire	up to chassis number 040 090: 2.50–19″ from chassis number 040 091: 2.75–19″	2.75–19″	
Rear tire	up to chassis number 040 090: 2.50–19″ from chassis number 040 091: 2.75–19″	2.75–19″	
Front brake	simplex drum brake, diameter 125 mm (4.9 in), bowden cable operated	simplex drum brake, diameter 140 mm (5.5 in), bowden cable operated	simplex drum brake, diameter 150 mm (5.9 in), bowden cable operated
Rear brake	simplex drum brake, diameter 125 mm (4.9 in), bowden cable operated	simplex drum brake, diameter 140 mm (5.5 in), bowden cable operated	simplex drum brake, diameter 150 mm (5.9 in), bowden cable operated
Curb weight	with girder fork: 73.5 kg (162 lb); with telescopic fork: 83 kg (183 lb)	84 kg (185 lb)	
Maximum load	with girder fork: 224 kg (494 lb); with telescopic fork: 240 kg (530 lb)	234 kg (516 lb)	
Fuel capacity	9.5 l (reserve: 1.5 l)		
Top speed	76 km/h (47 mph)	83 km/h (52 mph); later: 92 km/h (57 mph)	92 km/h (57 mph)

== Sources ==
- Jörg Sprengelmeyer (2003), DKW Motorräder aus Ingolstadt 1949–1958 (in German), Lemgo: Johann Kleine Vennekate Verlag, ISBN 3-935517-04-1
