= MZ 125 =

IFA/MZ 125
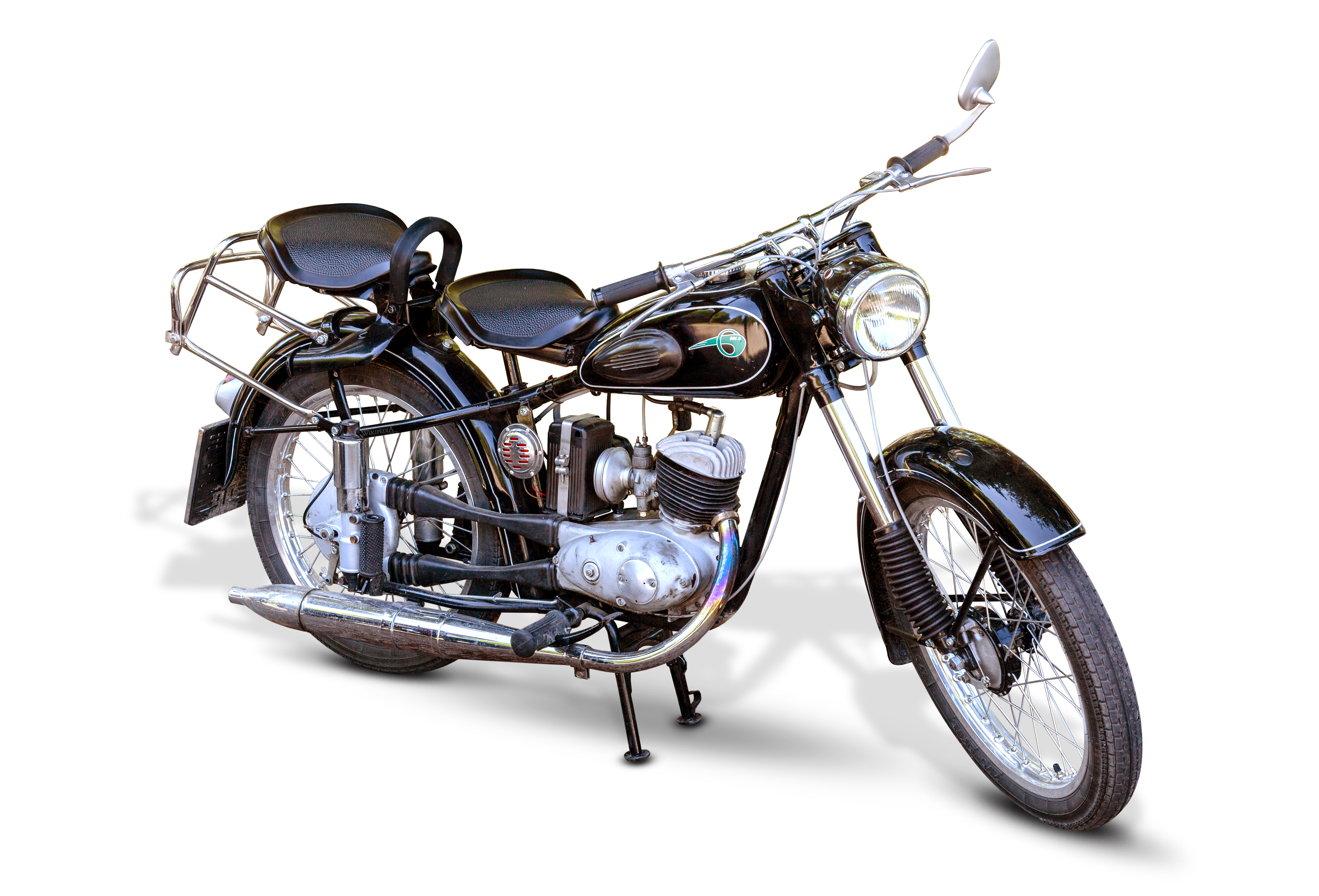
- Manufacturer: IFA-Motorradwerk Zschopau
- Production: 1949–1965
- Predecessor: DKW RT 125
- Successor: MZ ES 125/150
- Engine: → see table

The MZ 125 is a motorcycle manufactured by the IFA-Motorradwerk Zschopau (from October 21, 1953: VEB Motorradwerk Zschopau), which produced a total of 324,561 motorcycles in the IFA-DKW/IFA/MZ (RT) 125 series from 1950 to 1965. The model is a replica of the DKW RT 125 produced by Auto Union AG at the same location from 1940 to 1944 and whose design was no longer protected after the company was deleted from the commercial register in August 1948. The model name changed several times during its production period, most recently to MZ 125.

Between 2000 and 2008, the successor company to VEB MZ again built a motorcycle called the MZ RT 125.

== History ==
The modern production facilities of the DKW main plant in Zschopau were dismantled after the war and transported to Moscow as reparations, where the M1A "Moskva" was produced as a replica of the DKW RT 125. By order of the Soviet Military Administration in Germany (SMAD), the plant in Zschopau, located in the Soviet Occupation Zone, was renamed IFA DKW from July 1, 1946. IFA is the abbreviation for the Industrieverband Fahrzeugbau, which was newly founded on the same day. The first model produced by the Zschopau factory after the war was a further developed RT 125 from 1940, the IFA-DKW RT 125.

A light motorcycle, the DKW-Leichtmotorrad L60 had already been developed, but was not put into series production.

== Technical details ==
=== General ===
All model variants have an air-cooled two-stroke engine with a Schnürle reverse scavenging system and a flat-bottomed piston. The cylinder bore of 52 mm (2.0 in) and the piston stroke of 58 mm (2.3 in) result in a displacement of 123 cc (7.5 cu in). Depending on the model, the engine has an output of 4.75 to 6.5 hp. The engine block and cylinder head are made of an aluminum alloy; the cylinder is made of gray cast iron. The engine, mounted in a closed monotube frame, has a voltage-regulated 6-volt alternator and a carburetor with a float and needle valve. A chain is used for the primary drive from the crankshaft to the gearbox and the secondary drive to the rear wheel. The gearbox with foot shift has three or four gears, depending on the year of manufacture. The engine is lubricated by a mixture with a two-stroke fuel-to-oil ratio of 25 : 1 to 33 : 1. The top speed of the RT 125 was 75 km/h (47 mph) to 85 km/h (53 mph) km/h, depending on the model.

=== IFA-DKW RT 125 ===
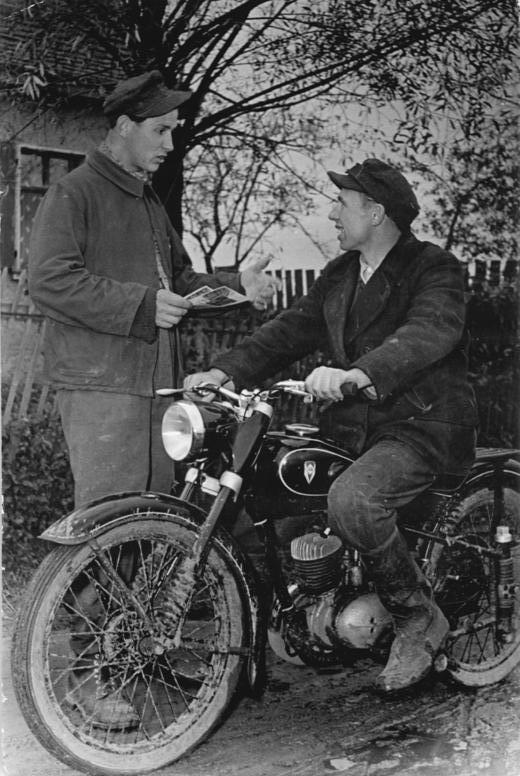
IFA RT 125/0 (1952)

The motorcycle, subsequently renamed RT 125/0 after the introduction of the RT 125/1, was first shown at the Leipzig Spring Fair in 1949. In contrast to the pre-war model and the first DKW RT 125 W built in Ingolstadt, it was already equipped with telescopic fork, rear wheel suspension, and quick-release axles. The tank, which had a recess for a tool compartment, held 8 liters of fuel. Test samples of this machine were manufactured in 1949 in Wilischthal, a few kilometers from Zschopau. Series production in Zschopau began in 1950, with only around 1,700 machines leaving the factory in the first year of production. From October 1, 1951, the company name DKW was no longer allowed to be used due to a ministerial directive, and the machine was then offered under the designation IFA RT 125, which had already been used in some cases previously. The RT 125/0 was put into series production without sufficient testing, which is why it still had some design defects such as an insufficiently durable chain, an immature telescopic fork and a clutch that tended to slip.

=== IFA RT 125/1 ===
In 1954, the extensively developed IFA RT 125/1 appeared. The considerable changes were not noticeable externally. The engine received, among other things, a redesigned cylinder and cylinder head, the connecting rod bearings of the IFA BK 350, and a new carburetor. Together with an increase in engine speed to 5200 rpm and several other modifications, this resulted in an increase in power to 5.5 hp. On the drive side, improvements were made to the transmission, clutch, and hubs, and above all to the power transmission to the rear wheel: the secondary chain was widened and encapsulated in innovative, patented rubber "chain tubes" and a chain case on the rear wheel hub, thus compensating for the previous problem of poor-quality and hard-to-find chains. Furthermore, the chain was subjected to considerable stress due to the straight-line suspension. It was not without reason that three of the first four GDR motorcycles (the AWO 425, EMW R 35, and IFA BK 350) had a cardan shaft. The principle of the secondary chain encapsulated in rubber tubes was later adopted by several other motorcycle manufacturers. Fraying of the encapsulation was delayed by guiding the chain between two rubber rails in the tube.

The chassis was also further developed. The frame joints were no longer welded, but rather socketed, soldered, and reinforced. The wheelbase was increased by 30 mm to improve seating conditions for pillion riders. The kickstand was replaced with a more stable, durable version. Among other things, a new telescopic fork with 150 mm of travel, the generously dimensioned rear suspension of the IFA BK 350, and a new saddle were used. The tank was redesigned to achieve a significantly larger capacity of 12 liters. The tool compartment was also eliminated.

=== MZ 125/2 ===
In 1953, the factory was renamed VEB Motorradwerk Zschopau, and from 1956 onwards, all models were called MZ. With the new name, the abbreviation RT was dropped from the motorcycle's official name (the popular name continued to be RT). From then on, it was simply called the 125/2 and was available in four colors (black, maroon, hammer-paint-green and -blue), with alloy rims and chrome fuel tank. For better heat dissipation and thus better braking deceleration, 1958 saw the introduction of full-hub brakes, derived from the then internationally successful RT racing models. In addition, the wheel guidance and spokes were improved.

=== MZ 125/3 ===
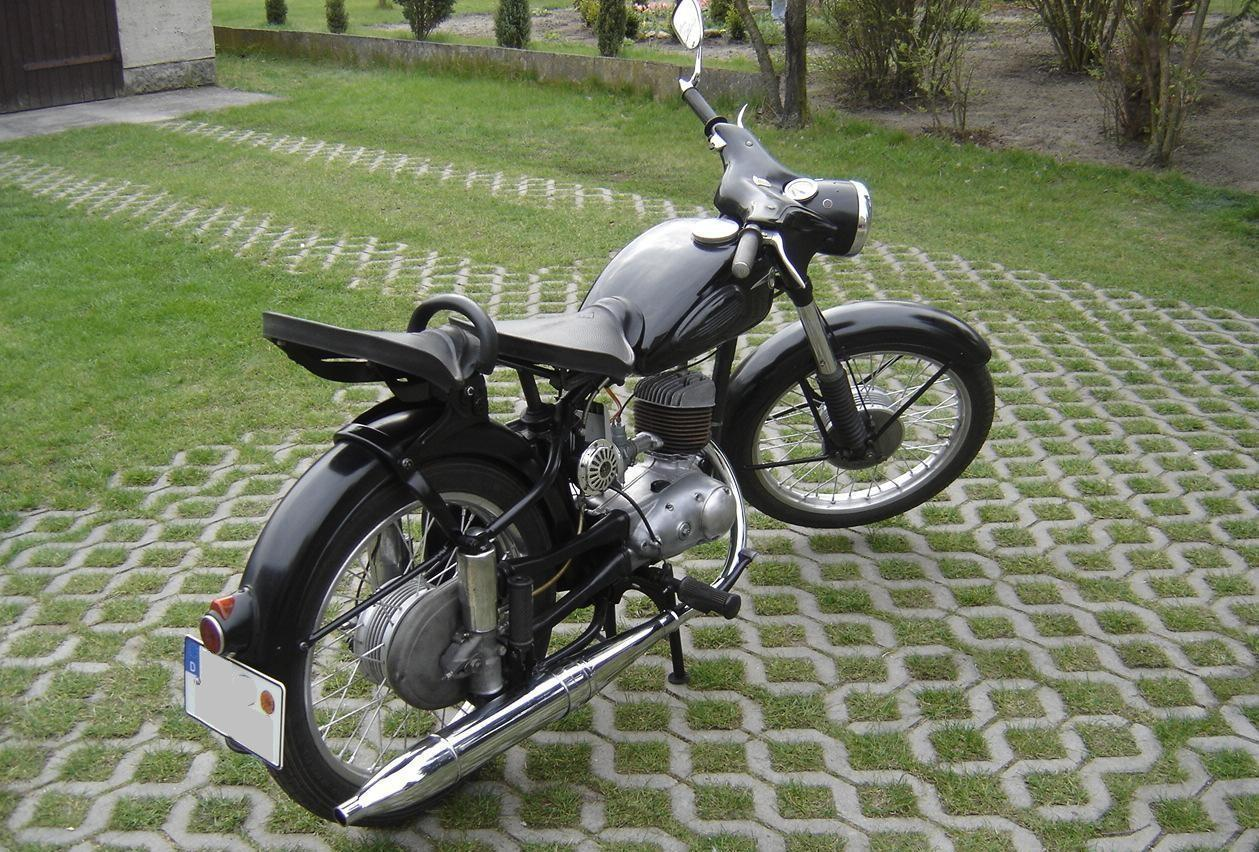
MZ 125/3, produced in 1961

The final development of the motorcycle, the MZ 125/3, appeared in 1959 with increased power to 6.5 hp and a four-speed gearbox. The motorcycle was now optionally available with a seat instead of the individual saddles. The machine is easily recognizable by the handlebar cover, from which only the grips protrude. The alternator was adopted from the MZ ES series, the toolbox was enlarged and now also accommodated the battery. The pillion seat, where present, was mounted lower. The rear tire was widened to 3.00 in. Annual output increased significantly, so that this model by far the most vehicles were built. From 1962, leg protection was also available as an accessory. In the same year, production was discontinued in favor of the MZ ES 125/150.

=== MZ 125/4 ===
To meet the demands of export customers, the RT continued to be built in small numbers (4,904) until 1965. Parts from surplus stocks and the engine from the ES 125 were used. There are few confirmed facts about the model. According to research by author and RT expert Claus Uhlmann, the official model designation was MZ 125/4. 1,600 machines were exported to Iran, 1,431 to Thailand. 500 machines originally ordered by Guinea are said to have been sold as export returns in the GDR, for which a new type approval was obtained from the Kraftfahrzeugtechnische Amt der DDR through the use of the ES engine.

== Specifications ==
	IFA-DKW RT 125	IFA RT 125/1	MZ 125/2	MZ 125/3	MZ 125/4
Production	1949–1954	1954–1956	1959–1959	1959–1962	1962–1965
Engine	airstream-cooled single cylinder Two-stroke engine, Kick start				
Design	piston-controlled inlet port				
Scavenging	Schnuerle porting				
Bore × Stroke	52 mm × 58 mm (2.0 in × 2.3 in)				
Displacement	123 cc (7.5 cu in)				
Compression ratio	6 : 1	6.5 : 1	7.25 : 1	8 : 1	9 : 1
Power rating	4.7 PS (3.5 kW) at 4800/min	5.5 PS (4.0 kW) at 5200/min	6 PS (4.4 kW) at 5200/min	6.5 PS (4.8 kW) at 5200/min	8.5 PS (6.3 kW) at 5800/min
max. Torque				9.3 N⋅m (6.9 lbf⋅ft) at 3600/min	12.3 N⋅m (9.1 lbf⋅ft) at 5500/min
Introduction of fuel	carburetor	carburetor (BVF NB 20)		carburetor (BVF NB 221–1)	carburetor (BVF 22 KNB 1–3)
Lubrication	total-loss lubrication system, fuel-to-oil ratio 25 : 1				33 : 1
Ignition system	battery ignition, contact-controlled				
Alternator	6 V – 35–40 W			6 V – 60 W	6 V – 60–90 W
Battery	6 V – 12 Ah				
On-board voltage	6 V				
Clutch	multi-disk clutch in oil bath, mechanically operated				
Transmission	3-speed helical gearbox, claw-switched; chain drive (fully encapsulated)			4-speed helical gearbox, claw-switched; chain drive (fully encapsulated)	
Frame	single cradle steel frame				
Dimension (L × W × H)	1,940 mm × 660 mm × 900 mm (76 in × 26 in × 35 in)	1,980 mm × 650 mm × 920 mm (78 in × 26 in × 36 in)		1,980 mm × 710 mm × 920 mm (78 in × 28 in × 36 in)	
Wheelbase	1,220 mm (48 in)	1,250 mm (49 in)		1,310 mm (52 in)	
Seat height		720 mm (28 in)		770 mm (30 in)	
Front suspension	telescopic fork, suspension 150 mm (5.9 in)				
Rear suspension	plunger, suspension 50 mm (2.0 in)				
Front rim size	wire-spoke wheel, 2.00 x 19″	wire-spoke wheel, 2.50 x 19″			
Rear rim size	wire-spoke wheel, 2.00 x 19″	wire-spoke wheel, 2.50 x 19″			
Front tire	2.50–19″	2.75–19″		2.75–19″	
Rear tire	2.50–19″	2.75–19″		3.00–19″	
Front brake	simplex drum brake, diameter 125 mm (4.9 in), bowden cable operated		simplex drum brake, diameter 125 mm (4.9 in), bowden cable operated; since 1958: diameter 150 mm (5.9 in)	simplex drum brake, diameter 125 mm (4.9 in), bowden cable operated	
Rear brake	simplex drum brake, diameter 125 mm (4.9 in), bowden cable operated		simplex drum brake, diameter 125 mm (4.9 in), bowden cable operated; since 1958: diameter 150 mm (5.9 in)	simplex drum brake, diameter 125 mm (4.9 in), bowden cable operated	
Curb weight	78 kg (172 lb)	88 kg (194 lb)	90 kg (200 lb)	109 kg (240 lb)	
Maximum load	208 kg (459 lb)	235 kg (518 lb)		250 kg (550 lb)	
Fuel capacity	8 l	12 l		11 l (reserve: 2 l)	
Top speed	75 km/h (47 mph)	80 km/h (50 mph)		85 km/h (53 mph)	

== Racing ==
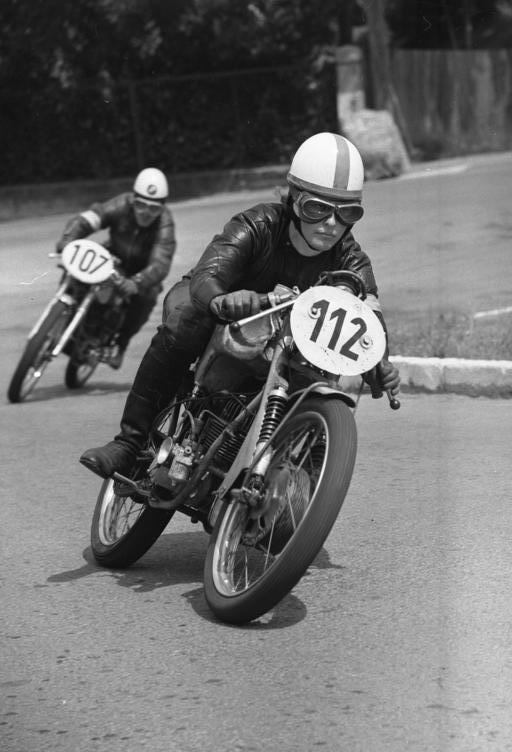
Helga Steudel at a race on the Schleizer Dreieck in 1963 on an RE 125

As late as 1949, engineer Kurt Kämpf, working in the MZ testing department, and former factory rider Hermann Scherzer from the RT developed a racing version, which was first used in July of that year at the "Stralsunder Bäderrennen" In 1950, a notable success was achieved with 3rd place in the German Road Championship in the class up to 125 cc on a racing RT.

To meet the specific requirements of road racing, the newly founded MZ Racing Department constructed a completely new chassis in 1952, and the machines were gradually further developed and their performance increased. These had nothing in common with the early RT racing versions.

== Further information ==
Equipped with an additional fan for better cooling, the RT 125 engine was also installed in the scooter models Pitty, Wiesel and Berlin built by Industriewerke Ludwigsfelde from 1955 onwards, the latter with an increased displacement of 150 cc. Many other parts of the RT were also adopted in the scooters. The subsequent model, the IWL Troll, received the engine of the MZ ES 150. Until 1985, all 125 and 150 cc MZ engines were based on the RT 125 engine. Only with the MZ ETZ 125/150 series was a completely new engine introduced; however, the bore/stroke ratio was retained here as well.

Between 1996 and 1998, the Zschopau-based company MZ-B marketed a motorcycle called the RT 125 Classic. The name "Classic" is misleading in that this model has nothing in common visually with the RT. Technically, it was based on the chassis of the MZ ETZ 251/301 and also used the fuel tank and side covers of this series.

From 2000 to 2008, the MZ Motorrad- und Zweiradwerk GmbH built a modern motorcycle with the traditional name MZ RT 125. It features a modern four-valve single-cylinder four-stroke engine with dual overhead camshaft (DOHC), and 124.4 cc displacement.

This motorcycle has nothing in common with the classic RT 125 except for the name.
