= Push start =

Method of starting a motor vehicle

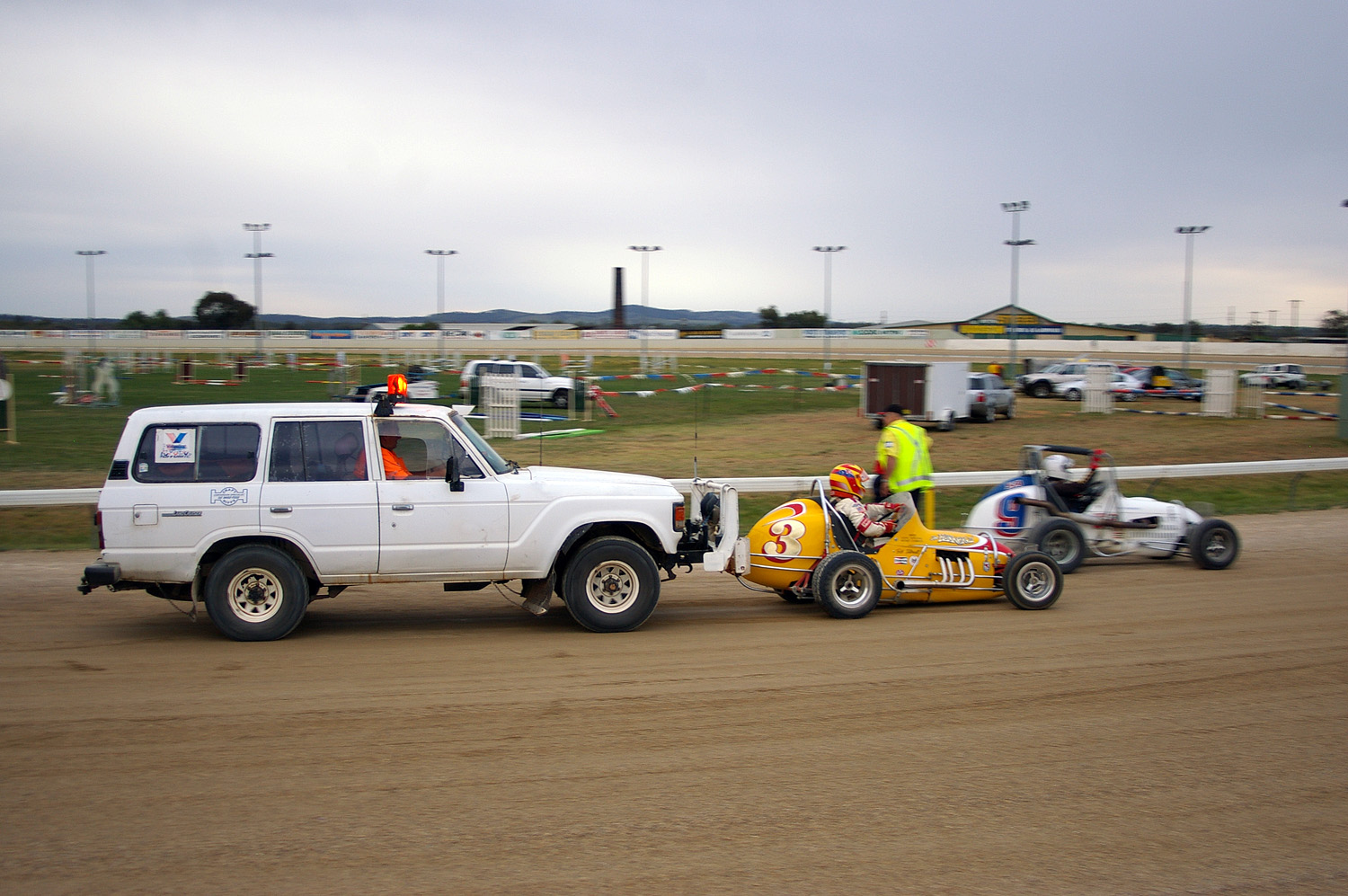
The Honker II, a midget racing car, getting a push start at the 144th Wagga Wagga Show.

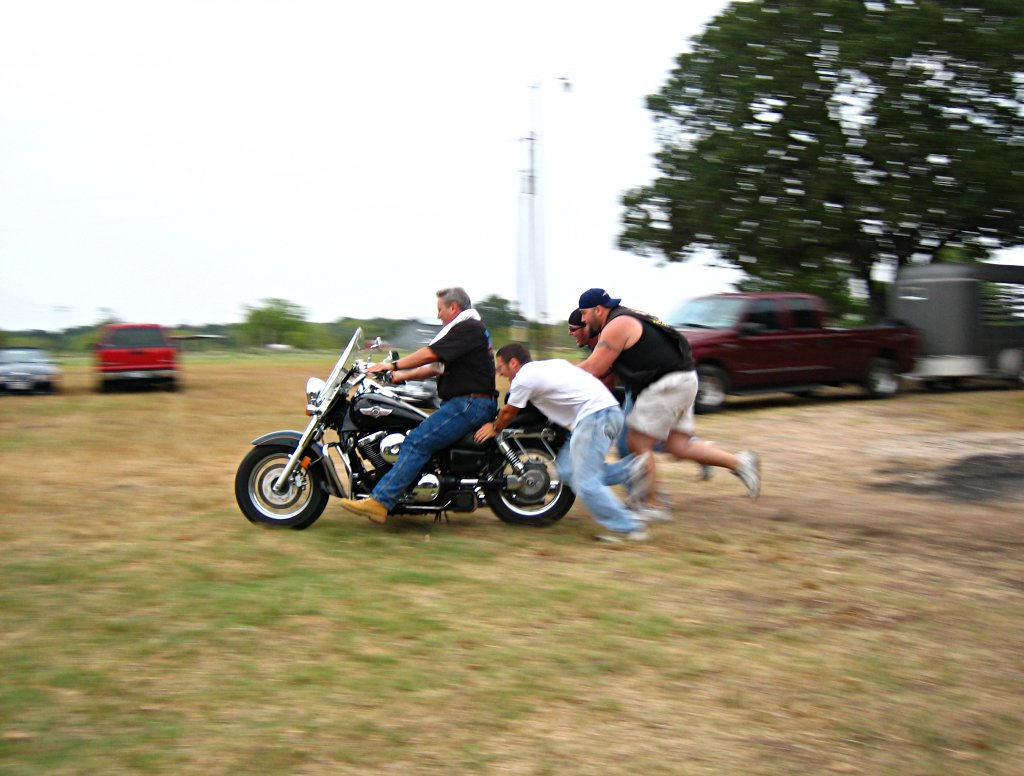
A group of people attempting to push start a motorcycle.

Push starting, also known as bump starting, roll starting, clutch starting, popping the clutch or crash starting, is a method of starting a motor vehicle with an internal combustion engine that has a manual transmission, a mechanical fuel pump, and a mechanically driven generator or alternator. By pushing or letting the vehicle roll downhill then engaging the clutch at the appropriate speed the engine will turn over and start. The technique is most commonly employed when other starting methods (automobile self starter, kick start, jump start etc.) are unavailable.

The most common way to push start a vehicle is to put the manual transmission in second gear, switching the ignition to on/run, depressing the clutch, and pushing the vehicle until it is at a speed of 5 to 10 mph (8 to 16 km/h) or more, then quickly engaging the clutch to make the engine rotate and start while keeping the gas pedal partially depressed, then quickly disengaging the clutch so it does not stall.

== Types ==
Push starting is most successful when the automobile is using a gasoline engine, uses a carburetor, and uses a capacitor discharge ignition (CDI) or an inductive discharge ignition system. Automobiles with other types of engine, ignition, and fuel delivery configurations may work, but may be more difficult to start. Some engines must have a battery providing some electricity since fuel injection systems must have power to operate.

=== Automatic or manual gearbox ===
A vehicle equipped with an automatic transmission (including semi-automatic (clutchless manual) transmissions) is difficult to push start since selection of transmission gears is possible only when the internals of such a gearbox are rotating. However, automatics with both front and rear hydraulic pumps can be push-started with no problems. The last American automobile with this type of transmission was the 1969 Chevrolet Corvair with a Powerglide automatic. While push-start can cause more damage to a hydrolocked engine, the starter motor is limited.

=== Petrol or diesel engines ===
A diesel engine uses heat and high compression (compression ratios commonly 16-23:1 versus 8-12:1 for gasoline) to ignite the fuel. When normally starting a modern diesel engine, it typically uses glowplugs to preheat the cylinder(s). If a battery is completely discharged then it may not provide the necessary power to heat the glowplugs, making the push starting of a diesel vehicle with a depleted battery almost impossible.

=== Fuel delivery systems ===
Fuel injection is most common for modern gasoline and diesel engines. Fuel injection needs electrical power to open and close the fuel injectors. If a battery is of a sufficiently discharged state that it cannot provide the power to turn an automobile self starter then it may also not be possible to activate the injectors. The most common method to start such a vehicle engine is to jump start it.

A fuel pump is used for fuel injection. It can be mechanically driven or electrically driven. If electrical then the same problem may arise which the battery cannot turn the pump because it is heavily discharged. A carburetor only needs suction from the internal combustion engine to work best when push starting. Once the engine is running, a fuel pump (mechanical or electrical) will continue to supply fuel to the carburetor.

Carburetor engines may damage the catalytic converter by fuel when cranked longer without igniting fuel or electrical controlling the carburetor.

=== Ignition systems ===
A modern gasoline engine contains an electronic ignition system which precisely times the electrical pulse to the spark plug. The advantage of such a device is that it can deliver a full power electrical pulse to the spark plugs even when the alternator is turning very slowly (as in push starting a motor). The outdated method of a mechanically timed ignition system is that it cannot deliver a full electrical pulse at very low engine revolutions per minute (RPM). This may affect the ease of push starting an engine to life.

=== History ===
In the early 20th century, many motorcycles could only be push started; the 1908 Scott was distinguished by introducing a kick starter feature. Excelsior Motor Company's Welbike, intended to be carried by paratroopers in World War II, was designed to be started only by push starting.
