= Kick start =

Method for starting a motorcycle or moped

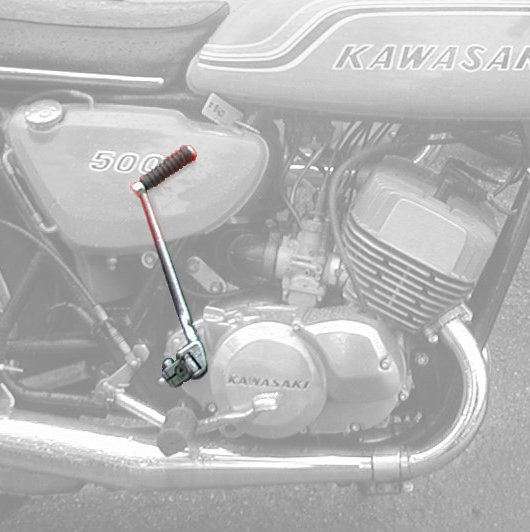
A kick start lever highlighted on a Kawasaki two-stroke motorcycle

Kick start (or "kickey") is a method of starting an internal combustion engine (usually that of a motorcycle) by pushing a ratcheting lever with the rider's foot. Kick start mechanisms were almost universally a part of motorcycle engines before the mid-1970s, and were phased out of production over the next twenty years or so as electric starters became standard equipment. There are still some motorcycles produced that have both kick and electric starters.

Many mopeds and scooters also carry both a kick start and an electric start, the former being useful in case the latter fails, as scooter and moped batteries tend to be smaller and, as a result, run down much faster than other forms of automotive batteries. Also, it is usually not possible to push start a moped or scooter with automatic transmission.

Larger motorcycles featured a manual compression release mechanism that made starting easier while modern units did this automatically through a cable attached to the kick start lever.

Today, dedicated off-road motorcycles and many ATVs use kick start systems, to avoid the weight of electric starters. The majority of the inexpensive two-wheelers and sometimes three-wheelers in developing countries, also use kick start systems.

== Operation ==
Before starting, kickstart levers are generally unfolded from the side of the motorcycle so that the rider can clear the side of the engine as it rotates. As the lever begins to descend under the rider's foot, the ratchet engages a gear linked to the crankshaft causing it to spin past top dead center so that an ignition spark can ignite the compressed fuel mixture. Upon starting, the ratchet disengages and the rider folds the lever back.

On some large displacement twins or singles, 'kickback' can occur if the fuel ignites before the piston reaches top dead center. This causes the crank to spin backwards and can be painful for the rider as the lever kicks back on their foot.

The first kick start motorcycle was a British Scott Motorcycle two-stroke twin manufactured in 1910.

Some scooters have kick starters with a tendency not to always work, if not performed correctly. Some manufacturers have also included kick starters in their models, only for a purpose of introducing apparent convenience for ignition, as opposed to offering a reliable alternative for an electric starter.

== See also ==
- Jump start
- Push start
