= Total-loss oiling system =

Engine lubrication system

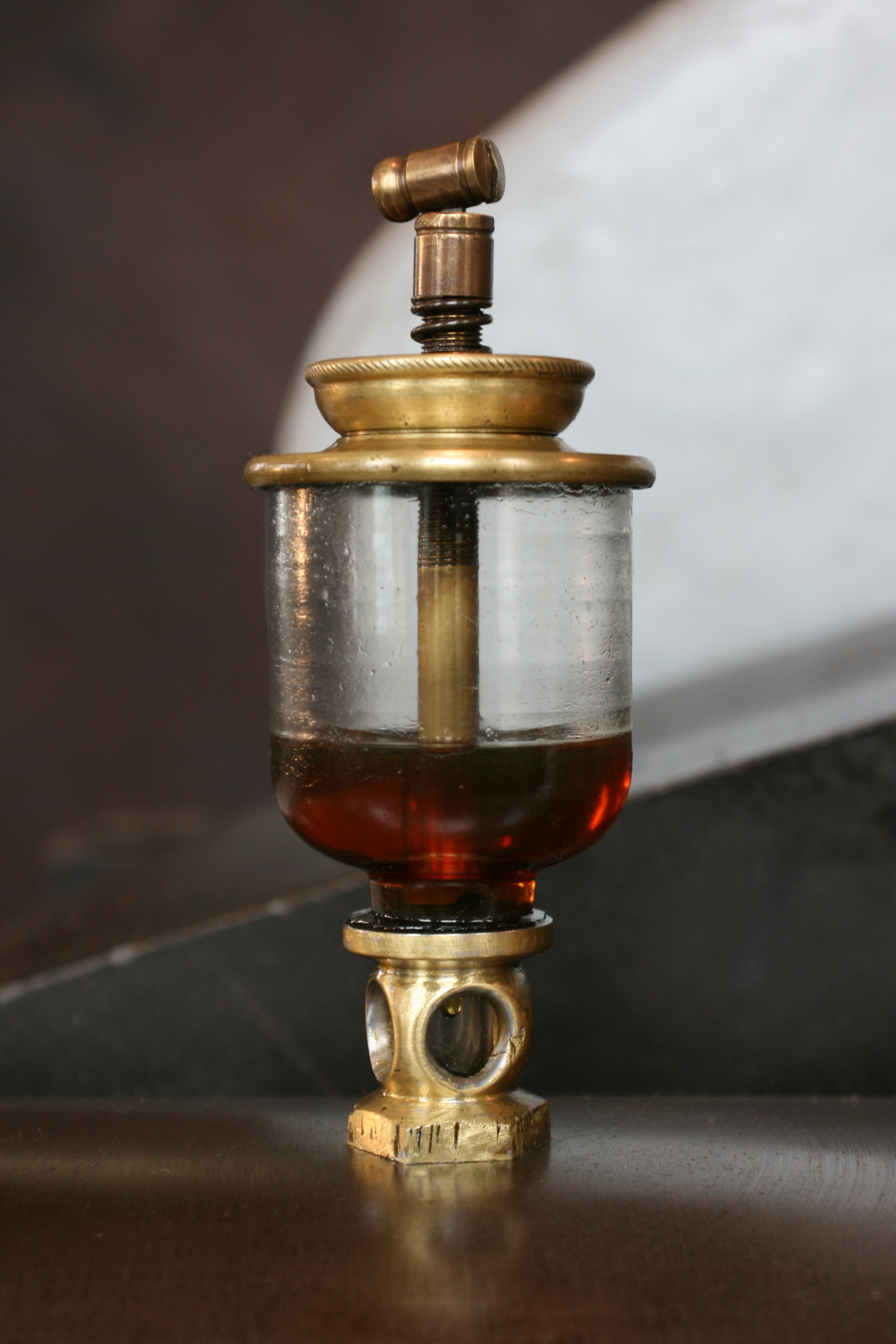
Sight-glass lubricator. A needle valve adjusts the rate of flow, which may be seen as drops passing through the window beneath the glass reservoir.

A total-loss oiling system is an engine lubrication system whereby oil is introduced into the engine and then either burned or ejected overboard. Now rare in four-stroke engines, total loss oiling is still used in many two-stroke engines.

== Steam engines ==
Steam engines used many separate oil boxes, dotted around the engine. Each one was filled before starting and often refilled during running. Where access was difficult, usually because the oil box was on a moving component, the oil box had to be large enough to contain enough oil for a long working shift. To control the flow rate of oil from the reservoir to the bearing, the oil would flow through an oil wick by capillary action rather than downwards under gravity.

On steamships that ran their engines for days at a time, some crew members would be "oilers", whose primary duty was to continuously monitor and maintain oil boxes.

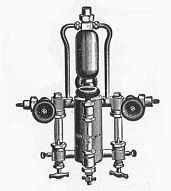
Displacement lubricator for adding oil to a steam supply

On steam locomotives, access would be impossible during running, so in some cases centralised mechanical lubricators were used. These devices comprised a large oil tank with a multiple-outlet pump that fed the engine's bearings through a pipe system. Lubrication of the engine's internal valves was done by adding oil to the steam supply, using a displacement lubricator.

== Oil recirculation ==
The first recirculating systems used a collection sump, but no pumped circulation, merely 'splash' lubrication, where the connecting rod dipped into the oil surface and splashed it around. These first appeared on high-speed steam engines. Later, splash lubrication engines added a 'dipper', a metal rod whose only function was to dip into the oil and spread it around.

As engines became faster and more powerful, the amount of oil required became so great that a total loss system would have been impractical, both technically and for cost.

Splash lubrication was also used on the first internal combustion engines. It persisted for some time, even in the first high-performance cars. One of Ettore Bugatti's first technical innovations was a minor improvement to the splash lubrication of crankshafts, helping to establish his reputation as an innovative engineer.

A more sophisticated form of splash lubrication, long used for rotating motor shafts rather than reciprocating engines, was the ring oiler.

== Pumped oil ==
Later systems collect oil in a sump, from where it can be collected and pumped around the engine again, usually after rudimentary filtering. This system has long been the norm for larger internal combustion engines.

A pumped oil system can use higher oil pressures and so makes the use of hydrostatic bearings easier. These gave a greater load capacity and soon became essential for small, lightweight engines such as in cars. It was this bearing design that saw the end of splash lubrication and total loss oiling. It disappeared from nearly all cars in the 1920s, although total loss continued in small low power stationary engines into the 1950s. Chevrolet used splash lubrication for their rod bearings until 1953, where it was phased out for the 235 'Six,' and then in 1954 when the 216 was eliminated from their line, and both the solid lifter and hydraulic lifter versions of the 235 had full-pressure lubrication.

== Two stroke engines and petroil mixtures ==
Many two-stroke engines, and most model engines, have a total-loss lubrication system. Lubricating oil is mixed with the fuel, either manually beforehand (the petroil method), or automatically via an oil pump. Prior to being burned in the combustion chamber, this air/fuel/oil mixture passes through the engine's crankcase, lubricating the moving parts as it does so. In order to reduce exhaust smoke, the Kawasaki H2 750 cc (46 cu in) 2-stroke triple motorcycle had a scavenge pump with a spring-loaded ball-valve under each crankcase to return surplus oil to the tank for reuse.

== Rotating-crankcase radial engines ==
Normally known by the term "rotary engine", the usually air-cooled radial configuration, rotating-crankcase Otto cycle engines were used by many "pioneer era" (1903–1914) aircraft and World War I combat aircraft. These engines were designed to have a total-loss lubrication system, with the motor oil held in a separate tank from the fuel in the vehicle, and not pre-mixed with it as with two-cycle engines, but mixed within the engine instead while running. Castor oil was often used because it lubricates well at the high temperatures found in air-cooled engines, and its tendency to gum is of little consequence in a total loss system, since it is constantly being replenished. Unburned castor oil in the exhaust was a cause of digestive complaints in many WWI airmen.

== Wankel engines ==
Wankel engines are internal combustion engines using an eccentric rotary design to convert pressure into rotating motion. These engines exhibit some features of both four-stroke and two-stroke engines. Lubrication is total loss, but there may be some variations. For instance, the MidWest AE series of Wankel aero-engines were not only both water-cooled and air-cooled, but also had a semi-total-loss lubrication system. Silkolene 2-stroke oil was directly injected into the inlet tracts and onto the main roller bearings. The oil that entered the combustion chamber lubricated the rotor tips and was then total-loss, but the oil that fed the bearings became a mist within the rotor-cooling air, and around 30% of that oil was recovered and returned to the remote oil tank.

== See also ==
- Wet sump
- Dry sump
