= Power rating =

Highest power input allowed to flow through electrical or mechanical equipment

In electrical engineering and mechanical engineering, the power rating of equipment is the highest power input allowed to flow through particular equipment. According to the particular discipline, the term power may refer to electrical or mechanical power. A power rating can also involve average and maximum power, which may vary depending on the kind of equipment and its application.

Power rating limits are usually set as a guideline by the manufacturers, protecting the equipment, and simplifying the design of larger systems, by providing a level of operation under which the equipment will not be damaged while allowing for a certain safety margin.

== Equipment types ==
=== Dissipative equipment ===
In equipment that primarily dissipates electric power or converts it into mechanical power, such as resistors, and speakers, the power rating given is usually the maximum power that can be safely dissipated by the equipment. The usual reason for this limit is heat, although in certain electromechanical devices, particularly speakers, it is to prevent mechanical damage. When heat is the limiting factor, the power rating is easily calculated. First, the amount of heat that can be safely dissipated by the device, $P_{D,max}$, must be calculated. This is related to the maximum safe operating temperature, the ambient temperature or temperature range in which the device will be operated, and the method of cooling. If $T_{D,max}$ is the maximum safe operating temperature of the device, $T_{A}$ is the ambient temperature, and $\theta_{DA}$ is the total thermal resistance between the device and ambient, then the maximum heat dissipation is given by

$$P_{D,max} = \frac{T_{D,max} - T_{A}}{\theta_{DA}}$$

If all power in a device is dissipated as heat, then this is also the power rating.

=== Mechanical equipment ===
Equipment is generally rated by the power it will deliver, for example, at the shaft of an electric or hydraulic motor. The power input to the equipment will be greater owing to the less than 100% efficiency of the device. Efficiency of a device is often defined as the ratio of output power to the sum of output power and losses. In some types of equipment, it is possible to measure or calculate losses directly. This allows efficiency to be calculated with greater precision than the quotient of input power over output power, where relatively small measurement uncertainty will greatly affect the resulting calculated efficiency.

=== Power converting equipment ===
In devices that primarily convert between different forms of electric power, such as transformers, or transport it from one location to another, such as transmission lines, the power rating almost always refers to the maximum power flow through the device, not dissipation within it. The usual reason for the limit is heat, and the maximum heat dissipation is calculated as above.

Power ratings are usually given in watts for real power and volt-amperes for apparent power, although for devices intended for use in large power systems, both may be given in a per-unit system. Cables are usually rated by giving their maximum voltage and their ampacity. As the power rating depends on the method of cooling, different ratings may be specified for air cooling, water cooling, etc.

== Average vs. maximum ==
For AC-operated devices (e.g. coaxial cable, loudspeakers), there may even be two power ratings, a maximum (peak) power rating and an average power rating. For such devices, the peak power rating usually specifies the low frequency or pulse energy, while the average power rating limits high-frequency operation. Average power calculation rating depends on some assumptions about how the device is going to be used. For example, the EIA rating method for loudspeakers uses a shaped noise signal that simulates music and allows peak excursion of 6 dB, so an EIA rating of 50 Watts corresponds to 200 Watts peak rating.

== Maximum continuous rating ==
Maximum continuous rating (MCR) is defined as the maximum output (MW) that an electric power generating station is capable of producing continuously under normal conditions over a year. Under ideal conditions, the actual output could be higher than the MCR.

Within shipping, ships usually operate at the nominal continuous rating (NCR) which is 85% of the 90% of MCR. The 90% MCR is usually the contractual output for which the propeller is designed. Thus, the usual output at which ships are operated is around 75% to 77% of MCR.

== Other definitions ==
In some fields of engineering, even a more complex set of power ratings is used. For example, helicopter engines are rated for continuous power (which does not have a time constraint), takeoff and hover power rating (defined as half to one-hour operation), maximum contingency power (which can be sustained for two-three minutes), and emergency (half a minute) power rating.

For electrical motors, a similar kind of information is conveyed by the service factor, which is a multiplier that, when applied to the rated output power, gives the power level a motor can sustain for shorter periods of time. The service factor is typically in the 1.15-1.4 range, with the figure being lower for higher-power motors. For every hour of operation at the service-factor-adjusted power rating, a motor loses two to three hours of life at nominal power, i.e. its service life is reduced to less than half for continued operation at this level. The service factor is defined in the ANSI/NEMA MG 1 standard, and is generally used in the United States. There is no IEC standard for the service factor.

Exceeding the power rating of a device by more than the margin of safety set by the manufacturer usually does damage to the device by causing its operating temperature to exceed safe levels. In semiconductors, irreparable damage can occur very quickly. Exceeding the power rating of most devices for a very short period of time is not harmful, although doing so regularly can sometimes cause cumulative damage.

Power ratings for electrical apparatus and transmission lines are a function of the duration of the proposed load and the ambient temperature; a transmission line or transformer, for example, can carry significantly more load in cold weather than in hot weather. Momentary overloads, causing high temperatures and deterioration of insulation, may be considered an acceptable trade-off in emergency situations. The power rating of switching devices varies depending on the circuit voltage as well as the current. In certain aerospace or military applications, a device may carry a much higher rating than would be accepted in devices intended to operate for long service life.

== Examples ==
=== Audio amplifiers ===
Audio amplifier power ratings are typically established by driving the device under test to the onset of clipping, to a predetermined distortion level, variable per manufacturer or per product line. Driving an amplifier to 1% distortion levels will yield a higher rating than driving it to 0.01% distortion levels. Similarly, testing an amplifier at a single mid-range frequency, or testing just one channel of a two-channel amplifier, will yield a higher rating than if it is tested throughout its intended frequency range with both channels working. Manufacturers can use these methods to market amplifiers whose published maximum power output includes some amount of clipping in order to show higher numbers.

For instance, the Federal Trade Commission (FTC) established an amplifier rating system in which the device is tested with both channels driven throughout its advertised frequency range, at no more than its published distortion level. The Electronic Industries Association (EIA) rating system, however, determines amplifier power by measuring a single channel at 1,000 Hz, with a 1% distortion level—1% clipping. Using the EIA method rates an amplifier 10 to 20% higher than the FTC method.

=== Photovoltaic modules ===
The nominal power of a photovoltaic module is determined by measuring current and voltage while varying resistance under defined illumination. The conditions are specified in standards such as IEC 61215, IEC 61646 and UL 1703; specifically, the light intensity is 1000 W/m^{2}, with a spectrum similar to sunlight hitting the Earth's surface at latitude 35° N in the summer (airmass 1.5) and temperature of the cells at 25 °C. The power is measured while varying the resistive load on the module between open and closed circuit.

The maximum power measured is the nominal power of the module in Watts. Colloquially, this is also written as "W_{p}"; this format is colloquial as it is outside the standard by adding suffixes to standardized units. The nominal power divided by the light power that falls on the module (area x 1000 W/m^{2}) is the efficiency.

== See also ==
- Effective radiated power, the regulatory analog for VHF, UHF and FM broadcasting
