= M548 =

American tracked cargo carrier

M548 cargo carrier
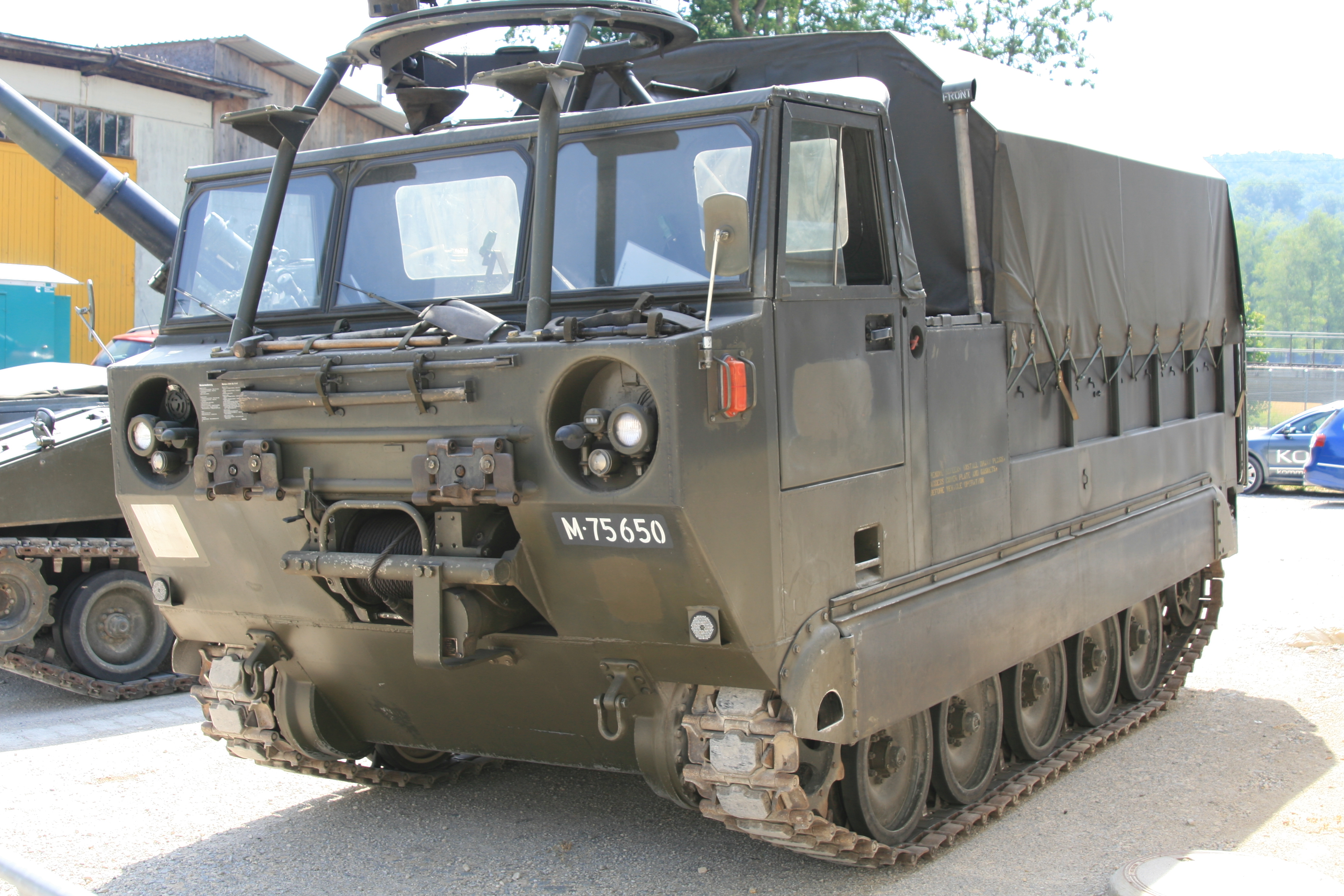
- M548 in the Armee Museum Full
- Type: Cargo carrier
- Place of origin: United States

Service history
- In service: 1960–present
- Used by: See Operators
- Wars: Vietnam War; Yom Kippur War; Iran–Iraq War; Gulf War; Iraqi Civil War (2014–2017); Israel-Hamas war (2023-present)

Production history
- Manufacturer: FMC Corp. Oto Melara

Specifications
- Mass: 12.8 tonnes (14.1 short tons; 12.6 long tons) (5 t Cargo)
- Length: 5.89 metres (19 ft 4 in)
- Width: 2.686 metres (8 ft 9.7 in)
- Height: 2.81 metres (9 ft 3 in)
- Crew: 4
- Armor: none
- Main armament: M2 Browning machine gun
- Engine: Detroit Diesel 6V53, 6-cylinder diesel engine 204 hp
- Suspension: torsion bar, 5 road wheels
- Operational range: 480 km (300 mi)
- Maximum speed: 61 km/h (38 mph)

The M548 is a tracked cargo carrier. It is based on the M113 armored personnel carrier, and was built by FMC Corp. at its San Jose, California, and Charleston, West Virginia facilities.

== Design ==
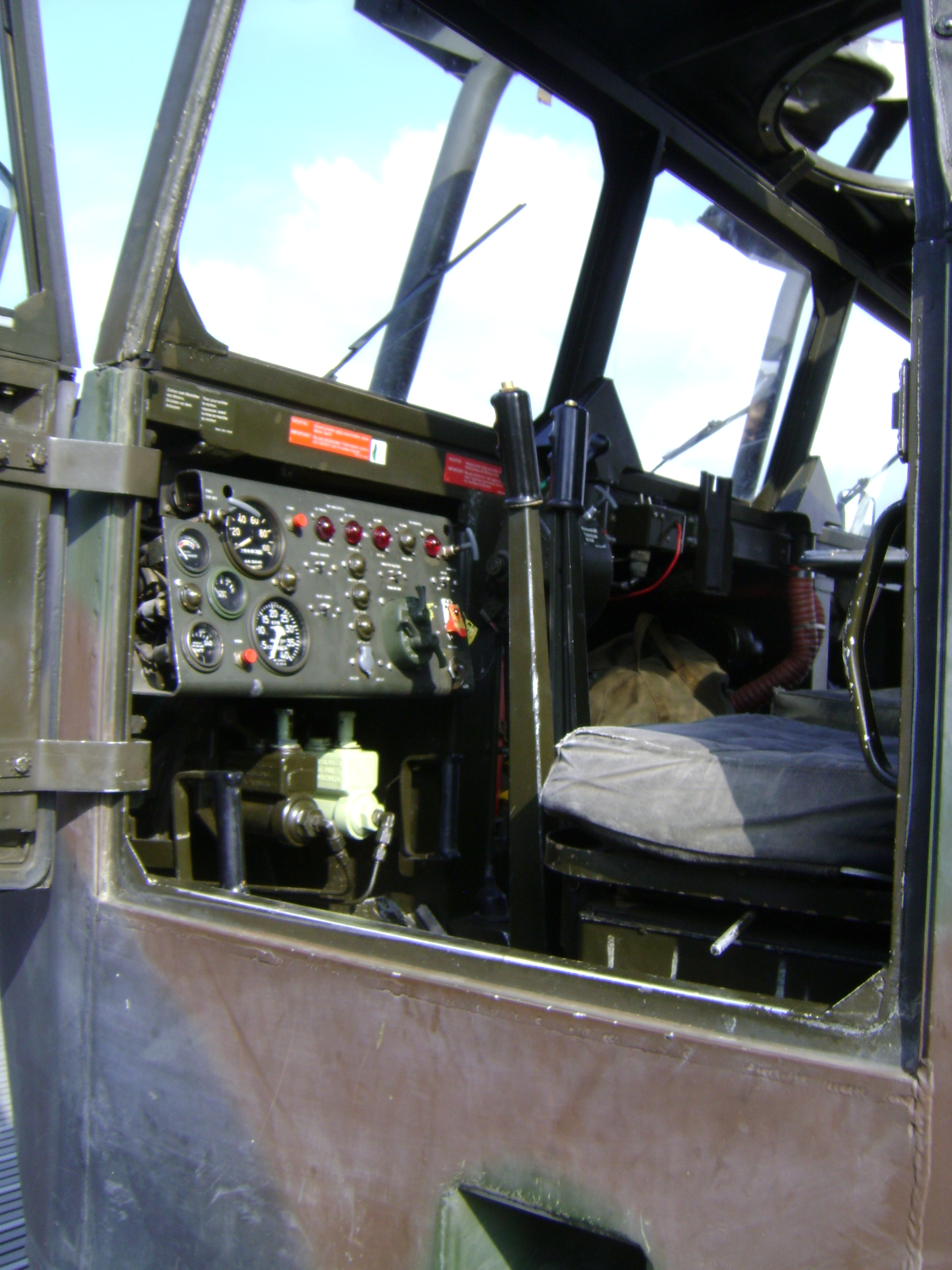
Driving position

Its light weight allows the use of a relatively small engine to power the vehicle, a 6V53 Detroit two-stroke six cylinder diesel, with an Allison TX-100-1 three-speed automatic transmission, and allows the vehicle to carry a large payload cross-country and to be transported by fixed and rotary-wing aircraft.

The driveline consists of a front sprocket, five roadwheels and a rear tensioner. Suspension is by torsion bar. Support rollers are not necessary because of the taut and relatively light track. In off-road driving, the driver must be careful to keep the track tension constant. Even with a failed torsion bar the M548 is still roadworthy. The power of the motor drives the transfer gearcase, generator and the cooling of the differential/steering gear. The transfer gearcase can be used as a separating clutch when towing the vehicle and serves to reduce the motor's speed. The power transmission between the drive follows the torque converter with an automatic lock-up clutch.

== Variants ==
=== United States ===
M548A1

NATO Stock Number (NSN) 2350–01–096–9356

It has the same improvements as M113A2. Improved suspension and cooling system. Entered service in 1982.

M548A2

M548A3

NATO Stock Number (NSN) 2350-01-369-6081

M1015

Modified M548 to carry Electronic Warfare Shelters. Modifications included installation of 60W, 400hz power system and ground rod driver. EW Shelters carried included the AN/MLQ-24 TACJAM, and AN/TSQ-138 Trailblazer Direction Finding systems.

=== Swiss Army ===
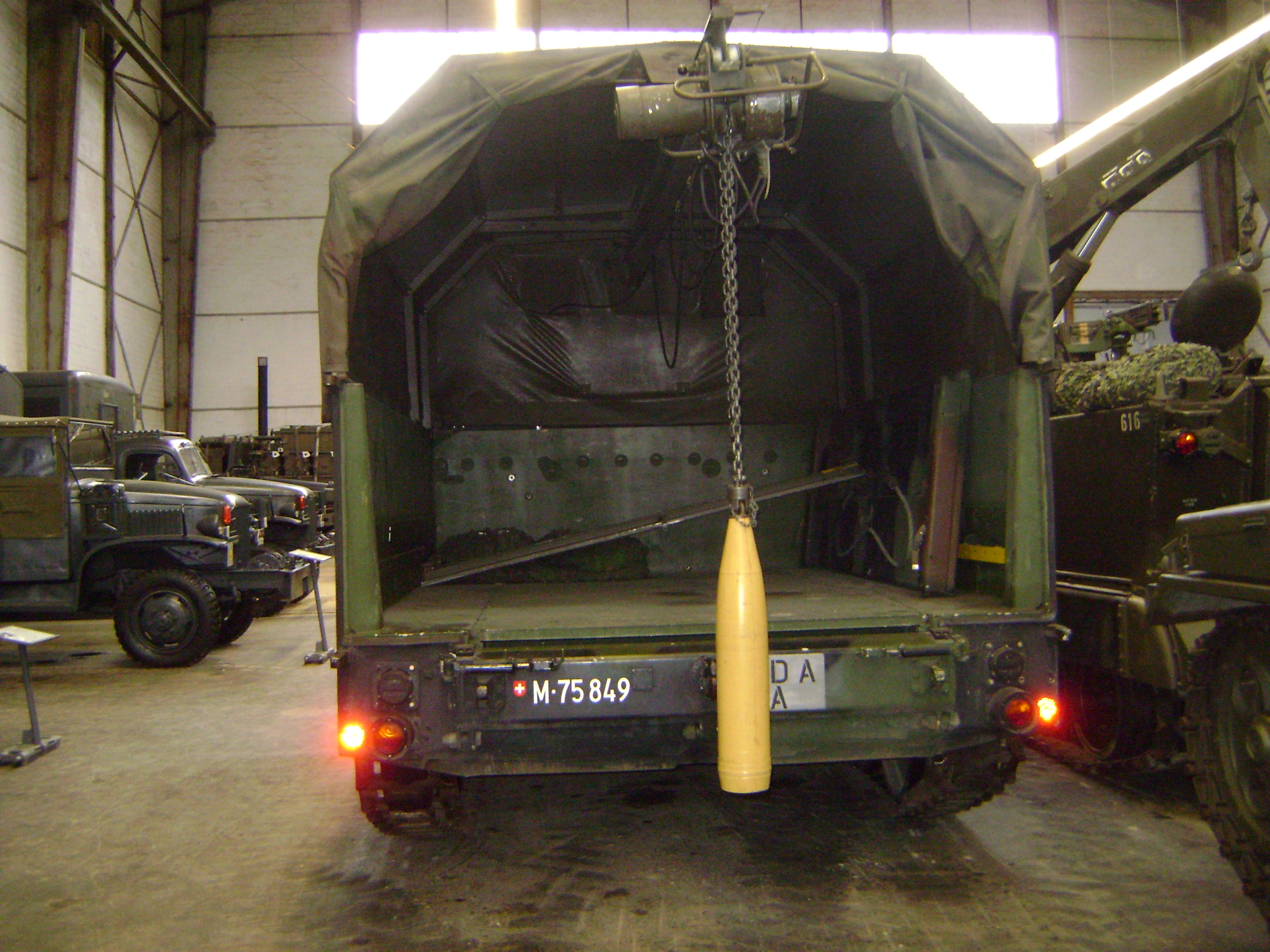
The M548's cargo compartment, yellow artillery shell on winch

- Raupentransportwagen 68 (Rpe Trspw 68) M548 Munitionstransport (tracked transport vehicle 68, M548 ammunition transporter).
- Raupentransportwagen 88 Model 88 (Swiss military license plates M+75829 to M+75882) came into service between 1986 and 1988, in total 54 units. Unlike the previous model 68, the model 88 has "Fleckentarnanstrich" ("stain camouflage pattern") as well as improved diesel heating.
- Raupentransportwagen 68/05

The M548 was mainly used as ammunition transporter in units equipped with the self-propelled M109 howitzer. Also, the armor and weapons mechanic school's recruits, as well as at the tank mortar unit 16/5, used the M548. The usual load is ten pallets of eight 155 mm projectiles including charges and detonators. The handling is done with an electric hoist.

=== British Army ===
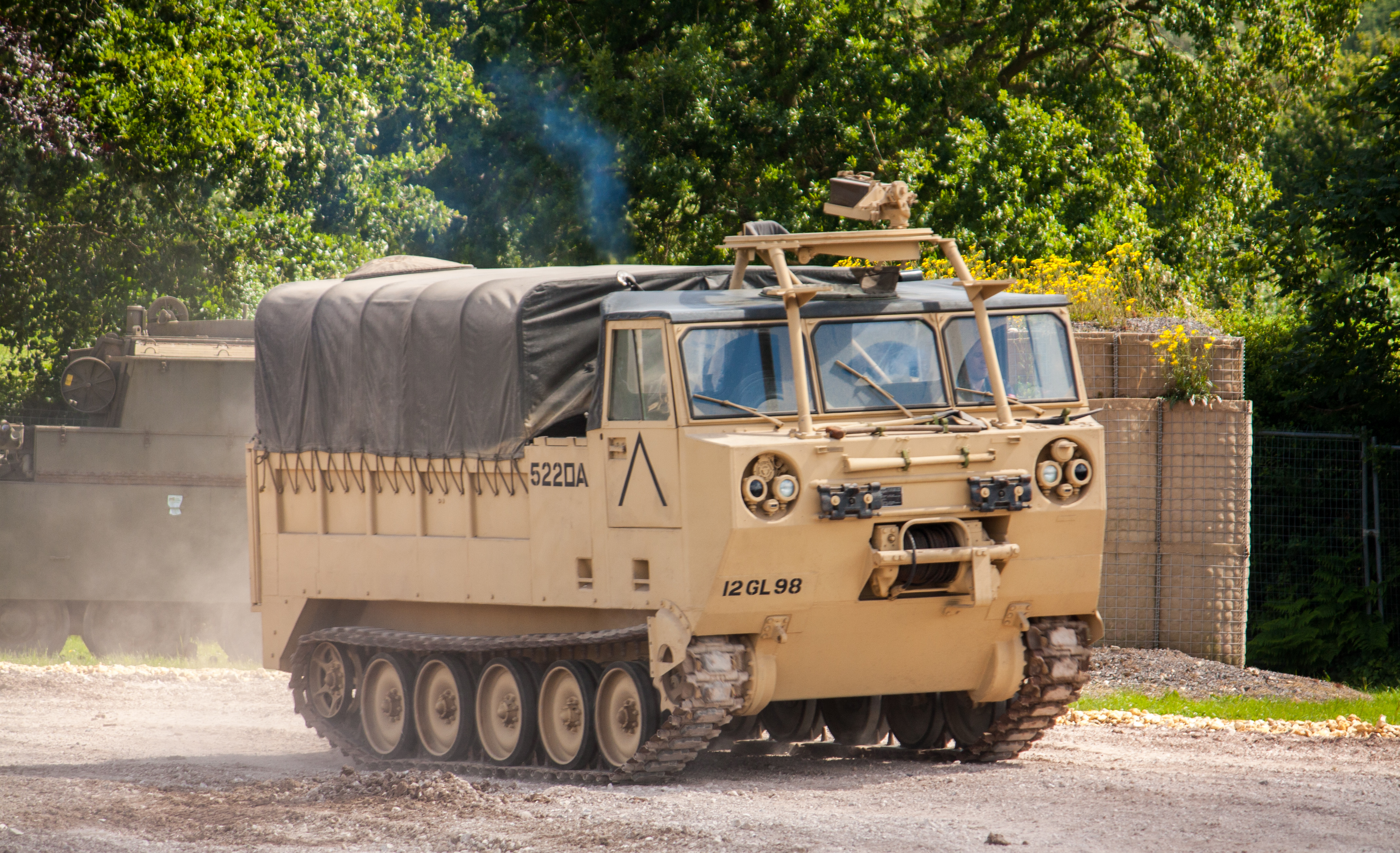
British M548

The British Army used the M548 as logistical support for (UK) Armoured Division in the 1991 Gulf War.

The M548 was also used as the basis for the Tracked Rapier anti-aircraft missile system, originally intended for the Iranian Army but delivered to the British Army after the revolution caused the order to be cancelled.

On 25 February 1991, a pair of M548s crewed by personnel of the Royal Electrical and Mechanical Engineers, were supporting 16th/5th The Queen's Royal Lancers who were providing the reconnaissance for the division. They were attacked by an Iraqi Type 59 tank. One M548 was disabled and the Type 59 reengaged the second M548 who returned fire with small arms. Two crewmen (Sergeant Dowling, MM and Lance Corporal F. Evans, REME) were killed.

=== Gallery ===
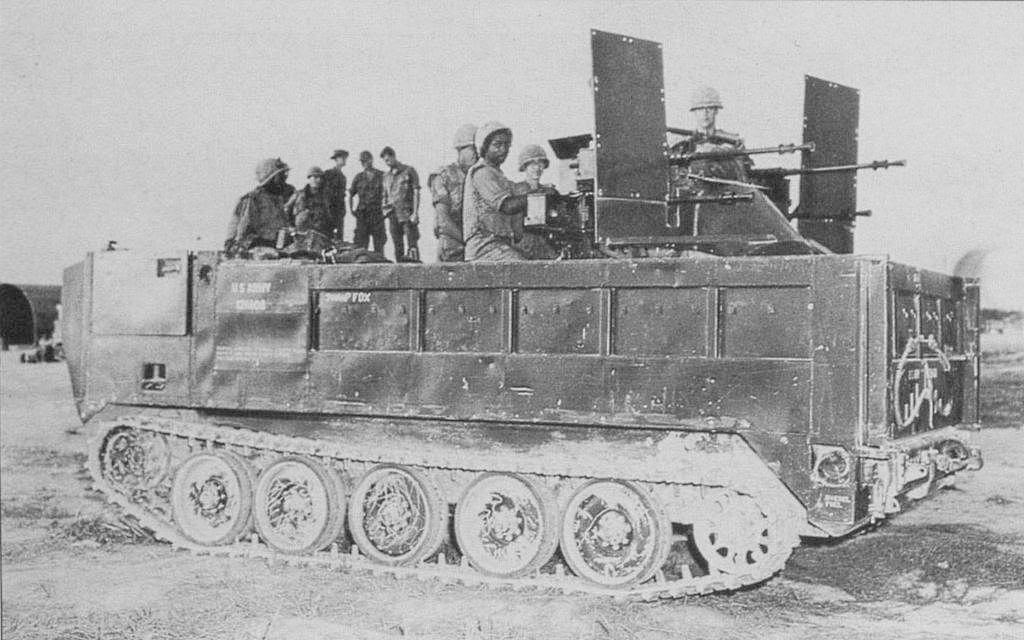
M548 with quad 0.50 calibre heavy machine guns, belonging to Battery G, 55th Air Defense Artillery Regiment, 23rd Infantry Division, Vietnam war

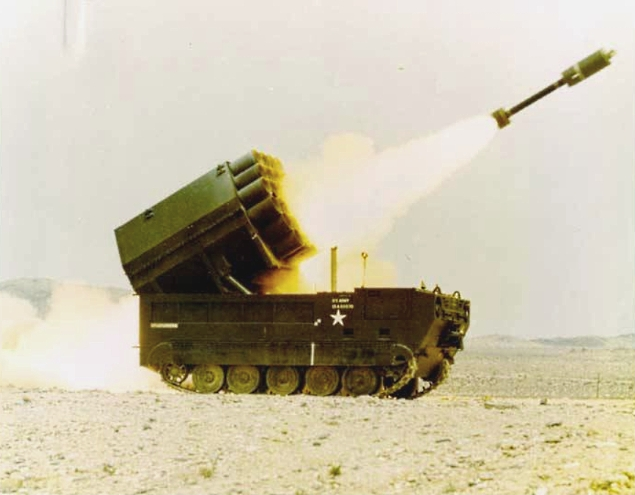
M548 firing a XM130 SLUFAE rocket

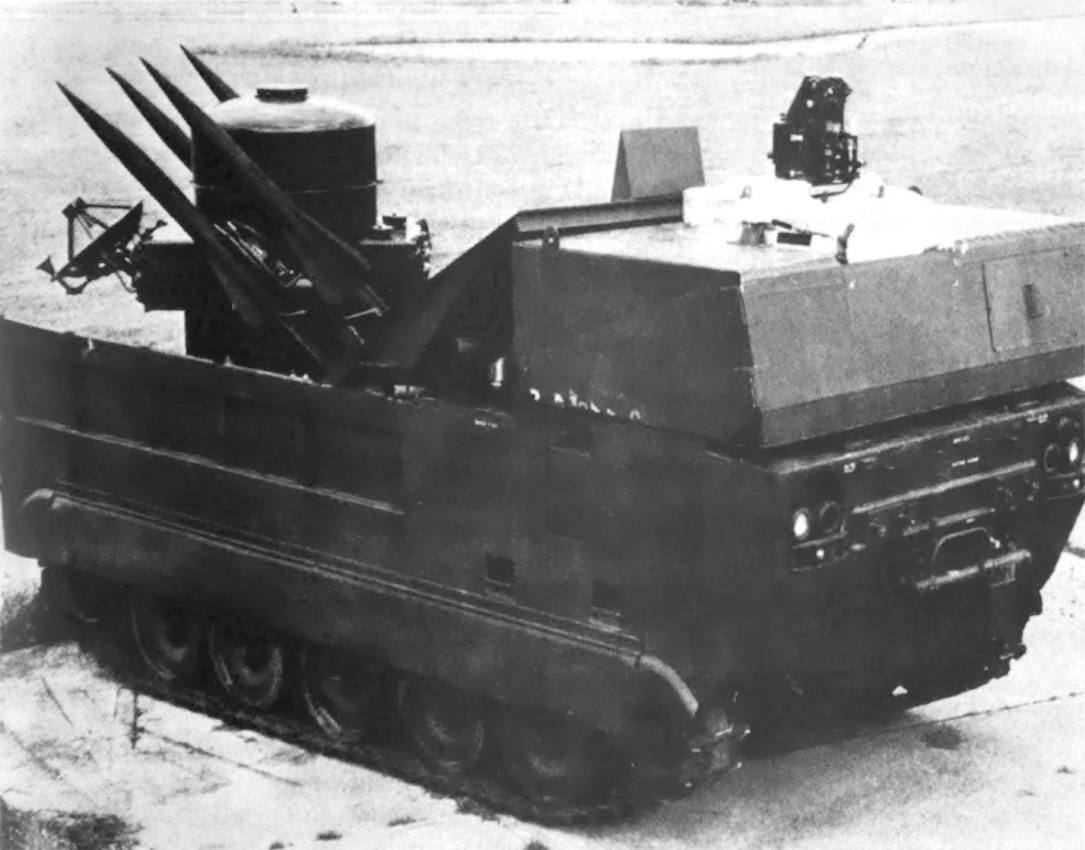
Prototype Tracked Rapier based on an M548 chassis

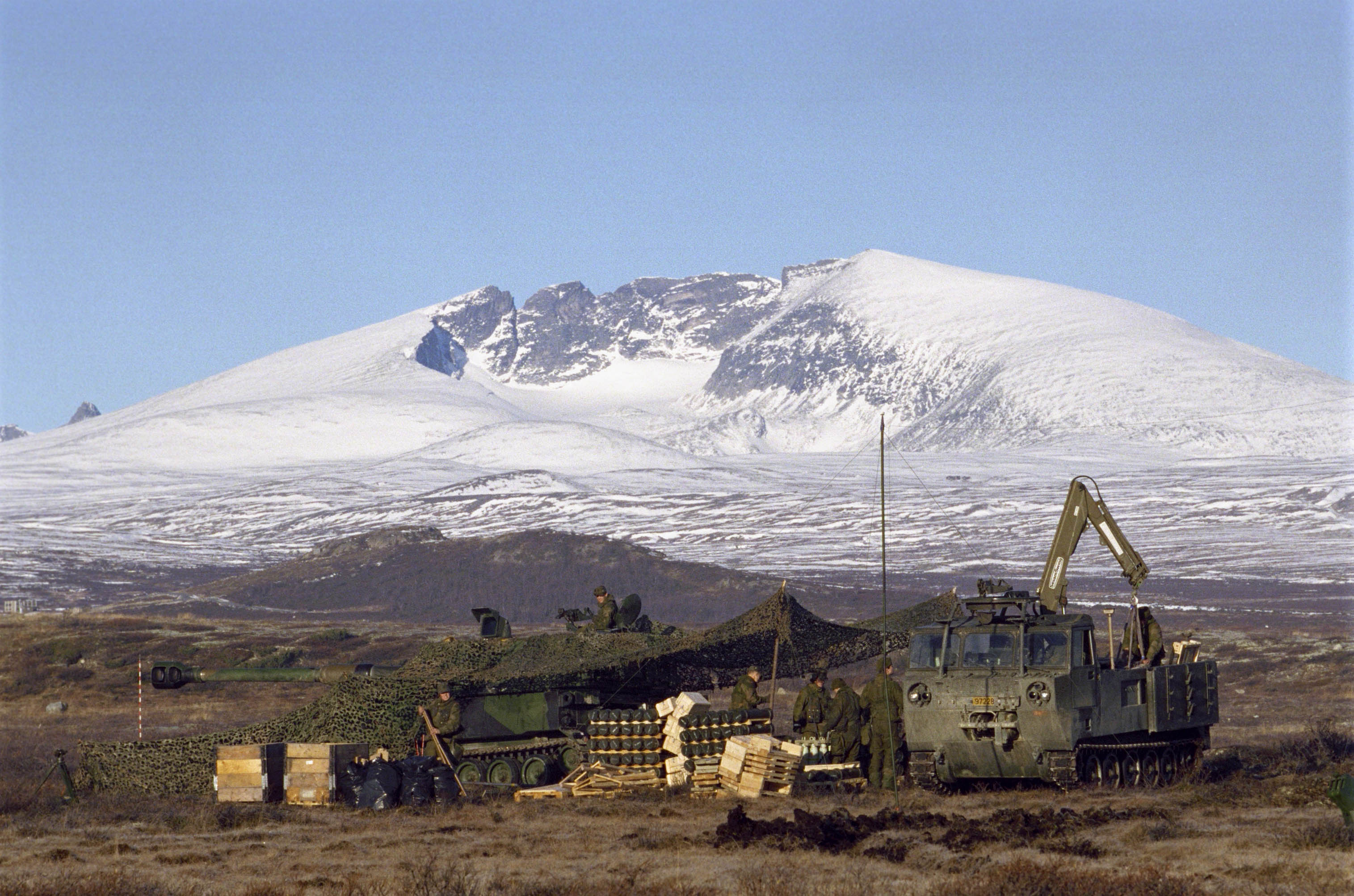
M548 in Norwegian service supplying an artillery position. Known as the NM199 in Norwegian service

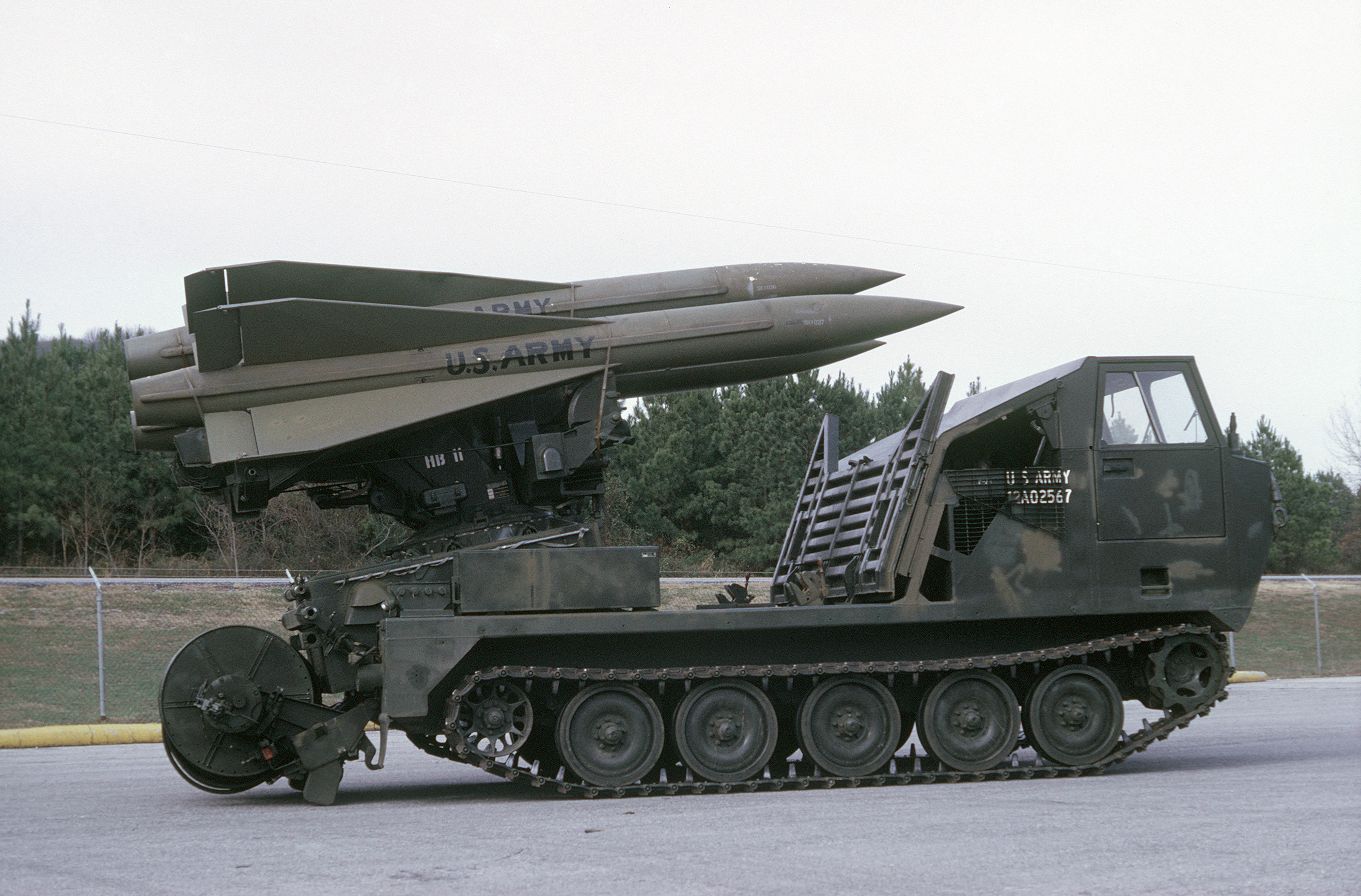
M727 Hawk Guided Missile Equipment Carrier, based on the M548

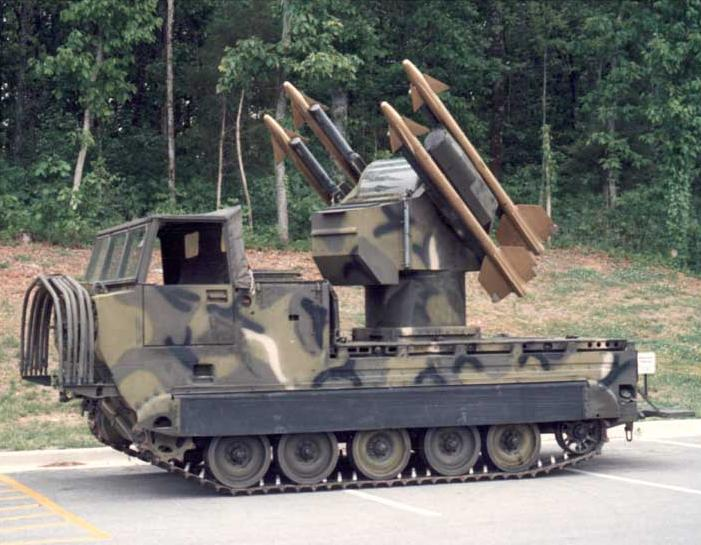
M730 Chaparral Guided missile Carrier, based on the M548

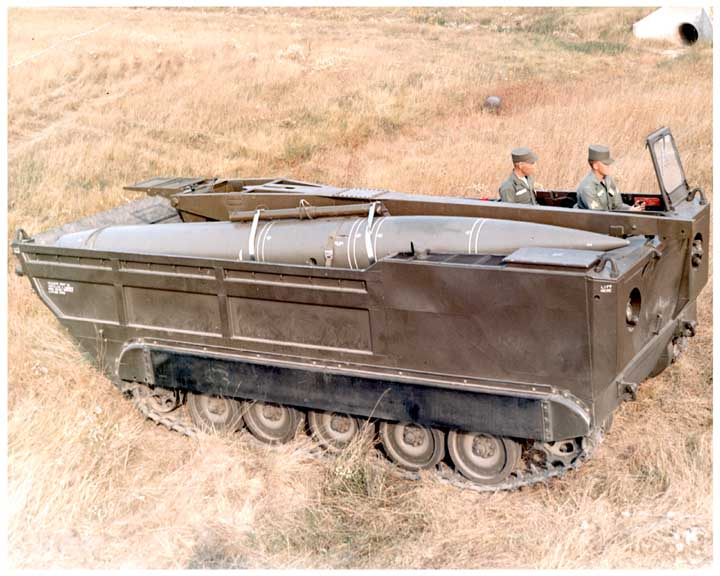
M667 Lance Self Propelled Launcher, based on the M548

== Operators ==
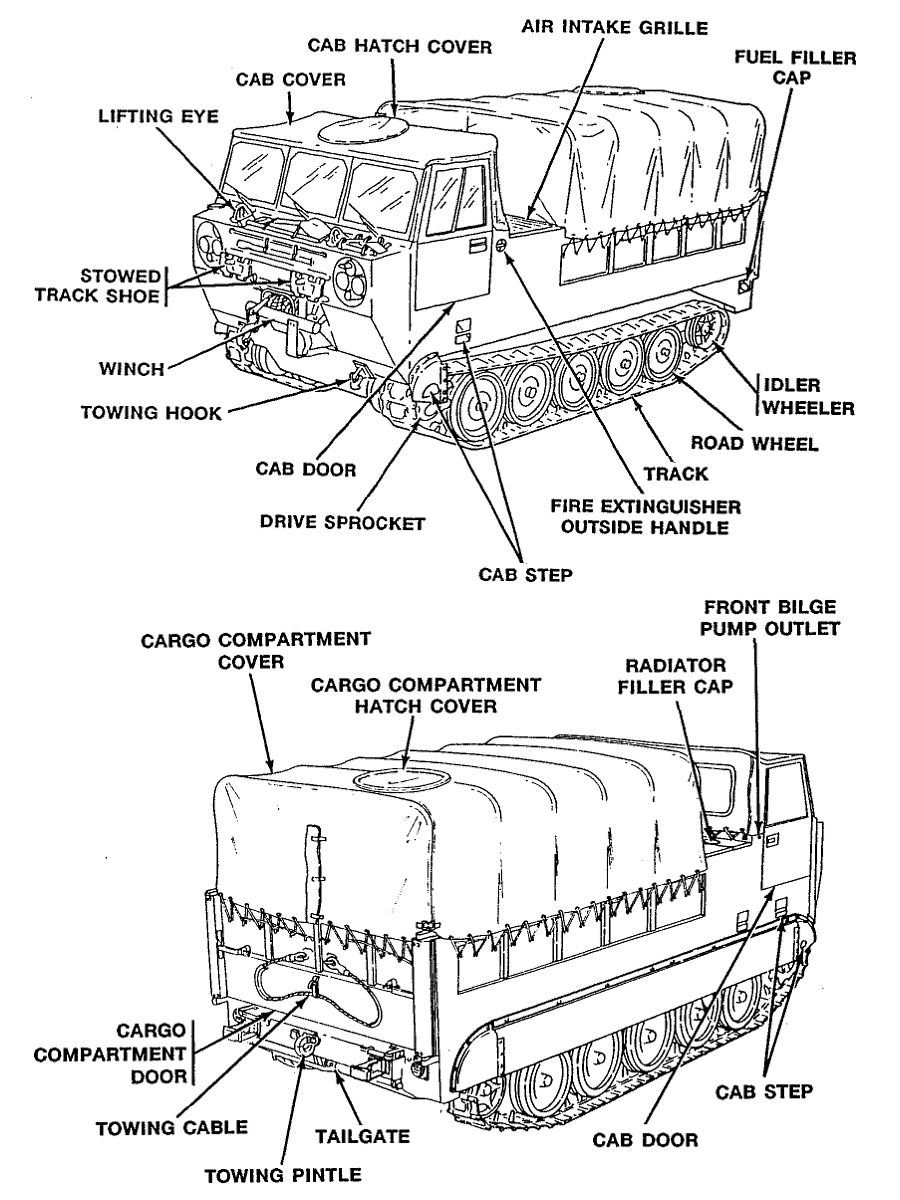
Major components of the M548

- Argentina: 28 M548A1 in service.
- Australia
- Bahrain
- Canada
- Chile: M548A1 in service.
- Iran
- Iraq: M548A1 in service.
- Israel: Local designation M548 Alfa.
- Italy: 210 M548 in service.
- Norway: Local designation NM199; in long term storage
- Portugal
- Saudi Arabia
- South Korea
- Spain
- Switzerland
- United Kingdom
- Ukraine
- United States
- Vietnam

=== Captures ===
- Islamic State: ISIL has seized two vehicles. The first one was captured from Iraqi-Shia militants in Khalidiya Island and the second one was captured from the PMF's 30th Brigade in the "Al-Sajr" area.

=== Former operators ===
- Kingdom of Saudi Arabia - (Flag used from 1938 to 1973)
- Bahrain - (Flag used from 1972 to 2002.)
- Francoist Spain
- Pahlavi Iran
- Italian Republic - (Flag used from 2003 to 2006)
- Estado Novo (Portugal) - (Flag used from 1933 to 1974)
- National Salvation Junta - (Flag used from 1974 to 1975)
- South Vietnam
- New Zealand

== Bibliography ==
- Heller, Urs: Die Panzer der Schweizer Armee von 1920 bis 2008
- Schweizerische Militärmuseum Full
