= DKW RT 100 =

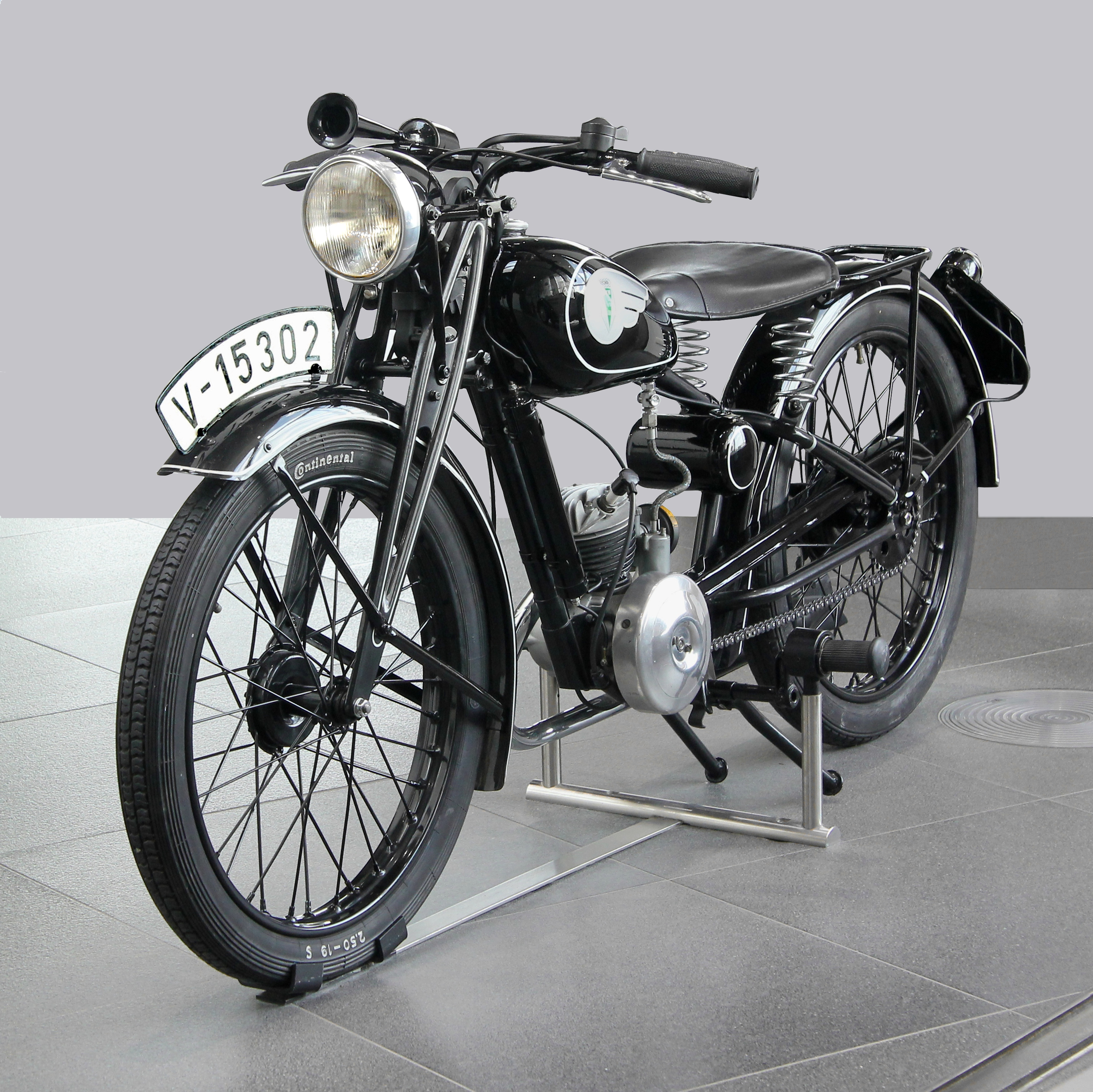
- Manufacturer: Auto Union AG
- Production: 1934−1940
- Engine: → see table

The DKW RT 100 is a motorcycle produced by Auto Union AG at the DKW main plant in Zschopau. It was developed under the direction of DKW's chief designer, Hermann Weber, first presented to the public in 1934, and over 70,000 units were manufactured before production ceased. It was the best-selling DKW motorcycle of the 1930s. The abbreviation "RT", in conjunction with the brand name DKW, stands for "Reichstyp". The manufacturer also marketed the motorcycle under the names "RT 2 ½ PS" and "RT 3 PS", derived from its engine power.

== Technical details ==
The frame is an open-bottomed Single cradle in which the engine is mounted as a load-bearing element, effectively "bridging" the frame. Front suspension is provided by a Girder Fork using a coil spring, and from 1936 onwards, rubber-band suspension. The rear wheel has no suspension. All parts of the motorcycle were painted a uniform black at the factory. Light-colored pinstriping on the fenders, fuel tank, tool box (cylindrical in shape and located within the frame beneath the saddle), and fork blades relieved the visual appearance.

The DKW RT 100 features an airstream-cooled single cylinder Two-stroke engine with a flat-top piston and Schnuerle porting. It is equipped with a hand-operated three-speed gearbox; initially, this used a straight gear lever mounted directly on the transmission, but after the production of approximately 200 units, this was replaced by a short shift lever guided within a gate on the fuel tank. Power is transmitted from the gearbox to the rear wheel via a single-row roller chain protected by a chain guard.

The 1936 RT 3 PS model featured a new cylinder with larger cooling fins. Further changes included a headlight housing that was now teardrop-shaped and—starting with engine number 864201—a magneto providing 6 V instead of 4 V.

== Specifications ==
	RT 100 (2 ½ PS)	RT 125/2 (3 PS)
Production	1934–1936	1936–1940
Engine	airstream-cooled single cylinder Two-stroke engine, Kick start	
Design	piston-controlled inlet port	
Scavenging	Schnuerle porting	
Bore × Stroke	50 mm × 50 mm (2.0 in × 2.0 in)	
Displacement	98.2 cc (5.99 cu in)	
Compression ratio	5.7 : 1	5.9 : 1
Power rating	2.5 PS (1.8 kW)	3 PS (2.2 kW)
Introduction of fuel	carburetor	
Lubrication	total-loss lubrication system, fuel-to-oil ratio 20 : 1	
Transmission	3-speed helical gearbox, claw-switched; chain drive	
Frame	single cradle steel frame	
Wheelbase	1,225 mm (48.2 in)	
Seat height	around 700 mm (28 in)	
Front suspension	girder fork with coil spring suspension (from 1936: with rubber band suspension)	girder fork with coil rubber band suspension
Rear suspension	rigid frame	
Front brake	simplex drum brake (half-hub), bowden cable operated	
Rear brake	simplex drum brake (half-hub), bowden cable operated	
Curb weight	45 kg (99 lb)	50 kg (110 lb)
Top speed	60 km/h (37 mph)	65 km/h (40 mph)

== Royal Enfield replica ==
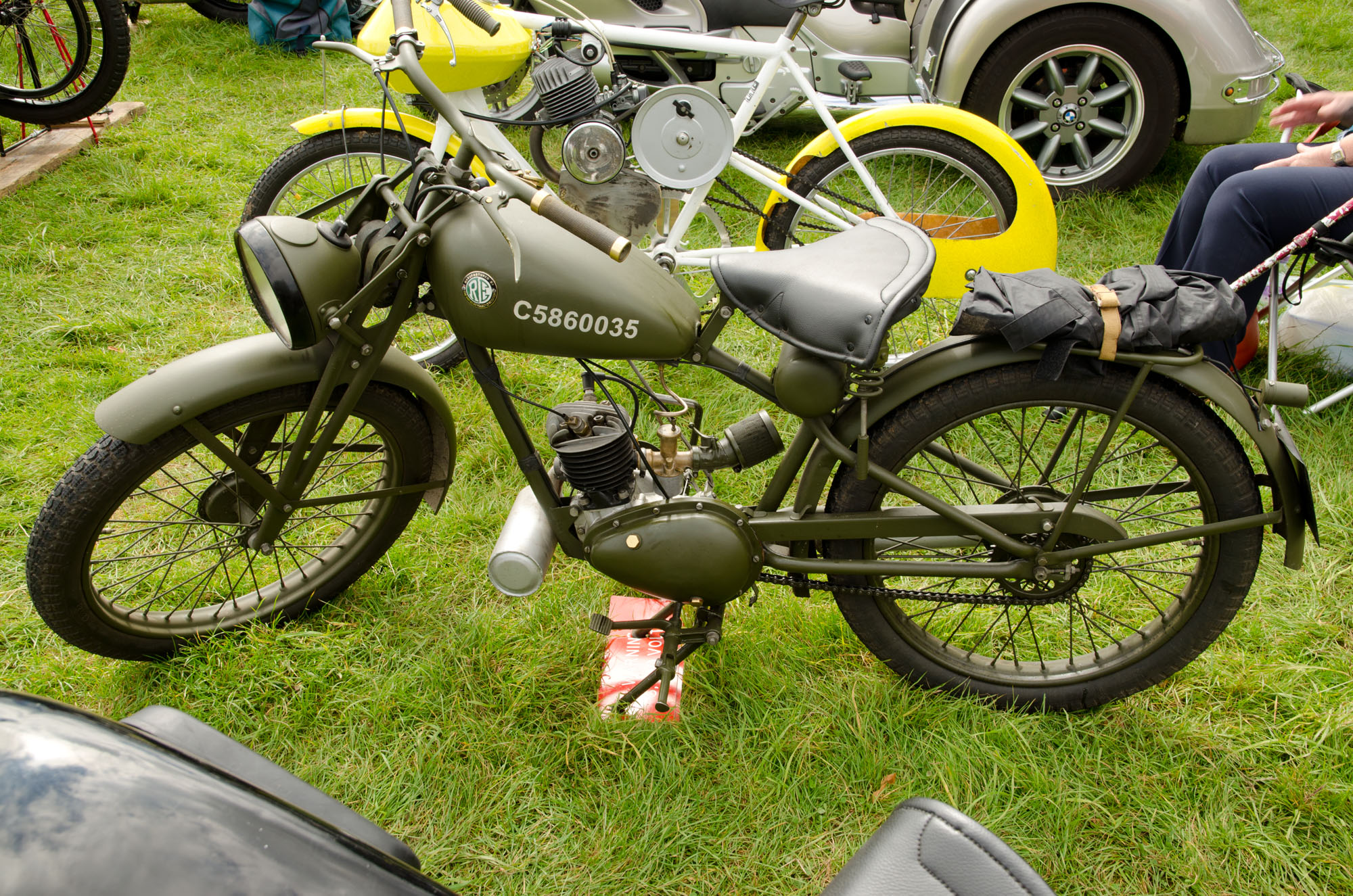
Royal Enfield WD/RE Flying Flea at the Cholmondeley Classic Car Show

The RT 100 was copied in England as early as World War II. From 1939, Royal Enfield produced the model WD/RE, also known as the "Flying Flea." Packed in wooden crates, the Flying Flea was dropped by parachute from aircraft for British ground units. After the war, a civilian version with an engine displacement increased to 125 cc was manufactured.

== Sources ==
- Frank Rönicke (2007), DKW-Motorräder 1920–1970 – Typenkompass (in German), Stuttgart: Motorbuch Verlag, pp. 66, 68–69, ISBN 978-3-613-02633-9
