= Worldwide Power Products =

Worldwide Power Products, LLC
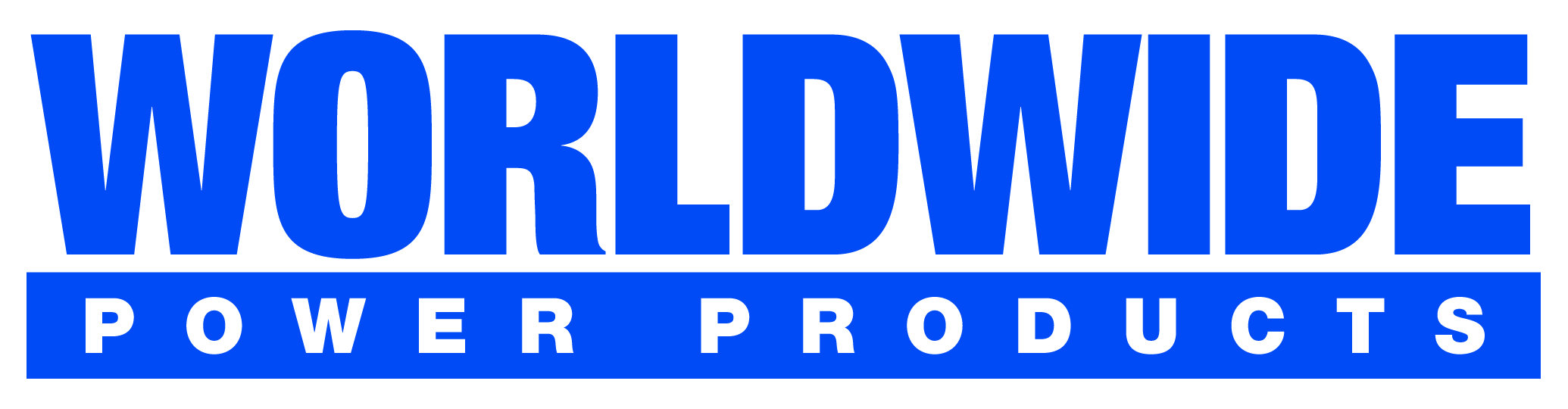
- Type: Private company
- Industry: Temporary Power Generation, Generator hire
- Founded: 2001; 25 years ago
- Headquarters: Houston, Texas, United States
- Area served: Worldwide
- Key people: Will Perry, President; Mark Lum, Executive Vice-President
- Products: Generators, Engine-Generators, Engines
- Revenue: $25,000,000 (2011)
- Website: www.wpowerproducts.com

Worldwide Power Products, is an American supplier of temporary power generation equipment. The company primarily retails Caterpillar and Cummins equipment, but also offers Detroit Diesel and Kohler brands, among others. The company offers generator sets from 10 to 2,500 kW and engines from 150 to 4,000 hp.

In November 2011, WPP was named to Forbes' America's Most Promising Companies list.

== History ==
Will Perry founded Worldwide Power Products in 2008. In 2009, Perry brought in Mark Lum to serve as the company's Executive Vice-President. WPP earned a spot on the 2011 America's Most Promising Companies list. Along with this accolade, Perry has won the Entrepreneurs' Organization Houston's Entrepreneur of the Year award and was named to the Houston Business Journal's Top 40 under 40 list.

== Operations ==
Worldwide Power Products bases both the sales and rental departments at its headquarters in Houston, TX. Most deals involve diesel generators and industrial engines. WPP offers products, such as the Caterpillar 3512C generator pictured at the right, for the manufacturing, industrial, marine, and petroleum industries.

Approximately 70% of all of WPP's business is international. Over the course of the company's life, WPP has made deals in 75 different countries. In particular, after the 2011 Tōhoku earthquake and tsunami in Japan, WPP shipped out 6,000 kilowatts of power to Japan in 48 hours. And then later that same year, they sent 30 portable generators to the East Coast to help with the recovery from Hurricane Irene.
