= Uniflow engine =

A uniflow engine is a piston engine where gas flow through the cylinder proceeds in a single unidirectional flow, without reversals between strokes. This gives thermodynamic advantages as each group of ports can stabilise at an equilibrium temperature, rather than being alternately heated and cooled. For internal combustion engines, scavenging is also improved by this consistent flow direction.

- Uniflow steam engine, a steam engine with a long uniflow cylinder that receives inlet steam at each end (for a double-acting engine) and exhausts through ports at the centre.
- Uniflow diesel engine, a two-stroke diesel engine with inlet through piston-ported fixed ports in the lower part of the cylinder, and exhaust through valves in the cylinder head.
- Opposed-piston diesel engines, where two cylinders share opposite ends of the same cylinder. These use piston-controlled ports for both inlet and exhaust.
