= Detroit Diesel Series 53 =

Series 53
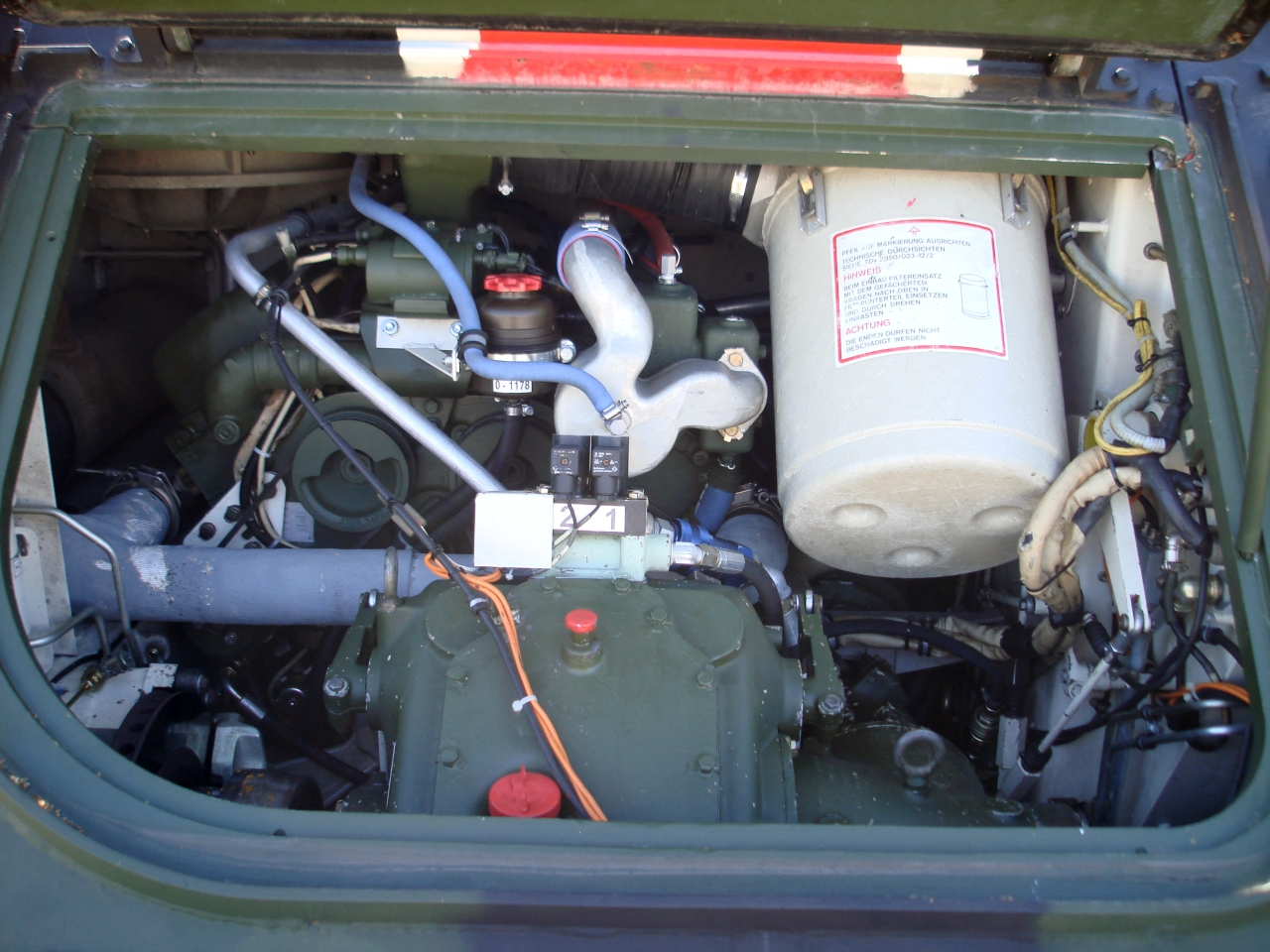
- 6V-53 in a M113 armored personnel carrier

Overview
- Manufacturer: Detroit Diesel
- Production: 1957–1995

Layout
- Configuration: Multi-cylinder, inline and V-type
- Displacement: 53 cu in (0.9 L) (per cylinder)
- Cylinder bore: 3 7/8 in (98 mm)
- Piston stroke: 4 1/2 in (114 mm)
- Cylinder block material: Cast iron
- Valvetrain: Pushrod-operated 2 or 4 valves per cyl.
- Compression ratio: 17.0:1 (N/A); 18.7:1 (Turbo); 21.0:1 ("N"ew)

Combustion
- Turbocharger: On some versions
- Fuel system: Unit fuel injection
- Fuel type: Diesel
- Cooling system: Water-cooled

Output
- Power output: 98–233 hp (73–174 kW)
- Torque output: 205–568 lb⋅ft (278–770 N⋅m)

Dimensions
- Length: 33–40 in (840–1,020 mm)
- Width: 27–40 in (690–1,020 mm)
- Height: 35–41 in (890–1,040 mm)
- Dry weight: 965–1,695 lb (438–769 kg)

Chronology
- Predecessor: Series 71
- Successor: Series 50

The Detroit Diesel Series 53 is a two-stroke diesel engine series, available in both inline and V configurations, manufactured by Detroit Diesel as a more compact alternative to the older Series 71 for medium and heavy duty trucks. The number 53 refers to the nominal swept displacement per cylinder in cubic inches.

Inline models included two, three, and four cylinders, and the V-types six and eight cylinders.

== History ==
The Series 53 was introduced in 1957; in 1961, the 4-53 and 6V-53 were introduced as options for the 1962 model year Chevrolet-branded medium and heavy duty trucks.

Production of Series 53 engines ended in the 1990s along with other two-stroke Detroit Diesel designs, as tightening emissions regulations could not be met with their design.

== Design ==
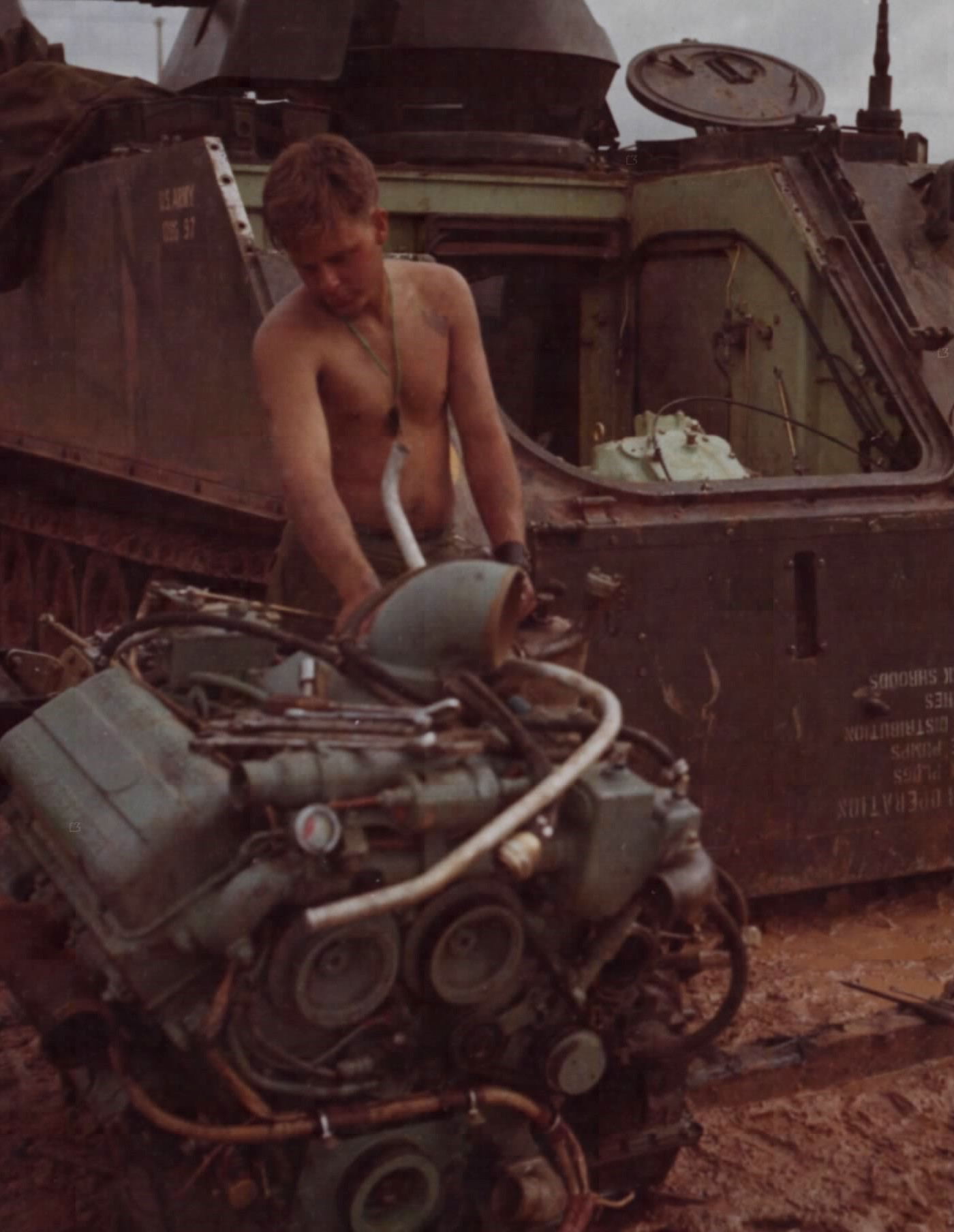
SP4 Stanley Taylor works on a 6V-53 removed from a M113 at Thủ Đức Water Treatment Plant (1968).

Bore and stroke are the same across all units, at 3 7/8 in × 4 1/2 in (98 mm × 114 mm). These engines use a single camshaft per cylinder bank, paired with a balancing shaft for inline engines, or a second camshaft for the other cylinder bank in vee-block engines. The flywheel drives either one camshaft or the balancing shaft via an idler gear, depending on the specific engine configuration.

Because the Series 53 engines are equipped with a blower which provides relatively little additional intake air pressure, in common with most Detroit Diesel two-cycle engines, they are designated as "naturally aspirated" according to SAE. However, turbocharged variants of the Series 53 exist.

=== Combustion cycle ===
Two-stroke diesel uniflow engine animation

In common with similar, contemporaneous two-stroke diesel engines, including the Detroit Diesel Series 71 and EMD 567, the Series 53 does not use crankcase aspiration and cannot naturally draw in combustion air; the Series 53 engines are fitted with a gear-driven Roots blower mounted to the exterior of the engine, which is inherently necessary to charge the cylinders with air for combustion. The air intake ports are through passages bored into the sides of the cylinder sleeves, rather than in the cylinder head.

Intake air is discharged from the blower into an air chamber in the cylinder block; when the intake ports are uncovered by the downward stroke of the piston, the air from the air chamber enters the combustion chamber. These intake ports are angled to impart a swirling motion to the intake air. As the piston continues to travel upward, the air intake ports are covered by the side of the piston and the air trapped in the cylinder is compressed and heated.

Unit fuel injection is employed, one injector per cylinder; each unit injector is responsible for metering the fuel, pressurizing it, and atomizing it when it is injected into the cylinder. No high fuel pressure exists outside of the injector body. The atomized fuel combusts when is injected into the heated, compressed air in the cylinder, creating the power stroke and pushing the piston downward. The injectors are cycled from the same camshaft responsible for opening the exhaust valves.

Shortly after the combustion (power) stroke, the camshaft opens pushrod-operated poppet valves in the cylinder head(s) to allow engine exhaust to escape, through either two or four valves per cylinder. As the piston continues downward, it uncovers the air intake ports again, which helps to displace exhaust gases. This is an example of uniflow scavenging; since the intake air enters at slightly greater than atmospheric pressure, the blower also assists in scavenging spent combustion gasses at the end of the power stroke. When scavenging is complete, the exhaust valves are closed and air continues to be taken in to the cylinder until the intake ports are covered again by the upward motion of the piston.

=== Basic arrangement ===
Most Series 53 engines were "symmetrical," meaning that the blower, exhaust, water manifold, starter, and other components could be mounted on either side of the basic block to fit a particular application. In addition, the engines were designed to run with the crankshaft turning either clockwise or counter-clockwise, called "Left Hand" or "Right Hand" rotation engines, respectively, as viewed from the flywheel side of the engine.

Viewed from the flywheel side of the engine, inline engines could be classified into one of eight basic arrangements, depending on the direction of rotation and location of the blower and exhaust manifold. Similarly, vee-block engines could be classified into one of four basic arrangements, depending on the direction of rotation and the location of the starter and oil cooler.

Series 53 basic engine arrangements
Inline Rotation	Exh. (Note: Position of the exhaust manifold either on the (L)eft or (R)ight side, viewed from the flywheel side of the engine.)	Blower (Note: Position of the blower either on the (L)eft or (R)ight side, viewed from the flywheel side of the engine. The blower is driven either by the balance shaft (B) or camshaft (C); the governor is driven by the opposite shaft, so for example, when the blower is driven by the balance shaft, the governor is driven by the camshaft.)	Idler (Note: The idler is driven directly by the flywheel, and in turn, for inline engines, drives either the balance shaft (B) or camshaft (C). The balance shaft and camshaft are meshed together so that turning one will turn the other.)	Exh.	Blower	Idler	Exh.	Blower	Idler	Exh.	Blower	Idler
Left (CW)	R	L (C)	B	L	L (B)	C	L	R (C)	C	R	R (B)	B
Left (CW)	LA (1xxx)			LB (2xxx)			LC (3xxx)			LD (4xxx)		
Right (CCW)	R	L (C)	C	L	L (B)	B	L	R (C)	B	R	R (B)	C
Right (CCW)	RA (5xxx)			RB (6xxx)			RC (7xxx)			RD (8xxx)		
Vee Rotation	Starter		Oil Cooler		Idler (Note: The idler is driven directly by the flywheel, and in turn, for vee engines, drives either the (L)eft or (R)ight bank camshaft. The two camshafts are meshed together so that turning one will turn the other.)		Starter		Oil Cooler		Idler	
Left (CW)	R		L		L		L		R		L	
Left (CW)	LA (1xxx)						LC (3xxx)					
Right (CCW)	R		L		R		L		R		R	
Right (CCW)	RA (5xxx)						RC (7xxx)					

=== Nomenclature ===
The first number refers to the number of cylinders in the engine, followed by a hyphen or "V", indicating inline or vee cylinder block arrangements, respectively, then 53 for the Series designation, referring the nominal swept displacement per cylinder in cubic inches, rounding from 53.07 cu in (0.9 L) per cylinder.

The basic engine code does not have a model suffix identifier: for example, 4-53 is an inline four engine. When the model number includes a suffix, it denotes additional features.

The engine model code is stamped on the cylinder block, consisting of an eight-digit code which provides additional information on the number of cylinders and basic arrangement:

Series 53 model number
5	04	5	—	1	1	01
Engine Series	Number of cylinders	Application designation		Basic engine arrangement	Design variation	Specific model number
5: Series 53	02: 2-cylinder, 106 cu in (1.7 L); 03: 3-cylinder, 159 cu in (2.6 L); 04: 4-cylinder, 212 cu in (3.5 L); 06: 6-cylinder, 318 cu in (5.2 L); 08: 8-cylinder, 424 cu in (6.9 L)	2: Marine; 3: Fan to flywheel, industrial; 4: Power-base; 5: Generator; 7: Fan to flywheel, vehicle		1: LA (left hand rotation); 2: LB (left hand rotation); 3: LC (left hand rotation); 4: LD (left hand rotation); 5: RA (right hand rotation); 6: RB (right hand rotation); 7: RC (right hand rotation); 8: RD (right hand rotation)	0: "N" engine; 1: 2-valve head; 2: 4-valve head; 3: Turbocharger	For inline engines, a value ending in an odd digit means the starter is opposite the blower; an even digit means the starter and blower are on the same side.

=== Applications ===
The 6V53 is most famously used with the M113 armored personnel carrier, starting with the M113A1 variant. The turbocharged version, 6V53T, is used in the M113A3 variant and MIM-72 Chaparral, which uses the M113 chassis. Two marinized 6V53s also were used to power the United States Coast Guard 44-foot motor lifeboats.

== Variants ==
Cylinders are numbered sequentially starting from the front of the engine. The most common Series 53 engines include the 3-53, 4-53, and 6V-53, according to production records from the 1970s and 1980s.

Selected Series 53 engine specifications
Model	Injectors	Power	Torque	CR (n:1)	L×W×H	Weight
3-53	N50	98–101 hp (73–75 kW) @2800 RPM	205 lb⋅ft (278 N⋅m) @1800 RPM	21	33×27×35 in (840×690×890 mm)	965 lb (438 kg)
3-53T	N65	131 hp (98 kW) @2500 RPM	312 lb⋅ft (423 N⋅m) @1600 RPM	18.7	33×29×40 in (840×740×1,020 mm)	1,000 lb (450 kg)
4-53	C45/C50	127–140 hp (95–104 kW) @2800 RPM	270–282 lb⋅ft (366–382 N⋅m) @1800 RPM	?	40×29×34 in (1,020×740×860 mm)	1,190 lb (540 kg)
4-53 (2V)	S45	103–108 hp (77–81 kW) @2200 RPM	263 lb⋅ft (357 N⋅m) @1500 RPM	17	39×27×37 in (990×690×940 mm)	1,110 lb (500 kg)
4-53 (4V)	S45	127–130 hp (95–97 kW) @2200 RPM	262 lb⋅ft (355 N⋅m) @1500 RPM	17	39×27×37 in (990×690×940 mm)	1,110 lb (500 kg)
4-53 (4V)	N45	127–130 hp (95–97 kW) @2200 RPM	270 lb⋅ft (370 N⋅m) @1800 RPM	21	39×27×37 in (990×690×940 mm)	1,110 lb (500 kg)
4-53	N50	136–140 hp (101–104 kW) @2800 RPM	282 lb⋅ft (382 N⋅m) @1800 RPM	21	39×27×37 in (990×690×940 mm)	1,110 lb (500 kg)
4-53 (2V)	S45	136–140 hp (101–104 kW) @2800 RPM	282 lb⋅ft (382 N⋅m) @1800 RPM	17	39×27×37 in (990×690×940 mm)	1,110 lb (500 kg)
4-53T 4-53TC	5A60	170 hp (130 kW) @2500 RPM	402 lb⋅ft (545 N⋅m) @1800 RPM	18.7	40×32×37 in (1,020×810×940 mm)	1,230 lb (560 kg)
4-53T	N65	175 hp (130 kW) @2500 RPM	420 lb⋅ft (570 N⋅m) @1600 RPM	18.7	39×30×39 in (990×760×990 mm)	1,260 lb (570 kg)
6V-53	C45/C50	197–216 hp (147–161 kW) @2800 RPM	421–440 lb⋅ft (571–597 N⋅m) @1800 RPM	?	36×35×38 in (910×890×970 mm)	1,540 lb (700 kg)
6V-53	N50	210–216 hp (157–161 kW) @2800 RPM	445 lb⋅ft (603 N⋅m) @1800 RPM	21	39×40×37 in (990×1,020×940 mm)	1,485 lb (674 kg)
6V-53N	?	160 hp (120 kW) @2400 RPM	394 lb⋅ft (534 N⋅m) @1400 RPM	21	39×40×37 in (990×1,020×940 mm)	1,485 lb (674 kg)
6V-53T	5A55	233 hp (174 kW) @2500 RPM	568 lb⋅ft (770 N⋅m) @1600 RPM	18.7	39×37×41 in (990×940×1,040 mm)	1,695 lb (769 kg)
6V-53T	?	300 hp (220 kW) @2800 RPM	666 lb⋅ft (903 N⋅m) @1600 RPM	21	39×36.5×41.3 in (990×930×1,050 mm)	1,695 lb (769 kg)

=== Inline ===
==== 2-53 ====
The firing order of the 2-53 (right-hand rotation) is 1-2.

==== 3-53 ====
Naturally aspirated 3-53 variants (model 5033-7000) had peak output ratings of 101 hp (75 kW) at 2800 RPM (gross) and 205 lb⋅ft (278 N⋅m) at 1800 RPM, with an 21:1 compression ratio, using N50 injectors. The firing order of the 3-53 is 1-2-3 (left hand) and 1-3-2 (right hand).

Turbocharged 3-53T variants (model 5033-8300) had peak output ratings of 131 hp (98 kW) at 2500 RPM (gross) and 312 lb⋅ft (423 N⋅m) at 1600 RPM, with an 18.7:1 compression ratio, using N65 injectors.

==== 4-53 ====
Naturally aspirated 4-53 variants (model 5043-7000) had peak output ratings of 140 hp (100 kW) at 2800 RPM (gross) and 282 lb⋅ft (382 N⋅m) at 1800 RPM, with an 21:1 compression ratio, using N50 injectors. With S45 injectors and the four-valve cylinder head (model 5043-7000), peak output ratings dropped slightly to 130 hp (97 kW) at 2800 RPM (gross) and 270 lb⋅ft (370 N⋅m) at 1800 RPM. The base model (with a two-valve cylinder head and reduced compression to 17:1, model 5043-5101 and -7101) had peak output ratings of 108 hp (81 kW) at 2200 RPM (gross) and 263 lb⋅ft (357 N⋅m) at 1500 RPM The firing order of the 4-53 is 1-2-4-3 (left hand) and 1-3-4-2 (right hand).

Turbocharged 4-53T variants (model 5047-5340) had peak output ratings of 170 hp (130 kW) at 2500 RPM (gross) and 402 lb⋅ft (545 N⋅m) at 1800 RPM, with an 18.7:1 compression ratio, using 5A60 injectors. Off-highway 4-53T variants (model 5043-8301) had peak output ratings of 175 hp (130 kW) at 2500 RPM (gross) and 420 lb⋅ft (570 N⋅m) at 1800 RPM, with an 18.7:1 compression ratio, using N65 injectors.

=== Vee ===
Engines with cylinder blocks arranged in a vee share the corresponding inline engine cylinder heads; for instance, a 6V-53 uses two 3-53 cylinder heads.

==== 6V-53 ====
Naturally aspirated 6V-53 variants (model 5063-7000) had peak output ratings of 216 hp (161 kW) at 2800 RPM (gross) and 445 lb⋅ft (603 N⋅m) at 1500 RPM, with an 21:1 compression ratio, using N50 injectors. The firing order of the 6V-53 is 1L-1R-2L-2R-3L-3R (left hand) and 1L-3R-3L-2R-2L-1R (right hand). The 6V-53 was available with either a cast iron or aluminum cylinder block.

Turbocharged off-highway 6V-53T variants (model 5063-5300) had peak output ratings of 233 hp (174 kW) at 2500 RPM (gross) and 568 lb⋅ft (770 N⋅m) at 1800 RPM, with an 18.7:1 compression ratio, using 5A55 injectors.

==== 8V-53 ====
The firing order of the 8V-53 is 1L-3R-3L-4R-4L-2R-2L-1R (right hand).

Horsepower: 215-320 @ 2800 rpm

Torque: 500-600 lbf-ft @ 1,600 rpm

==== 12V-53 ====
The 12V-53 is a low-production / prototype engine consisting of two coupled 6V-53 engines; fewer than 20 were estimated to have been built, mostly for marine service in generator sets. One of the 6V-53 engines was a left-hand rotation and the other was right-hand rotation; they were coupled at their flywheels.
