= Detroit Diesel Series 149 =

Series 149

Overview
- Manufacturer: Detroit Diesel division of General Motors
- Production: 1967–1999

Layout
- Configuration: V8, V12, V16, and V20
- Displacement: 12V: 1,792 cu in (29.4 L); 16V: 2,389 cu in (39.1 L); 149 cu in (2.4 L) (per cylinder)
- Cylinder bore: 5.75 in (146 mm)
- Piston stroke: 5.75 in (146 mm)
- Valvetrain: Overhead camshaft
- Compression ratio: 17.0:1 (N/A & Turbo); 16.0:1 (Intercooled)

Combustion
- Supercharger: Roots-type (some versions)
- Turbocharger: With intercooler
- Fuel type: Diesel
- Cooling system: Water-cooled

Output
- Power output: 600–2,936 hp (447–2,189 kW)
- Torque output: 2,310–7,350 lb⋅ft (3,132–9,965 N⋅m)

Dimensions
- Length: 91–109 in (2,311.4–2,768.6 mm)
- Width: 54–64 in (1,371.6–1,625.6 mm)
- Height: 66–72 in (1,676.4–1,828.8 mm)
- Dry weight: 8,600–10,860 lb (3,901–4,926 kg)

The Detroit Diesel 149 is a series of two-stroke diesel engines manufactured by Detroit Diesel which were first announced in early 1966. After Detroit Diesel was spun off in 1988 and later acquired by MTU, production of Series 149 engines was discontinued around 2000.

== Development ==
The first configuration was announced at the 50th anniversary SAE Tractor meeting. It was a naturally aspirated 12V149 rated at about 600 hp (447 kW) soon followed by a naturally aspirated 16V149 rated at about 1,000 hp (746 kW). As manufacturers in the marine, construction, mining, and many other industries required more power output, Detroit added turbocharging and intercooling to the engine.

As originally designed, the Oliver Hazard Perry-class frigates were equipped with 16V-149TI diesels for electrical generation, but these were replaced starting in 2000 after the Series 149 went out of production. In 1992, Republic Locomotive announced a new line of locomotives powered by Series 149 engines intended for switching and commuter service.

Over a period of time, Detroit Diesel continued to further evolve the design of the engine. They finally brought the engine up to 137.5 hp (102.5 kW) per cylinder and 406 lb⋅ft (550 N⋅m) torque per cylinder, a considerable amount of power coming from a displacement of 149 cu in (2.4 L) per cylinder. Much of this increase in power could be attributed to DDEC III (the third generation of Detroit Diesel Electronic Controls) electronics, thermal barrier (ceramic) coating of piston domes and fire deck, valve-controlled bypass blowers and Separate Circuit Charge Cooling (SCCC) system.

== Design ==
One of the unique features of the 149 engine is its bore and stroke 5.75-by-5.75-inch (146 mm × 146 mm); hence, it is known as a square bore design. It has a relatively high power-to-weight ratio. The 20V149 TIB DDEC III SCCC in stand-by generator spec has an output of 2,936 hp (2,189 kW) from a capacity of 2,980 cu in (48.8 L).

All Series 149 engines have overhead camshafts and the cylinder heads fit into the engine block; this is referred to as the "pothead" design. The blowers are also recessed into the block; this section of the block is called the "airbox". Above the blower is a thick piece of steel that covers the blower and seals the top section of the air box. On a turbocharged engine an intercooler and sometimes a by-pass housing is present with the intercooler housing.

=== Nomenclature ===
The engine is available in V-8, V-12, V-16, and V-20 configurations; using the alphanumeric nomenclature utilized by Detroit Diesel, these engines were known as the 8V149, 12V149, 16V149, and 20V149, respectively. The first number indicates the number of cylinders per engine, the "V" indicates a V-type cylinder arrangement, and the last set of numbers indicates the series of the engine. Suffixes are commonplace with Detroit Diesel model designations: "T" means the engine is equipped with turbochargers, "I" for intercoolers, and "B" for by-pass Roots-type blowers. For example, the 20V149 TIB has 20 cylinders in a V-type configuration, is a Series 149 engine, and is turbocharged, intercooled, and has by-pass blowers.

Series 149 specifications for selected models
Family	Model	Torque	Power	Length × Width × Height	Weight
12V-149	12V-149	2,310 lb⋅ft (3,132 N⋅m) @ 1500 rpm	675 hp (503 kW) @ 1800 rpm	92 in × 57 in × 67 in 2,300 mm × 1,400 mm × 1,700 mm	8,880 lb 4,030 kg
12V-149	12V-149T	2,915 lb⋅ft (3,952 N⋅m) @ 1500 rpm	1,000 hp (746 kW) @ 1800 rpm	91 in × 63 in × 69 in 2,300 mm × 1,600 mm × 1,800 mm	9,095 lb 4,125 kg
12V-149	12V-149TI	3,445 lb⋅ft (4,671 N⋅m) @ 1500 rpm	1,200 hp (895 kW) @ 1800 rpm	91 in × 64 in × 69 in 2,300 mm × 1,600 mm × 1,800 mm	8,600 lb 3,900 kg
16V-149	16V-149	3,080 lb⋅ft (4,176 N⋅m) @ 1500 rpm	1,060 hp (790 kW) @ 1800 rpm	108 in × 54 in × 68 in 2,700 mm × 1,400 mm × 1,700 mm	10,540 lb 4,780 kg
16V-149	16V-149T	3,880 lb⋅ft (5,261 N⋅m) @ 1400 rpm	1,325 hp (988 kW) @ 1900 rpm	109 in × 64 in × 72 in 2,800 mm × 1,600 mm × 1,800 mm	10,840 lb 4,920 kg
16V-149	16V-149TI	4,595 lb⋅ft (6,230 N⋅m) @ 1500 rpm	1,600 hp (1,193 kW) @ 1800 rpm	104 in × 64 in × 66 in 2,600 mm × 1,600 mm × 1,700 mm	10,860 lb 4,930 kg

=== Specific models ===
The 12V and 16V configurations have two blocks, two crankshafts bolted together, two blowers, and four turbos. The 16V149 has dual 10-inch (250 mm) exhaust outlets with eight bolt flanges.

The 20V configuration was mainly designed for haul trucks. Detroit could push the envelope of the 16V (in the marine version it could produce 2,400 hp (1,790 kW) @ 2100 RPM) but it would require special parts. They wanted 2,500 hp (1,864 kW) with standard production parts, so the 20V149 was born. It has 3 engine blocks, 3 crankshafts bolted together. The unique set up of the 20V has a 6V block on either end of a special 8V block with 6 turbos, 3 blowers and intercoolers.

== End of production ==
Production of Series 149 engines was phased out by mid-1999 and MTU Friedrichshafen's 4000 series of four-stroke diesel engines was proposed as helping to fill the void left by the cessation of the 149 Series production. Detroit Diesel and MTU jointly developed the 2000 and 4000 series, with Detroit Diesel leading development of the 2000 and MTU leading the 4000, each of which are named for the per-cylinder displacement in cm^{3}. Like the Series 149, the 4000 comes in 8V-, 12V-, 16V-, and 20V- configurations. Remanufactured Series 149 long blocks are available for off-highway use.
