= Schnuerle porting =

Cylinder design in two-stroke engines

Cylinder and ports, viewed from above

Schnuerle porting is a system to improve efficiency of a valveless two-stroke engine by giving better scavenging. The intake and exhaust ports cut in the cylinder wall are shaped to give a more efficient transfer of intake and exhaust gases.

== Description ==
Cylinder scavenging, from the side

Gas flow within the two-stroke engine is even more critical than for a four-stroke engine, as the exhaust flow exits the chamber as the intake enters simultaneously. A well-defined flow pattern is required, avoiding any turbulent mixing. The efficiency of the two-stroke engine depends on effective scavenging, the more complete replacement of the old spent charge with a fresh charge.

Apart from large diesels with separate superchargers, two-stroke engines are generally piston-ported and use their crankcase beneath the piston for compression. The cylinder has a transfer port (inlet from crankcase to cylinder) and an exhaust port cut into it. These are opened as the piston moves downwards past them; with the higher exhaust port opening earlier as the piston descends; and closing later as the piston rises.

The simplest arrangement is a single transfer and single exhaust port, opposite each other. This "cross scavenging" performs poorly, as there is tendency for the flow to pass from the inlet directly to the exhaust, wasting some of the fuel mixture and also poorly scavenging the upper part of the chamber. Before Schnuerle porting, a deflector on top of the piston was used to direct the gas flow from the transfer port upwards, in a U-shaped loop around the combustion chamber roof and then down and out through the exhaust port. Apart from the gas flow never quite following this ideal path and tending to mix instead, this also gave a poorly shaped combustion chamber with long, thin flame paths.

In 1926, the German engineer Adolf Schnürle developed the system of ports that bears his name. The ports were relocated to both be on the same side of the cylinder, with the transfer port being split into two angled ports, one on either side of the exhaust port. A deflector piston was no longer required. The gas flow was now a circular loop, flowing in and across the piston crown from the transfer ports, up and around the combustion chamber and then out through the exhaust port.

In small model engines with Schnuerle porting, a third transfer port is typically added, known as a boost port.

With Schnuerle porting, the piston crown may be of any shape, even bowl shaped. This permits a far better combustion chamber shape and flame path, giving better combustion, particularly at high speeds.

== Loop scavenging ==
As Schnuerle porting encourages flow in a loop, it is termed "loop scavenging".

Historically, the deflector piston form of cross scavenging was termed "loop scavenging", after the supposed shape of the flow. Schnuerle flow was termed "reverse loop scavenging". As the first of these was realised to be inaccurate, the later form adopted the simpler name. These original terms are now obsolete and no longer used.

== Adolf Schnürle ==
The system is named after its inventor, Adolf Schnürle. Either "Schnürle" or the more common Anglicisation as "Schnuerle" are generally acceptable. It also appears as "Schnürrle", but "Schneurle" is a misspelling.

Adolf Schnürle was a prolific engineer and is named on many patent documents.
