= Detroit Diesel =

American diesel engine manufacturer

Detroit Diesel Corporation
- Type: Subsidiary
- Industry: Automotive
- Predecessor: General Motors Detroit Diesel-Allison Division
- Founded: 1938; 88 years ago
- Headquarters: Detroit, Michigan, United States
- Products: Heavy-duty diesel engines
- Owner: Daimler Truck AG (as of 2000)
- Number of employees: 2,300
- Parent: Daimler Truck North America
- Website: www.demanddetroit.com

Detroit Diesel Corporation (DDC) is an American diesel engine manufacturer headquartered in Detroit, Michigan. It is a subsidiary of Daimler Truck North America, which is itself a wholly owned subsidiary of the multinational Daimler Truck AG. The company manufactures heavy-duty engines and chassis components for the on-highway and vocational commercial truck markets. Detroit Diesel has built more than 5 million engines since 1938, more than 1 million of which are still in operation worldwide. Detroit Diesel's product line includes engines, axles, transmissions, and a Virtual Technician service.

Detroit engines, transmissions, and axles are used in several models of truck manufactured by Daimler Truck North America.

== Divisions ==
Detroit Diesel consists of manufacturing operations of axles, transmissions and diesel engines for on-highway only, which is owned by Daimler Truck AG. The former off-highway division was sold to MTU Friedrichshafen in 2006 and subsequently purchased by Rolls-Royce in 2014.

== Detroit Diesel Corporation timeline ==
The predecessor of Detroit Diesel was the Winton Engine Company, founded by Alexander Winton in 1912; Winton Engine began producing diesel engines in fall 1913. After Charles F. Kettering purchased two Winton diesels for his yacht, General Motors acquired the company in 1930 along with Electro Motive Company, Winton's primary client. Research initiated by Kettering led to the development and release of the EMD 567 locomotive engine in the late 1930s; a smaller engine using a similar two-stroke design was developed by engineers at GM Research, which led to the first 6-71, manufactured in 1938.

=== Origins ===
- January 1938: General Motors began diesel engine manufacturing in Detroit under the Detroit Diesel Engine Division, and re-organized its Winton Engine Corporation as the Cleveland Diesel Engine Division. Cleveland Diesel produced larger diesel engines for locomotive, marine, and stationary use. Detroit Diesel started production with the smaller mobile Series 71 two-cycle engines that the GM Research Division had recently developed. GM formed the General Motors Diesel Division (GMDD) as a marketing and customer service structure for its Detroit and Cleveland diesel products.
- 1939: Series 71 engines installed in buses manufactured by Yellow Coach (acquired by GM in 1943).
- World War II: Tanks, landing craft, road building equipment and standby generators needed compact, lightweight, two-cycle engines. By 1943, Detroit Diesel employed 4,300 people, more than 1,400 of them women. Together, these employees produced 57,892 engines in 1943. Detroit Diesel launches Series 110 engines used in construction equipment, rail cars, and power generation.
- 1945: Detroit Diesel Engine Division begins marketing the Series 71 for marine applications, taking over from the Gray Marine Motor Company, which had been assembling marinized versions since 1938.

=== Postwar expansion ===
- 1950s: Wide use of GM's Detroit Diesel engines in military applications aided their acceptance in commercial applications. Detroit Diesel developed heavy-duty engines for long-distance trucks. GMDD began to develop a worldwide distribution network of independent, authorized distributors and dealers to provide parts and service for Detroit and Cleveland Diesel products.
- 1957: Detroit Diesel introduced the Series 53 engine, and put the Series 71 engine into use for both on-highway and off-road use. All engines within a Series were designed so that a vast majority of parts were interchangeable, facilitating production of many models of various horsepower by adding cylinders.
- 1960 and after: For the next 20 years, the Detroit Diesel and Allison Divisions grew, tripling sales during the 1960s alone. In 1963, Detroit Diesel marked a milestone after the collective horsepower produced by its engines to-date had reached 100 million; by 1967, DD had produced engines producing a collective 150 million horsepower.
- 1962: Production and marketing of remaining Cleveland Diesel products moved to GM's Electro-Motive Division, leaving Detroit Diesel Engine Division the remaining partner of GMDD.
- 1965: GMDD structures absorbed into the Detroit Diesel Engine Division, formally ending GMDD as a separate entity. Detroit Diesel introduces the Series 149 engine for use in workboats, push boats, and 100 ton-plus mining trucks.
- 1970: General Motors consolidated Detroit Diesel with the closely allied transmission and Whirlfire-branded gas turbine businesses of the Allison Division, forming the Detroit Diesel-Allison Division.
- 1974: The Series 92 engine was introduced, called the Fuel Squeezers; the 6V-92TT engine achieved fuel savings of 10% to 20% over previous models of comparable horsepower. During the energy crisis, turbine engines became uncompetitive.

=== Shift to four-cycle engines and spinoff ===
- 1980: Detroit Diesel-Allison produced its first four-cycle engine. A few years later in the early 1980s diesel engine production split off as Detroit Diesel Division while turbine engines remained as Allison Division.
- 1987: The Series 60 — the four-cycle heavy-duty engine for which the company is well known — was introduced. It was the first production engine to have integrated electronic controls as a standard feature. The Series 60 was cleaner and more fuel-efficient than previous heavy-duty engines, and became the biggest selling heavy-duty diesel engine in the North American Class 8 truck market.
- 1988 January 1: A joint venture between Penske Corporation and General Motors created Detroit Diesel Corporation. Penske had a 60% majority ownership in the new venture and the CEO was former racecar driver Roger Penske.
- 1993 October: Detroit Diesel Corporation had grown its on-highway heavy-duty market share to 33% from 3% only a few years earlier. The company also made an initial public offering of common stock, becoming a publicly traded company listed on the New York Stock Exchange under the stock symbol "DDC". That same year, Detroit Diesel launched the Series 50, the first Detroit Diesel natural gas engine.
- 1999: Detroit Diesel built its 4 millionth engine.

=== DaimlerChrysler ===
- 2000: In October 2000, DaimlerChrysler bought Detroit Diesel Corporation.
- 2000: Off-highway engines combined with MTU Friedrichshafen to form MTU America. The on-highway division of Detroit Diesel was retained by DaimlerChrysler (now Daimler AG) as part of Daimler Trucks North America (DTNA).
- 2005: Detroit Diesel Corporation invested $350 million to refurbish and retool its plant for future business.
- 2006: MTU Friedrichshafen, including the off-highway part of Detroit Diesel in the US, was acquired by the EQT AB investment group. A new company, Tognum GmbH, was formed as a holding company for the brands held by Daimler Trucks and MTU Friedrichshafen. Both companies use the 'Detroit Diesel' name and corporate logo.
- 2007: Detroit Diesel Corporation launches its DD engine platform with the DD15 Engine.
- 2008: Detroit Diesel Corporation was recognized for its Brownfield Redevelopment efforts, and also won the national EPA Phoenix Award for its plant.
- 2009: The 1 millionth Series 60 engine was sold.
- 2010: An additional $190 million investment allowed Detroit Diesel Corporation to launch Blue Tec emissions technology and the final engine of its new engines family: the Detroit DD platform of engines that includes the DD13, DD15, DD15TC, and DD16 engines.
- 2010: Detroit began production of EPA 2010 certified engines.
- 2011: Detroit Diesel Corporation is named one of the two 2011 Michigan Green Leaders in the Big Business category by the Detroit Free Press. DDC changes brand name from Detroit Diesel to Detroit.
- 2012: 100,000th DD platform engine built. DD axles, Virtual Technician, DT12 automated manual transmission and Detroit Genuine Parts are introduced.
- 2013: 75th anniversary.
- 2016: Detroit Diesel agreed to pay U.S.$28.5 million to resolve violations of US federal Clean Air Act. The company sold 7,786 heavy-duty diesel engines, which were assembled approximately 80% complete in 2009, including the crankshaft, block, pistons, and connecting rods. These short block engines were stored temporarily, and the remaining assembly work was completed in early 2010 for use in trucks and buses of in model year 2010. These engines were alleged not to comply with stricter 2010 emission standards. The company believed its practice was allowed under EPA regulations.

== Products ==
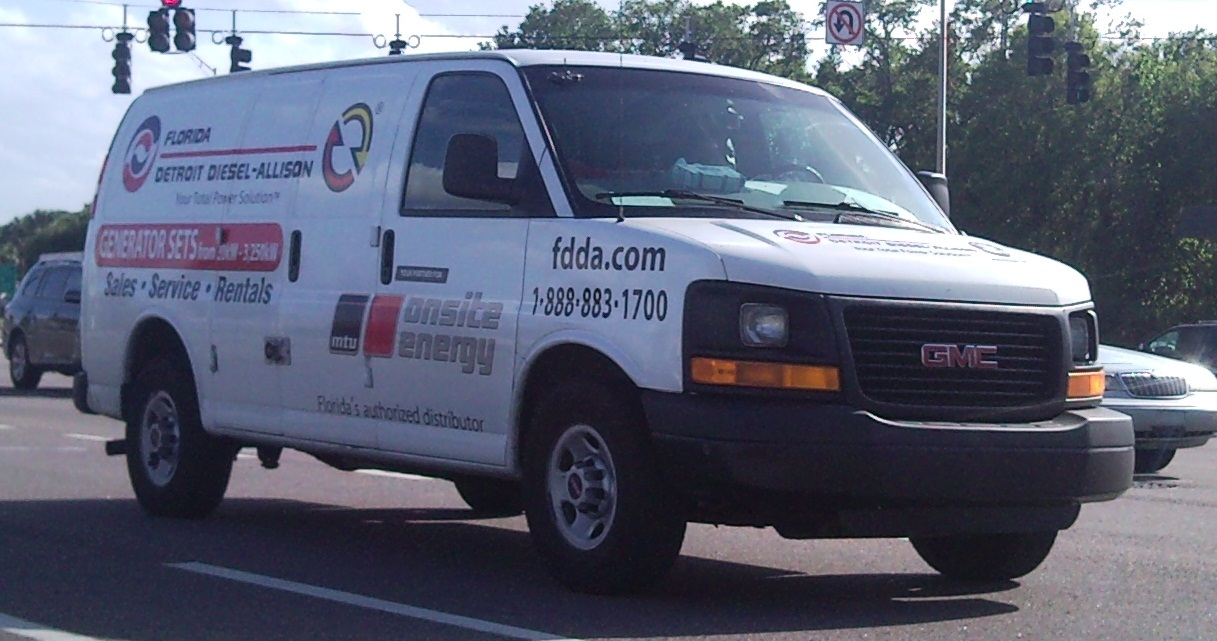
A GMC Savana with the company's logo.

=== Current products ===
- DD5: A 5.1 L (311 cu in) I4 developing 210–240 hp (157–179 kW) and 575–660 lbf⋅ft (780–895 N⋅m).
- DD8: A 7.7 L (470 cu in) I6 developing 260–350 hp (194–261 kW) and 660–1,050 lbf⋅ft (895–1,424 N⋅m).
- DD13: A 12.8 L (781 cu in) I6 developing 350–505 hp (261–377 kW) and 1,250–1,850 lbf⋅ft (1,695–2,508 N⋅m).
- DD15: A 14.8 L (903 cu in) I6 developing 455–505 hp (339–377 kW) and 1,550–1,750 lbf⋅ft (2,102–2,373 N⋅m).
- DD16: A 15.6 L (952 cu in) I6 developing 475–600 hp (354–447 kW) and 1,850–2,050 lbf⋅ft (2,508–2,779 N⋅m).
- Front Steer Axles: Ratings up to 20,000 lb (9,100 kg)
- Single Rear Axles: Ratings up to 23,000 lb (10,000 kg)
- Tandem Rear Axles: Ratings up to 46,000 lb (21,000 kg)
- DT12 Transmissions: An HD 12 speed automatic

=== Services ===
- Detroit Reman
- Virtual Technician

=== Engines still supported ===
- Series 50: A 8.5 L (519 cu in) I4 developing 250–350 hp (186–261 kW) and 1,250–1,650 lbf⋅ft (1,695–2,237 N⋅m).
- Series 60: A 11.1 L (677 cu in), 12.7 L (775 cu in), or 14 L (854 cu in) I6 developing 400–665 hp (298–496 kW).
- Mercedes-Benz Engine (MBE) 900: A 7.2 L (439 cu in) I6 developing 350 hp (261 kW) and 860 lbf⋅ft (1,166 N⋅m).
- Mercedes-Benz Engine (MBE) 4000: A 12.8 L (781 cu in), I6 developing 350–450 hp (261–336 kW) and 1,350–1,550 lbf⋅ft (1,830–2,102 N⋅m).
- DD15TC
- Series 40

=== Related engine series ===
- Series 40E (rebranded International DT/MaxxForce engines)
- Series 51
- Series 53
- Series 55
- Series 71
- Series 92
- Series 110
- Series 149
- Series 638 (rebranded VM Motori 638)
- Series 700
- Series 2000
- Series 4000
- Series SUN
- 8.2 Liter "Fuel Pincher"
- 6.2 Liter
- 6.5 Liter

To know the series model one can find out by checking the layout of the overall engine.

=== Engine model number ===
Detroit Diesel engine model description chart
8	08	3	-	7	0	00
Model designator	Number of cylinders	Application designation		Basic engine arrangement and drive shaft rotation or Displacement (Note: Series 60 only)	Design variation or Engine Control	Specific model number or customer configuration
1 = Series 71, inline arrangement		2 = Marine		1 = LA (left hand rotation, (Note: As viewed from the front of the engine) exhaust & balance shaft to the left, (Note: Inline Series 71 & Series 53) or starter on left bank (Note: Vee Series 53, Series 71, and Series 92 engines))	0 = 4 valve head "N" engine	
5 = Series 53, inline or vee arrangement		3 = Industrial F-F (Note: "Fan to Flywheel")		2 = LB (left hand rotation, exhaust & balance shaft to the right, starter on right bank)	1 = 2 valve head	
6 = Series 60		4 = Power Base		3 = LC (left hand rotation, exhaust & balance shaft to the left, starter on right bank)	2 = 4 valve head "E" engine	
7 = Series 71, vee arrangement		5 = Generator		4 = LD (left hand rotation, exhaust & balance shaft to the right, starter on left bank)	3 = Turbocharged	
8 = Series 92, vee arrangement		7 = Vehicle F-F		5 = RA (right hand rotation, exhaust & balance shaft to the left, starter on right bank)	4 = Aftercooled	
9 = Series 149		8 = Vehicle F-F		6 = RB (right hand rotation, exhaust & balance shaft to the right, starter on right bank)	5 = Customer special engine	
T = Series 4000				7 = RC (right hand rotation, exhaust & balance shaft to the left, starter on right bank)	6 = Constant horsepower, economy (TAE, California Certified)	
				8 = RD (right hand rotation, exhaust & balance shaft to the right, starter on left bank)	7 = Constant horsepower (TT)	
					8 = Constant horsepower (TTA, California & Federal Certified)	
9 = Constant horsepower, economy (TTAE, California & Federal Certified)

== Joint ventures ==
- 50/50 Joint Venture with Bosch LLC- Detroit North America Fuel Systems Remanufacturing

== Partners ==
- Daimler Truck North America, Detroit Diesel Corporation's parent company, and Walmart collaborated to build the first-ever hybrid electric Freightliner Cascadia in 2010.

== Clean Air Act violations ==
In 1998, the EPA announced fines totaling $83.4 million against Detroit Diesel and six other diesel engine manufacturers, the largest fine to date, which evaded testing by shutting down emissions controls during highway driving while appearing to comply with lab testing. The manufacturers also agreed to spend more than $1 billion to correct the problem. The trucks used engine ECU software to engage pollution controls during the 20-minute lab tests to verify compliance with the Clean Air Act, but then disable the emissions controls during normal highway cruising, emitting up to three times the maximum allowed NOx pollution.

In 2016, Detroit Diesel agreed to pay U.S.$28.5 million to resolve violations of the U.S. federal Clean Air Act. The company sold 7,786 heavy-duty diesel engines, which were assembled approximately 80% complete in 2009, including the crankshaft, block, pistons, and connecting rods, the short block engines were stored temporarily and completed the remaining assembly in early 2010 for use in trucks and buses of in model year 2010. These engines were alleged not to comply with stricter 2010 emission standards.

== See also ==
- Stewart & Stevenson
