= MZ 125 SX/SM =

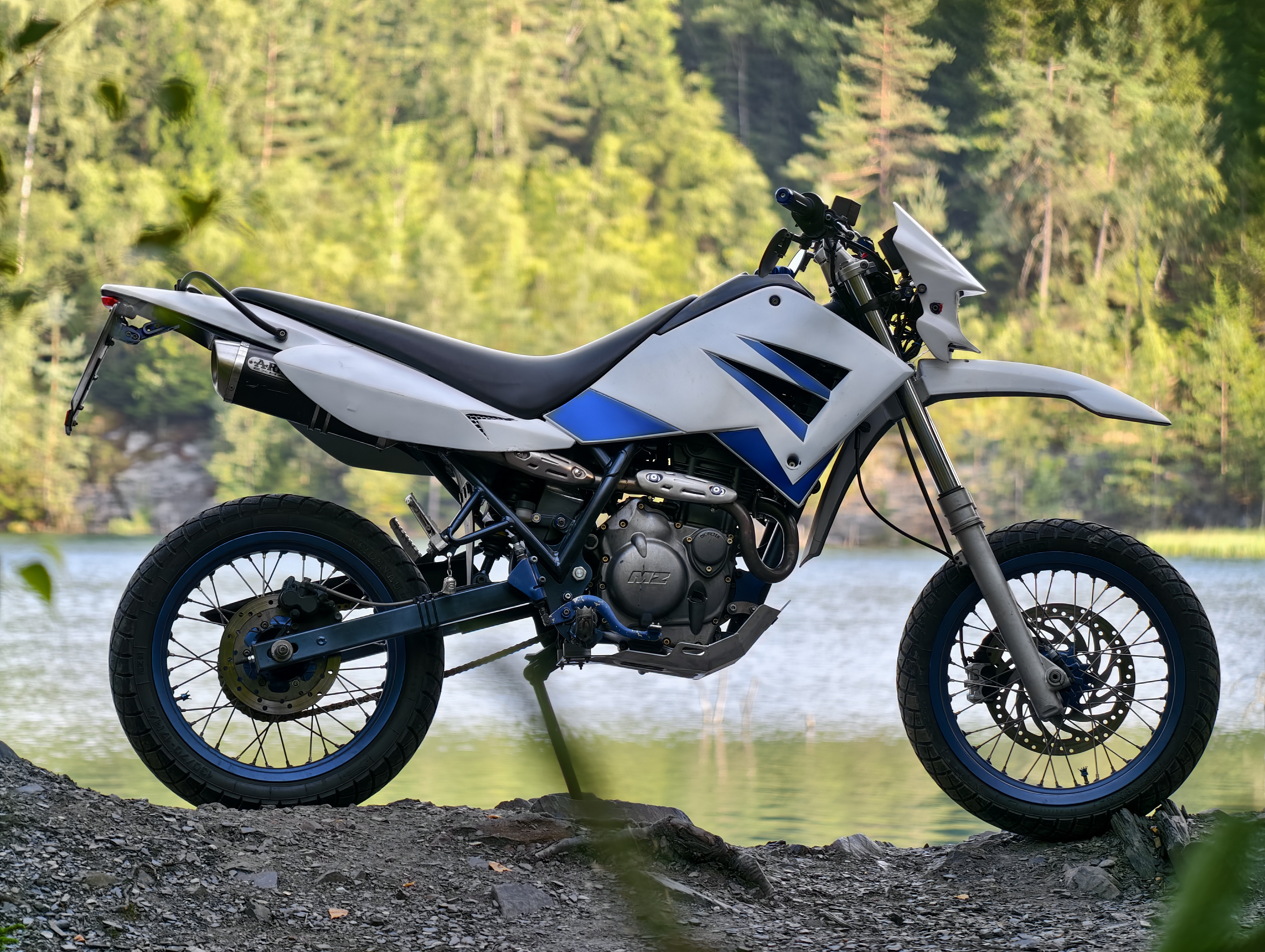
- Manufacturer: MZ Motorrad- und Zweiradwerk GmbH
- Production: 2001−2008
- Engine: → see table

MZ 125 SX and MZ 125 SM are model designations for motorcycles manufactured by the MZ Motorrad- und Zweiradwerk GmbH in Zschopau from 2001 to 2008. Designed by Peter Naumann, both machines were technically based on the MZ RT 125 road bike, which had been released a year earlier; the SM was derived from the SX.

== History and technical details ==
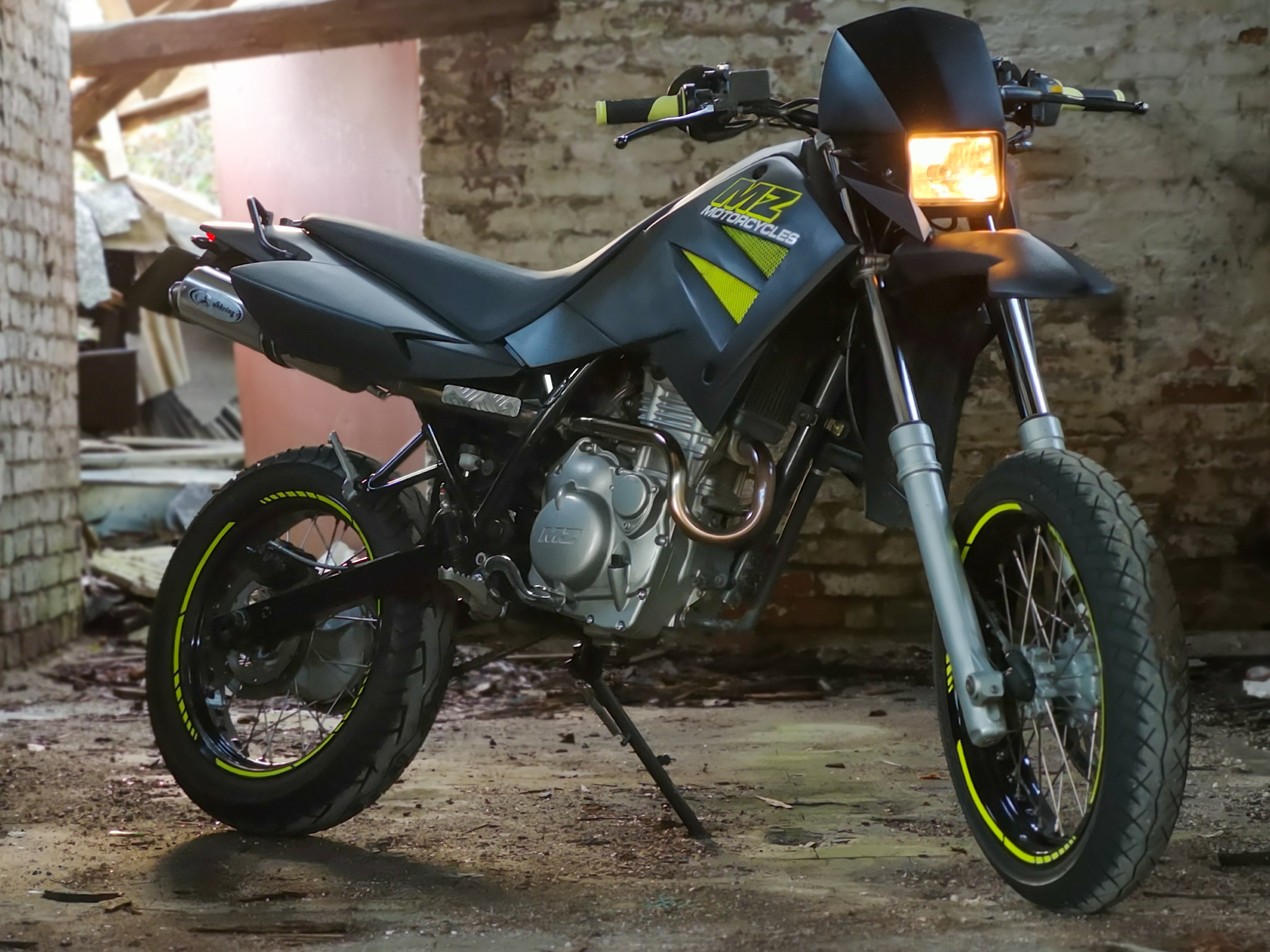
MZ SM 125

The 125 SX is a lightweight enduro motorcycle, while the 125 SM is a lightweight supermoto and differs from the SX primarily in its 17-inch wheels, a correspondingly longer final drive ratio, and a seat height that is 30 millimeters lower. Additionally, the plastic parts on the 125 SM are painted rather than colored throughout.

One year after the start of production, in 2002, the factory launched the "MZ Youngster Cup" for young riders aged 12 and up, which was held as part of the International German Supermoto Championship. The factory-offered cup version of the 125 SM featured a Wilbers Products shock absorber, stiffer Wilbers springs in the telescopic fork, and a Sebring sport exhaust system.

In the years 2002 to 2008, the models ranked among the 10 most popular light motorcycles in terms of new registrations in Germany, despite low and declining sales figures.

== Specifications ==
	MZ 125 SX	MZ 125 SM
image	MZ 125 SX	MZ 125 SM
Production	2000–2008	
Engine	liquid-cooled single cylinder four-stroke engine, electric start	
Valvetrain	Dual overhead camshaft (DOHC), 4 valves	
Bore × Stroke	60 mm × 44 mm (2.4 in × 1.7 in)	
Displacement	124.4 cc (7.59 cu in)	
Compression ratio	11.2 : 1	
Power rating	15 PS (11 kW) at 9000/min	
max. Torque	11.7 N⋅m (8.6 lbf⋅ft) at 8500/min	
Introduction of fuel	carburetor (Mikuni VM 24)	
Lubrication	forced lubrication	
Ignition system	contactless capacitor ignition	
Alternator	Alternating current generator, 180 W	
Battery	12 V – 9 Ah	
On-board voltage	12 V	
Clutch	multi-disk clutch in oil bath, mechanically operated	
Transmission	6-speed helical gearbox, claw-switched	
Frame	single cradle steel frame	
Dimension (L × W × H)	2,185 mm × 700 mm × 1,200 mm (86.0 in × 27.6 in × 47.2 in)	2,010 mm × 700 mm × 1,160 mm (79 in × 28 in × 46 in)
Wheelbase	1,440 mm (57 in)	
Seat height	860 mm (34 in)	830 mm (33 in)
Front suspension	telescopic fork, hydraulically damped suspension 130 mm (5.1 in)	
Rear suspension	swingarm, suspension 200 mm (7.9 in), adjustable spring base	
Front rim size	wire-spoke wheel, 1.85 x 21″	wire-spoke wheel, 2.75 x 17″
Rear rim size	wire-spoke wheel, 2.5 x 18″	wire-spoke wheel, 4.00 x 17″
Front tire	90/90-21	110/70-17
Rear tire	120/80-18	130/70-17
Front brake	single-disc brake, Ø 280 mm (11 in), dual piston	
Rear brake	single-disc brake, Ø 220 mm (8.7 in), dual piston	
Curb weight	127.5 kg (281 lb)	129.5 kg (285 lb)
Maximum load	320 kg (710 lb)	
Fuel capacity	12.5 l (reserve: 3.6 l)	

== Special models ==
The 125 SM remained largely unchanged throughout its production run, but numerous special editions were released, each with different paint schemes or decals. These included the "TWIN COLOUR," "GANGSTA," "MIG," and "CUP REPLICA" models. The latter was inspired by the MZ Youngster Cup and featured different handlebars. The "MIG" and "CUP REPLICA" models were equipped with engine guards and hand protectors, unlike the standard version.

In addition, there was the special edition model "SIX DAYS '87", limited to 87 units, with a green painted frame, white plastic fairing parts and red foil, inspired by the livery of the MZ factory enduros at the 1987 62nd International Six Days Enduro. They were also equipped with engine guards and hand protectors.

For the US market, there was a limited-edition version, the Fun X, as a single-seater, without turn signals and headlights.

In 2004, the French Armed Forces ordered 502 units. The motorcycles were delivered in black and are additionally equipped with handguards, a top case, a tank bag, and enhanced engine protection.
