= MZ 1000S =

Parallel twin motorcycle

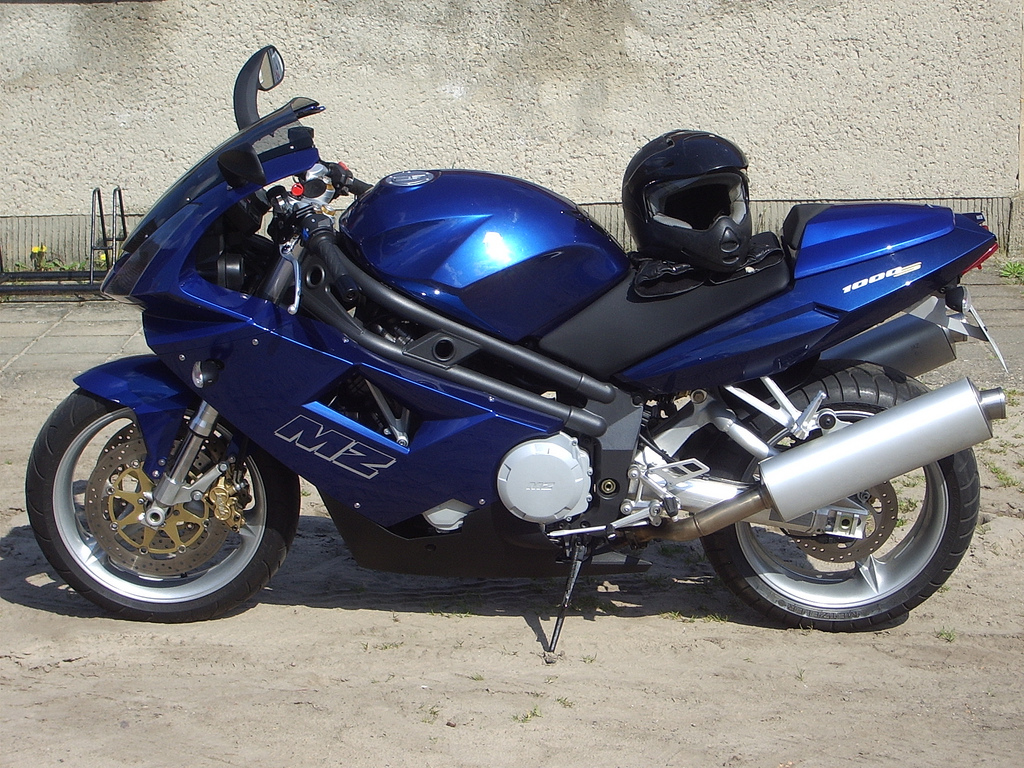
- Manufacturer: MZ Motorrad
- Production: 2004–2007
- Class: Sport bike Sport-touring
- Engine: 998 cc (60.9 cu in) parallel twin
- Bore / stroke: 96 mm × 69 mm (3.8 in × 2.7 in)
- Compression ratio: 12.5:1
- Top speed: 140 mph (230 km/h)
- Power: 87 kW (117 hp) at 9000 RPM
- Torque: 72 lb⋅ft (98 N⋅m)
- Transmission: wet multi-plate hydraulic clutch 6-speed cassette gearbox chain final drive R/H side
- Frame type: Chrome-moly tubular steel Twin-beam
- Suspension: Front: 43 mm Marzocchi inverted telescopic forks, fully adjustable Rear: Alloy cantilever swingarm, Sachs shock, fully adjustable
- Brakes: Front: 2 x 320 mm disc, 4-piston caliper Rear: 240 mm disc, 2-piston caliper
- Tires: Front: 120/70-17; Rear: 180/55-17
- Rake, trail: 24.5°, 98 mm (3.9 in)
- Wheelbase: 56.1 in (1,420 mm)
- Seat height: 820 mm (32.3 in)
- Weight: 513 lb (233 kg) (wet)
- Fuel capacity: 20 L; 4.3 imp gal (5.2 US gal)
- Fuel consumption: 5.9 L/100 km; 48 mpg_{‑imp} (40 mpg_{‑US})

MZ 1000S is a 998 cc 180-degree parallel twin motorcycle produced between 2004 and 2007 released in the US in 2005 by the now defunct German company MZ Motorrad. Once the flagship of the range, the 1000S was MZ's largest-ever displacement motorcycle, and their first multi-cylinder bike since 1959. The MZ 1000S was the most powerful production inline twin cylinder engine worldwide.

== Company history ==
In the Communist era, the East German firm MZ Motorrad produced only single-cylinder, small-displacement motorcycles. These were mostly rugged 2-stroke commuters, from which MZ developed successful 250 cc ISDT machines. MZ were then world leaders in 2-stroke design, but chief engineer and rider Ernst Degner defected to the West, selling MZ technical know-how to Suzuki. After the fall of the Berlin Wall in 1989, MZ had access to Western designers and resources, and they hoped to move into a more sophisticated market. In 1994 the factory produced the Skorpion range. Conceived by British design firm Seymour Powell, it used a 660 cc Yamaha single-cylinder engine. The Skorpion was followed in 2001 by the Baghira motard, which also used the Yamaha engine. Later, after being taken over by Hong Leong Group of Malaysia, MZ began a project to produce its own 1000 cc superbike, but MZ stopped all production in 2013.

== Development history ==
The 1000S "New Edge" design was drawn by Peter Naumann who designed the F-117 Stealth Fighter, and the 1000S won a silver medal from International Design Forum. Initial reports were that this would have a V-twin engine, but MZ eventually opted for a parallel-twin instead with a 180° crank. The frame is a twin-spar design, not unlike that of the Aprilia Falco; but whereas the Falco has an alloy frame, the MZ used chrome-moly steel. The prototype model of the 1000S was previewed during Intermot 2000 in Germany and went into production in 2003. The bike initially sold well, particularly in Germany. MZ, who had grand plans to become a major world manufacturer, went on to produce some variants of the 1000S such as the MZ 1000SF naked bike and MZ 1000ST sports touring bike. Financial troubles set in and the MZ factory was closed.

== Model range ==
=== MZ 1000S ===
Although the S model is a sport bike with clip-ons and rear-set footrests, the bike is nevertheless comfortable and capable of touring with a pillion passenger. Its engine is a liquid-cooled 999 cc DOHC 8-valve 4-stroke 40° inclined parallel twin with a 180° crankshaft, and a balance shaft. It has electronic fuel injection, and wet-sump lubrication. It has Nissin brakes, Marzocchi male-slider forks, and an alloy cantilever swingarm rear suspension. Although the engine is compact, the bike is fairly heavy at 208 kg (dry).

=== MZ 1000ST ===
The ST is a milder sports-tourer motorcycle based on the "S". The engine is detuned for more torque but still produces 83 kW (111 hp). Compared to the "S", the ST is modified for touring comfort, with higher handlebars and lower footrests to provide a roomier seating position for long-distance riding. The screen is 30 mm higher for better wind protection. A plusher rear seat provides more comfort for the pillion. The ST's engine has altered clutch springs to reduce the effort required to operate the clutch. Krauser hard luggage may be fitted, and a steering damper keeps the bike stable when fully loaded.

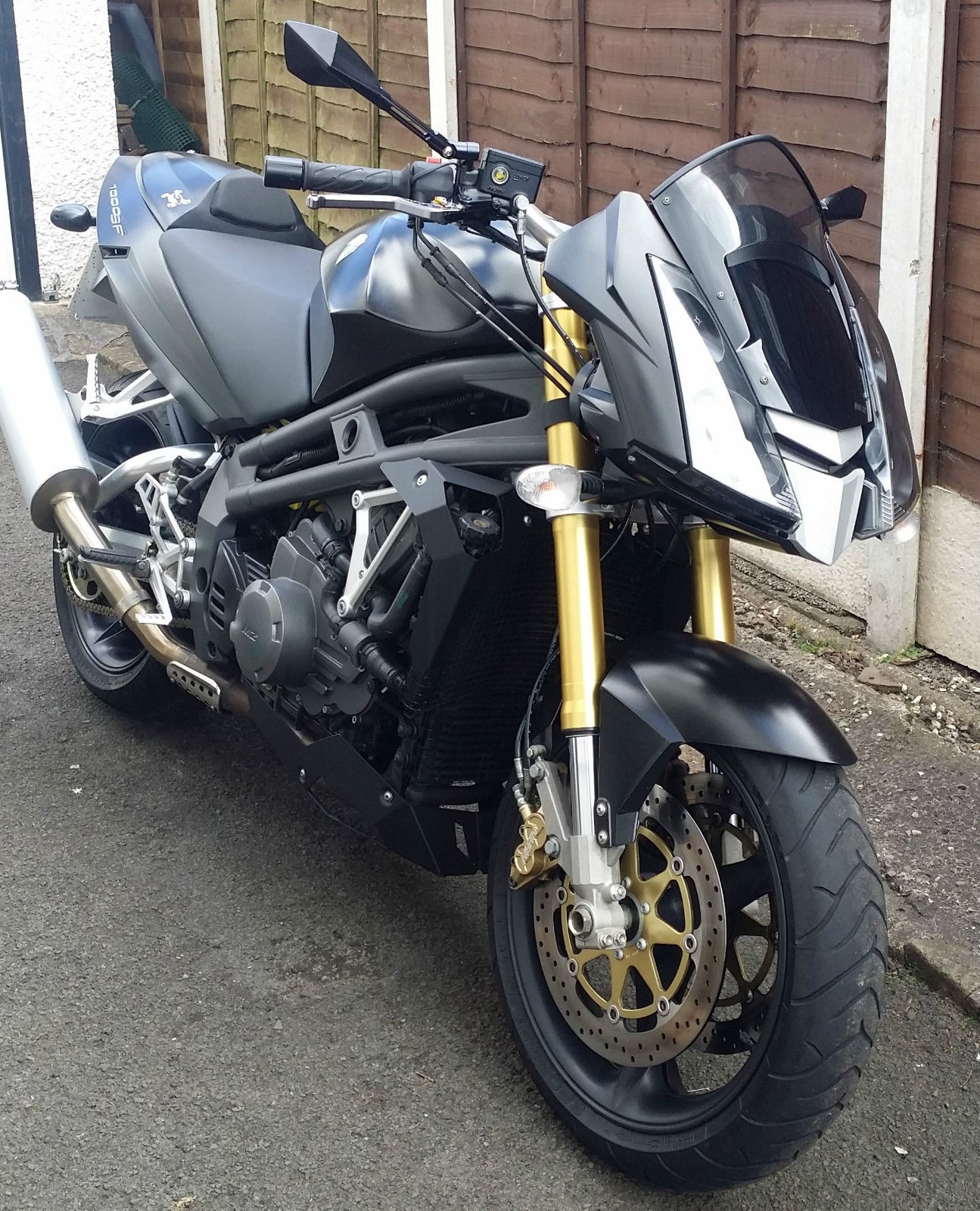
MZ 1000SF

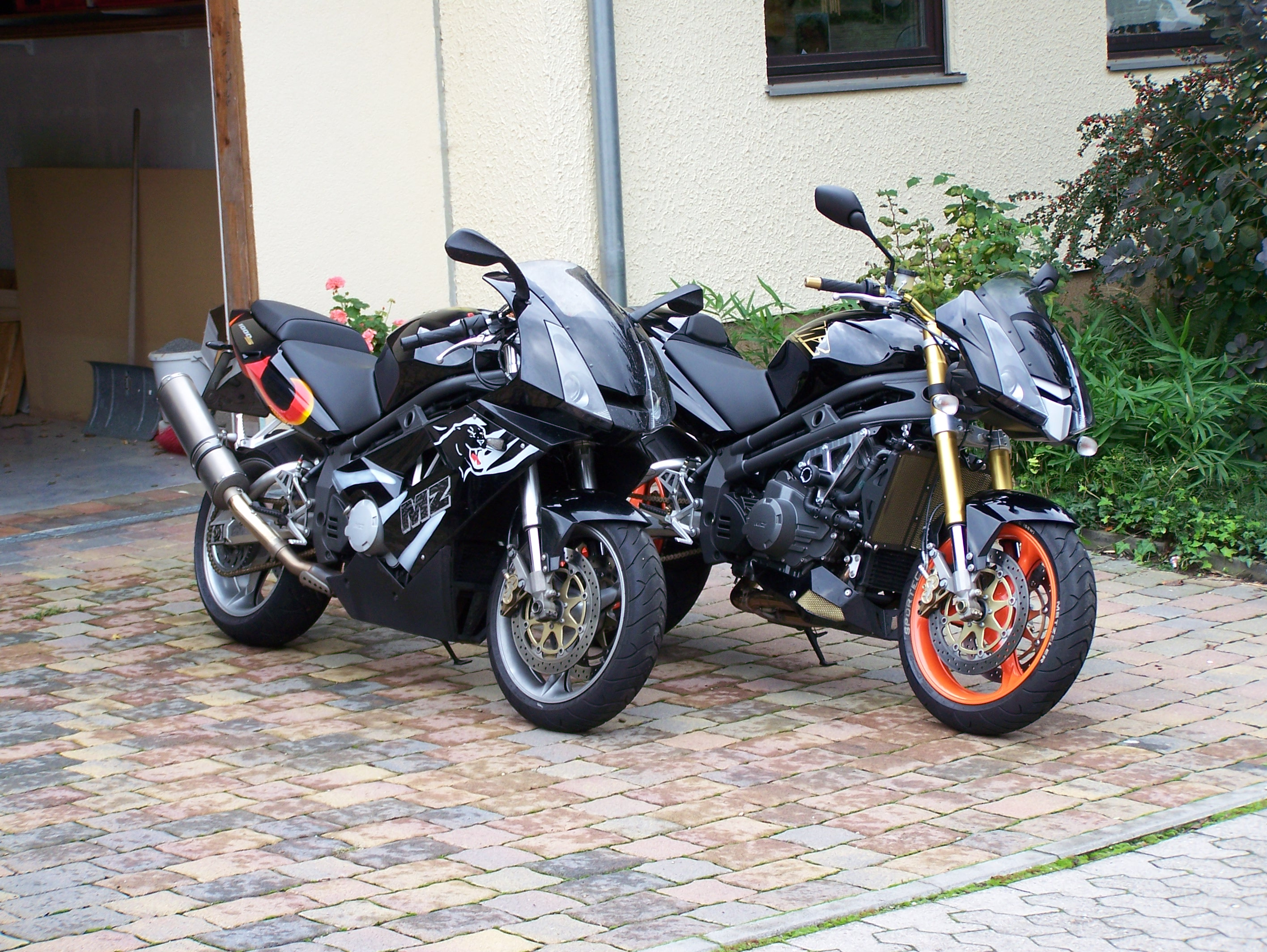
S & SF bikes together

=== MZ 1000SF ===
The SF "SuperFighter" is a naked streetfighter, using the same engine as the ST.

== Reception ==
The MZ 1000 was quite well received, although MCN journalists thought it rather expensive and "poor value". MCN damned the bike with faint praise, saying: "But as the Yamaha TRX850 demonstrated, many bikers aren't especially keen on parallel twins..." and "MZ is trying something different with its parallel twin 1000S and Streetfighter, but it lacks the X factor and doesn't have the kind of dealer/distributor back-up you need when buying a slightly oddball motorbike."

However, in a four-bike comparison test in 2005 between the Honda Firestorm, Ducati 1000SS, Suzuki SV1000, Fast Bikes magazine declared the MZ 1000S the clear winner, saying: "It combines the uniqueness and style of the Italian, with the usability and build quality of the Japanese, and to top it all off is far more fun to ride than any of them."

Motorcyclist praised the bike saying: "The MZ 1000 is a well-engineered, capable machine that is built to last..."
