= Super single =

Super single may refer to:

- Super single wheels on large trucks, where a single larger wheel and tire substitutes for a pair of adjacent wheels on one hub.
- Formula 450 motorcycle racing, originally called "Super Single" for its use of single cylinder engines
