= MZ BK 350 =

IFA/MZ BK 350
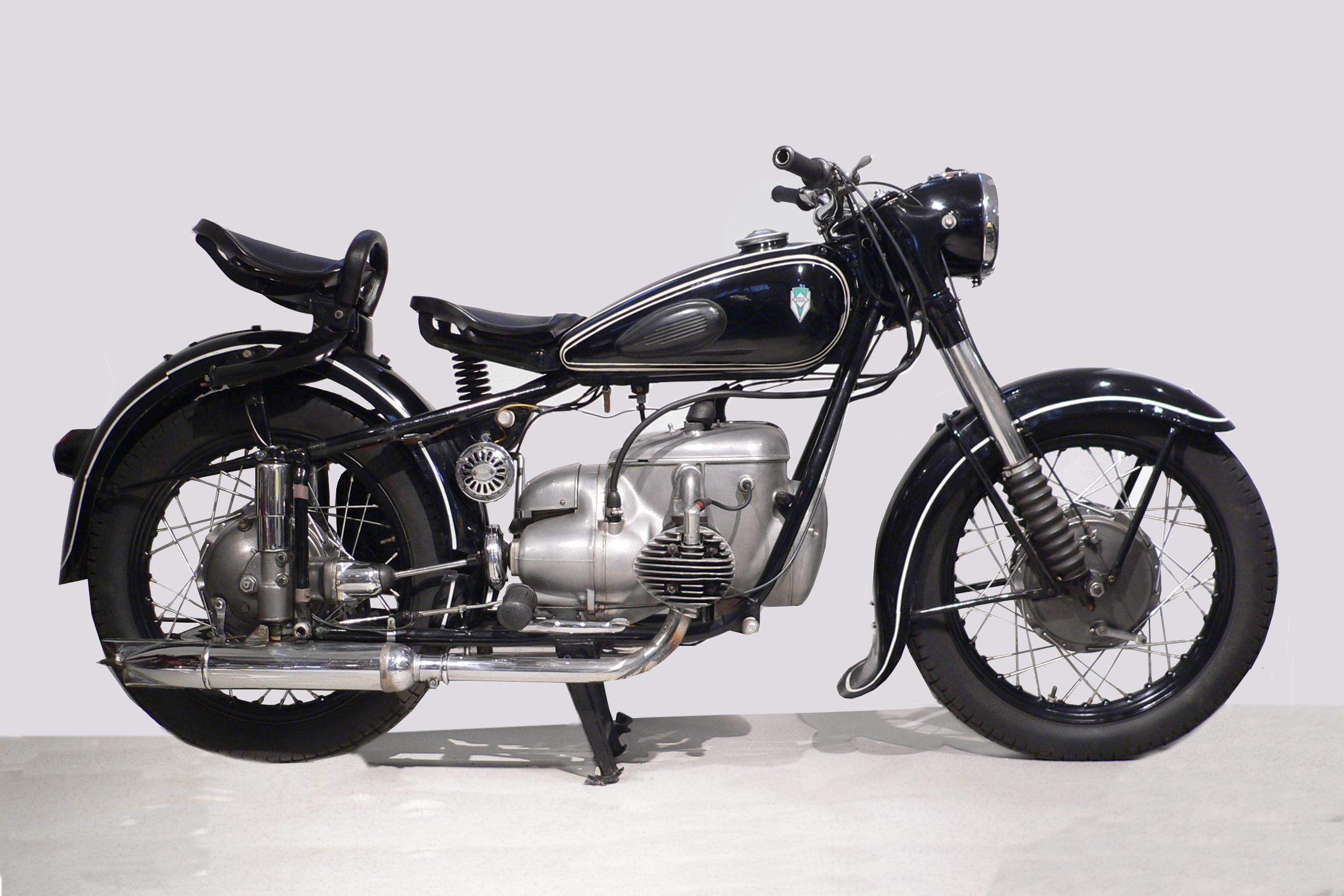
- IFA BK 350 (built in 1956)
- Manufacturer: IFA-Motorradwerk Zschopau
- Production: 1952–1959
- Engine: → see table

The MZ BK 350 is a motorcycle manufactured by the IFA-Motorradwerk Zschopau (from October 21, 1953: VEB Motorradwerk Zschopau) from 1952 to 1959; until 1956 under the designation "IFA BK 350". The abbreviation BK in the model name stood for Boxer, Kardan (english: Boxer-twin engine, Cardan shaft).

== History ==
As early as 1946, functional prototypes of the future BK 350 could be developed and tested at Bark, based on DKW designs. The BK 350 was unveiled as a DKW twin-cylinder motorcycle at the 1951 Leipzig Spring Fair. However, the start of series production was delayed until the end of 1952.

The BK 350 was the first (Note: Although the DKW L60 lightweight motorcycle was exhibited at the Leipzig Spring Fair as early as 1948, it did not go into mass production.) new design from the former DKW plant following the end of the war; due to its unique engineering (boxer engine and cardan drive), it was awaited internationally with great interest. At the start of series production, it was marketed under the name of IFA, the state-run vehicle manufacturing association of the GDR.

Building on the positive experience gained with the ES series, the development of a full-swing-arm chassis designated "BK 351" was completed in 1958, and a few functional prototypes were built. One such prototype chassis was used for the MZ KKM 175 W, built in 1963. However, as a decision was simultaneously made to significantly increase production volumes of the ES models – which were less complex to manufacture – production of the BK 350 was phased out in 1959. A total of 41,163 BK 350 units were produced, 6,036 of which were for the export market.

From 1957 onwards, the MZ ES 250 – produced concurrently at MZ – was sold with its power output increased to 14.25 PS (10.48 kW). As the performance gap relative to the BK 350 would have become relatively narrow, the BK's engine output was simultaneously raised to 17 PS (13 kW). Noise emissions were noticeably reduced thanks to the accompanying improvements in intake and exhaust silencing.

== Technical details ==
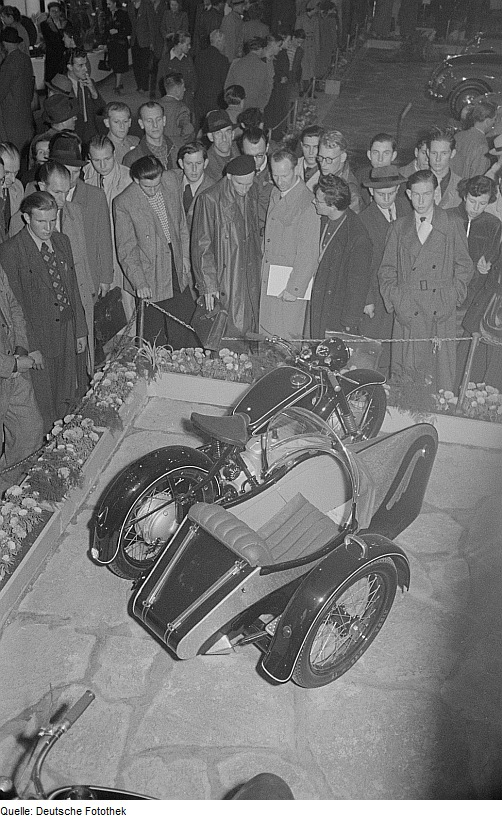
IFA BK 350 with Stoye sidecar at the Leipzig Autumn Fair 1952

=== Chassis ===
The frame is a welded double cradle steel frame featuring attachment points for a sidecar (which can be mounted on either the right or left side). It is reinforced at the steering head with triangular gusset plates. The BK 350 features plunger rear suspension and in front a telescopic fork; the integrated steering damper can be adjusted via a star-knob screw on the upper fork yoke. The BK 350 is equipped with quick-release axles at the front and rear, and both internal-shoe brakes have a diameter of 200 mm.

=== Engine ===
The BK 350 is powered by a twin-cylinder, two-stroke boxer engine with a total displacement of 343.4 cc; it initially produced 15 hp, with output increasing to 17 hp from 1957 onwards. The inspiration for this engine configuration came from development work carried out at the main DKW plant in Zschopau towards the end of World War II, aimed at producing a short-stroke boxer engine to serve as a starter unit for aircraft.

According to the manufacturer, MZ, the decision to split the displacement between two cylinders was made due to the high scavenging losses associated with three-port scavenging systems in engines exceeding 250 cc. A cardan shaft was selected to transmit power to the rear wheel because drive chains were difficult to obtain at the time. For these reasons, a boxer engine with a longitudinally mounted crankshaft was designed. The claw-switched four-speed transmission is housed in a casing flanged to the rear of the engine block. A sheet-metal-encased rubber coupling is mounted on the rearward-projecting drive shaft; the driveshaft itself is seated within this coupling in a manner that allows for axial sliding (to compensate for length changes caused by the suspension). The angular movement occurring at the rear-wheel drive during suspension travel is accommodated by a universal joint that is also enclosed in a sheet-metal housing.

=== Electrical System ===
The BK 350 features a 6 V DC generator with a rated output of 60 W. The associated voltage regulator is housed alongside the generator beneath the front engine casing cover. The battery is located on the clutch side, underneath the side panel; the electrical fuses and the onboard tool kit are also situated here. The headlight is a surface-mounted unit with a diameter of 160 mm. It is fitted with a 6 V/35 W+35 W Bilux bulb. The speedometer and the ignition switch are integrated into the headlight housing.

=== Sidecar ===
The BK 350 is designed for sidecar operation, attaching to the BK frame at three points. The sidecar offered by the factory was manufactured by Stoye-Fahrzeugbau-Leipzig.

== Specifications ==
IFA/MZ BK 350
Production	1952–1959
Engine	longitudinally mounted, airstream-cooled boxer-twin two-stroke engine, kick start
Design	piston-controlled inlet port
Bore × Stroke	58 mm × 65 mm (2.3 in × 2.6 in)
Displacement	343.4 cc (20.96 cu in)
Compression ratio	7 : 1
Power rating	15 PS (11 kW) at 5000/min; from 1957: 17 PS (13 kW) at 5100/min
Introduction of fuel	BVF-carburetor NB 22-1
Lubrication	total-loss lubrication system, fuel-to-oil ratio 25 : 1
Ignition system	battery ignition, contact-controlled
Alternator	DC dynamo generator, 6 V – 45−60 W
Battery	6 V – 8 Ah
On-board voltage	6 V
Clutch	one-disk clutch in oil bath, mechanically operated
Transmission	4-speed helical gearbox, claw-switched; cardan shaft
Frame	double cradle steel frame
Dimension (L × W × H)	2,150 mm × 760 mm × 1,000 mm (85 in × 30 in × 39 in)
Wheelbase	1,400 mm (55 in)
Seat height	740 mm (29 in)
Front suspension	telescopic fork, hydraulically damped, not adjustable, suspension 150 mm (5.9 in)
Rear suspension	plunger, suspension 50 mm (2.0 in)
Front rim size	wire-spoke wheel, 2.50 × 19″
Rear rim size	wire-spoke wheel, 2.50 × 19″
Front tire	3.25–19″
Rear tire	3.25–19″
Front brake	simplex drum brake, diameter 200 mm (7.9 in), bowden cable operated
Rear brake	simplex drum brake, diameter 200 mm (7.9 in), bowden cable operated
Curb weight	142 kg (313 lb)
Maximum load	330 kg (730 lb)
Fuel capacity	16 l (reserve 2 l)
Top speed	115 km/h (71 mph)

== Off-road competition use ==
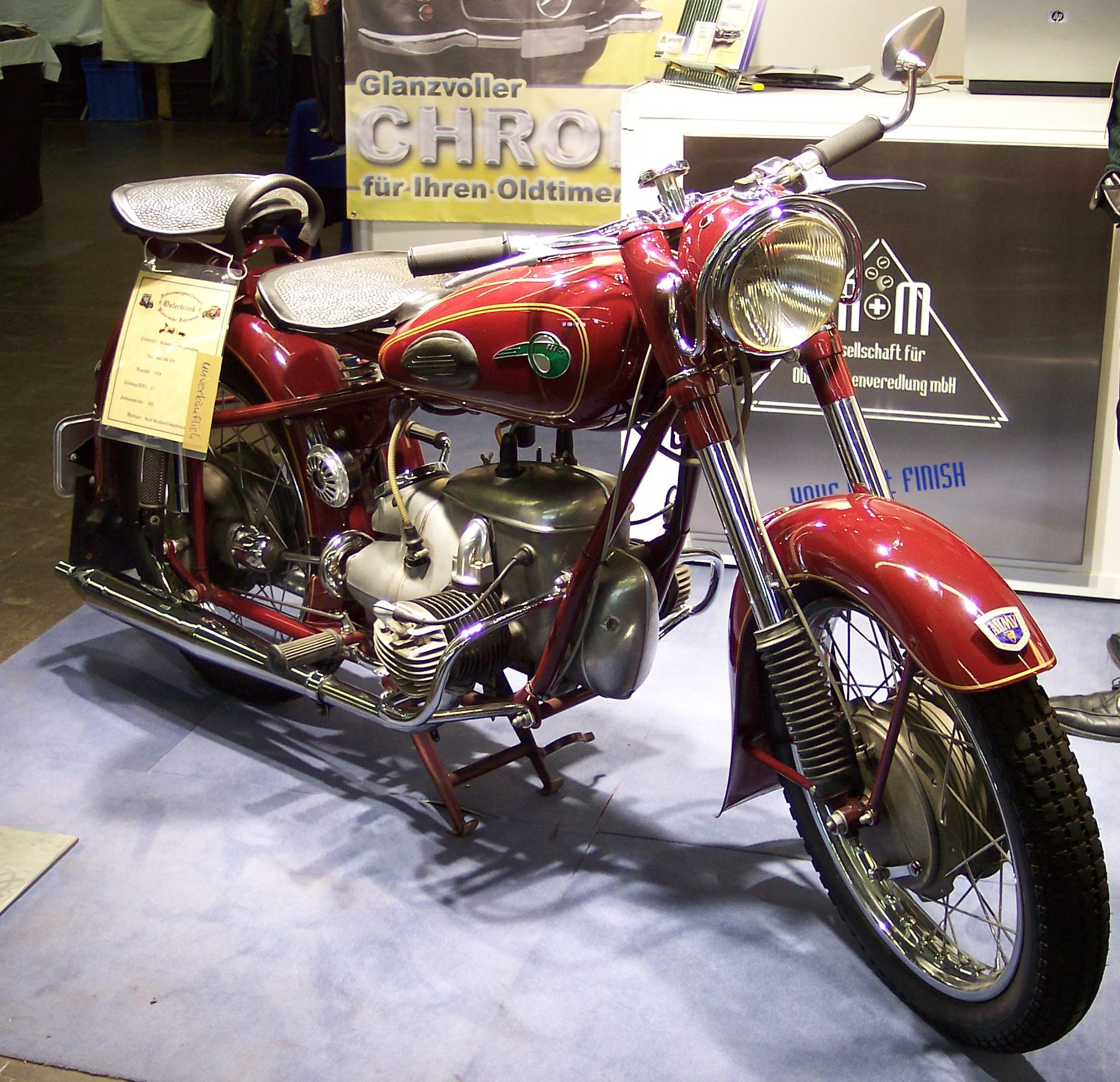
An MZ BK 350 configured for off-road competition, featuring knobby tires and protective guards for the headlight and cylinders

The BK 350 was also used in off-road competitions. For instance, in 1953, a three-man club team competed on BK 350s in the 28th International Six Days Trial held in Gottwaldov, Czechoslovakia. The machines were equipped with, among other things, the necessary off-road tires as well as protective guards for the headlight and cylinders.

In 1956, the magazine ″Illustrierter Motorsport″ published an article detailing technical modifications to boost the engine's power and improve off-road handling. This included a relatively complex modification of the exhaust system – requiring the installation of a pre-silencer – to raise its position.

== Reception ==
The engine was not fully refined; the volumetric efficiency of the left cylinder complicated carburetor adjustment, a result of the airflow dynamics within the shared crankcase. However, once properly adjusted, the carburetors operated without issues. To prevent malfunctions and carbon deposits, a riding style maintaining engine speeds above 3,000 rpm was recommended.

In 1955, the West German magazine ″Das Motorrad″ tested an IFA BK350. Engine performance was rated as good, albeit lower than that of comparable models from West Germany. The lower output was attributed, among other factors, to a lack of further development in the exhaust design (noting that "the East German industry was already using silencers of this type back in 1937"). Criticisms included strong vibrations at idle, issues with gear shifting – particularly when downshifting – and clearly audible gear-change noise. The riding position and road-holding were judged favorably. The tuning and effectiveness of the brakes were highlighted as strengths. Testers deemed the information provided in the owner's manual exemplary.

In 1958, the magazine ″Der Deutsche Straßenverkehr″ tested a BK 350 equipped with a Stoye sidecar. Aware that production of the model was slated to end and that the MZ ES 250 was already available as a sidecar outfit, the reviewers concluded that it was currently the most powerful machine for sidecar use. However, they noted that the design and engine performance had reached their limits, and the rear suspension travel of a mere 50 mm was outdated. Criticisms were raised regarding the gear ratios and shifting characteristics; downshifting, in particular, required a delicate touch, and the noise produced during gear changes was described as unpleasant. While the brakes were rated positively, the reviewers expressed a desire for a braked sidecar wheel. "If the MZ BK were to be discontinued, there would effectively be no heavy sidecar motorcycle available in the GDR. [...] One thing, however, we know for certain: a future 350cc model would need to produce at least 20 hp to be truly enjoyable as a sidecar outfit."

== Replicas ==
A copy of the BK was built in Japan during the 1950s and 1960s.
