= MZ Motorrad- und Zweiradwerk =

German motorcycle manufacturer

MZ Motorenwerke Zschopau GmbH, frm. MZ Motorrad- und Zweiradwerk GmbH
- Industry: Motorcycle
- Founded: 1906; 120 years ago
- Founder: Jørgen Skafte Rasmussen
- Defunct: 2008
- Headquarters: Zschopau, Germany
- Key people: Martin Wimmer
- Products: Electric bicycles, 3 Wheel Electric Motorcycles, Motorcycles (MZ 1000S), cogeneration units,
- Website: muz.de

Motorenwerke Zschopau GmbH (formerly MZ Motorrad- und Zweiradwerk GmbH) is a former German motorcycle manufacturer founded in Zschopau, Saxony. The acronym MZ since 1956 stands for Motorenwerke Zschopau GmbH (German for Zschopau engine factory). From 1992 to 1999 the company was called MuZ, an acronym for Motorrad und Zweiradwerk (German for motorcycle and two-wheeler factory).

== Timeline ==
- 1906 Jørgen Skafte Rasmussen (Denmark) buys an empty cloth factory in Zschopau
- 1907 engine supplier, producing engines for bicycles, motor-assisted bicycle
- 1917 Rasmussen invents the steam-powered car (Dampf-Kraft-Wagen), also known by its trademark DKW
- 1920 Release of the 2-stroke engines for motorcycles
- 1923 Company is renamed DKW
- 1924 DKW buys Slaby-Beringer
- 1927 Company starts racing activities
- 1928 DKW takes over the Audi factory at Zwickau
- 1929 60,000 motorcycles leave the Zschopau factory, and DKW is the largest motorcycle manufacturer in the world
- 1931 Introduction of DKW small cars
- 1932 The Auto Union is formed from Audi, Horch, Wanderer and DKW
- 1939 RT 125 is developed
- 1948 Now owned by the East German state, company is renamed Industrieverband Fahrzeugbau (IFA), a Communist-controlled umbrella foundation.
- 1949 Auto Union (and therefore, DKW) officially moves to Ingolstadt, Bavaria in West Germany.
- 1950 The Zschopau works begin production of the RT 125 model, developed before the war, under the trademark IFA (Industrieverband Fahrzeugbau). This model had become patent-free after World War II as part of war reparations and was further developed in Britain (BSA Bantam), USA (Harley-Davidson Hummer), Russia (M-1A Moskva), Japan, Italy and West Germany.
- 1952 The BK 350 appears, the first two-stroke shaft drive.
- 1956 The works is now called VEB Motorradwerk Zschopau, or MZ for short.
- 1962 Manufacture of the ES 125/ES 150 begins. This was the first motorcycle with an asymmetric low beam headlight pattern.
- 1970 The millionth motorcycle rolls off the conveyor belt, an MZ ETS 250 Trophy Sport
- 1972 MZ takes over manufacture of sidecars from Stoye.
- 1983 The two millionth motorcycle rolls off the conveyor belt, this time an MZ ETZ 250. With disc brakes (drum brakes remained an option) and 12-volt electrics the MZ had reached the modern standard in motorcycle design.
- 1989 MZ ceases manufacture of sidecars.
- 1990 MZ is privatised on 18 December.
- 1993 MZ enters receivership, and the ETZ patent is sold to the Turkish firm Kanuni, which continued producing models 251 and 301. The MuZ company is formed from the remnant.
- 1996 MuZ is bought by the Malaysian corporation Hong Leong Group
- 1999 The u is dropped from the name MuZ.
- 2008 – On 9 June, Motor Cycle News reports that MZ is to cease operations at the end of 2008 because the company's Malaysian backers had withdrawn their financial support after years of continuing losses.
- 2008 – On 12 December, the MZ factory in Zschopau closes, halting motorcycle production that had lasted 88 years in the same town. The old 'East German' factory had become a night club, called MZWerk in 1992. the production had moved to Hohndorf since 1995.
- 2009 – Former Grand Prix stars Ralf Waldmann and Martin Wimmer together with his wife Dr. Martina Häger buy the MZ motorcycle brand and found Motorenwerke Zschopau GmbH. The asset deal goes through on 23 March 2009 for a reported four million euros. The cash is put up Dr. Martina Häger 90% and Ralf Waldmann 10%. The new board consists of Martin Wimmer, Dr Martina Häger, Ralph Waldmann, Helmut Lichtenberg and Otto Elbers. Wimmer takes the role of MZ Managing Director. As the company's financing for starting a production is not yet secured, the State of Saxony through the Minister of Finance, Prof. Dr. Georg Unland, commits to a local state bank guarantee in August 2009. The business plan consisted of building bicycles, 125 cc (7.6 cu in) motorcycles as well as developing block heating cogeneration stations of different sizes. There were plans for the firm to produce a 600 cc (37 cu in) road bike based on the Moto2 GP project bike.
- 2011 – It took two years until the local state bank guarantee was handed out in connection with the financing bank, Merkur Bank of Munich, Germany. Also investor Peter Ertel, a company shareholder since 2010, pays out Dr. Martina Häger and Ralf Waldmann in July 2011. He becomes the main shareholder of Motorenwerke Zschopau GmbH.
- 2012 – In February 2012, the company struggled as two customers don't pay their bills totalling 530,000 euros. In addition, the company Clean Mobile AG, Munich, a supplier for the electric drive units of the E-bike production has to declare insolvency. One of the customers of MZ also does not pay his bills with them. The complete production of E-bike comes to a stop. In August 2012, MZ CEO Wimmer gets a loan offer from Merkur Bank based on the company's cash deposit at the bank. He had found a new investor to overcome the company's difficulties and needed to bridge the time until the investment could be closed. Unforseeably, beginning of September 2012, Merkur Bank withdrew their loan offer. According to German law, Wimmer was forced to file for insolvency proceedings on September 7, 2012. This was despite the fact that the company had enough assets to continue business. At a meeting held on September 21, 2012, including all creditors and employees, Wimmer gets their consent and extension agreements to continue to run the company, only Merkur Bank wanted to have an internal meeting on September 24, 2012, before their decision. In the afternoon of September 24, 2012 they withdrew their support. On September 28, 2012, insolvency lawyer Junker gets appointed and thus Wimmer gets detracted to run the company. Nevertheless, he convinces Junker to have Motorenwerke Zschopau GmbH present all their products on the world's biggest motorcycle show, Intermot in Cologne starting on October 2. Everything had been prepared including the launch of the world's first motorcycle with a variable valvelift and valve timing cylinder head, the MZ RT 125. Motorcycle News reported the revolutionary engine. After the show, starting October 6, 2012, Wimmer tries to save the company by finding investors to get rid of Junker. In a letter to the Merkur Bank dated October 12 the funds deposited are requested to be paid out. Merkur Bank withheld the funds and refused to pay them out. On November 5, 2012, the insolvency proceedings became irrevocable by a court decision. On November 19, 2012, Merkur Bank now do pay out the funds requested before, but meanwhile they own all assets of Motorenwerke Zschopau GmbH as they had been given as guarantee for their bank credits.
- 2013 In January investor Peter Ertel sued Merkur Bank. In April Merkur Bank countersued Ertel and included Wimmer. In June Wimmer countersued Merkur Bank for the loss of his shares in Motorenwerke Zschopau GmbH. The case is still ongoing under the file reference 3O 565/13 before the Landgericht Munich I, the local court in Munich, Germany. The insolvency lawyer Junker does not find any successors for Wimmer and Ertel and declares that he is unable to continue to run Motorenwerke Zschopau GmbH on April 30, 2013. On May 17, Motorcycle News reports that MZ is declared insolvent and unable to be continued.

The Zschopau works was one of the oldest motorcycle factories in the world, producing motorcycles since 1922. They were the first company to develop the two-stroke engine for vehicles and were the leader in two-stroke development worldwide. Rasmussen had begun the motorcycle production under the brand name DKW. Later he also started the car company DKW cars. In the world economic crises of 1929, four local car manufacturers under the leadership of Rasmussen's DKW founded Auto Union, nowadays known as Audi AG car manufacturer. The best known models from Zschopau later were the two-stroke 125/150 and 250 series, with the variants ES, ETS, TS and ETZ. In the 1950s, MZ was the world leader in two-stroke engines. Especially through the work of their racing engineer and department leader Walter Kaaden their engines became nearly unbeatable and in 1961 they nearly won the world championships in the 125 cc class against Soichiro Honda's four-stroke engines. The championship was lost through one of the biggest spy scandals in motorcycle history. The factory rider Ernst Degner fled from East Germany and brought all their knowledge to Suzuki. Walter Kaaden's secret was stolen. He had developed the two-stroke exhaust pipe, known as expansion chamber. In 1962, with his stolen knowledge that he brought to Suzuki he won the first world title for the Japanese manufacturer. The British author Mat Oxley wrote a book about this scandal: Stealing Speed. Later MZ was one of the few producers that made motorcycles with sidecars, though prior to 1972 sidecars were manufactured by Stoye. A later version named the MuZ Voyager was an Austrian 500 cc, four-valve, rotax-equipped, retro-styled standard, custom-painted to match the model #562 sidecar made by Velorex of Czechoslovakia. However, a cease and desist order was issued in the early 1990s by Kawasaki, who owned the rights to that name, and MuZ subsequently renamed the motorcycle the Silverstar, and the sidecar-equipped version the Silverstar Gespann. Only after Hong Leong Group took over the lead of MZ Motorrad und Zweiradwerke GmbH the funding was secured to invest in the development of new engines and motorcycles. They developed with the German MZ engineers the models MZ 1000s and MZ RT 125.

== Sports ==
=== Enduro ===
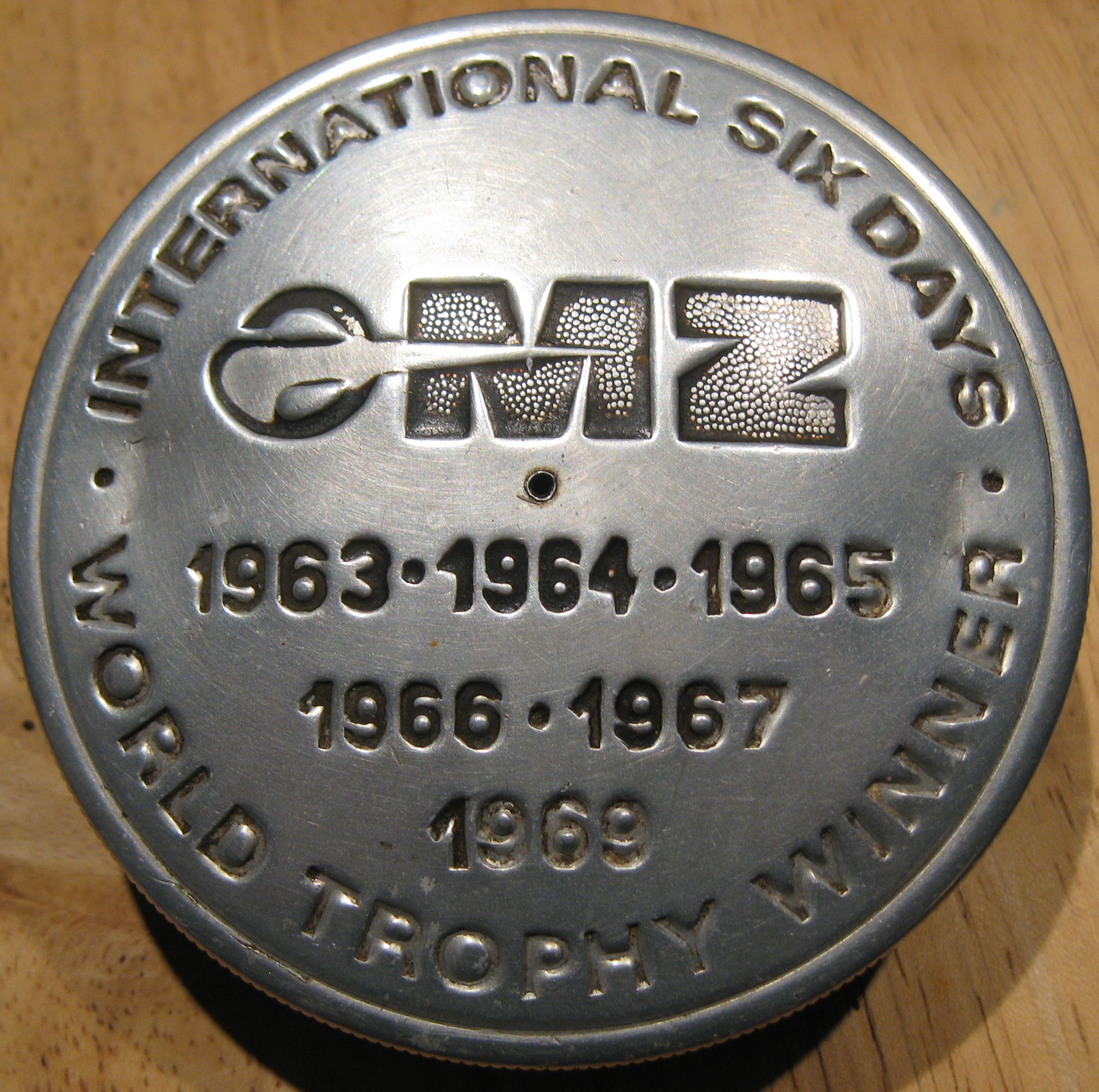
1960s Enduro victories

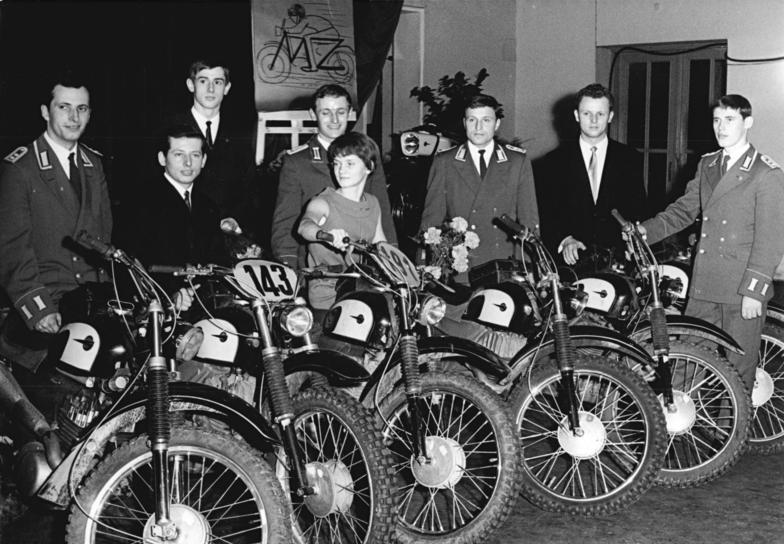
1968 MZ Enduro team

The MZ Enduro team was the winner of the International Six Day Trial various times between the 1960s and 1980s, having won the event in 1963, 1964, 1965, 1966, 1967, 1969, and 1987.

=== Road racing ===
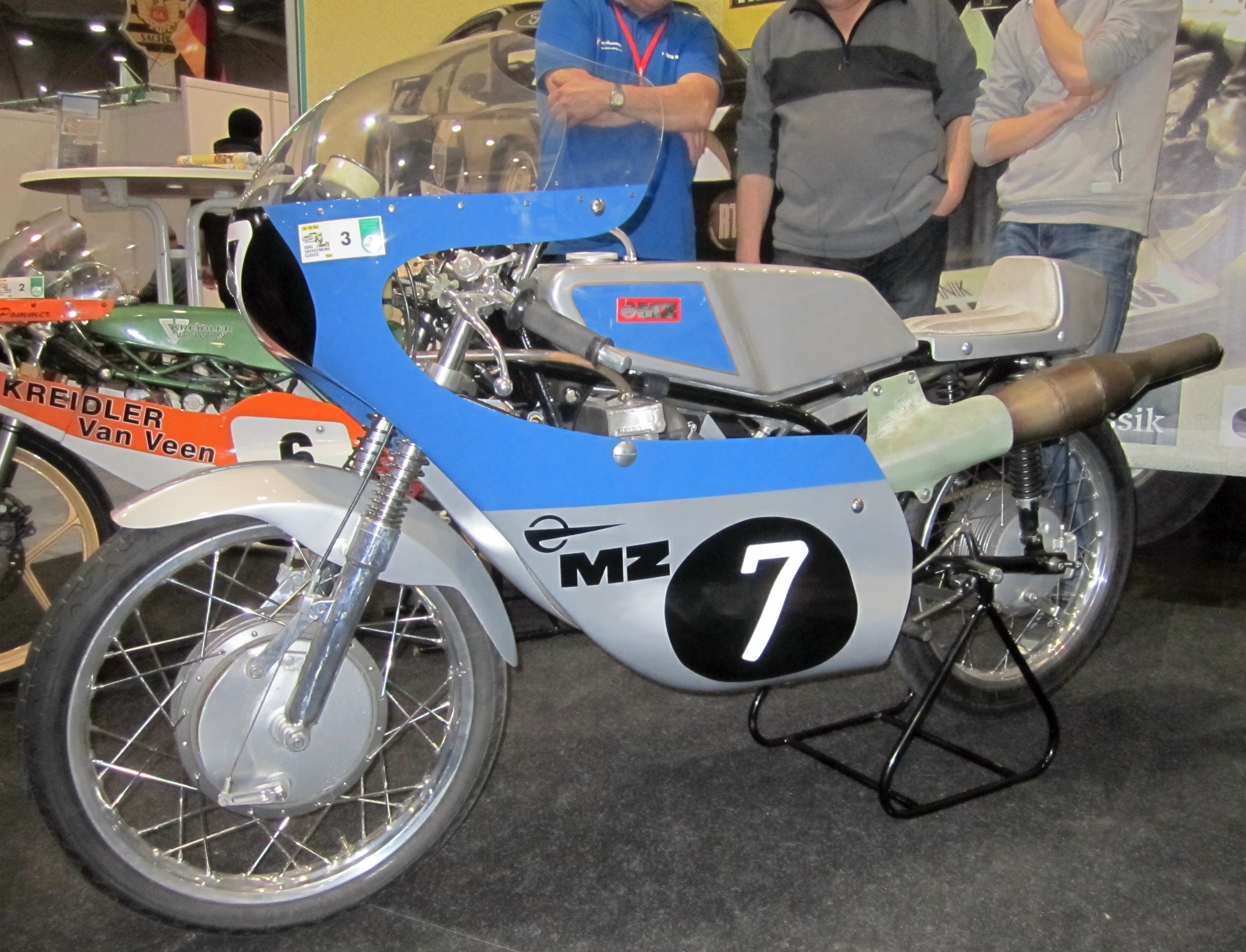
1972 MZ RE 125

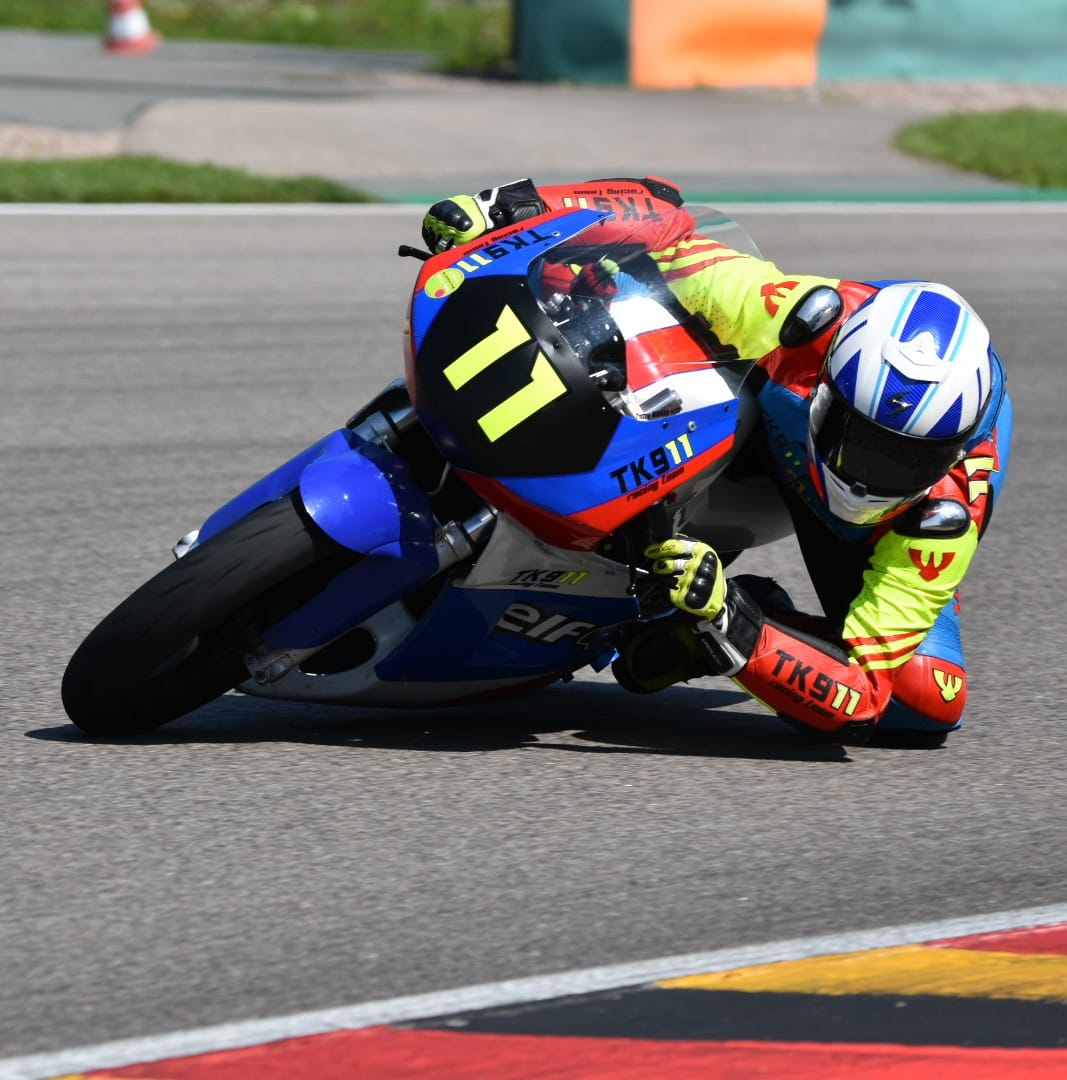
MZ Skorpion racing in the MZ-Cup

The MZ two-stroke engines, developed by engineer Walter Kaaden, have influenced motorcycle racing for decades. His 1961 125 cc race engine design was the first to achieve an output of 200 bhp (150 kW) per litre. His two-stroke system was copied widely in the 1960s by Japanese manufacturers. Suzuki two-stroke engines became competitive in motor sport only after they gained possession of Kaaden's MZ design secrets from racer Ernst Degner after his defection from East Germany in 1961. MZs were ridden to 13 GP victories and 105 podium places between 1955 and 1976.

The MZ ETZ 250 and 251 are currently being used in club racing around Britain in the British MZ Racing Club (BMRC), providing budget racing for those who want to race with all of the fun but less of the expense.

In 2010, MZ under Wimmer started to compete in the new Moto2 Grand Prix class with Anthony West. After initial problems (MZ were the only manufacturers to use a steel frame) Peter Rubatto, known in Germany as Mr. Superbike, took over the race team management from Ralf Waldmann. MZ scored points and managed to be in the front row of the Indianapolis GP in 2010.

In 2011, the MZ Racing Team was extended to 2 riders, Anthony West and Max Neukirchner. The riders were managed by Marco Nicotari (Max Neukirchner) and Warren Willing (Anthony West). In the last race of the season 2011, Anthony West had a bad starting position but ran through the field and nearly won the first Grand Prix for MZ since the 1960s. The season 2012 was unsuccessful under the influence of the financial problems. At the end of August 2012 the team had to withdraw from racing.

The MZ Skorpion Sport got its own racing series in several countries since 1996. Famous for its precise handling, it is still a popular mount for club racing. Its Yamaha-based engine can be reliably tuned to 150 percent of its original performance. At that stage, it can become competitive in Supermono as well as single and twin-cylinder or even already historic racing classes. Based in Germany, the low-budget one-make MZ-Cup is the oldest and longest lasting one-brand and one-make cup for motorcycles worldwide. From 2022 on the MZ-Cup also opened up for off ranking guest participations of other selected single-cylinder bikes.

From 2006 to 2007, the Malaysian Cub Prix held the MZ Mantizz 125 Challenge, a one-make series which used the MZ Mantizz.

== Notable models ==
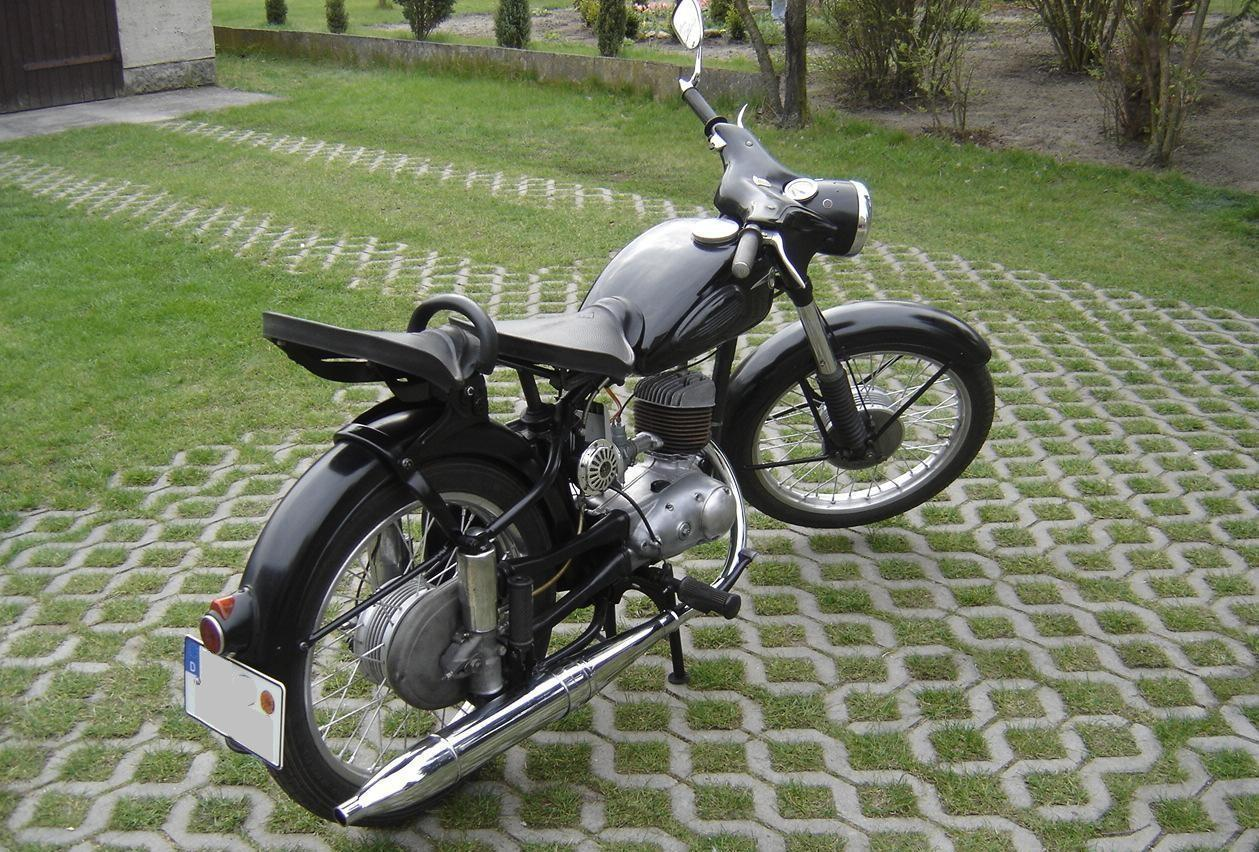
MZ RT 125/3, 1959–1962

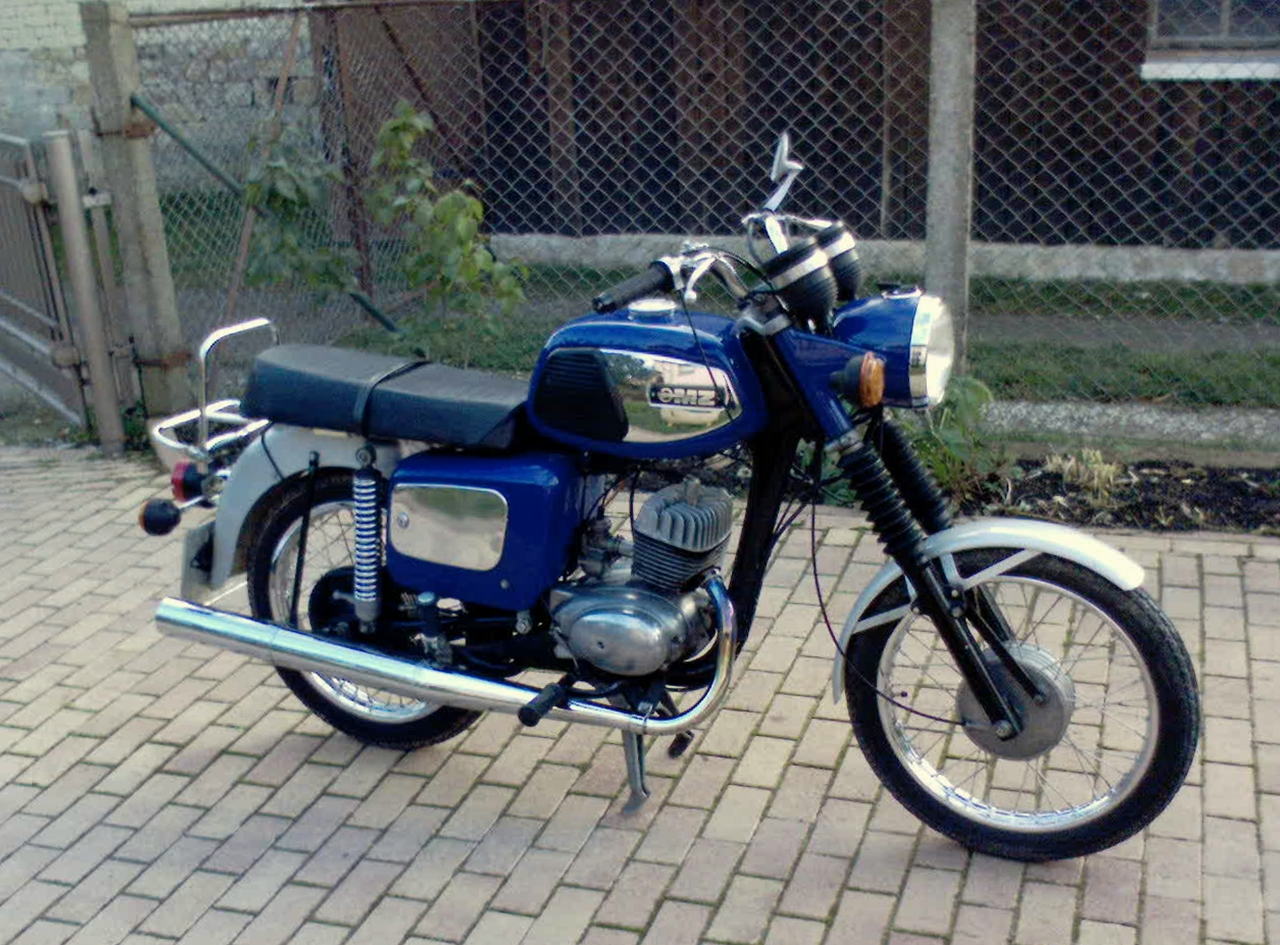
MZ TS 150

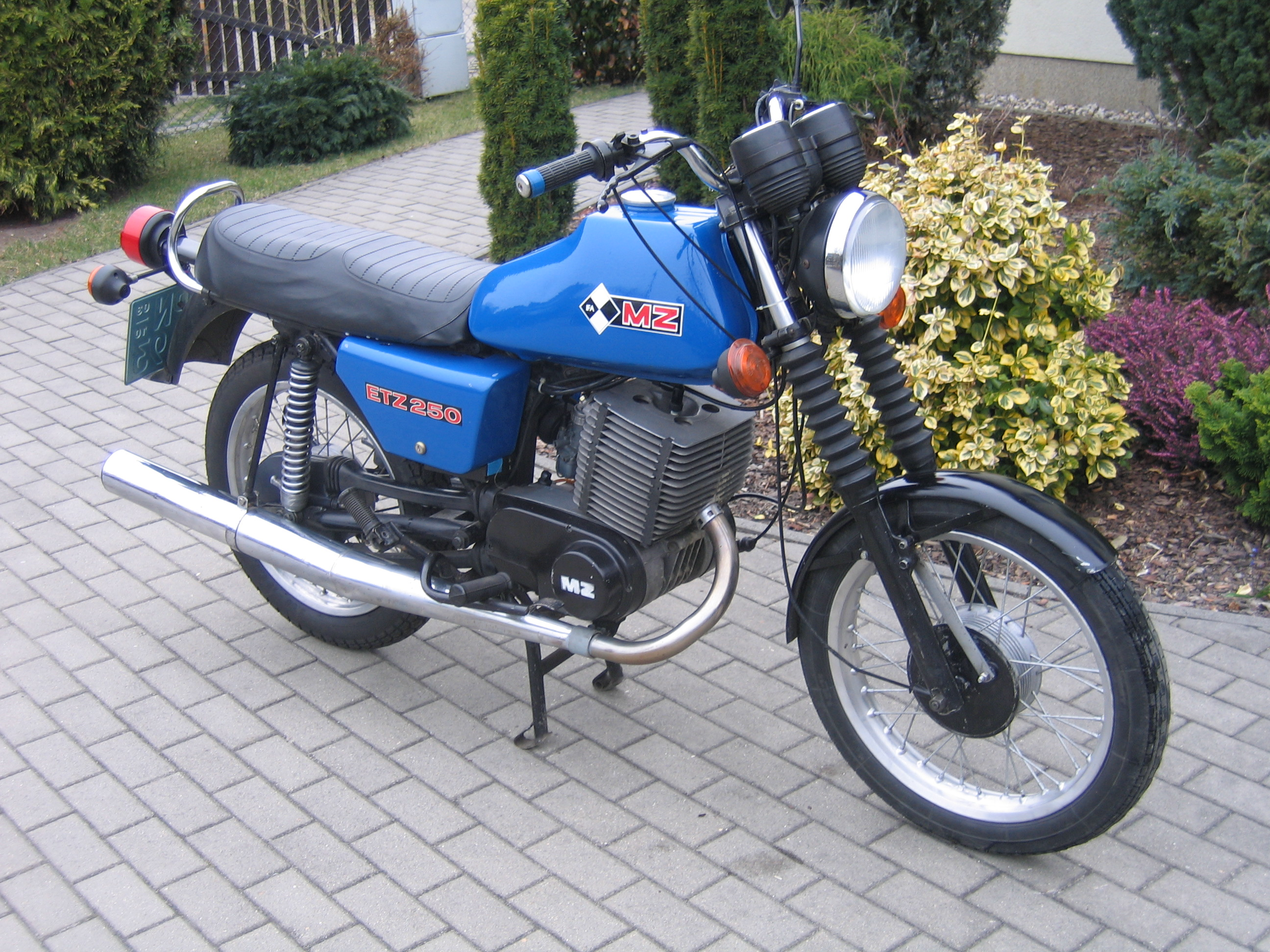
MZ ETZ 250

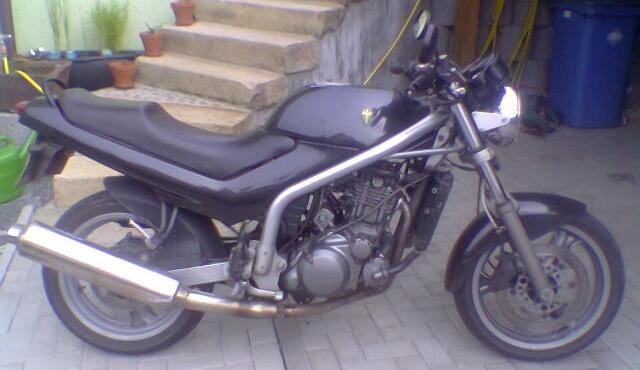
MZ Skorpion Tour

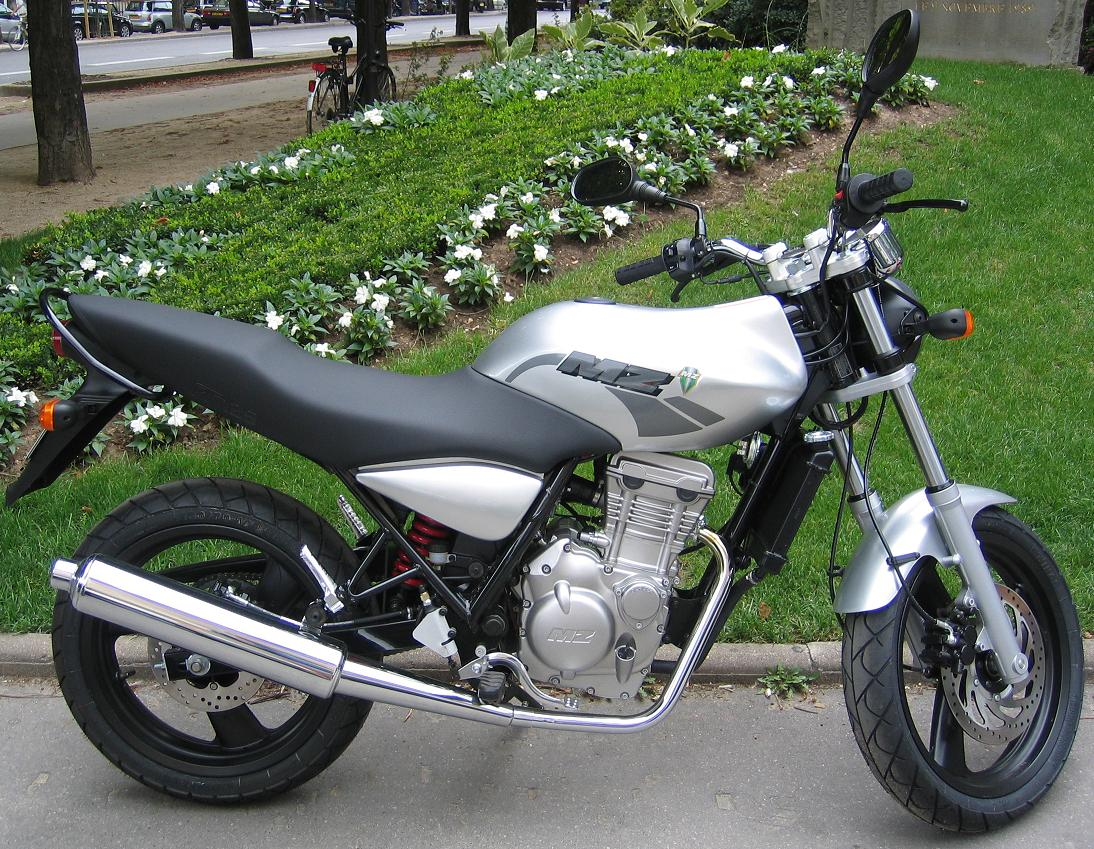
MZ RT 125

- RT 125: 1939–1962
- MZ ES 125/150: Pressed steel frame with Earles type front suspension. Four speed, six volt, pre-mix.
- MZ 125: 1949–1965
- MZ BK 350: 1952–1959
- MZ ES 175/250/300: Utilized a pressed steel body with Earles type front suspension.
- MZ ETS 125/150: 1969–1973
- MZ ETS 250: Sports version of the ES but with more traditional type of tank and telescopic forks. The distinctive 5 imperial gallons (23 L; 6.0 US gal) fuel tank makes this model a desirable classic motorcycle.
- MZ TS 125/150: Direct descendants of the RT 125, and the last MZs to use "premix" fuel and a 6-volt electrical system.
- MZ TS 250: Developed from the ES/ETS machines but with a new frame. The engine hung from the top beam pivoting at the rear with no front down tube. Early models were four-speed machines with the vertical finned cylinder head but the later machines had the flat top engine and five-speed gear box, the basis of the later models. These models were all 6-volt and pre-mix fuel.
- MZ ETZ 250: The first road going MZ to include a disk front brake and automatic oil injection. There has been a special model ETZ250A which equipped the GDR's army and has been exported to several countries of the former east block.
- MZ ETZ 251/301: Derived from the ETZ 250 but with modifications to the motor and chassis.
- MZ ETZ 125/150: with totally new constructed 125/150 engine, now with the flat-topped cylinder head, five-speed gearbox and autolube. The design of the engine was still derived from the original DKW design, apparent from the concentric kick start and gear lever arrangement.
- MZ 500 R: MZ's first four-stroke motorcycle, essentially an ETZ 251 with a Rotax 500 cc engine fitted, although the engine was no longer rubber mounted and a front down tube provided extra support.
- MZ Skorpion: The 500 cc Rotax engine used on the Seymour-Powell designed prototype was replaced with a 660 cc Yamaha water-cooled engine on the production vehicle.
- MZ 1000S: MZ's biggest bike, and their first "in-house" four-stroke engine. The MZ 1000S is the most powerful inline twin cylinder engine worldwide.
- MZ RT 125: 2000−2008
- MZ 125 SX and MZ 125 SM: 2001−2008

== UK Importer "Specials" ==
In the early 1980s in the UK, MZ were regarded by the motorcycle press as producing ugly and old-fashioned (if worthy) motorcycles. The then importer, Wilf Green, decided to try and update the image of the bikes by producing his own modified versions of the TS 125, christened the “Pathfinder” and the “Sport”.

Both bikes were, in essence, standard TS 125 deluxe models with remodelled fuel tanks and a remodelled, shortened GRP rear mudguard. The Sport also had a re-sculpted seat whereas the Pathfinder was transformed into a budget trial bike with the addition of knobbly tyres, high level front mudguard, motocross bars, high level exhaust and remodelled airbox. Neither bike was produced in great numbers.

Green subsequently created the ETZ 300 (as distinct from the later, factory produced ETZ 301), which was essentially a standard ETZ 250 with a re-bored (and slightly restyled) engine, cockpit fairing and revised decals. Shortly after releasing this bike, however, Green lost the MZ import franchise meaning an end to importer-modified special editions in the UK.

== Most recent models ==
MZ manufactured a line of 125 cc four-stroke motorcycles using an engine that was designed in-house. The MZ 125 produces 15 bhp (11 kW) and nearly 10 lb⋅ft (14 N⋅m) of torque. It is a liquid-cooled, dual-overhead-cam design with four valves, high-voltage electronic ignition and an 11,000 rpm ignition cut-off. This engine was used in four models, all of which share a common frame. The frame is a tube-steel backbone with the engine as a stressed bottom member. Differences in the suspension, fascia, gearing, and equipment make the four models relatively distinct, despite the shared platform. All four bikes feature a six-speed transmission and dual disc brakes.

- The RT-125 is a mini naked sport bike introduced in 2000. It features a 125 cc liquid-cooled DOHC single-cylinder engine, developing 15 bhp.
- The 125 SM is a Supermotard style bike with taller street tuned suspension, tallish gearing, and reduced weight.
- The 125 SX features the same appearance as the SM but has a suspension tuned more for off-road use, enduro-style tires, and slightly lower gear ratios.
- The 125 FunX is a minimalist light-duty motocross bike.

All four 125s are capable of speeds over 65 mph (105 km/h), with the fastest being the RT and SM, both of which are capable of 75 mph (121 km/h) sustained speeds.

MZ also used a Yamaha-built 660 cc single in the Baghira line of mid-displacement Enduro/DualPurpose/Motard bikes.

The last new MZ model was the 1000S which featured a novel 1000 cc, DOHC parallel twin designed and built by MZ. The 1000S is a sport-tourer by design. The 1000S' unique engine is exceptionally compact for its displacement. The range includes a naked (unfaired) version and a full tourer with luggage, higher handlebars, and lower footpegs for comfort. Both of these are retuned, with less outright horsepower than the 'S', but with more torque.

In addition to the 1000S, MZ also produced the naked version of the 1000S, known as the MZ1000SF, and the sports touring version called the MZ1000ST. MZ also produces its own lines of scooters called the MZ Moskito, powered by a 50 cc two-stroke engine.

Besides scooters, MZ also produced its own line of underbone motorcycles, targeted for the Southeast Asian market. Their debut underbone model was the MZ Perintis 120, launched in 2002. The Perintis was succeeded by the MZ Mantizz, launched in 2004. The Mantizz series has two displacement options – 125 cc and 110 cc. All MZ underbone models are powered by four-stroke engines and are manufactured in MZ's Malaysian plant in Shah Alam.

MZ also competed in the European GP-500 class with race-only models, and built several scooter and ATV models ranging in displacement from 50 cc to 185 cc, as well as the Charlie electric scooter, the fastest stand-up electric scooter produced.
