= MZ Skorpion =

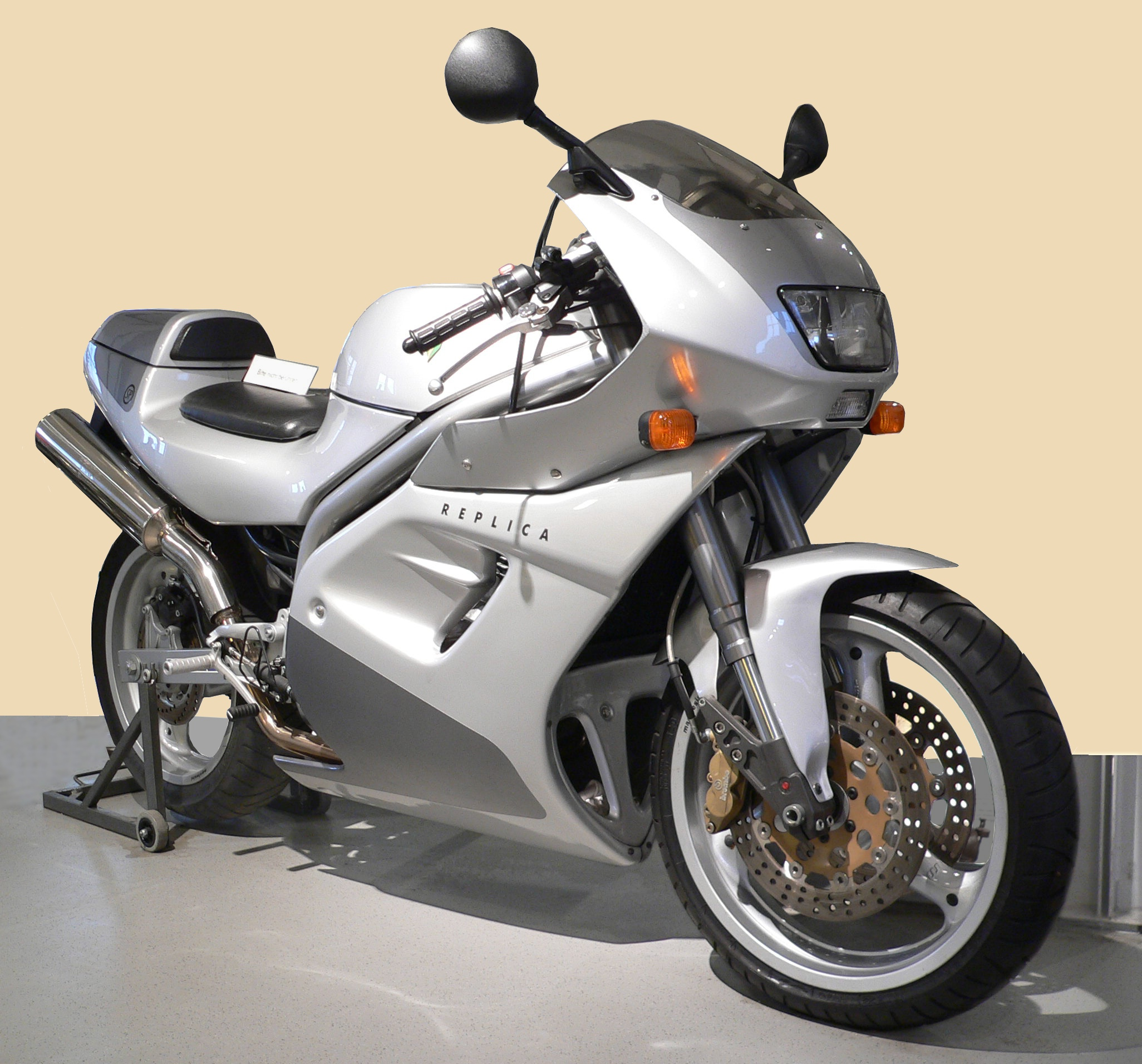
- MZ Skorpion Replica
- Manufacturer: MZ
- Production: 1994–2004
- Class: Sport bike (Sport Cup), sport touring (Traveller), standard (Tour)
- Engine: 656 cc (40.0 cu in) 5-valve SOHC liquid-cooled 4-stroke single dry sump
- Bore / stroke: 100 mm × 84 mm (3.9 in × 3.3 in)
- Top speed: 116 mph (187 km/h)
- Power: 48 bhp (36 kW)
- Transmission: 5 speed, wet multi-plate clutch
- Weight: 173 kg (381 lb) (dry); 189 kg (416 lb) (wet)
- Fuel capacity: 18 L (4.0 imp gal; 4.8 US gal)

The MZ Skorpion is a motorcycle made from 1994 to 2004 by MZ (MZ Motorrad- und Zweiradwerk), in former East Germany. The Scorpion is powered by a 48 brake horsepower (36 kW) four-stroke five-valve 660 cc single-cylinder engine with liquid cooling.

Skorpions are lightweight motorcycles, noted for their precise handling and excellent braking, and they remain a popular mount for club racing. Its Yamaha-based engine can be reliably tuned to 150 percent of its original performance. At that stage, it can become competitive in Supermono as well as single- and twin-cylinder or even already historic racing classes.

In their review of the Skorpion, Motorcycle News opined: "The MZ Skorpion ... proved a refreshingly able antidote to Japanese fours in the mid-to-late 90s. Light, lithe, affordable, generally reliable and reassuringly practical."

== Skorpion Cup ==
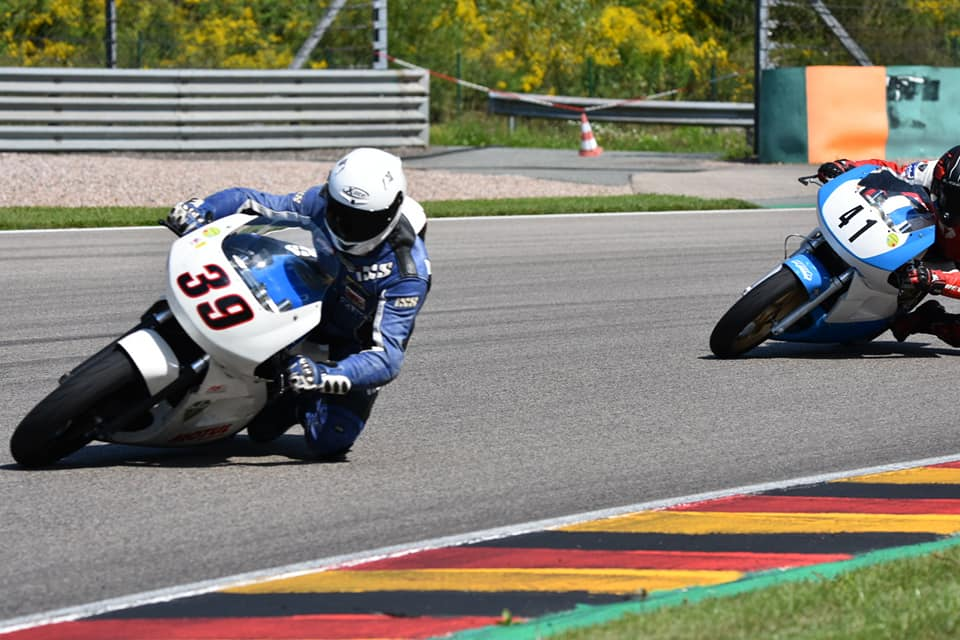
MZ-Cup – amateur racing series since 1996 (Image: Sachsenring 2020)

The Skorpion Cup got its own racing series in several countries since 1996. Based in Germany, the low-budget one-make MZ-Cup amateur racing series for un-, up to mildly tuned Skorpions celebrated its 25th jubilee in 2021. It dated 19 years after the end of the base model's production and 13 years after the factory's final closure. Presently, this makes the MZ-Cup the oldest and longest lasting one-brand and one-make cup for motorcycles worldwide. From 2022 on the MZ-Cup also opened up for off ranking guest participations of other selected single-cylinder bikes.

== Development history ==
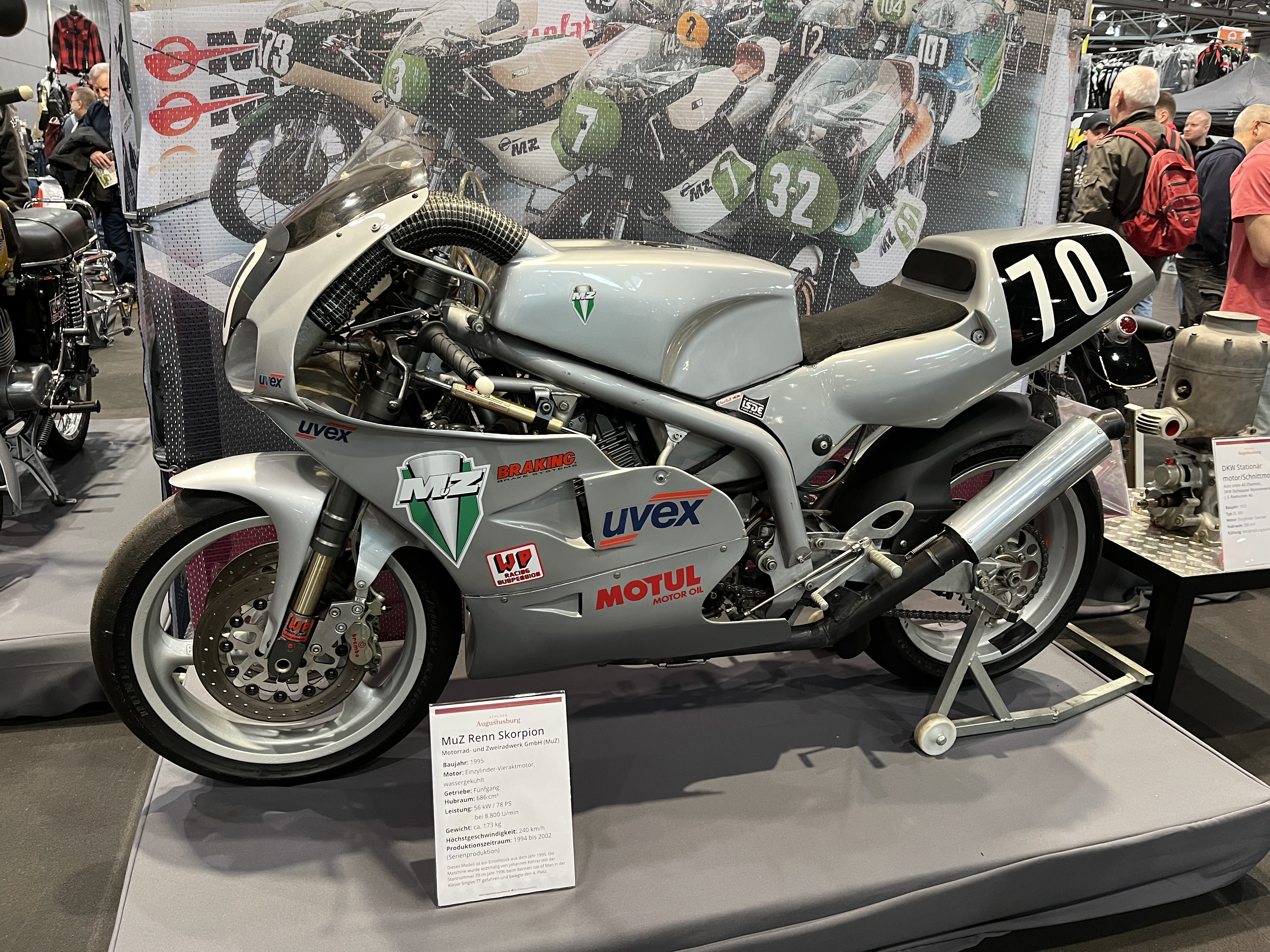
Racing version of the MZ Skorpion

The Skorpion was the result of an international collaboration, being conceived by British design firm Seymour Powell. The Skorpion's engine, electrics and switches came from the Yamaha SZR660, with Italian Grimeca parts including brakes, forks and rear suspension. Its prototypes were fitted with a lightweight 500 cc Austrian Rotax engine. The lightweight tubular beam frame was unusual in using aircraft adhesives to save weight but production versions came with a much heavier welded frame. Skorpions were well-specified as standard, with adjustable bars and footpegs, alloy wheels, stainless steel silencer, rear hugger fender, and braided brake lines.

== Model range ==
The "MuZ" Skorpion was launched in 1994 in two versions:

- Skorpion Sport, a café racer with bikini fairing, clip-on 'bars and rear-set footrests;
- Skorpion Tour, a standard motorcycle.

Both had provision for a pillion passenger, the Tour having a more comfortable dual seat. In 2001, the bikes were rebadged as "MZ", and a third model was added to the range:

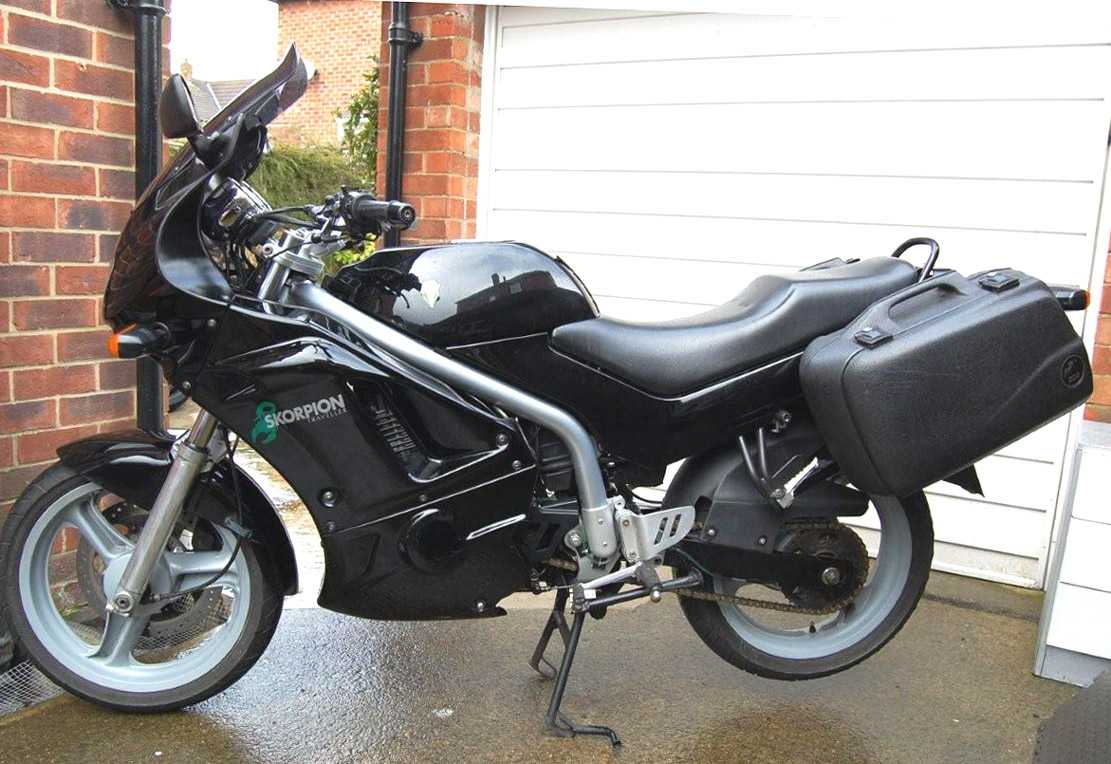
MZ Skorpion 660 Traveller

- Skorpion Traveller, a fully faired sport tourer with Hepco & Becker panniers.

The Sport was discontinued in 2002, the other models finishing in 2004.

There were two other specialist versions:

- Skorpion Cup — essentially a Skorpion Sport stripped of road paraphernalia, but with a full fairing and a single seat.
- Skorpion Replica — a rare and much more expensive version of the Cup, with a 50 bhp (37 kW) engine, upside down forks, upgraded brakes, full fairing and special frame. A version of the Replica, with a half-fairing, was also made.
