= Walter Kaaden =

German engineer (1919–1996)

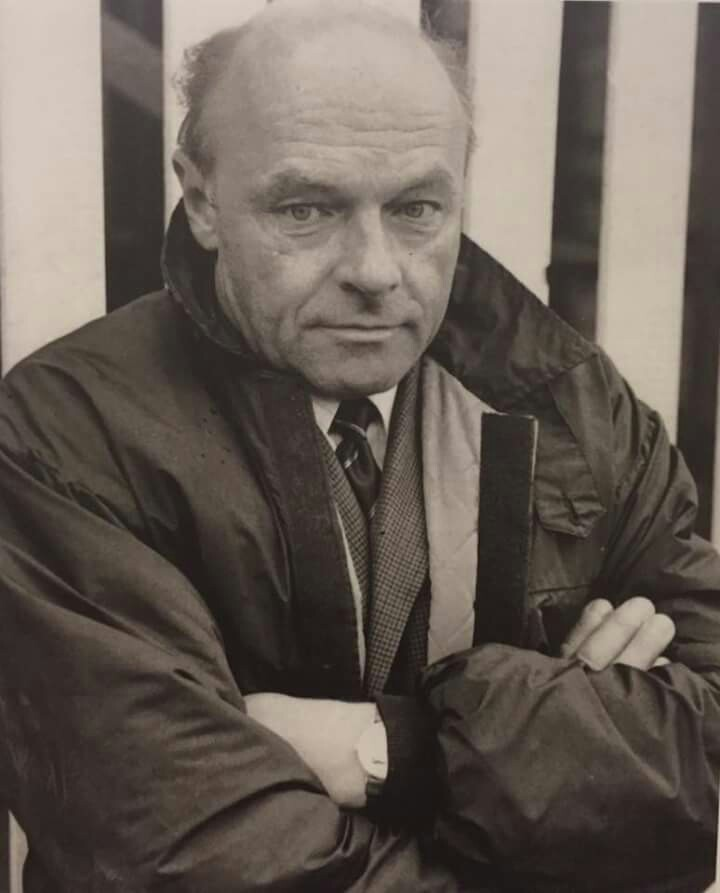
Photo of Walter Kaaden

Walter Kaaden (1 September 1919 – 3 March 1996) was a German engineer who improved the performance of two-stroke engines by understanding the role of resonance waves in the exhaust system. Working for the VEB Motorradwerk Zschopau part of the Industrieverband Fahrzeugbau (IFA), he introduced milestone improvements in two-stroke engines. His understanding of gas flow and resonance enabled him to make the first engine to achieve 200BHP/litre with his 1961 125cc racer. His motorcycle engines were ridden to 13 Grand Prix victories and a further 105 podium finishes between 1955 and 1976.

Walter Kaaden was born in Pobershau, Saxony, Germany. His father worked as chauffeur to the sales manager at the DKW factory (from 1932 onwards, part of Auto Union AG). At eight years old he attended the opening of the Nürburgring racing circuit, a formative event to which he later attributed his enthusiasm for engineering.

Kaaden studied at the Technical Academy in Chemnitz. In 1940 he joined the Henschel aircraft factory at Berlin-Schönefeld working under Herbert A. Wagner, the designer of the Hs 293 radio-guided rocket-propelled missile. Despite many reports to the contrary, Kaaden did not work on the V-1 flying bomb (the Vergeltungswaffe 1, Fieseler Fi 103) nor under Wernher von Braun on the V-2 German rocket program during the Second World War. From 4 October 1943 he worked at the Peenemünde Army Research Center on the Hs 293 project as a 'flight engineer'. But the bombing of Peenemünde in World War II on 17/18 August 1943 destroyed the facilities there. The Germans then moved missile production and testing into the secure, deep tunnel network built beneath the Harz mountains at the Mittelwerk factory, Dora-Mittelbau Concentration Camp. This is where Kaaden was transferred along with the Hs 293 project.

Kaaden was working near Dora-Mittelbau when he was captured and interned by the Americans at the end of the war. He eventually returned to Zschopau to start a timber business specialising in roof trusses that were in great demand to renovate bomb-damaged buildings. In his company's workshop, Walter Kaaden built his first racing motorcycle, based on the DKW RT 125, which he rode in local racing events.

Similarly, the independent East German engineer Daniel Zimmermann (born 1902), heavily modified a pre-war DKW RT 125 to create his radical ZPH engine. Zimmermann added a rotary disc valve that allowed asymmetric port timing with a longer duration inlet phase. Zimmermann built a new crankshaft providing 'square' bore and stroke dimensions (54mm x 54mm) and used stuffing rings to boost the primary compression ratio. Using the power of the ZPH (Zimmermann-Petruschke-Henkel) engine to contest the 1952 GDR 125cc Championship, Zimmermann's team riders, veteran Bernhard Petruschke and novice Diethart Henkel, frequently beat the riders of the government-backed IFA factory team then being managed by Kurt Kämpf.

The East German government didn't like to see its sponsored IFA team riders beaten by privateer team riders and at the end of 1952, began 'leaning' heavily on Zimmermann to reveal his engine's secrets to IFA. By February 1953, Zimmermann was finally persuaded and by March 1953, Kurt Kämpf had been moved sideways within IFA to make way for his successor, Walter Kaaden. The results of Kaaden's arrival as IFA's racing manager and a ZPH engine to copy, was the 1953 IFA factory racer featuring a rotary disc valve and many other ZPH features. This two stroke 125cc racing engine was producing 13 bhp, more than 100 bhp/litre. This engine was further developed to produce 25 bhp at 10,800rev/min.

In 1955, Kaaden turned his attention to the expansion chambers invented by Erich Wolf (the DKW designer) that had first appeared on DKW's 1951 racers. Kurt Kämpf had copied and fitted replicas of Wolf's design to the 1952 IFA racers. Working with extremely limited resources, in 1955, Kaaden developed the expansion chamber idea using an oscilloscope to examine the resonance in the exhaust system. From this he devised profiles to maximise the engine's efficiency.
