= Yamaha SZR660 =

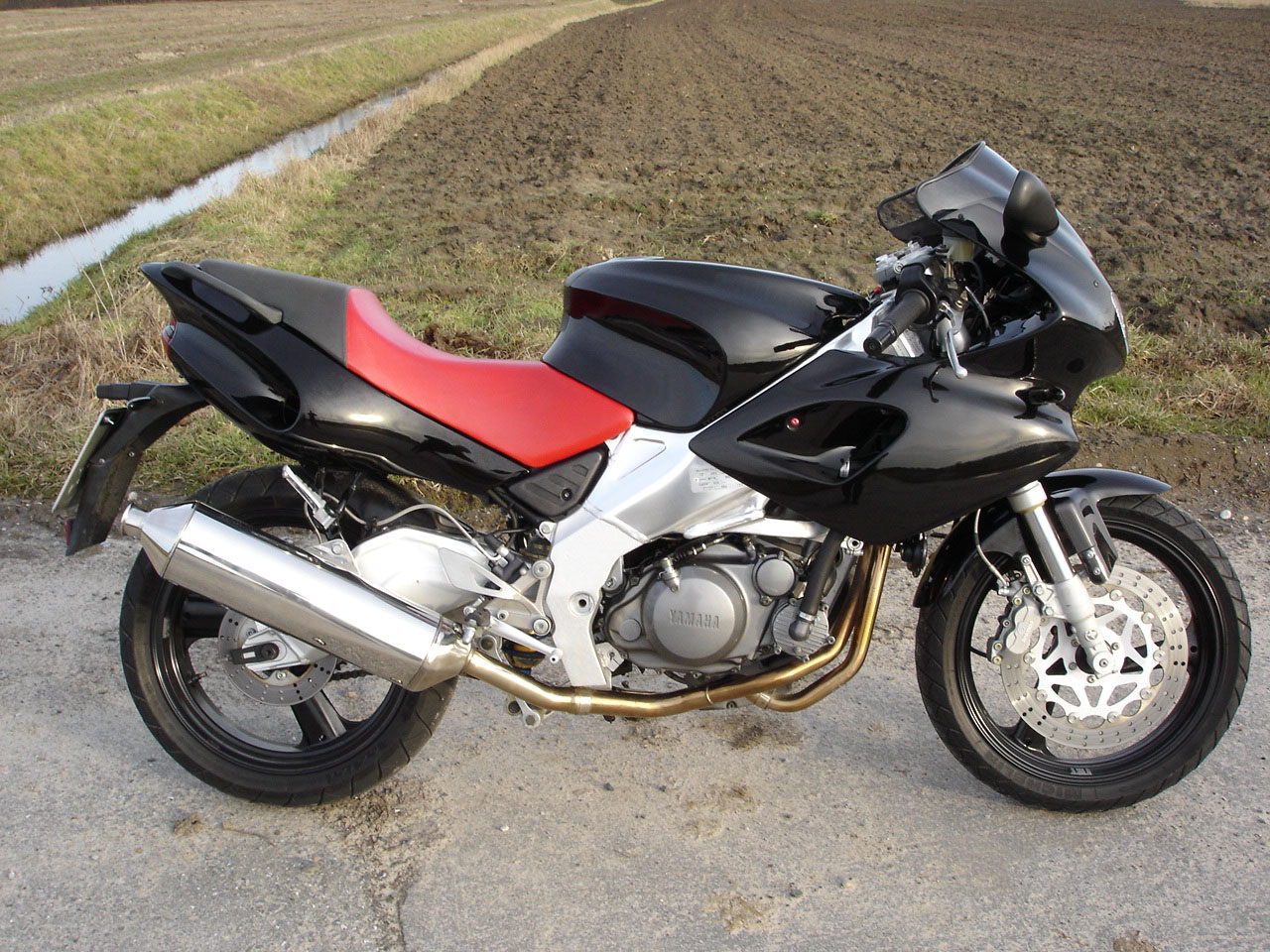
- Manufacturer: Yamaha
- Parent company: Belgarda
- Production: 1995-1996
- Predecessor: SRX600
- Class: Sport bike
- Engine: 659 cc (40.2 cu in) four-stroke, SOHC, liquid cooled, 5 valve, single bore and stroke 100 x 84mm
- Transmission: 5 speed
- Brakes: 320mm Brembo, with 4 piston Brembo caliper
- Tires: Front 110/60 R 17 Rear 150/60 R 17
- Rake, trail: 24 degrees, 102mm
- Wheelbase: 1410mm
- Dimensions: L: 2,040 mm (80 in); W: 740 mm (29 in); H: 1,140 mm (45 in)
- Seat height: 770 mm (30 in)
- Weight: 159 kg (351 lb) (dry)
- Fuel capacity: 14 litres

Yamaha SZR660 is a sport bike. It has a 659 cc (40.2 cu in) single-cylinder engine, produced by Yamaha Motor Corporation from 1996 to 2001. It was built in Italy by the Italian Yamaha importer Belgarda. It shares its engine with Yamaha's XTZ660 Ténéré line of dual-purpose on/off-road motorcycles, but employs this engine within a Supermono package.

== Engine ==
The 660 engine incorporates a five-valve cylinder-head. There are three intake and two exhaust valves. The bike is designed so that the smaller valves have a larger area at a lower weight than a four valve system and allow maximum intake flow and velocity.

== Fuel system ==
A fuel pump is mounted on the bottom of the fuel tank to lift the contents of the tank to the twin carburettors. The fuel system incorporates one slide carb and one butterfly carb. These are operated sequentially by a manually adjustable system.
