= Gavin Trippe =

American motorcycle racing promoter

- Born: 1940; Norfolk, England
- Died: 2 July 2018 (aged 77–78); California
- Occupations: Motorcycle racing promoter and publisher
- Organization(s): President of Trippe-Cox Associates, Inc.
- Awards: Motorcycle Hall of Fame (2005)

Gavin Trippe (1940 – 2 July 2018) was a motorcycle racing promoter, journalist, and publisher who was inducted to the Motorcycle Hall of Fame in 2005. He died following an automobile accident in California.

Trippe was a motorcycling journalist in the UK until he founded a motorcycling magazine, Motor Cycle Weekly, in the United States in 1969. In the early 1970s he brought European style motocross racing to the US by founding the Carlsbad USGP. Trippe was also the creator of supermoto racing, which attracted a large US television audience from 1979–1985, and had a resurgence, first in Europe and then beyond, since the early 2000s. Since 2007 Trippe worked to create a single cylinder racing class with low barriers to entry for amateur racers and young riders.

== Publications ==
After working for the British publication Motor Cycle News, he co-founded, with Bruce Cox, Motor Cycle Weekly in America in 1969. Motor Cycle Weekly ceased publication in 1975. He wrote "The Spoken Wheel" column for the online publication Motorcycle USA.

== Race classes ==
Trippe started the Carlsbad United States Grand Prix in 1973, and invented supermoto in 1979. Trippe also helped create the AMA Superbike Championship in 1976. Other events Trippe promoted included the Trans-AMA motocross series, the Trans-Atlantic Match Races, and Ascot half-mile dirt track racing. In 2007 he proposed a new American single cylinder class based on the success of European supermono.

=== Carlsbad United States Grand Prix ===
Trippe introduced European-style 500 cc motocross racing to the US in the early 1970s, creating an event at Carlsbad, California which grew into a major international venue. The 1971 motocross race at Carlsbad Raceway attracted 21,000 spectators and 15 million television viewers. In 1973, his company, Trippe-Cox Associates, secured the sponsorship of leisure apparel maker Hang Ten International, and the event became the Hang Ten Carlsbad United States Grand Prix (USGP), run under the auspices of the American Motorcyclist Association (AMA), and sanctioned as a Grand Prix event by the Fédération Internationale de Motocyclisme (FIM). It was the 7th round of the 1973 Trans-AMA, the only US event at the time to pay points in the FIM World 500 cc Championship. For the race, Trippe-Cox Associates made improvements to the Carlsbad facility, including new water sprinklers, fencing, spectator bridges and billboards. The series proved commercially successful, with a significant television audience. For second year of the event, 1974, the course was lengthened by ¼ mile, to 1 1/2 miles (2.4 km), with the new section having a left turning uphill corner followed by a sharp right turn into a ravine. The 1974 purse grew to US$30,000, and 60 riders from 13 countries competed in the race, by then the eighth stop on the race circuit earning points to the 500 cc championship.

Carlsbad was the oldest venue of the US motocross season's main events until the last USGP there in 1986. Motocross popularity declined in the 90s, and by 1995 there was no motocross Grand Prix in the US, until the FIM championship returned in 2010. In 1984 Trippe began to worry that development was encroaching on Carlsbad Raceway, and that the site would be sold when his lease expired.

=== Supermoto ===
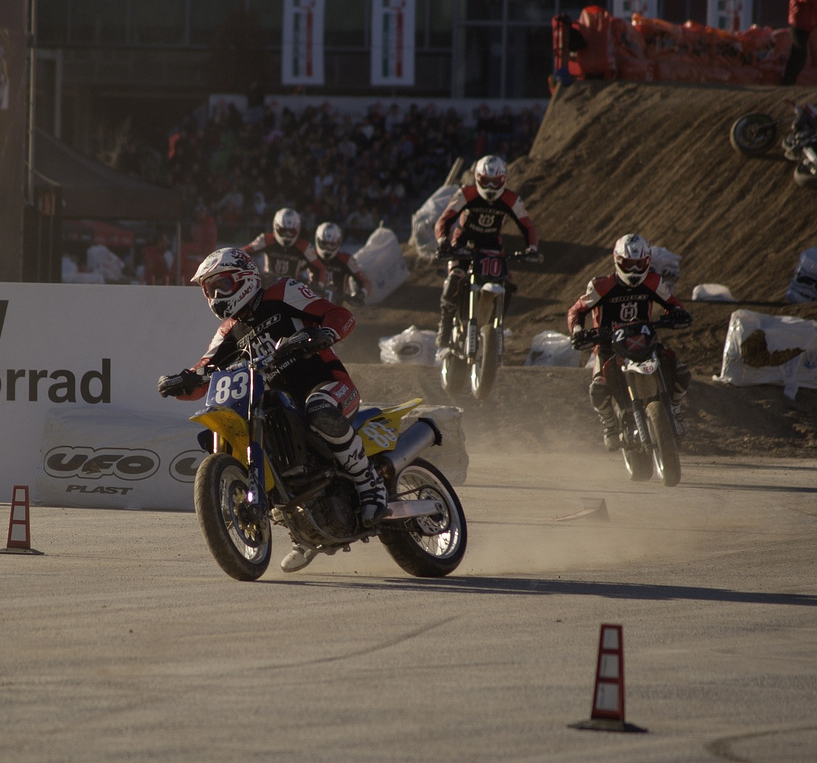
The transition from dirt to pavement at a supermoto event at EICMA

Trippe was the inventor and early promoter of supermoto, which combines on a single course three genres of motorcycle racing: the hard-packed, flat dirt of track racing, the uneven obstacles and jumps of motocross, and the high speed straights and turns of paved road racing. The original purpose was to find out who was the best overall motorcycle racer from the three disciplines. Trippe built first course at Carlsbad Raceway. The machines are motocross-style motorcycles, but with smoother, road race style tires, though in the beginning 750 cc Harley-Davidson flat trackers competed as well.

The seed of the idea for Superbikers began was when reporter Bob Iger asked Trippe at a motocross event why Kenny Roberts wasn't competing, and Trippe replied, puzzled, "Because he is a road racer." Trippe began thinking that, "The huge mass doesn't know the difference between dirt track, motocross and road racing." The ten best riders from each discipline, motocross, dirt track and road racing, would be race together because, "All these riders know one another and respect one another, but they never race one another. This is a way we can pitch them all in together. We've tried to lay out a course where all branches will be competitive," said Trippe. Motocross riders won five of the first six Superbikers championships, promoting Trippe to consider changing the course to have less off-road and more paved stretches to give the track and the road riders a better shot.

He trademarked it as "Superbikers" and was one of the original promoters of the Superbikers segment on ABC's Wide World of Sports from 1979–1985. Besides combining road racing with dirt racing, Superbikers brought together top riders from different specialties, like an all-star game. After the end of Superbikers television run, supermoto declined in the US but grew in Europe, until 2003 when AMA Pro Racing began a supermoto championship.

=== Formula 450 series ===
Trippe proposed the creation of a new US single cylinder road racing class based on repurposed 450 cc (27 cu in) motocross bikes. It was to be called "Super Single" but later the proposed name was changed to Formula 450, or F450. Trippe had been lobbying for the creation of a Formula 450 class because it would be more affordable to rookie and under-21-year-old riders, compared to 600 cc supersport sport bike racing. He said, "Formula 450 is a great way to encourage young riders. It's back-to-basics racing, emphasizing riding skill over horsepower, and you don't need a six-figure sponsorship just to make the grid." One reviewer described the machines as, "a single cylinder 450 cc dirt bike that's been converted into an entry-level road racer. The frame, subframe, swing arm, motor and transmission are all stock, but the wheels, tires, suspension and bodywork have all been modified for on-track use and general skulduggery."

After a few years of development and testing, Formula 450s became motocross bikes which had been converted to road racing by installing 17-inch wheels, larger front brakes, clip on handlebars and aerodynamic fairings. Replacing the forks with parts from supersport sport bikes was unsuccessful because the forks were too short, leading to too little trail. Instead the stock motocross front and rear suspension components were kept, but reconfigured. According to Trippe, the cost of preparing such a bike was under US$10,000 and tires last three race weekends, longer than a 600 cc class supersport.

For the 2009 season, the United States Grand Prix Racers Union (USGPRU) club-level racing organisation added a Formula 450 class on a trial basis to five of their rounds, to test the prototype motorcycles and gauge interest in adding the class. The USGPRU also published a detailed technical account of how to build Formula 450 racer from a donor motocross bike. Formula 450 was not run in 2010 or scheduled for 2011.

Inspired by Trippe's development and promotion of this idea, the AMA announced in July 2009 there would be a single cylinder series to be called Formula 450, but as a spec series, with identical bikes built, owned, and maintained by single manufacturer provided to all riders, rather than bikes adapted by riders from motocross bikes. Two months later, AMA Pro Road Racing announced that the new class would be called GT3, an expansion of the SunTrust Moto-GT.
