= MZ RT 125 =

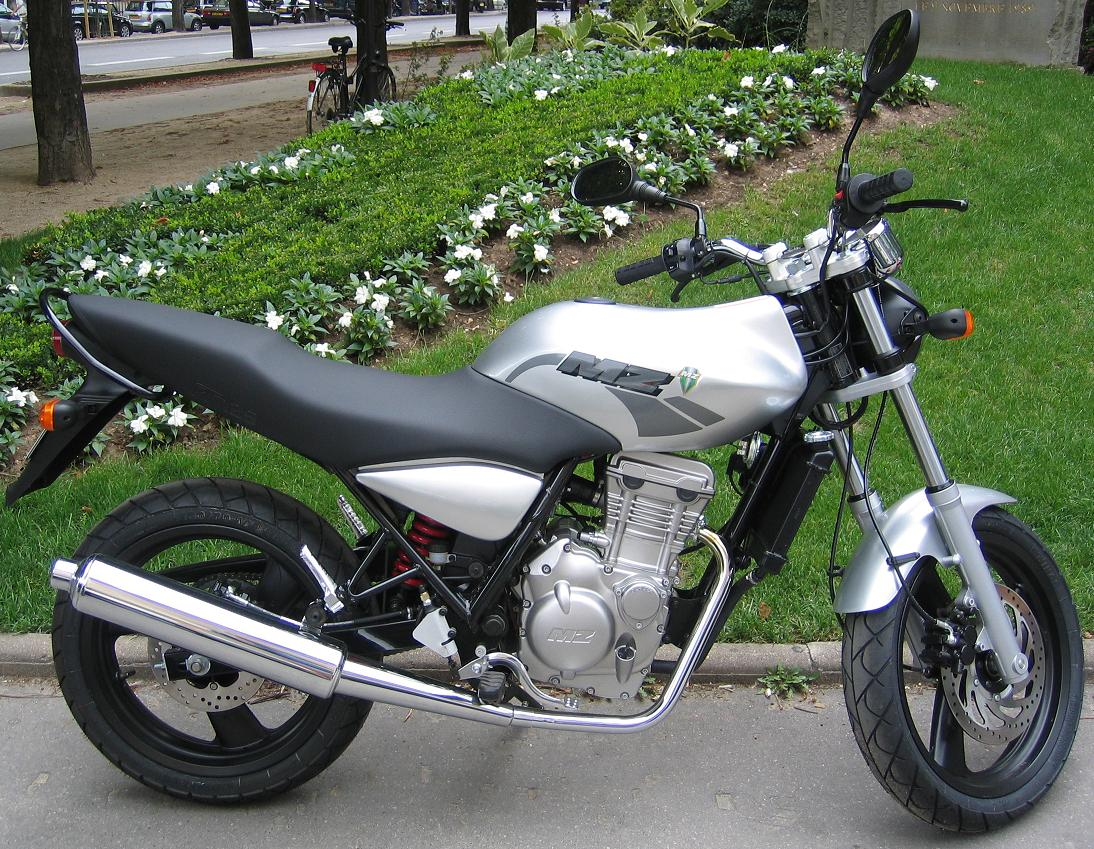
- Manufacturer: MZ Motorrad- und Zweiradwerk GmbH
- Production: 2000−2008
- Engine: → see table

The MZ RT 125 is a motorcycle that was built by the MZ Motorrad- und Zweiradwerk GmbH, in Zschopau from 2000 to 2008.

The name RT refers to the name of the popular RT series, which was manufactured from 1934 to 1965, first by the Auto Union AG at the DKW main plant in Zschopau and after the end of the Second World War (partly in parallel) by IFA/MZ in the GDR at the old location and by the newly founded Auto Union GmbH in Ingolstadt in the Federal Republic.

== History and Technical details ==
After DKW and MZ had produced exclusively two-stroke motorcycles in the 125 cc class until 1992, and the driving license regulations in the Federal Republic of Germany only permitted 80 cc for small motorcycles, in 1996 the new regulations for driving license class A1 permitted 125 cc and a maximum of 11 kW, while the top speed for drivers under 18 years of age remained limited to 80 km/h. After several studies conducted by MZ starting in 1996, the decision was made in 1997 to develop a completely new motorcycle for the class, whose four-stroke engine would maximize within the framework of the law. Designer Masanori Hiraide was responsible for the design, with its striking curved tank.

The engine has a speed limit of 10,750 rpm. The maximum speed limit, which was in effect until 2013 for A1 license holders up to their 18th birthday, was not achieved by throttling the engine, as is usually the case, but rather by using a speed sensor. This allows the engine to develop its full power until the electronic limit is reached.

In the years 2002 to 2006, the model ranked among the 15 most popular light motorcycles in terms of new registrations in Germany, despite low and declining sales figures.

== Specifications ==
	MZ RT 125	MZ RT 125 Classic
Production	2000–2008	
Engine	liquid-cooled single cylinder four-stroke engine, electric start	
Valvetrain	Dual overhead camshaft (DOHC), 4 valves	
Bore × Stroke	60 mm × 44 mm (2.4 in × 1.7 in)	
Displacement	124.4 cc (7.59 cu in)	
Compression ratio	11 : 1	
Power rating	15 PS (11 kW) at 9000/min	
max. Torque	11.7 N⋅m (8.6 lbf⋅ft) at 8500/min	
Introduction of fuel	carburetor (Mikuni VM 24)	
Lubrication	forced lubrication	
Ignition system	contactless capacitor ignition	
Alternator	Alternating current generator, 180 W at 5000 rpm	
Battery	12 V – 9 Ah	
On-board voltage	12 V	
Clutch	multi-disk clutch in oil bath, mechanically operated	
Transmission	6-speed helical gearbox, claw-switched	
Frame	single cradle steel frame	
Dimension (L × W × H)	1,950 mm × 700 mm × 1,080 mm (77 in × 28 in × 43 in)	
Wheelbase	1,445 mm (56.9 in)	
Seat height	770 mm (30 in)	
Front suspension	telescopic fork, hydraulically damped suspension 130 mm (5.1 in)	
Rear suspension	swingarm, suspension 200 mm (7.9 in), adjustable spring base	
Front rim size	cast-wheel, 2.75 x 17″	wire-spoke wheel, 3.00 x 17″
Rear rim size	cast wheel, 4.00 x 17″	wire-spoke wheel, 4.00 x 17″
Front tire	110/70-17	
Rear tire	130/70-17	
Front brake	single-disc brake, Ø 280 mm (11 in), dual piston	
Rear brake	single-disc brake, Ø 220 mm (8.7 in), dual piston	
Curb weight	131 kg (289 lb) to 133 kg (293 lb)	
Maximum load	320 kg (710 lb)	
Fuel capacity	13.5 l (reserve: 1.5 l)	
Top speed	108 km/h (67 mph)	

== MZ Striker ==
In addition to the two production models, there was a special model, the "Striker." Unlike the RT 125, it featured flat handlebars, the tank and front fender were painted orange and reached a maximum speed of 174 km/h. In addition, the sliding tubes of the telescopic fork and the two side panels were painted matt black, and the front brake caliper was painted gold.

== Sources ==
- René Zapf (2012), Made in Zschopau. Motorräder mit Herz (in German), Chemnitz: Chemnitzer Verlag, pp. 130–139, 191, ISBN 978-3-937025-86-5
