= Supermono =

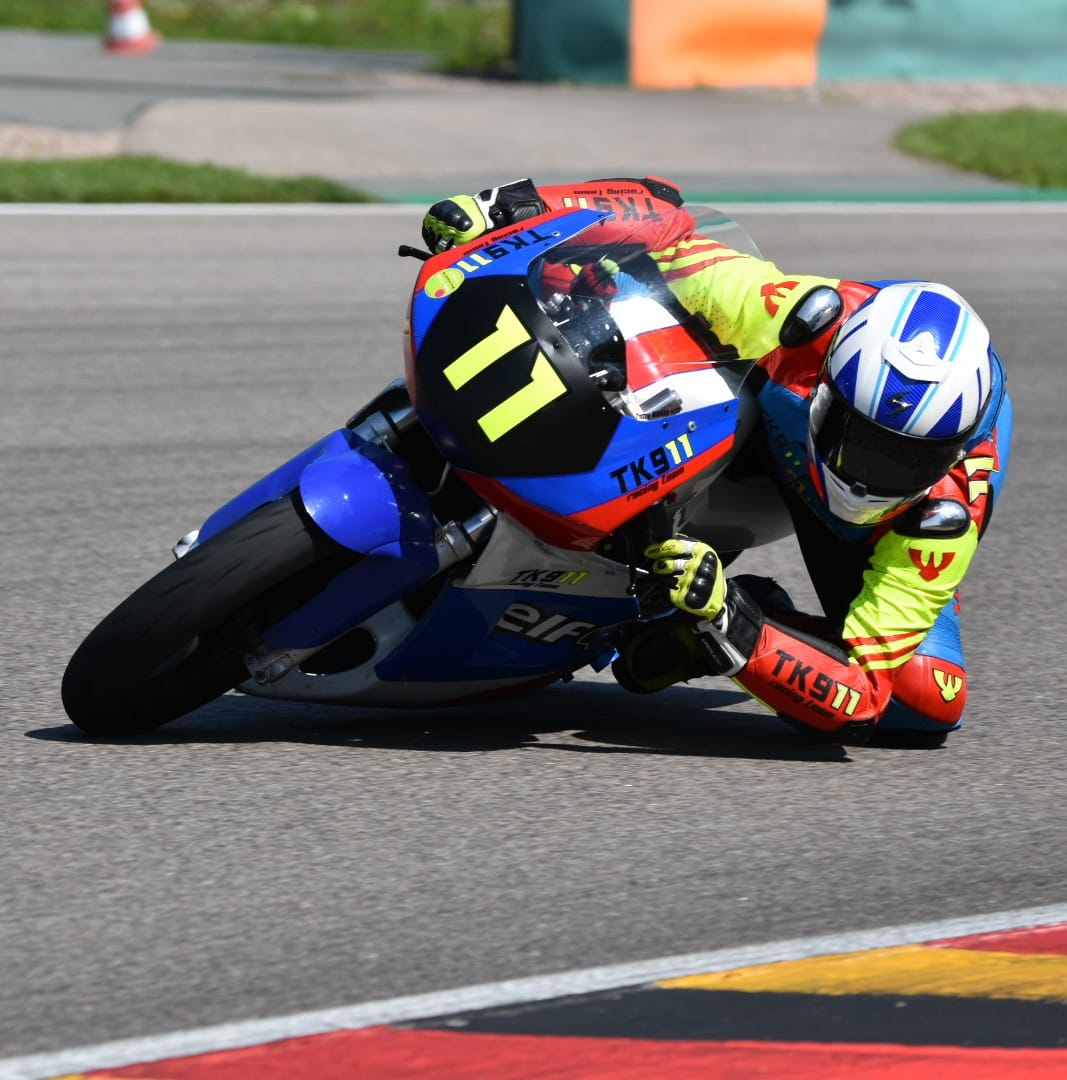
MZ-Cup - Supermono amateur competition series with MZ Skorpion since 1996 (Sachsenring 2020)

Supermono is a class in European motorcycle road racing. Supermono class machines have a single-cylinder engine with a maximum displacement of 800 cc. The British Supermono series allows "unlimited" engine size, but this involves keeping under the ACU accepted size of 1300cc.

In contrast to F450 (or Super Single) machines, Supermono machines use most of the donor bike (usually small and agile race bikes) and swap out the engine for that of a modern 450cc dirt bike.

== See also ==
- Formula 450 series
