= Einheits-PKW der Wehrmacht =

German car and light truck family

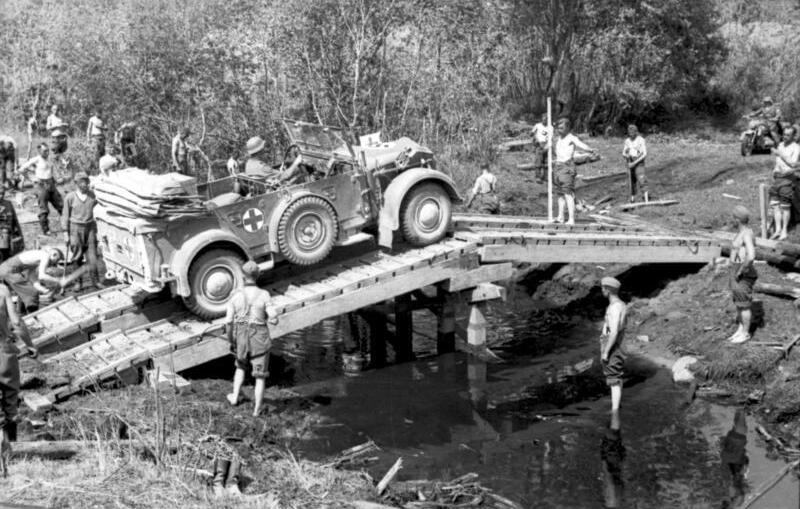
Medium off-road passenger car, older version with free spinning spare support wheels on each side.

Einheits-Pkw der Wehrmacht – literally: "standard passenger motor-car of the Wehrmacht" – was Nazi Germany's plan for a new, multi-purpose fleet of all wheel drive off-road vehicles, based on just three uniform chassis, specifically designed and built for the Wehrmacht (the Nazi military). The plan was formulated in 1934, and vehicles were built from 1936 to 1943. This vehicle was manufactured by Ford and Horch.

The whole program yielded some 60,000 four-wheel drive, off-road capable passenger cars, totaled across three weight-classes, plus about 13,000 6x6 trucks of 2.5 metric tons load capacity – but many of the 4x4 'Einheits' - passenger cars were deemed unfit for war-time service by the Wehrmacht internally, by 1938 – before World War Two had even started.

The new, standardised military vehicles were intended to replace the diverse fleet of two-wheel drive, militarized civilian vehicles previously procured by the Reichswehr – the Weimar Republic (1918–1933) predecessor of the Wehrmacht – with new cross-country mobile vehicles for military requirements in order to simplify logistics, maintenance and training by using standardized components.

The three main classes Leichter Einheits-Pkw, Mittlerer Einheits-Pkw, and Schwerer Einheits-Pkw (light, medium, and heavy standardized cars) were planned to use uniform chassis and mechanicals according to their weights and payloads, and each chassis would carry a number of different bodies for different purposes – similar to, but preceding the concepts of the U.S. made Dodge WC series, or the later High-Mobility, Multipurpose Wheeled Vehicles (HMMWV / Humvee). The lightest of the three classes was also intended to serve as the U.S. 1/4-ton jeeps did.

Because of the insufficiently developed German automotive industry at that time, Hitler initiated the plan such that multiple small to medium size manufacturers should cooperate to manufacture the vehicles within each weight class, supplying uniform components (chassis, engines, bodies) as much as possible. However, the program was very ambitious (initially demanding not only independent suspension, but also four-wheel steering), which led to overly complex designs and meant that the program never came close to achieving its goals. As early as 1938, Hitler tasked Ferdinand Porsche to develop a better light, standardized, and sufficiently off-road capable car, using as much Volkswagen technology as possible: the VW Kübelwagen.

== Development ==
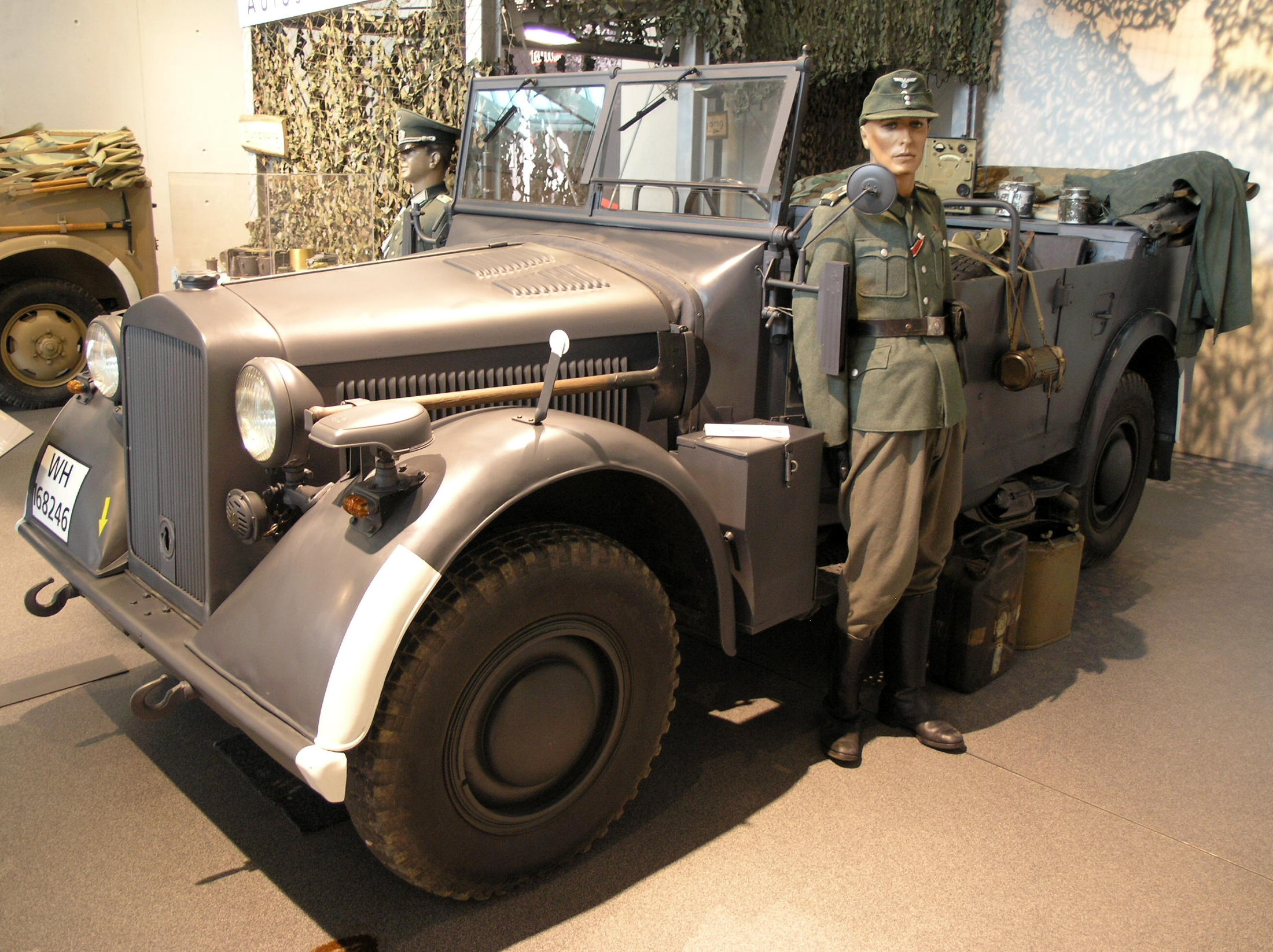
The 'mittlerer' (medium) Horch / Wanderer 901 was the most common variant of the various Einheits-Pkw. Here: 'Typ(e) 40' in the August Horch Museum Zwickau.

Early on in the process of motorising the German military before World War II, first the Reichswehr, and then the Wehrmacht had procured militarised versions of many different makes and models of civilian passenger cars. Therefore, the Wehrmacht's inventory of passenger cars was unsatisfactory in a number of respects when open German re-armament began in 1935. On the one hand, the existing vehicles' cross-country mobility and durability were not up to military requirements. On the other, their maintenance and parts supply were highly complex due to a large number of different makes, models, and often even model generations.

After the Nazi takeover of power, they rapidly increased funding for the mechanisation of the military, and in 1934, launched a development program for standardised chassis. It strove to achieve maximum cross-country mobility and extensive standardisation of parts while employing the latest innovations in automotive engineering at the design stage in order to keep the cars in production for many years to come. Five types were initially planned:

- Leichter geländegängiger Personenkraftwagen (le. gl. Pkw) 'light off-road passenger car'
- Mittelschwerer geländegängiger Personenkraftwagen (m. gl. Pkw) 'medium off-road passenger car'
- Schwerer geländegängiger Personenkraftwagen (s. gl. Pkw) 'heavy off-road passenger car'
- Leichter geländegängiger Lastkraftwagen (le. gl. Lkw) 'light off-road truck'
- Mittelschwerer geländegängiger Lastkraftwagen (m. gl. Lkw) 'medium off-road truck'

Among other features, all types were required to have four-wheel drive, independent suspension, and use domestic raw materials as stipulated by the Four Year Plan. The German automotive industry though was still in its infancy at the time, compromising the desired standardisation right from the start. No single manufacturer was able to supply the required number of cars on its own. Several manufacturers were therefore charged with production, each of which was supposed to comply with the same standardised plans: BMW (Werk Eisenach), Hanomag, Stoewer, Opel (Werk Brandenburg), Ford Germany as well as Auto Union (Horch and Wanderer). However, these companies in turn outsourced production of a large quantity of the individual components to their different third-party suppliers. Also, each of them used engines from its own line-up of civilian models, so the engines were not standardised from the outset.

The chassis of the heavy off-road passenger car was also used for the Leichter Panzerspähwagen (Sd.Kfz. 221 and Sd.Kfz. 222) armoured cars, although its engine was mounted in the rear.

The first light off-road passenger cars were delivered by Stoewer in 1936 (R 180 Spezial), followed in 1937 by the first medium and in 1938 by the first heavy models. The weaknesses of the programme quickly became obvious - high costs, complex production and overstrained manufacturers unable to supply sufficient numbers of vehicles to fill all the slots of the receiving military units as planned. The Wehrmacht therefore still had to source 60% of their requirements elsewhere - converting standard civilian cars to military use, euphemistically terming them Ergänzungsfahrzeuge ('supplementary vehicles'), as well as employing requisitioned and captured civilian cars. This in turn led to many disadvantages with maintenance, supply and training.

Enquiries with the different branches of the military revealed that the Einheits-Pkw were also flawed designs largely unfit for wartime service. Not even the simplifications implemented on bodies and chassis in 1940 (Typ 40), without the complex four-wheel steering among others, succeeded in remedying the multitude of shortcomings. Their complex designs and excessive wear and tear aside, all types were mainly criticised for their high weight, which in turn meant a high fuel consumption and led to many broken frames and suspensions in the field. Accordingly, production of the three types ceased in 1942, 1943, and 1941, respectively.

== Types ==
=== Leichter geländegängiger Pkw ===
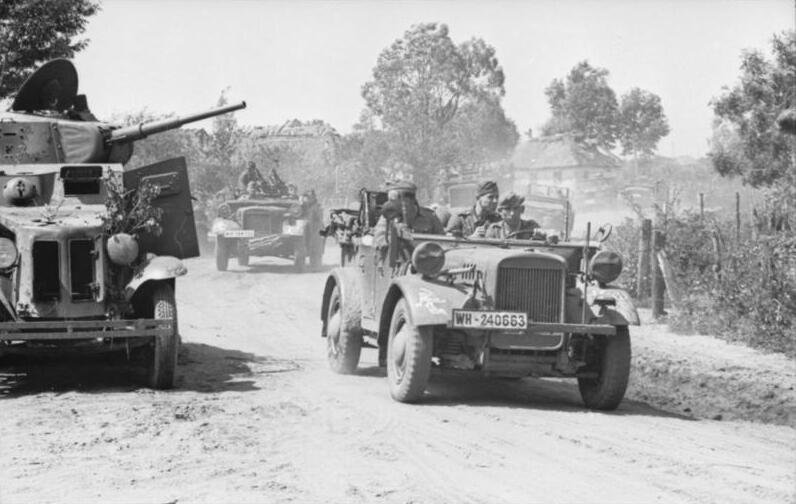
Light 4WD off-road passenger car

The light off-road passenger car was built by the BMW-Werk Eisenach under the designation BMW 325, as well as Hanomag (Typ 20 B) and Stoewer (Typ R 180 Spezial). The vehicles were used as troop carriers (Kfz. 1), by repair-and-maintenance squads (Kfz. 2/40), by artillery reconnaissance sonic measurement squads (Kfz. 3) and by troop-level aerial defence (Kfz. 4). Between 14.525 and 17.521 units were built. Between 1940 and 1943, only Stoewer continued to build the R 200 Spezial without the four-wheel steering (Typ 40). The cars weighed 1,775 kg empty (1,700 kg without the four-wheel steering). 90% of all military branches rejected the vehicle as "unfit for wartime service" in a 1942 enquiry, while the much simpler, lighter and cheaper Volkswagen Kübelwagen proved to be far superior in basically every respect.

=== Mittelschwerer geländegängiger Pkw ===
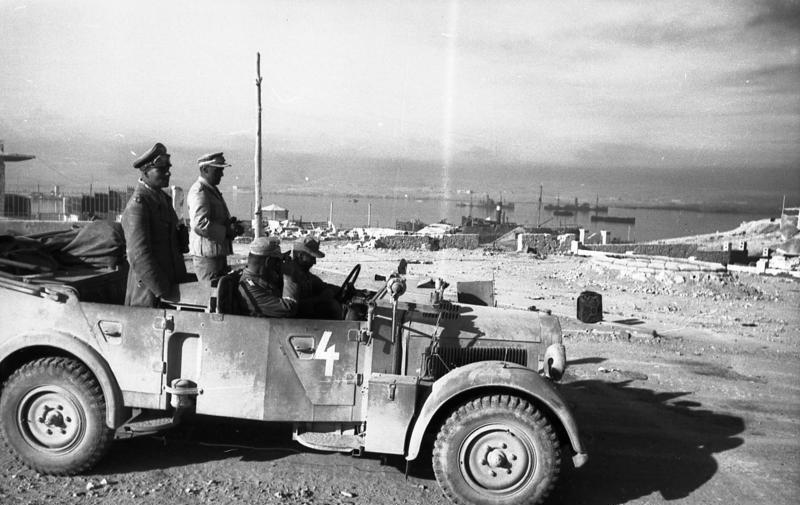
Erwin Rommel and Fritz Bayerlein in Type 40 medium off-road passenger car with inside spare, Tobruk 1942.

The medium off-road (passenger) cars were mainly built by Auto Union's Siegmar factory (former Wanderer) in Siegmar-Schönau (today a part of Chemnitz), and its Horch factory in Zwickau. Opel's new 1935 Brandenburg factory also contributed several thousand chassis, and some 6,000 engines for Wanderer-built cars. The Wehrmacht used the medium cars as troop transports (types Kfz. 11, or with a tow bar: Kfz. 12, and 6-seat version: Kfz. 21); in the signals corps (Kfz. 15, Kfz. 17, Kfz. 17/1) and for artillery reconnaissance (Kfz. 16 and Kfz. 16/1). Some 14,900 units were built as Horch 901, and between 12,298 and 16,000 as Wanderer 901 / Typ(e) 40, plus (deduced from Opel chassis serial numbers) at least 3,860 Opel Typ(e) mPl, making some 31,000 to 35,000 units in total.

The most conspicuous change of the 1940 design simplification was the elimination of the mid-mounted spare wheels which simplified the bodywork and gave more interior space. The cars had a Horch V8 (Opel: in-line 6-cylinder) and a curb weight of 2,700 kg (open-topped Horch version: 3,080 kg) and was the only type that did not even initially have four-wheel steering. 80% of military branches rejected the vehicle as unfit for wartime service.

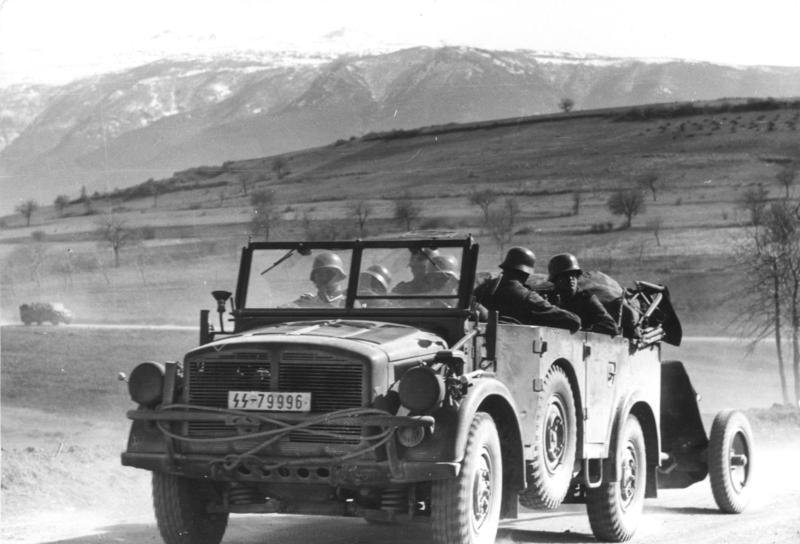
Heavy off-road car – early version with spare wheels in each side.

=== Schwerer geländegängiger Pkw ===
The heavy off-road passenger car was built by Horch in Zwickau and Ford Germany in Cologne, each using their own V8 engines. They were used by the signals corps (Kfz. 23 and 24), as ambulances (Kfz. 31), as artillery tractors for light artillery (Kfz. 69) and anti-aircraft guns (Kfz. 81), as troop carriers (Kfz. 70) and as a carrier of AA searchlights (Kfz. 83). Furthermore, the armoured troop carrier Sd.Kfz. 247 and the rear-engined Leichter Panzerspähwagen armoured car in all its versions used the same chassis. Various versions of the Horch totaled 8,135 units, and 1,901 Ford models were built, for a total of just over 10,000 units.

The cars had an empty weight of 3,300 kg with four-wheel steering, and 3,200 kg without. Like the others, the heavy type lost the four-wheel steering along with the mid-mounted spare wheels in 1940. Although it suffered from the same deficiencies initially mentioned, as well as heavy steering, it appears to have been the most successful type of the standardised off-road passenger car programme.

=== Leichter geländegängiger LKW ===
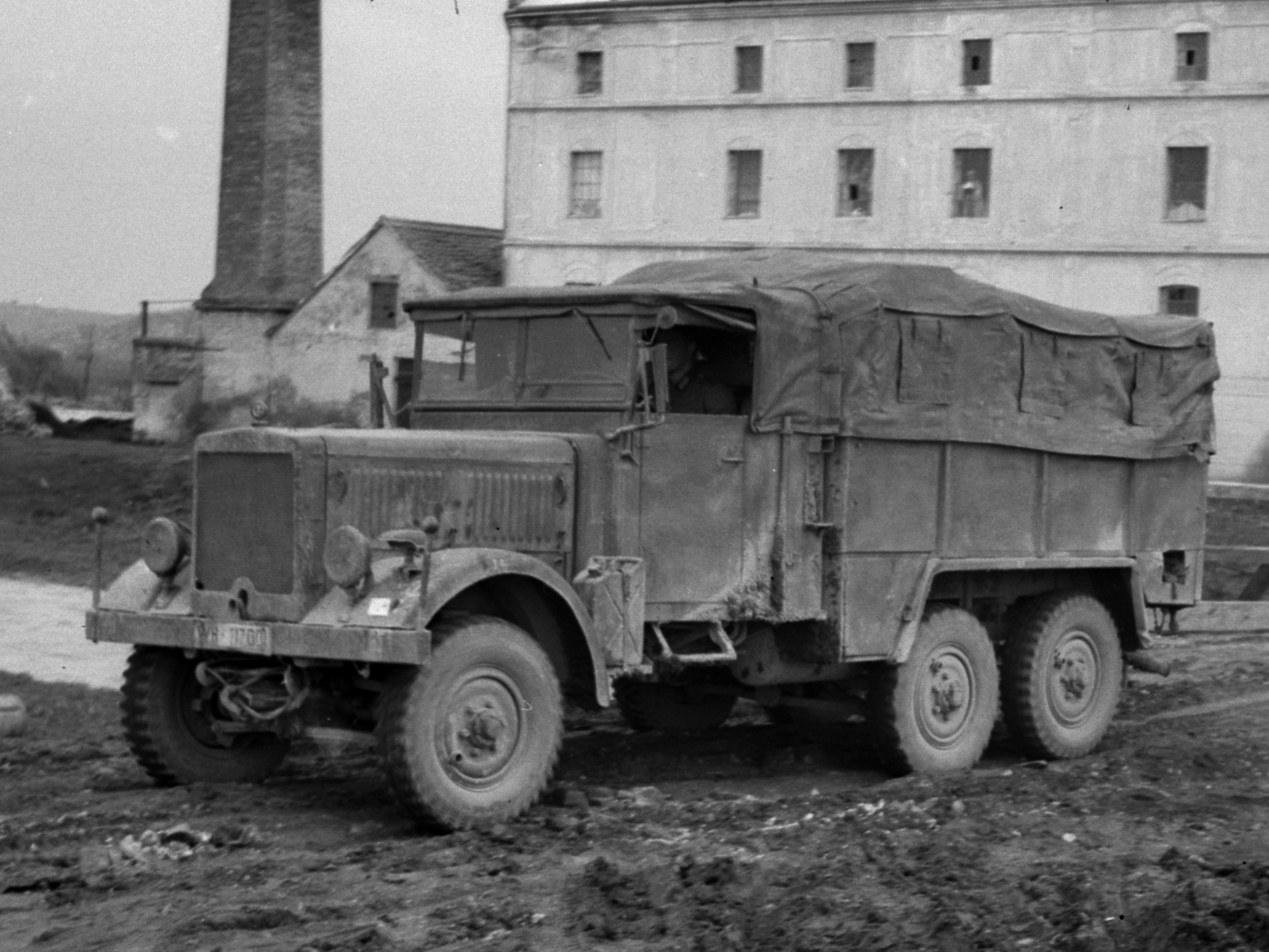
German WW II "Einheitsdiesel" / standard 2.5 ton (metric) off-road truck.

Development of standardised trucks (Einheits-Lastkraftwagen) for the German military started in 1934. They originally wanted three standard chassis with two, three, and four driven axles, all with large, single wheels and off-road payload capacities of 1.5, 2.5 and four metric tons respectively. Four prototype units of the four-axle, eight-wheel variant were built and later repurposed for special duty. In the end, only the three-axle, six-wheeled, 2.5 ton variant entered series production and was manufactured from 1937 through 1940. Its full official designation became: leichter geländegängiger Lastkraftwagen, offen (light cross-country lorry, open(-cab)). Commonly, they were often just called the 'Einheitsdiesel' (standard diesels).

Henschel led the development and built all the chassis. An 80 Hp diesel engine was developed by MAN in cooperation with Henschel and Humboldt-Deutz-Motoren company. MAN manufactured all the engine blocks. The trucks had a four-speed manual gearbox, coupled to a two-stage transfer case, and a lockable center differential, sending power to all three axles, each of which had an additional self-locking differential.

The Leichter geländegängiger Lastkraftwagen (abbreviated as 'le. gl. Lkw'), for "Light off-road capable Lorry/truck", had large single wheels with off-road tyres and independent suspension all around. Although nine manufacturers were involved in their production, they were actually built to identical specifications, in part because just one single supplier built all the chassis (Henschel) and one other built all the engine blocks (MAN). Despite a good reputation as very off-road capable, durable and reliable, the Einheitsdiesel had a disappointing payload relative to its own empty weight of about five tons, and several other drawbacks when compared to light trucks like the standard commercial Opel Blitz models and the Borgward B 3000. High weight and low production numbers both resulted from its complex design, and the trucks were relatively sensitive to overloading and other typical wartime abuse. Assembled by Borgward, Büssing-NAG, Daimler-Benz, FAUN, Henschel, Krupp, Magirus, MAN, and Vomag, production was halted in 1940, after about 12,000 to 14,300 units.

== Specifications ==
Einheits-Pkw der Wehrmacht
	Light (le. E. Pkw)	Medium (m. E. Pkw)	Heavy (s. E. Pkw)	Light standard truck (le. gl. Lkw)
Manufacturers:	Stoewer, BMW, Hanomag	Auto Union, Opel	Auto Union, Ford	Borgward, Büssing-NAG, Daimler-Benz, Faun, Henschel, Krupp, Magirus, MAN, Vomag
Production period:	1936 - 1942	1937 - 1943	1938 - 1941	1937 – 1940
Length:	390 cm (12 ft 10 in)	470 cm (15 ft 5 in)	484 cm (15 ft 11 in)	585 cm (19 ft 2 in)
Width:	169 cm (5 ft 7 in)	186 cm (6 ft 1 in)	200 cm (6 ft 7 in)	220 cm (7 ft 3 in)
Height:	190 cm (6 ft 3 in)	207 cm (6 ft 9 in)	204 cm (6 ft 8 in)	240 cm (7 ft 10 in)
Maximum weight:	2.2t	3.0t	4.0t	7.3t
Payload:	500 kg (1,100 lb)	600 kg (1,300 lb) (Funkwagen radio car: 980 kg (2,160 lb))	1,000 kg (2,200 lb) (Type 40 1,100 kg (2,400 lb))	2,500 kg (5,500 lb)
Ground clearance:	23.5 cm (9.3 in)	24 cm (9.4 in)	25 cm (9.8 in)	–
Wheelbase:	240 cm (94 in)	300 cm (120 in)	280 cm (110 in)	–
Track width:	140 cm (55 in)	140 cm (55 in)	160 cm (63 in)	–
Engine:	Stoewer "AW 2" 4-cyl. petrol, 48–50 PS (47–49 hp)	Horch "830" 3.5L 8-cyl. petrol 80 PS (79 hp)		HWa* "526 D" 6.2L, 6-cyl. inline diesel, 80 PS (79 hp) developed by MAN, Henschel, and Humboldt-Deutz * HeeresWaffenamt
Alternative engine:	Stoewer "R 180W" 4-cyl. petrol 42–43 PS (41–42 hp)	Horch V-8 3.8L 8-cyl. petrol 90 PS (89 hp)		No alternate power-plants
Alternative engine:	BMW-"325" 6-cyl. petrol 45 PS (44 hp)	Opel R-6 3.6L 6-cyl. petrol 68 PS (67 hp)	Ford V-8 3.6L 8-cyl. petrol 78 PS (77 hp)	–
Alternative engine:	Hanomag "20 B" 6-cyl. petrol 48–50 PS (47–49 hp)	-	-	–
Top speed:	-	-	-	70 km/h (43 mph)
Range:	400 km (250 mi)	400 km (250 mi)	-	290 km (180 mi) cross-country / 360 km (220 mi) on-road

== See also ==
- High-Mobility Multipurpose Wheeled Vehicle
- Military light utility vehicle
- GAZ-61 – early Russian 4x4 staff sedan (1938–1945)
- GAZ-64 / GAZ-67 – Russian WWII jeep equivalents
- Kurogane Type 95 – Japanese light scout car (1936–1944)
- U.S. World War II 1/4-ton jeeps (Ford & Willys; 1941–1945)
- Dodge VC- and VF-series 1/2-ton and 1½-ton vehicles (1940)
- Dodge WC series 1/2-ton, 3/4-ton and 1½-ton vehicles (1941–1945)
- Volkswagen Kübelwagen – succeeded light / medium Einheits-Pkw (1940–1945)
- U.S. standard WW II, 2½-ton, 6×6 truck
