= Opelwerk Brandenburg =

Coordinates: 52°25′20″N 12°31′40″E

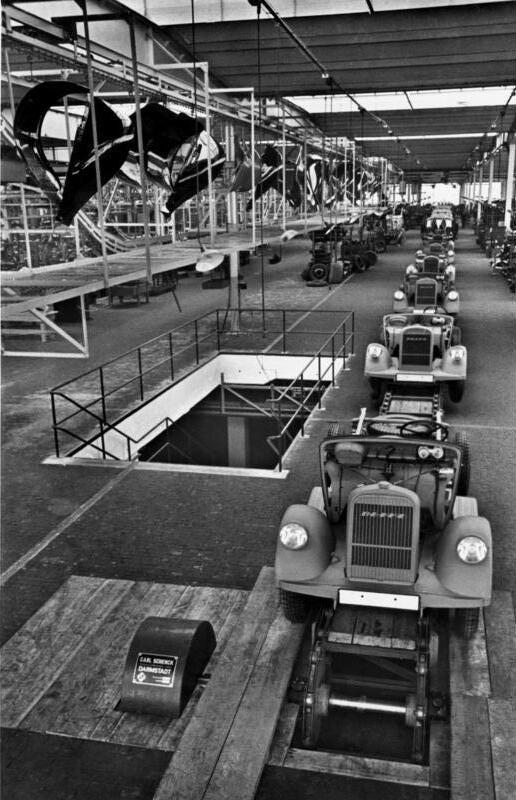
Assembly facilities at the Brandenburg Opel plant (1936)

The Opelwerk Brandenburg was a truck vehicle assembly plant, located in Brandenburg an der Havel, Germany. Built within seven months, it was opened by Adam Opel AG in November 1935 on the re-armament initiative of the Nazi government in order to ensure supplies of Opel Blitz trucks for the Wehrmacht armed forces. By 1944 more than 130,000 medium-weight trucks had been produced at the Brandenburg plant. Devastated by an Allied air raid on 6 August 1944, the facilities were dismantled and shipped east as reparations to the Soviet Union after the war.

== History ==
A press release early in 1935 stated that Adam Opel AG, backed by the Reich government, had decided to build a new plant at Brandenburg an der Havel because the existing Rüsselsheim headquarters was operating at full capacity. Opel, a subsidiary of General Motors (GM) since 1929, were an obvious candidate for the project, having pioneered mass production techniques in German passenger car production: by the late 1920s the company held more than 25% of the domestic passenger car market. Rapid progress was envisaged, with the factory scheduled to be ready for use in October 1935, in order to free up capacity at Rüsselsheim ahead of the launch of the 1936 passenger car range.

The available site in Brandenburg covered 850,000 square metres (9,100,000 sq ft) on the southern bank of the Silo Canal and is today the location of the town's Silo Canal East industrial zone. At the time of the Opel project, the vast area was not fully needed and much of it continued to be devoted to agricultural production. It appears that the project involved displacing local residents, but the 1935 press release reassured readers that the unused portion of the plant site would, until further notice, be made available free of charge to former residents displaced by the development.

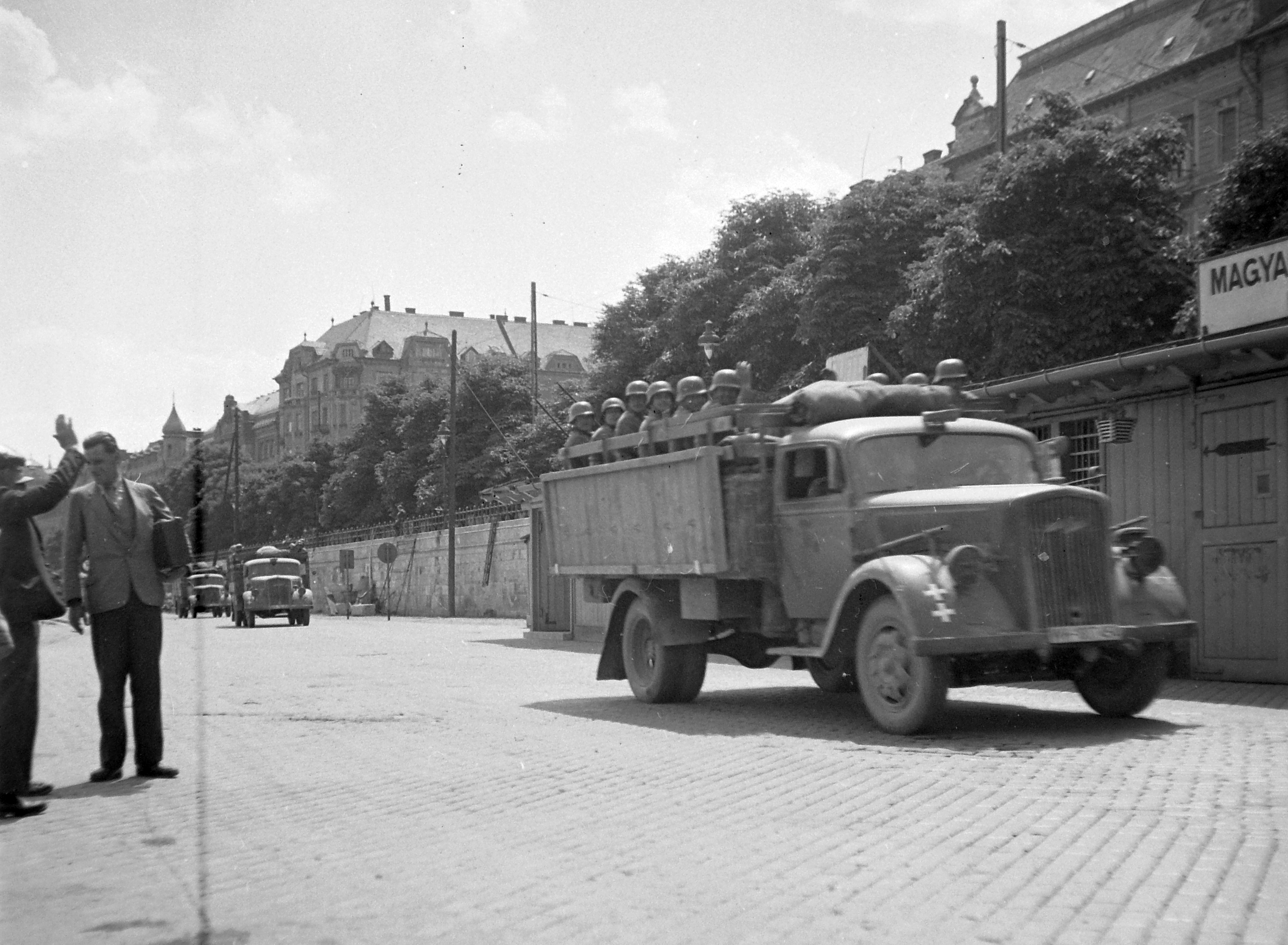
Wehrmacht Blitz truck in Budapest (1941)

The groundbreaking took place on 7 April 1935, and on 10 August 1935 it was possible to celebrate the completion of the building's shell. On 18 November 1935, just 190 days after the cornerstone had been laid, the first truck came off the production line. Production took place in one of several 24,200-square-metre (260,000 sq ft) two-storey production halls 178 metres (584 ft) long. Coach work and painting took place on the ground floor, while chassis, engines, and axles were assembled on the upper floor. There were a total of 1,200 production machines, each with its own motor, which allowed for a greater flexibility than the belt-driven machines characteristic of more traditional factory layouts. Twenty-seven production lines had a total length in excess of 5,000 meters (over 3 miles). The plant had its own power station which produced 4,000 kW of power, consuming 7 tonnes of coal per hour in the process.

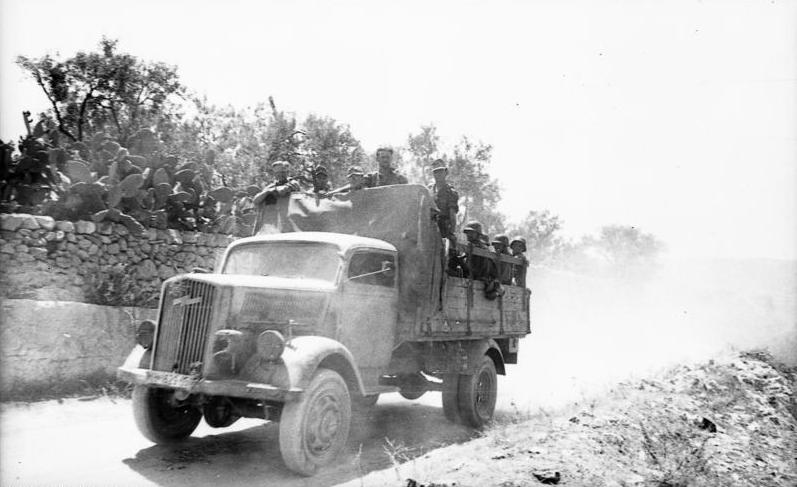
Wehrmacht Blitz 3.6 A in Italy (1944)

The total cost of the plant was 14 million Reichsmarks (equivalent to 65 million 2021 euros). The scheduled capacity provided for the production of 150 Opel Blitz trucks each day. The originally published annual capacity of 25,000 trucks was already exceeded in 1939 when 27,936 trucks were produced. After World War II began with the Invasion of Poland, the German government ordered a halt to all civilian vehicle manufacturing and the robust Opel Blitz 3.6 truck became a standard medium-duty military vehicle of the Wehrmacht. In July 1942 one of the company's rising talents was appointed to take over as production direction: Heinrich Nordhoff would later become more widely known as the leader who built up the Volkswagen business in Wolfsburg.

On 6 August 1944 a RAF air raid destroyed an estimated 20% of the plant. Despite this, it would have been possible to resume production at the end of the war. However, Brandenburg found itself in the Soviet occupation zone, and it quickly became apparent that the victorious powers had their own plan for Opel's production facilities, and the plants in Rüsselsheim and Brandenburg were dismantled and transported to the Soviet Union. Unlike the company's Kadett principal passenger car, which re-emerged as the Soviet built Moskvitch 400-420, the existing Opel Blitz truck range never returned as Soviet vehicles.

== Employees ==
In November 1935 the company had 680 employees, which had risen to 3,365 by 1940. The plant's peak employment level reached 4,286, in 1943.

== Production volumes ==
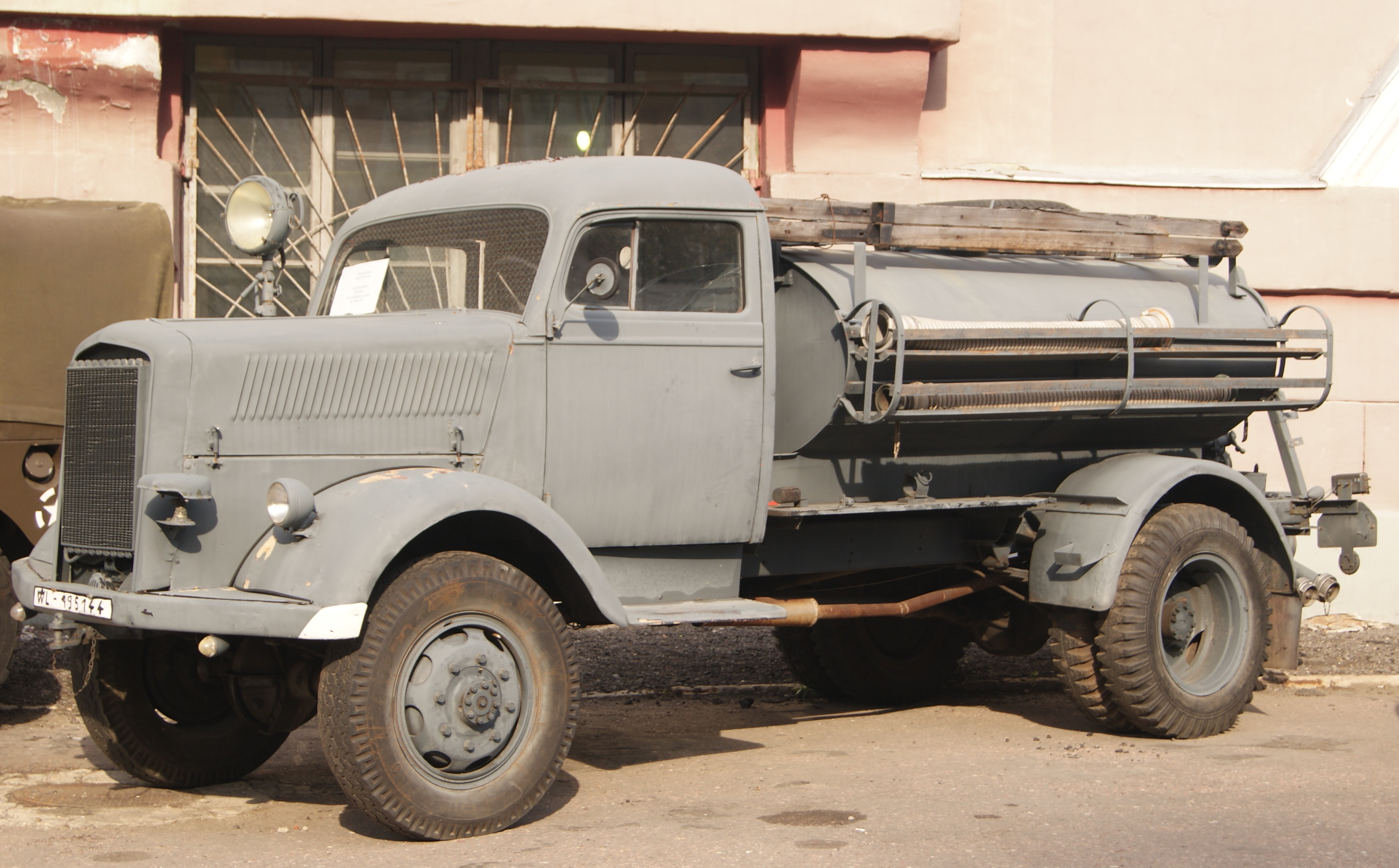
Opel Blitz 3.6-6700A Luftwaffe 4x4 fire engine

Between April 1937 and August 1944 the plant produced 82,356 Blitz 3.6-36 „S" (Standard for rear-wheel drive) 3-tonne trucks, plus a further 14,122 3.6-42 long-wheelbase versions and a further 8,336 low chassis models for special conversions: these were mostly destined to support bus bodies. They were initially fitted with GM Buick Marquette flathead six-cylinder 3.5 L engines, until Opel from 1937 installed the newly developed 3.6 L overhead valve engines they also mounted in Admiral luxury cars.

The four-wheel drive Blitz "A" (Allrad) was added to the range in July 1940, with 24,981 built until 1944. In military service, the trucks were appreciated as efficient and reliable vehicles. From 1942 onwards about 4,000 half-track (Maultier) and multiple rocket launcher (Panzerwerfer) versions were built mainly for the use on the Eastern Front; this model accounted for an overall production of approximately 130,000 units between 1940 and 1944. As of summer 1944, production output had reached 2,600 per month. After the August air raid, manufacturing was continued by Mercedes-Benz in Mannheim, replacing the company's L3000 model.

Between 1940 and 1943 the chassis of the Wehrmacht medium standard passenger car (Einheits-PKW), an all-wheel drive vehicle for military use, which had been originally developed in 1935-36 by Auto Union as Horch 901 in Zwickau, was also assembled under licence at the Opel Brandenburg plant. Equipped with Blitz straight-six engines, Ambi Budd produced the coachwork and completed the vehicles at its plant in Berlin-Johannisthal. With an unladen weight exceeding 2.7 tons, the stiff cars largely proved impracticable on the fronts.

== See also ==
- Economy of Nazi Germany

== Sources ==
- Hans-Jürgen Schneider: 125 Jahre Opel, Autos und Technik, Verlag Schneider+Repschläger 1987 (no known ISBN)
