= Einheitsdiesel =

World War II light off-road truck

Leichter geländegängiger Lastkraftwagen
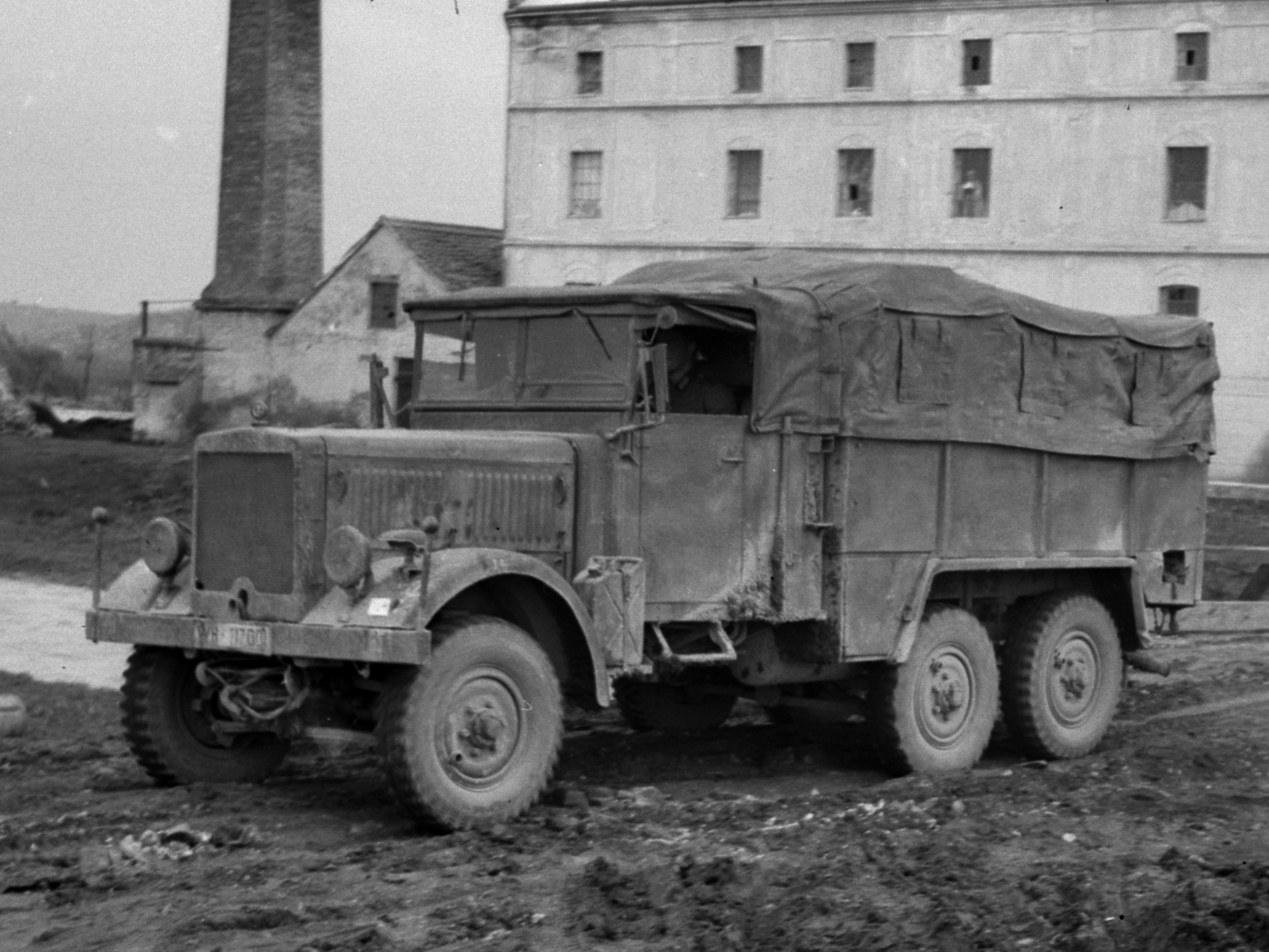
- Einheitsdiesel 1941 in Jugoslawien
- Type: 2 1/2-ton 6×6 military cargo truck
- Place of origin: Germany

Production history
- Designed: 1936-37
- Manufacturer: several
- Produced: 1937–1940
- No. built: Grand Total: ~12,300
- Variants: several

Specifications
- Mass: 4.925 t (10,860 lb) empty 7.300 t (16,090 lb) loaded
- Engine: HWA 526 D 80 PS (59 kW) at 2,400 rpm
- Transmission: 5 spd.

The Einheitsdiesel (officially leichter geländegängiger Einheits-Lkw 2,5 t, or light standard off-road truck, 2.5 tonnes) is a standardised truck developed for the German Wehrmacht ahead of World War II. It was built until 1940 and used throughout the war.

== Development ==
After the Wehrmacht took over a wide variety of non-standardized vehicles from the Reichswehr, whose fleet consisted of all sorts of modified civilian models, the Heereswaffenamt (HWA) decided to procure a standardized, highly mobile off-road truck with high performance. By 1936, rearmament planning had advanced to the point where a standardized truck development program became possible. The HWA initially aimed to develop standardized vehicles with two, three and four axles but in the end only built the three-axle version in the 2½ ton class.

The engine, called the type HWa 526 D (80 PS), resulted from a joint development contract awarded to MAN, Henschel and Humboldt-Deutz while the chassis design came mainly from Henschel. In contrast to the planned medium offroad truck, all three axles of the Einheitsdiesel had single wheels. Because of its all-wheel drive, the truck proved very popular and highly mobile. Drawbacks included complex technology for the time and a small payload.

One of the main goals the HWA achieved with the HWA 526 D engine was that all components were interchangeable even though manufactured by a number of different companies.

== Production ==
Large manufacturers were involved in the production of the Einheitsdiesel:

- Büssing-NAG (3500 units)
- Daimler-Benz (550 units)
- FAUN (700 units)
- Henschel (1500 units)
- Magirus (2500 units)
- MAN (1795 units)

Other companies to support the program included Borgward, Krupp and Vomag. Production ran over four years from 1937 to 1940, during which about 12,300 units were built. In 1940, more modern trucks achieving the same payload with only two axles became available and Einheitsdiesel production was halted in favor of these new models.

== Variants ==
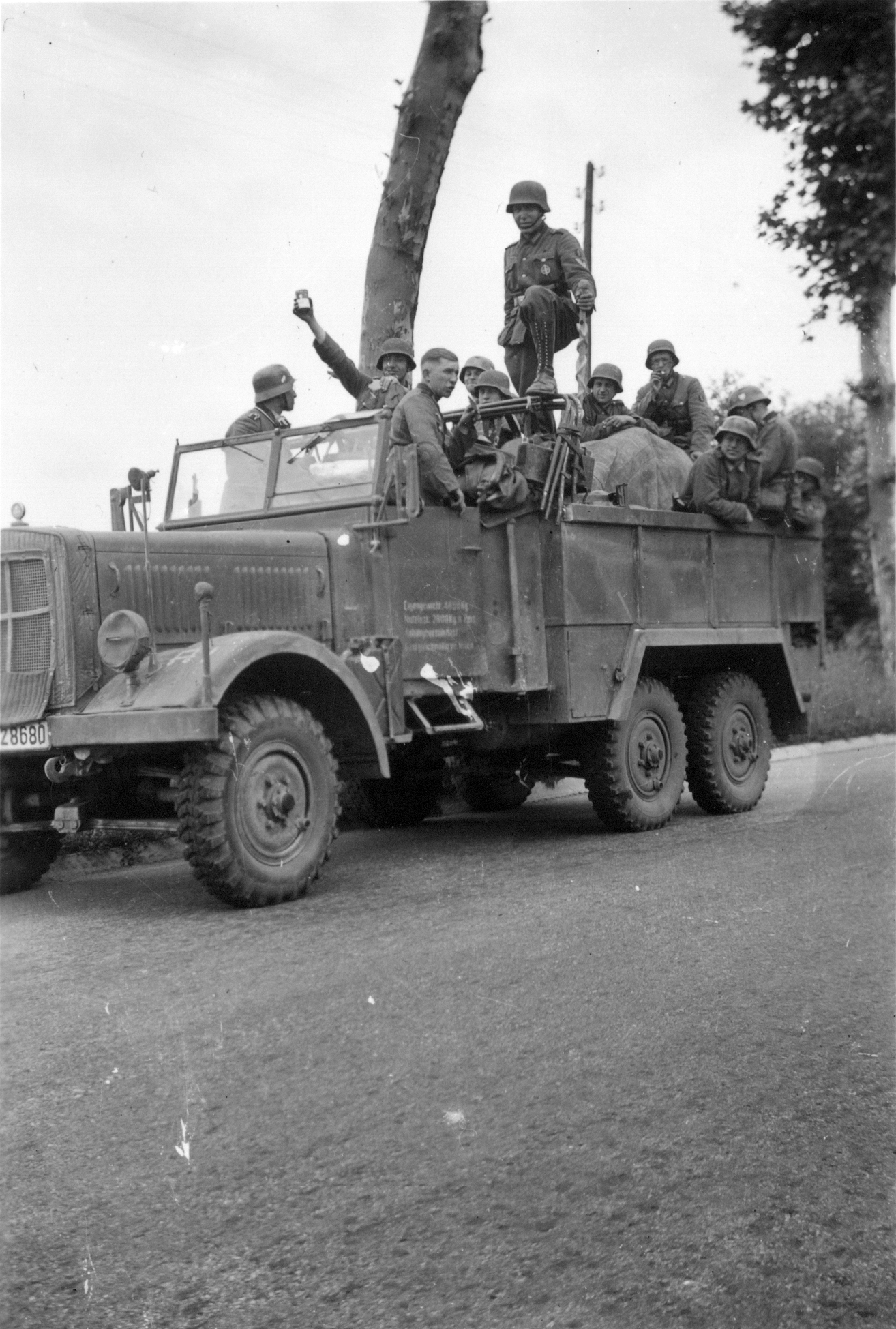
German radio troops at Calais (1940)

The Einheitsdiesel was used as a platform for a range of different bodies, with most receiving a simple truck bed made of sheet steel. Notable variants included a mobile field kitchen and a special measurement and equipment carrier version called Kfz. 63 with side access panels. There were also service trucks and a large number of communications vehicles such as radio and telephone trucks, antenna mast carriers and acoustic location / sound ranging trucks.

== Literature ==
- Reinhard Frank (1992), Lastkraftwagen der Wehrmacht (1. Auflage ed.), Erlangen: Karl Müller Verlag, p. 207, ISBN 3-86070-859-7
- G. N. Georgano (1995), World War Two Military Vehicles Transport & Halftracks (Reprint ed.), London: Osprey, p. 208, ISBN 1-85532-406-7
