= Opel Blitz =

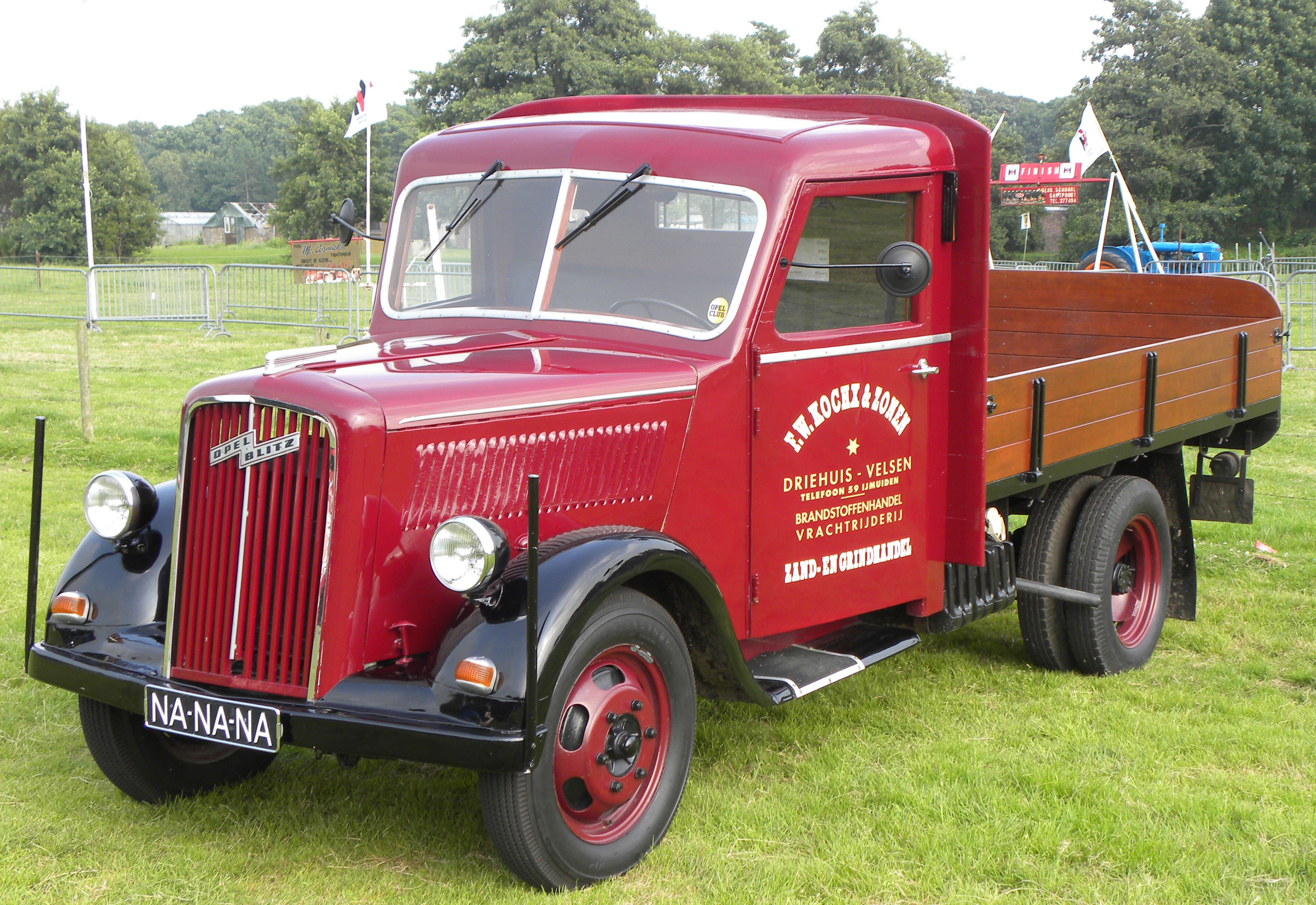
- Blitz 1.5 T

Overview
- Manufacturer: Opel (General Motors)
- Production: 1930–1975
- Assembly: Rüsselsheim; Opelwerk Brandenburg, Mercedes-Benz Mannheim Blitz 3.6 until 1944

Body and chassis
- Class: light/medium truck/ light commercial vehicle
- Body style: Van; Pickup truck Minibus

Chronology
- Successor: Opel Arena

Opel Blitz (Blitz being German for "lightning") was the name given to various light and middleweight trucks built by the German Opel automobile manufacturer between 1930 and 1975. The Blitz name was then applied to the British-made Bedford CF when it replaced the Blitz in certain markets.

The original logo for this truck, two stripes arranged loosely like a lightning symbol in the form of a horizontally stretched letter "Z", still appears in the current Opel logo.

== History ==
=== 1930 ===
During the years preceding World War II, Opel was Germany's largest truck producer. The Blitz name, coined in a prize competition, was first applied to the new Opel truck presented in November 1930. As part of the Nazi economy and the German re-armament efforts, the authorities ordered the construction of the Opelwerk Brandenburg facilities in 1935, and through 1944 more than 130,000 Blitz trucks and chassis were produced.

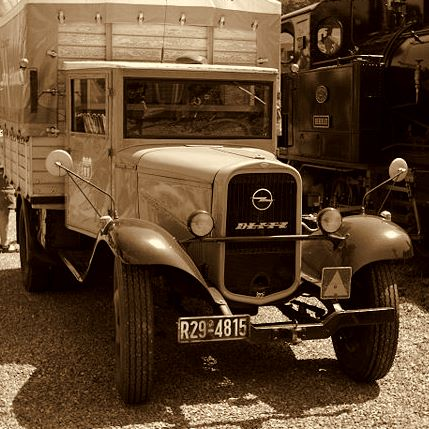
1934 Blitz truck (with contemporary logo)

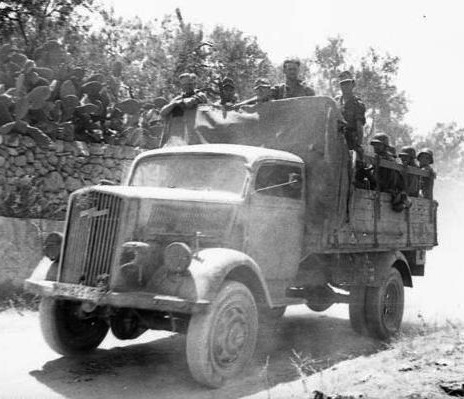
Blitz A medium-weight Wehrmacht truck, Italy, 1944

The new Blitz came with two different engines; the heavier models were equipped with the flathead 61 PS (45 kW) 3.5-liter petrol straight-six engine from the 1930 GM Marquette. Following General Motors' takeover of Opel in 1929, the production tools for the Marquette engine were exported to Germany as this Buick sub-brand was made defunct. Opel's own 2.6-liter four-cylinder engine with 40 PS (29 kW) was also available.

By 1934, four versions of the one-tonne basic model were offered, along with fourteen versions of the larger two-tonne and 2½-tonne trucks. The Marquette engine was replaced in 1937 with a modern overhead valve 75 hp (56 kW) straight-six engine also used in Opel Admiral passenger cars. This engine was very similar to Chevrolet engines from the same period, to the point that advancing Allies were able to put disabled Blitzes abandoned by retreating Germans easily back into service using Chevrolet/GMC and Bedford parts.

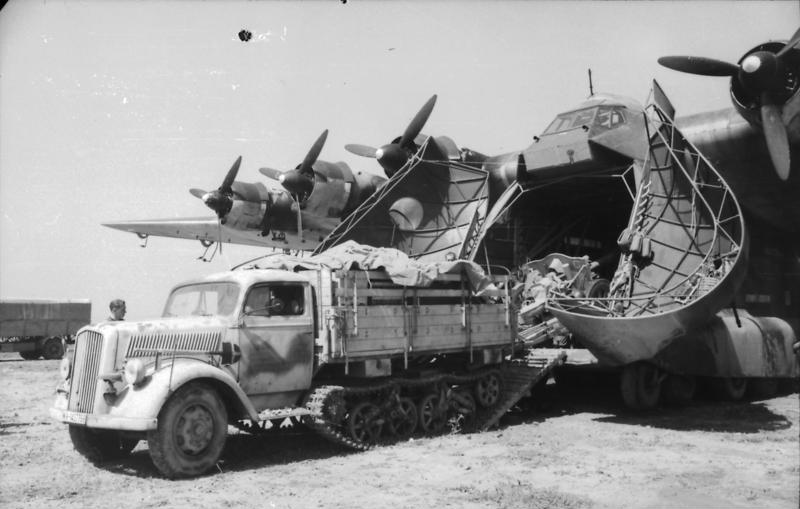
Maultier half track towing an artillery piece onto or off an Messerschmitt Me 323 Gigant transport

From 1939, the Blitz 3.6 three-tonne version was used in large numbers by the German armed forces (Wehrmacht) throughout World War II. Variants included an elongated version and the four-wheel drive Blitz A. To cope with the bad road conditions and the rasputitsa mud seasons on the Eastern Front, a half-tracked Maultier ("mule") Sd.Kfz. 3 version was built using tracks and suspension from Panzer I tanks, which was nearly identical in mechanics to that of the British Universal Carrier. Among other roles, these were used as service vehicles for the Messerschmitt Me 323 military transport aircraft.

The light basic model was manufactured as Blitz 2.5 in Rüsselsheim until 1942 and again from 1946, equipped with the 55 hp (41 kW) Opel Super 6 engine. On 6 August 1944, the Opelwerk Brandenburg was devastated by an RAF air raid. Until the end of the war, about 2,500 Blitz 3.6 trucks were built by order of Minister of Armaments Albert Speer at the Mannheim plant of the rival Daimler-Benz company, while production of its own Mercedes-Benz L3000 model had to be discontinued. After the war, the facilities in Brandenburg were completely dismantled at the behest of the Soviet Military Administration, while Daimler-Benz in Mannheim resumed building the Blitz 3.6 under the designation L 701 until 1949. The last 467 medium trucks were again assembled by Opel in Rüsselsheim until production finally discontinued in 1954 without a successor.

==== Nazi war crimes ====
It is claimed that Opel used forced labor to build the Blitz. The degree of control that General Motors in the US had over Opel at the time is subject to debate, but by production numbers alone, it is evident that Opel was heavily involved in production of trucks and other equipment for the Nazi war machine.

The Opel Blitz was one of the vehicles (along with Renault, Saurer and Magirus based vehicles) used by Germans in The Holocaust as a gas van to kill with carbon monoxide.

=== Post-war ===
After the end of the war, with the Brandenburg plant dismantled and transported to the Soviet Union, and 47% of the buildings in Rüsselsheim destroyed, former Opel employees began to rebuild the Rüsselsheim plant. The first postwar Blitz was completed on 15 July 1946 in the presence of United States Army General Geoffrey Keyes and other local leaders and press reporters.

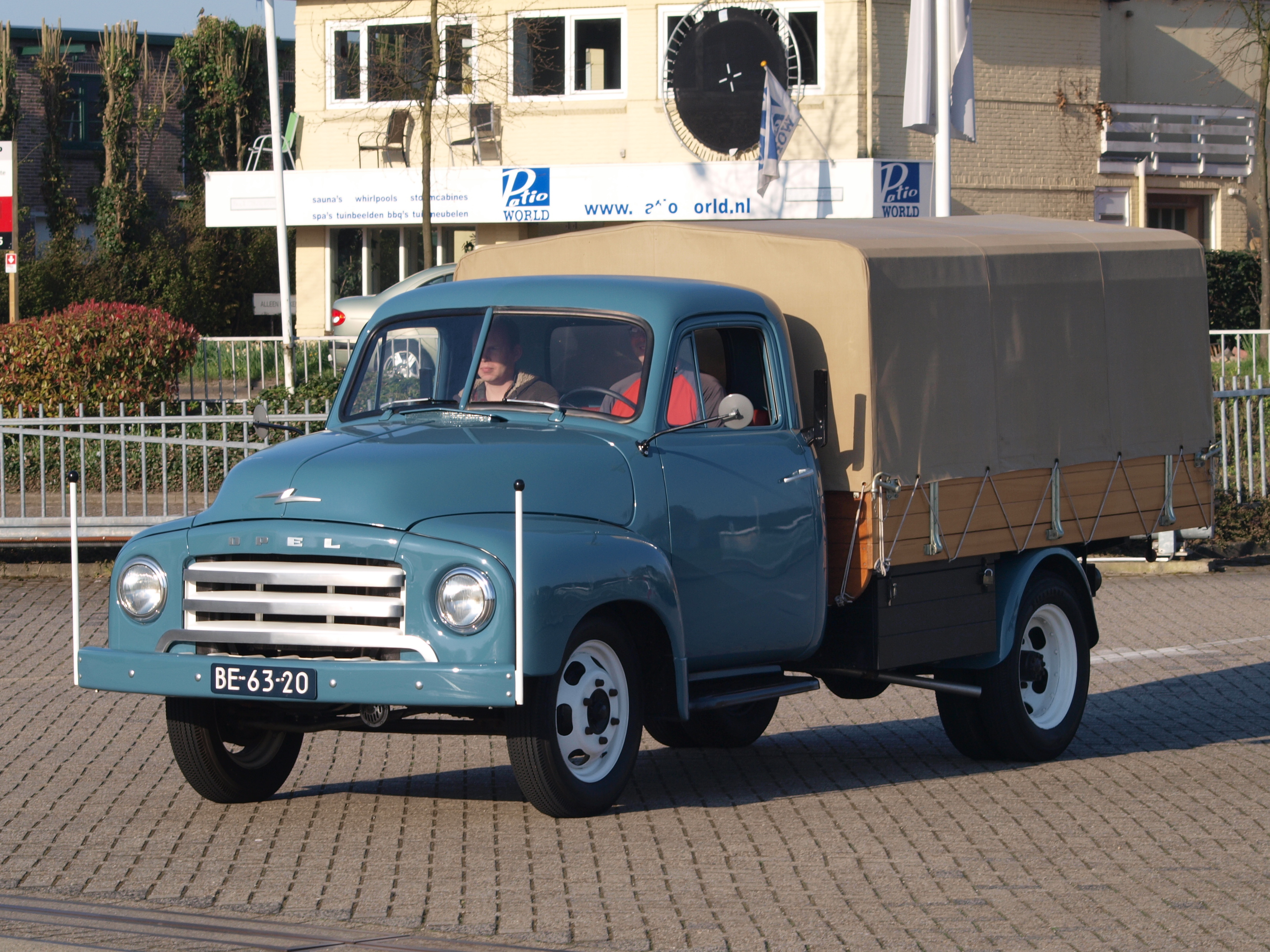
A 1953 Opel Blitz chassis cab truck

The first post-war designed Blitz in 1952 had the same cabin as the Chevrolet Advance Design, albeit with a different front end and coupled with the pre-war chassis, alongside a more economical Opel engine. The new 1.75 ton truck was offered with a van and pickup body. The new model retained the pre-war chassis with the straight-six petrol engine. Opel remained the market leader for light trucks despite strong competition especially by the newly designed 1955 Mercedes-Benz L 319 model and the Ford FK series, as well as Hanomag and Borgward vans. A coach version was built by the Karl Kässbohrer Fahrzeugwerke from 1953 to 1956. The 1.75 to model was a very popular fire engine (LF8-TS), typically equipped with an engine driven pump mounted at the front bumper and a second, portable pump in the back of the truck. The portable pump was powered by a 34 hp Volkswagen engine and weighed about 400 lbs. Firetruck conversions were made by companies such as Ziegler, Metz and Rosenbauer.

In 1960, the 1.9-tonner with 2.6-liter engine replaced the previous 1.75-tonne model. This model (later dubbed Opel Blitz A) was distinguished by a cab forward design and a revised six-cylinder engine, leading to less overall length and more cargo space. Due to the powerful engine, the truck was an excellent performer for its time, and the 1.9-tonne model with 2.6 L engine was like his predecessor a common base for a light fire truck. The configuration was similar to the one described above for the 1.75-tonner. However, commercial sales of this model declined during the production run, mainly due to the lack of an economic diesel option.

The Opel Blitz B was launched in 1965, and was the last of the Opel Blitz trucks. To improve fuel economy, this model was available with a 1.9-liter four-cylinder cam-in-head option. Alternatively, a 2.5 liter six-cylinder version of the new CIH engine series could be ordered. These engines were also available in the contemporary Rekord and Commodore models, but the Blitz engines had a stronger ground construction and were de-tuned for more torque and better economy.

Under pressure from strong competition of the popular Mercedes-Benz T2 model, in 1968, Opel finally offered a 2,100 cc Indenor XDP 4.90 diesel engine (most famously used in the Peugeot 504) - but too late to regain lost market shares. Opel GM decided not to develop a successor, and in 1975, the production of Opel commercial vehicles finally ceased.

=== Bedford Blitz ===
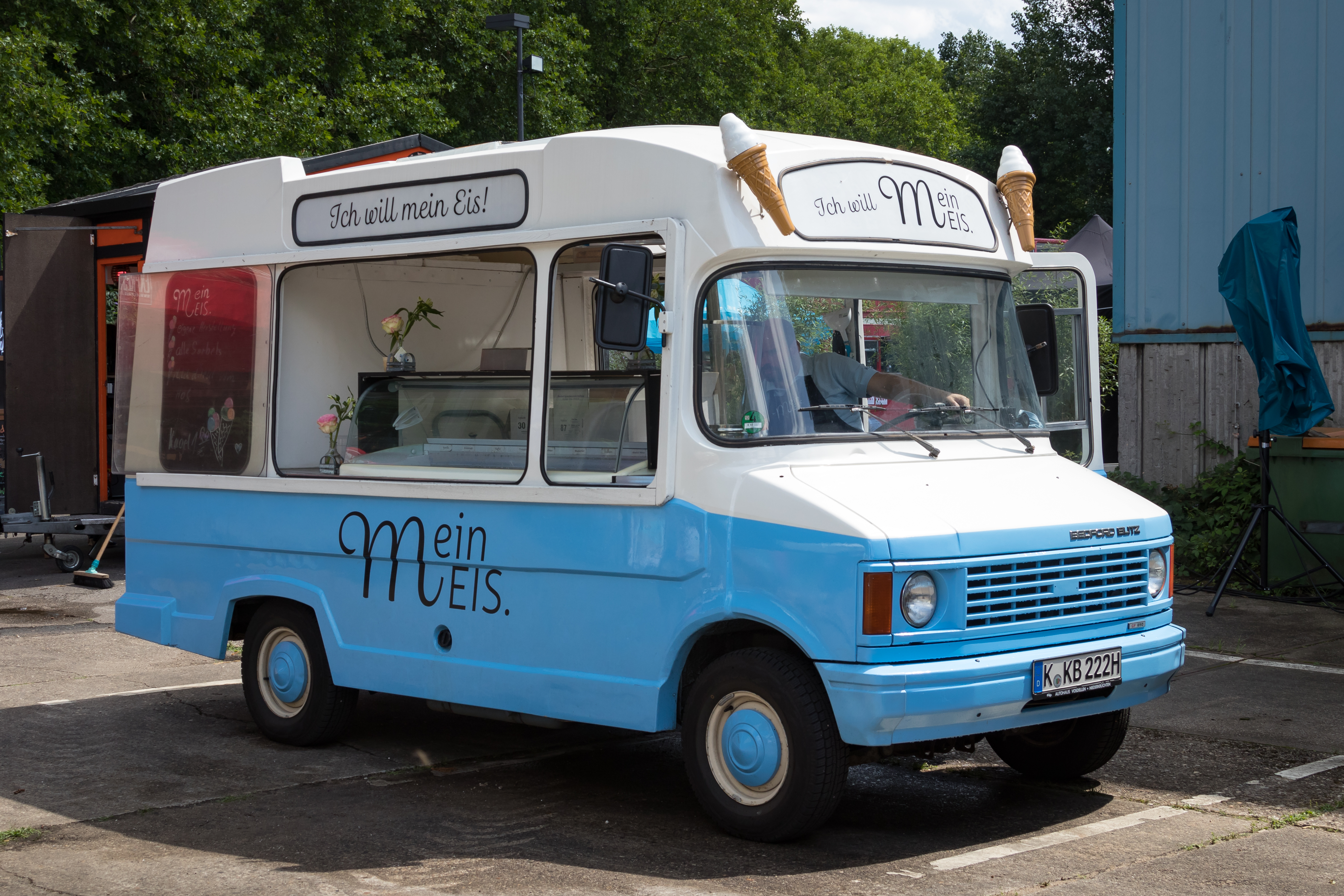
A Bedford Blitz ice cream truck

According to the corporate policy of General Motors, from 1973 to 1987 a successor vehicle produced by Bedford Vehicles of Luton, and based on the Bedford CF, was sold in the German market as the Bedford Blitz, to fill the replacement need for the Opel Blitz. Imports to Germany ended in 1987, and Opel left the commercial sector, instead focusing on car-derived vans such as the Opel Astravan and Opel Corsavan. It was not until 1998 that Opel re-entered the sector with the Opel Arena.

== Gallery ==
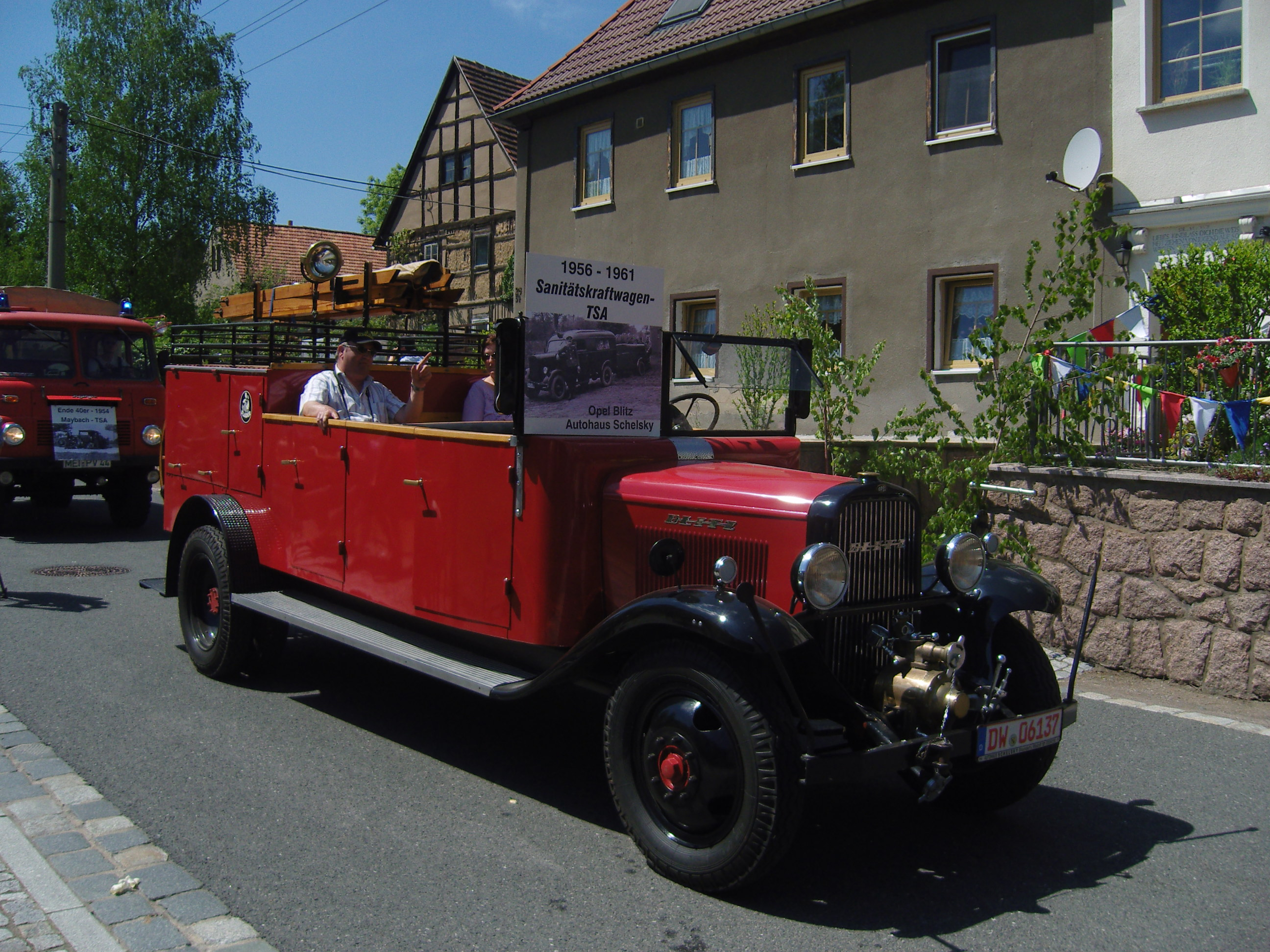
First generation Opel Blitz used as a fire truck

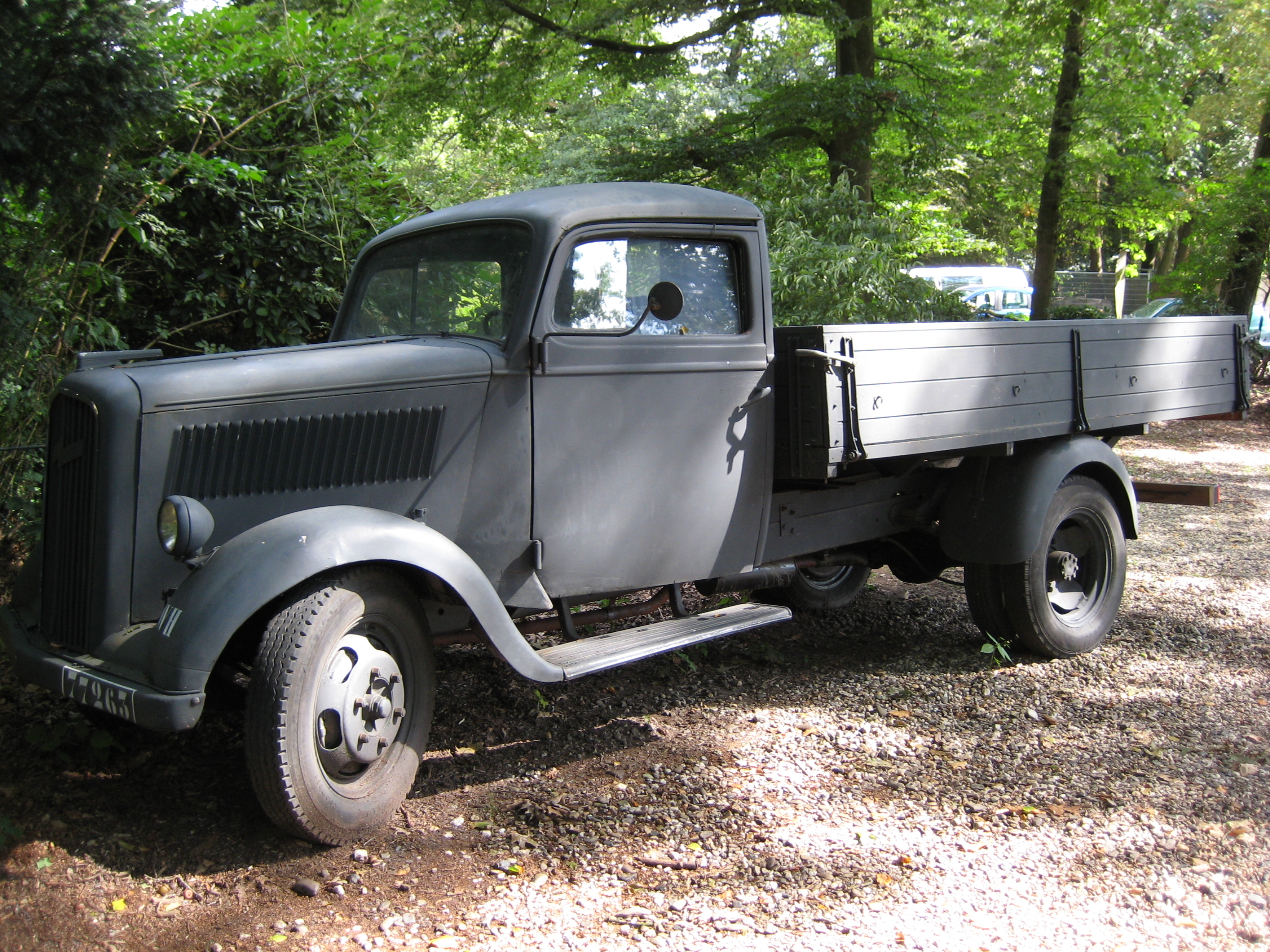
World War 2 era Blitz 2.5

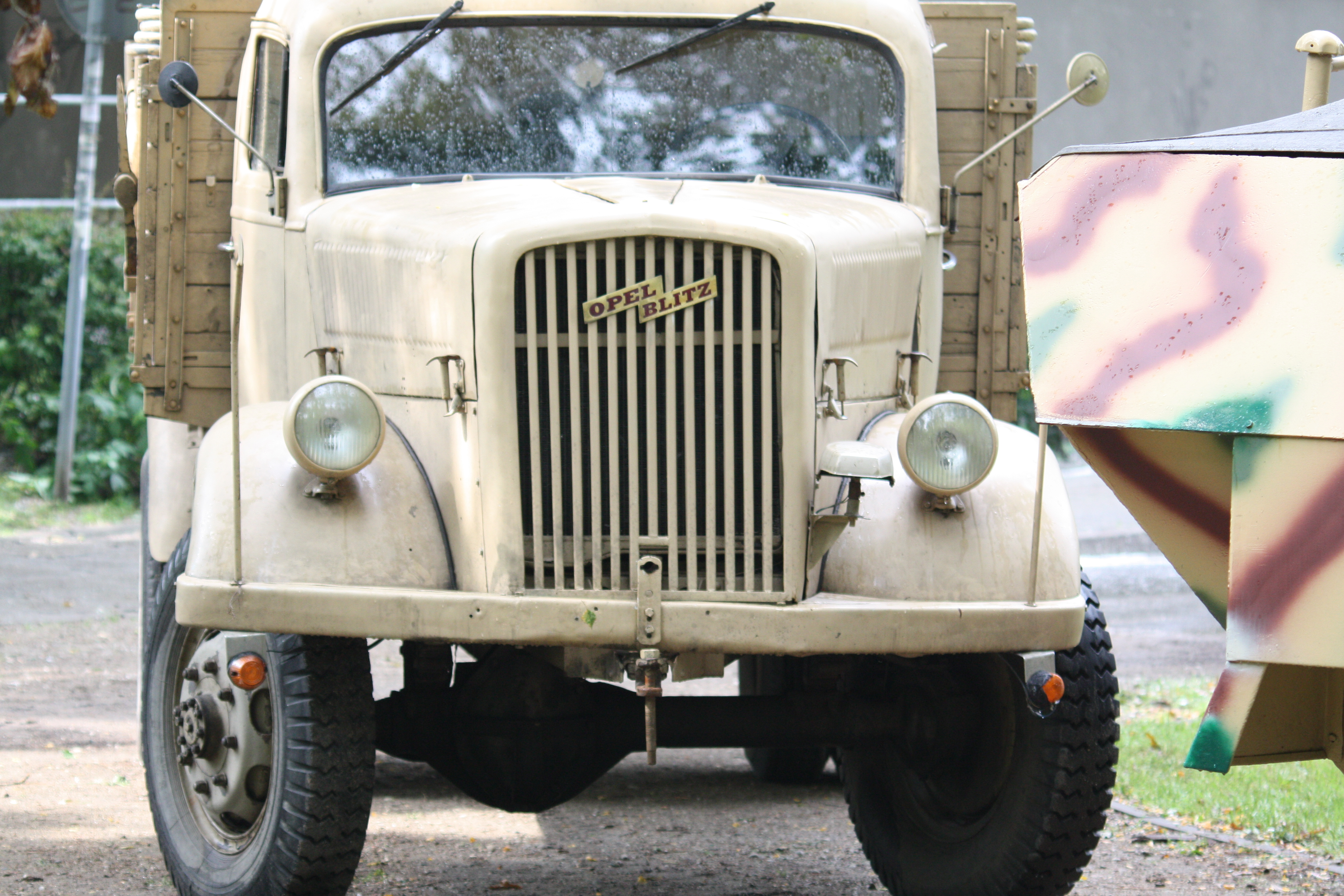
Four-Wheel Drive Blitz A 3.6 with blackout light

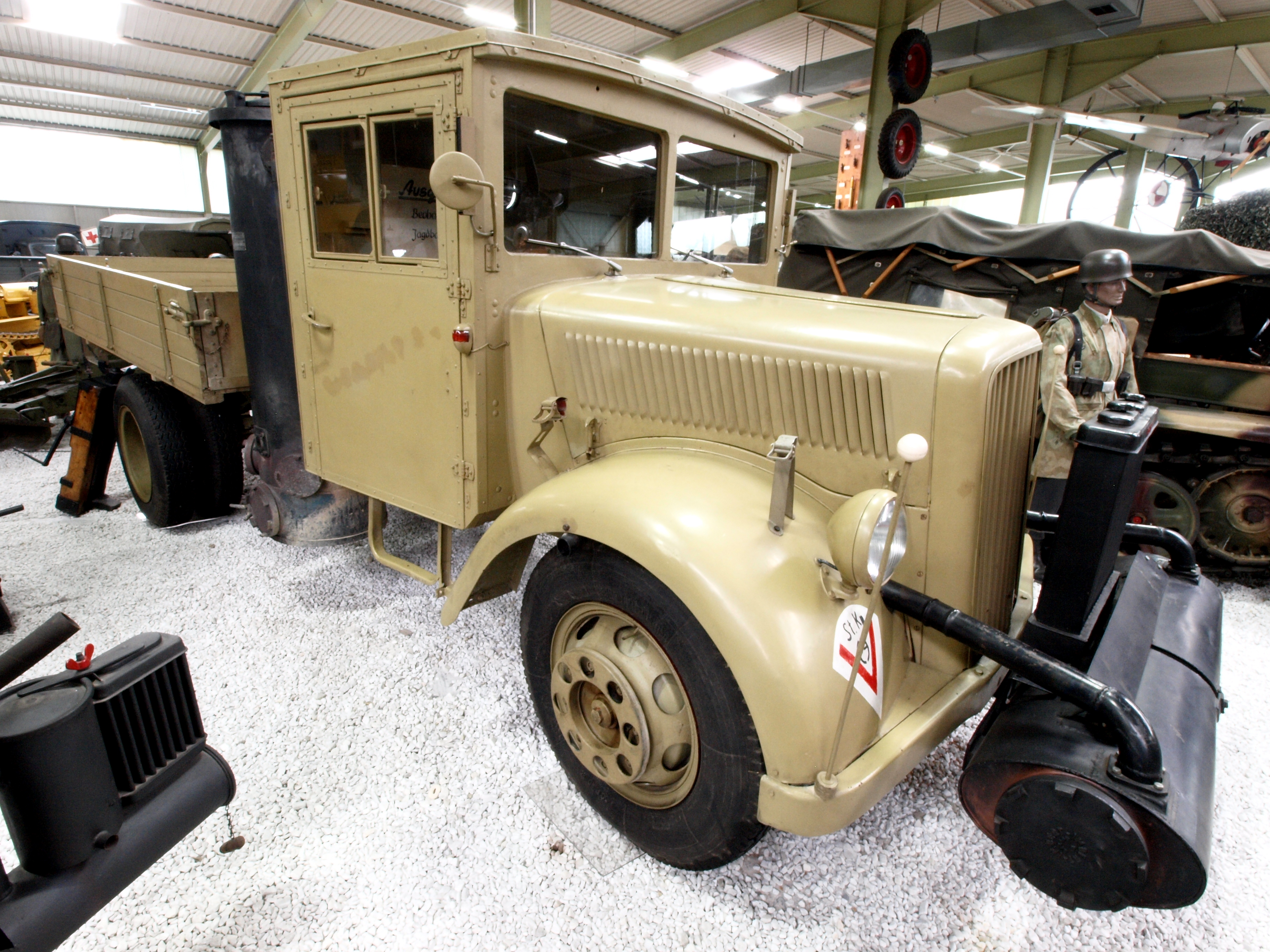
Daimler-Benz L 701 copy running on wood gas

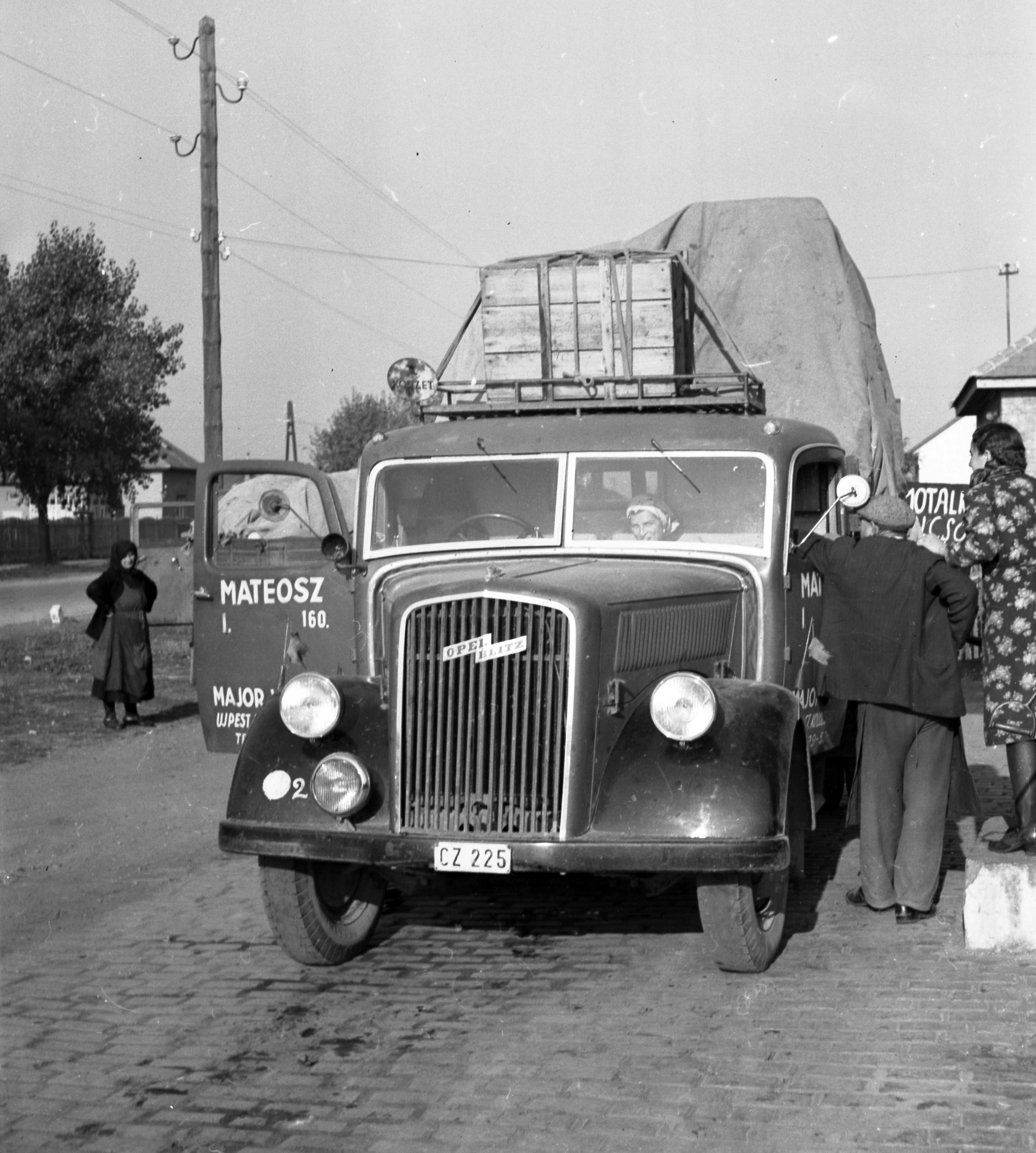
1941 Blitz

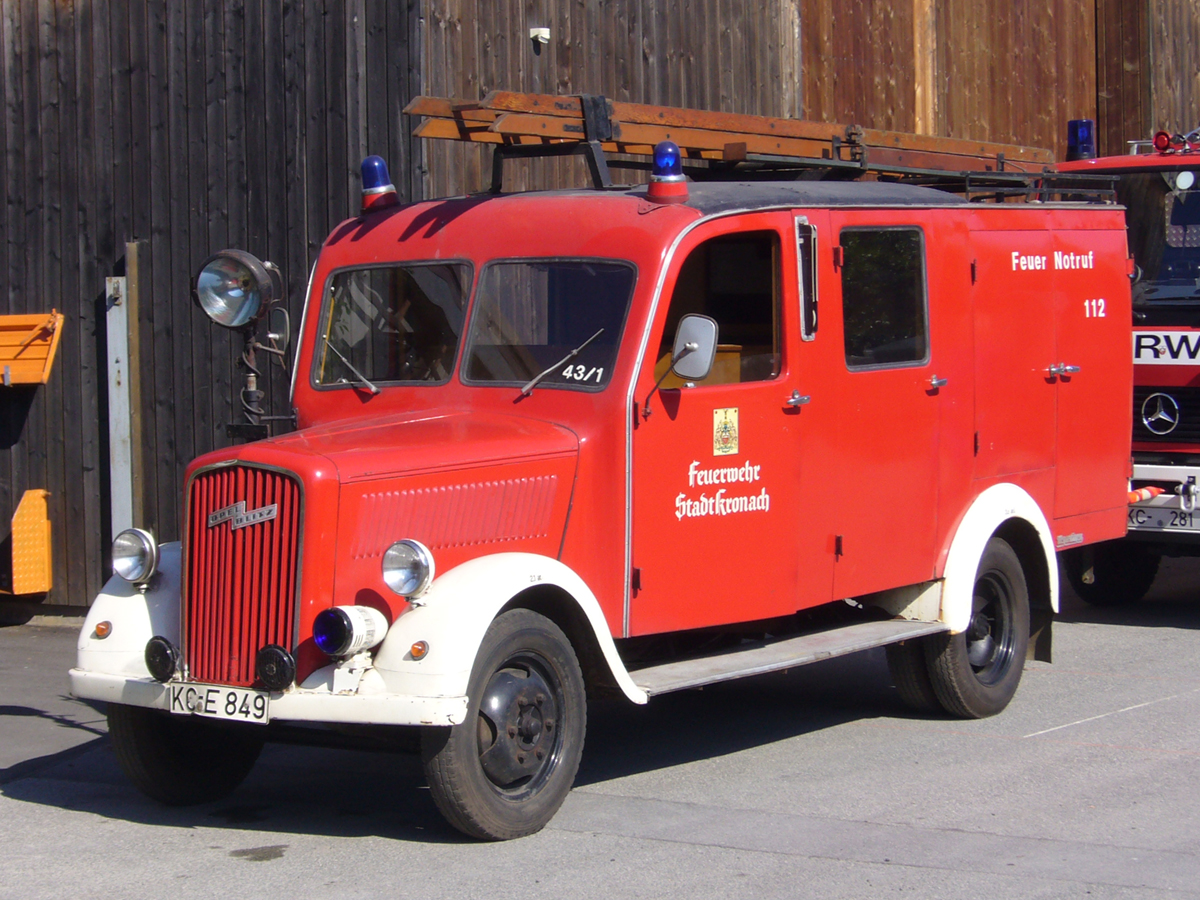
1951 Blitz

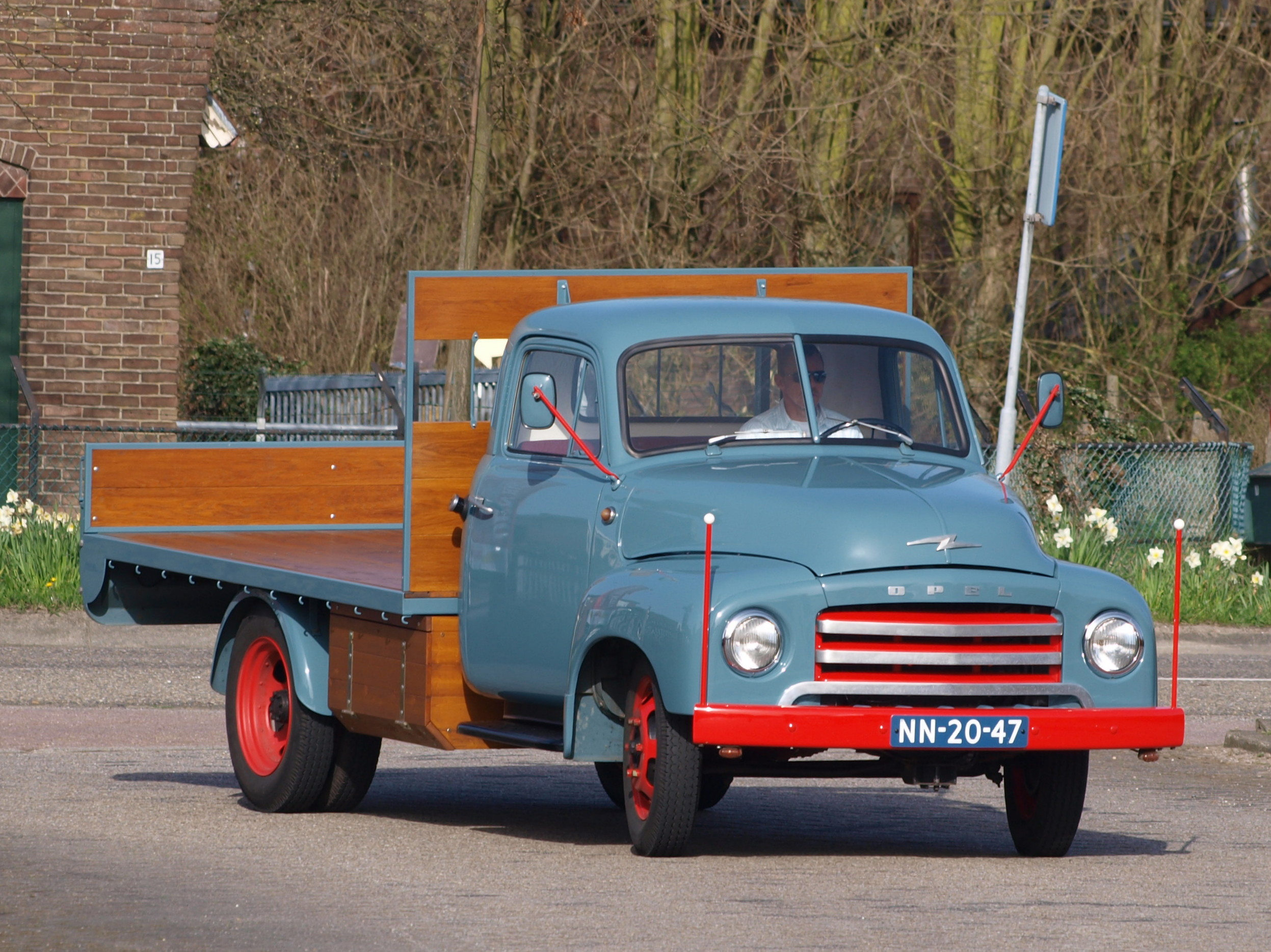
1950s Pickup Truck

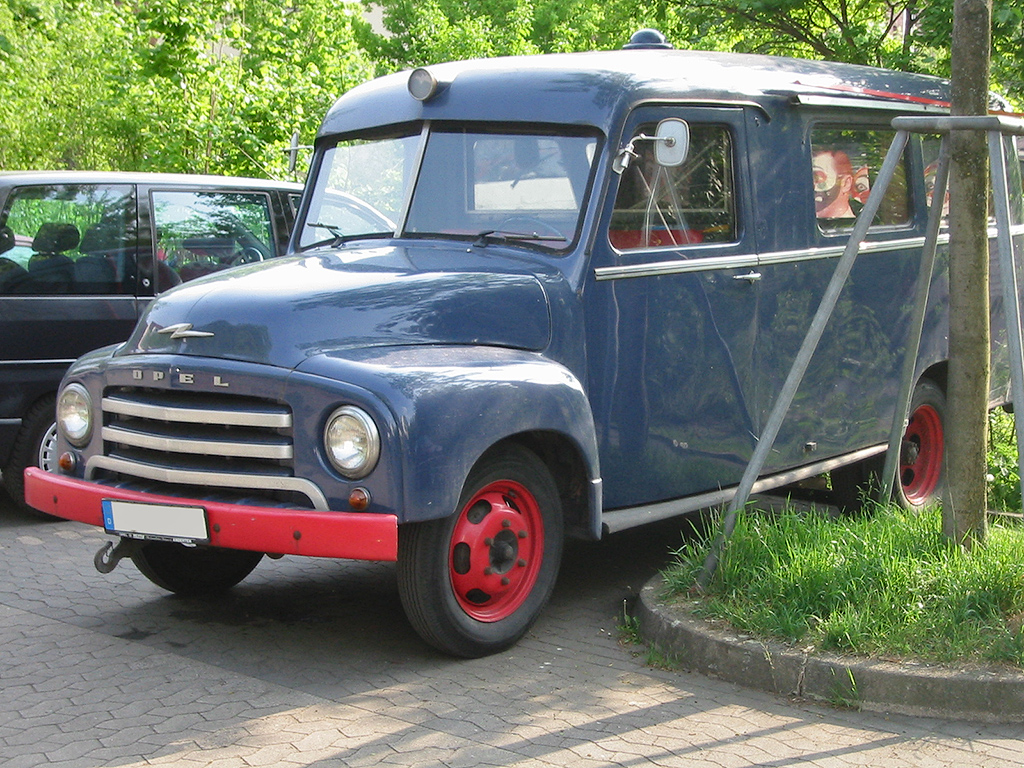
1950s panel van

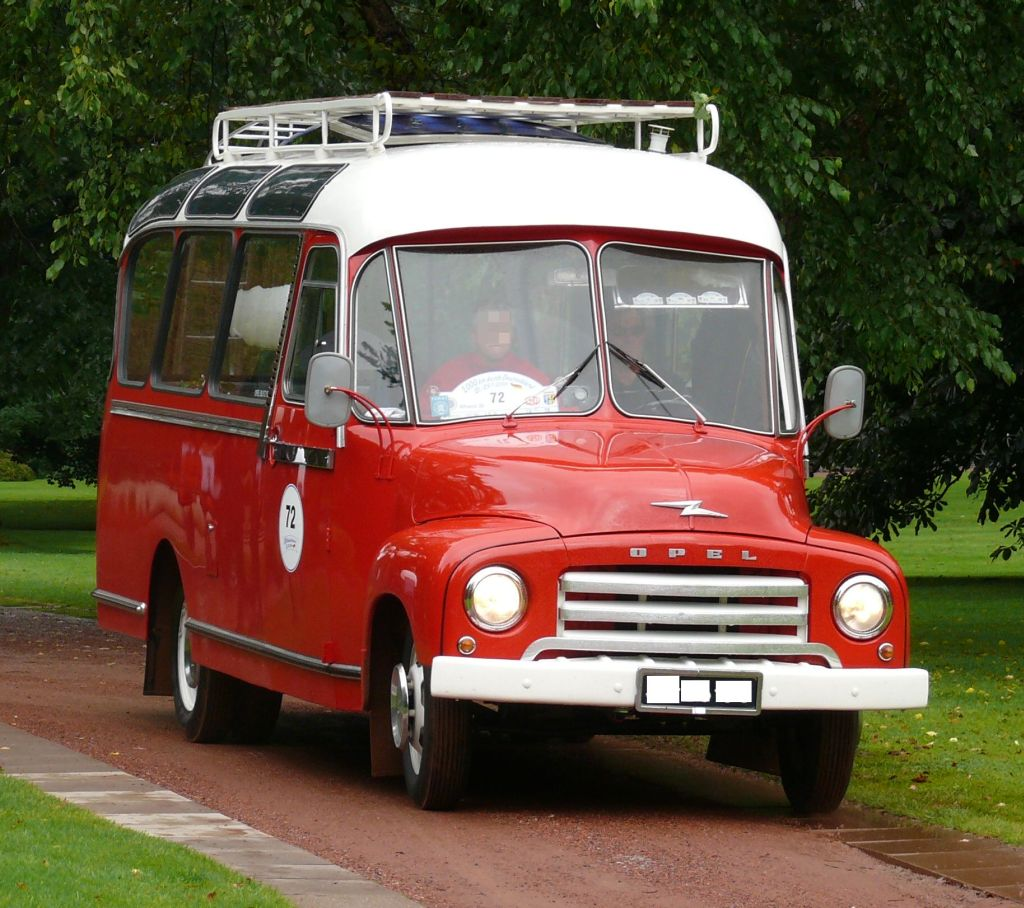
1950s Coach Body

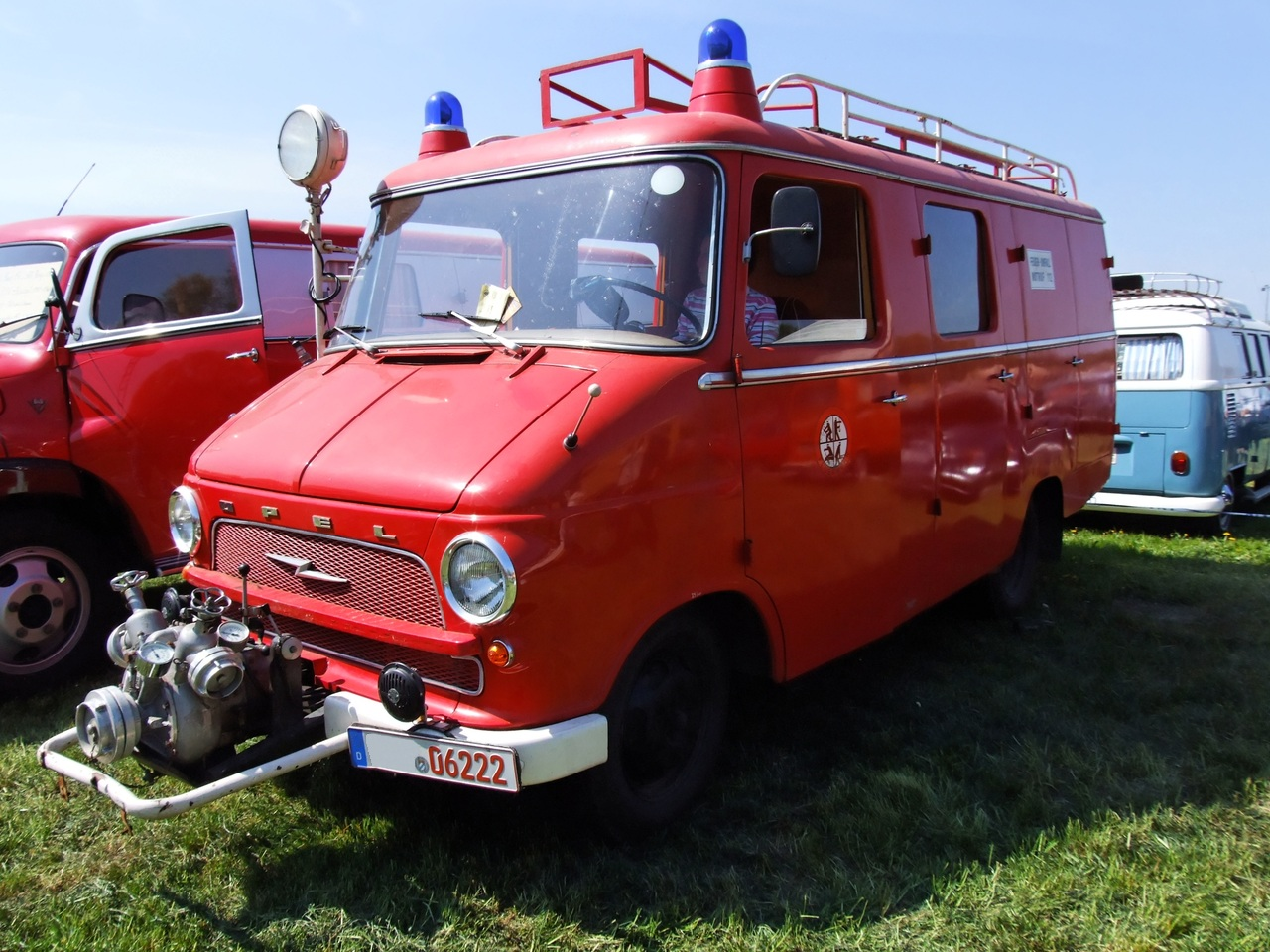
1960 Fire Brigade Truck

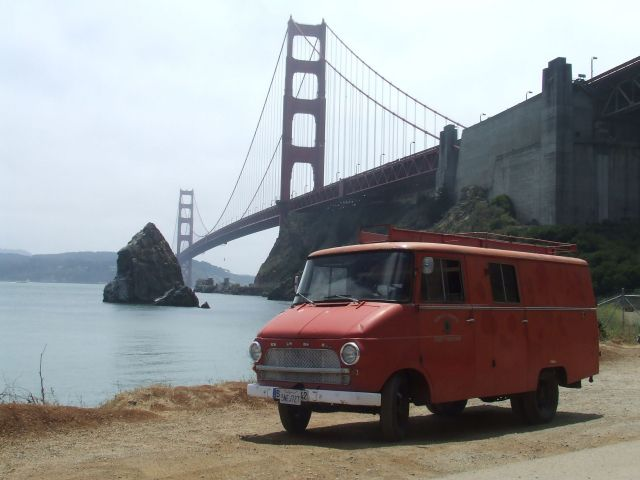
1962 Opel Blitz 1.9 to with 2.6 L engine

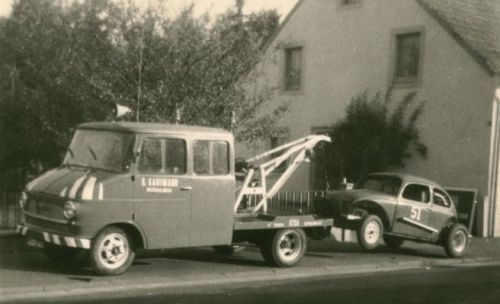
Opel Blitz A Tow Truck (Build: Kaufmann Zweibrücken, Germany)

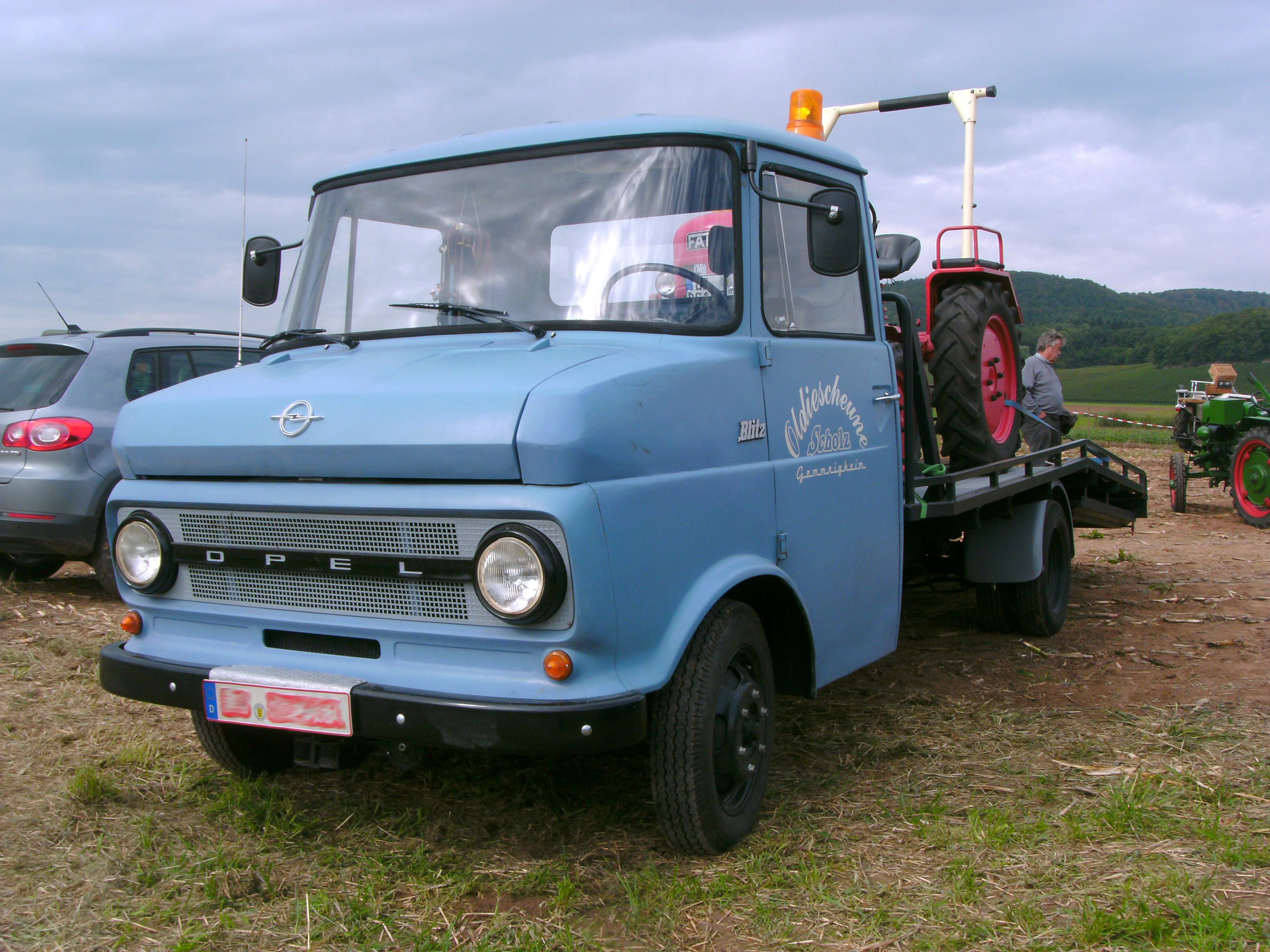
1965 Pickup Truck

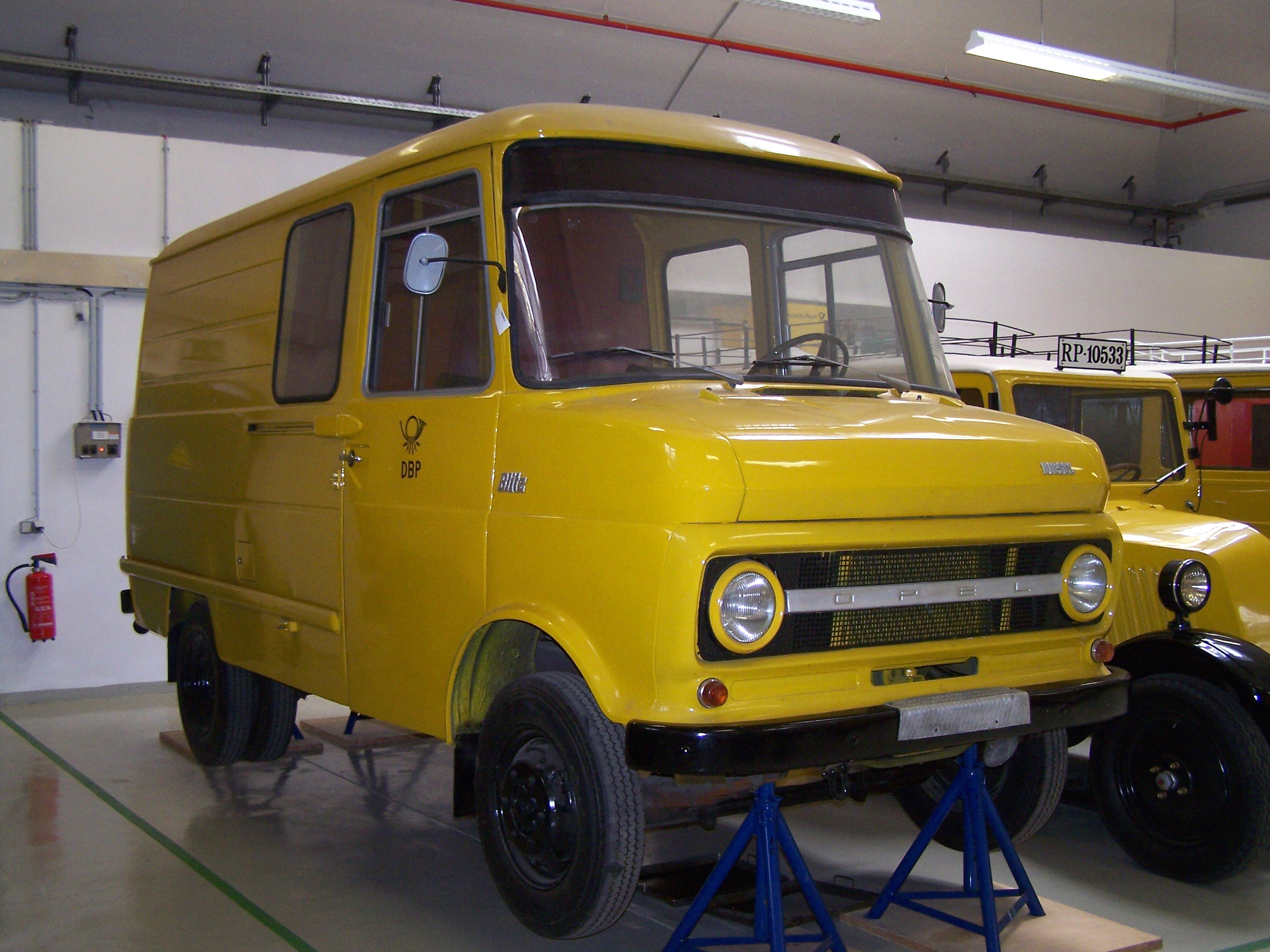
1965 Deutsche Bundespost Van

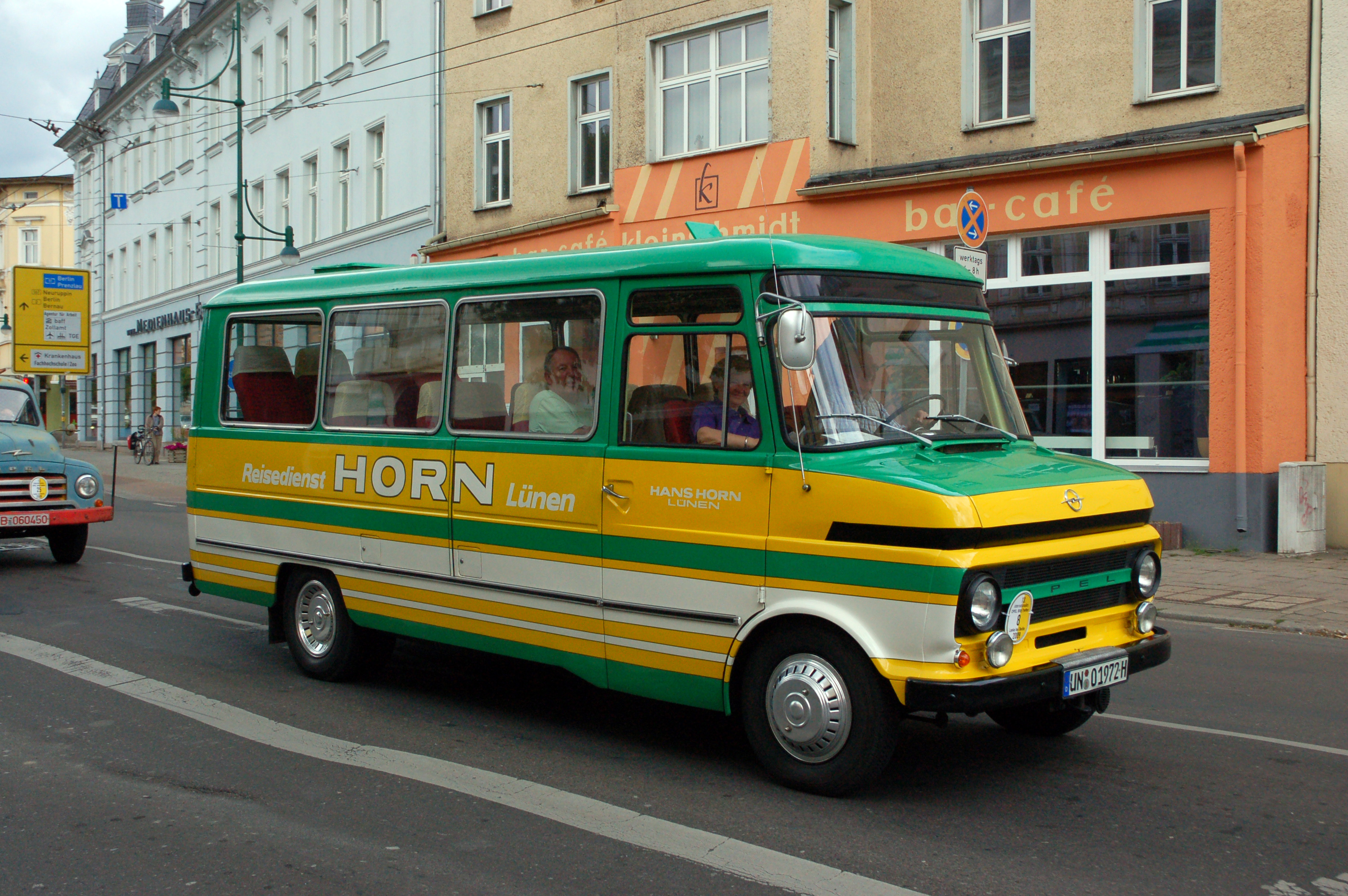
1965 Coach

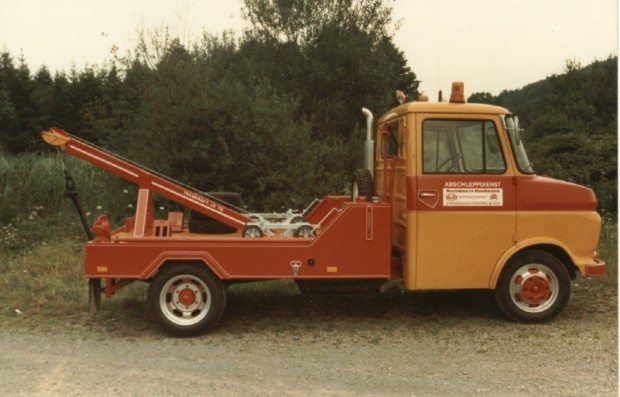
Opel Blitz Tow Truck Early 80s (Build: Kaufmann Zweibrücken, Germany)

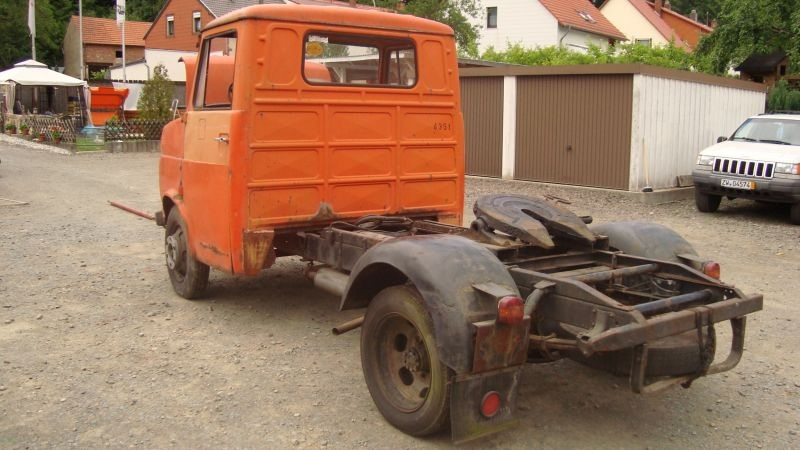
Opel Blitz Rig Truck

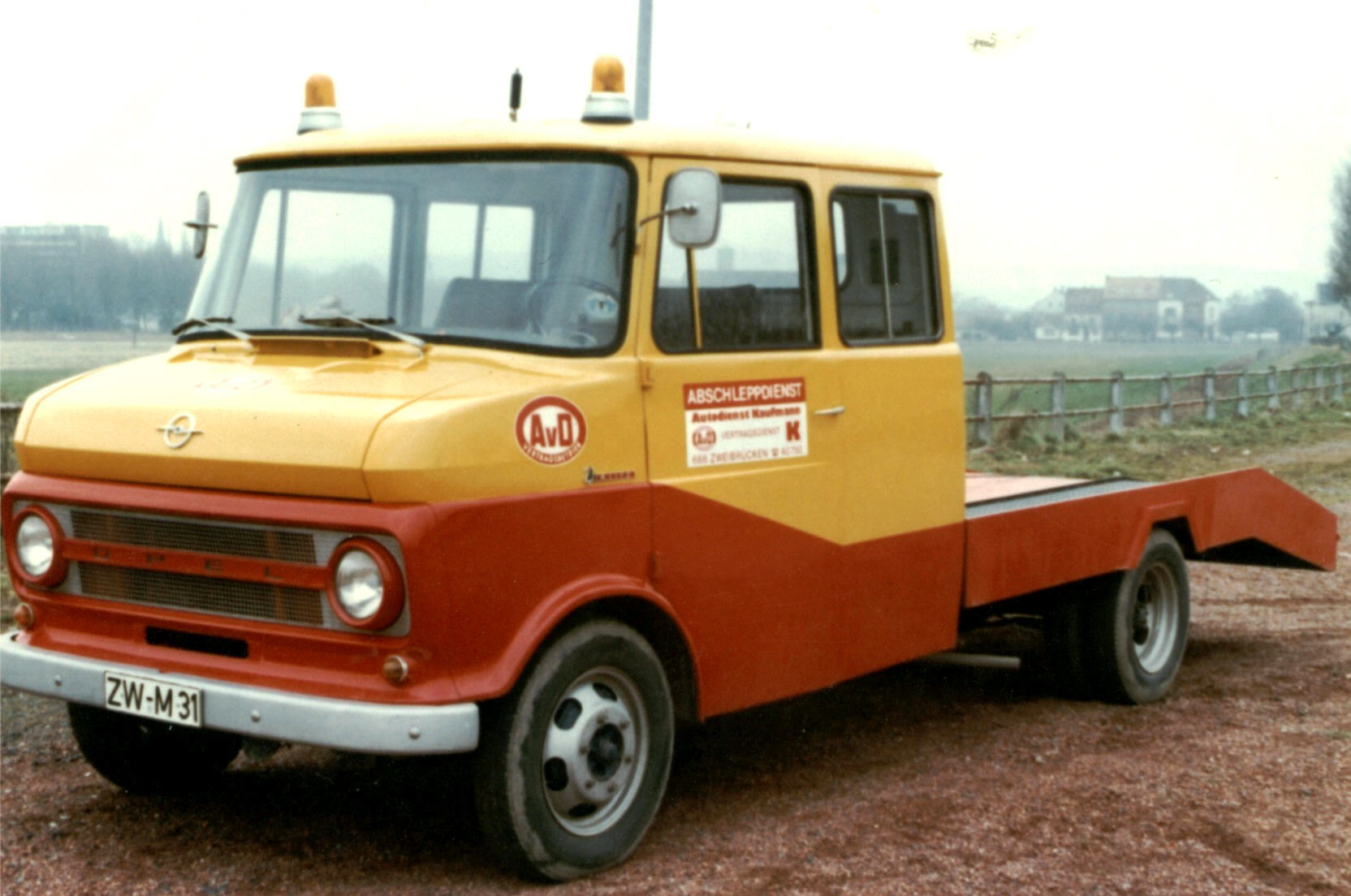
Opel Blitz Double Cab Tow Truck Early 80s (Build: Kaufmann Zweibrücken, Germany)

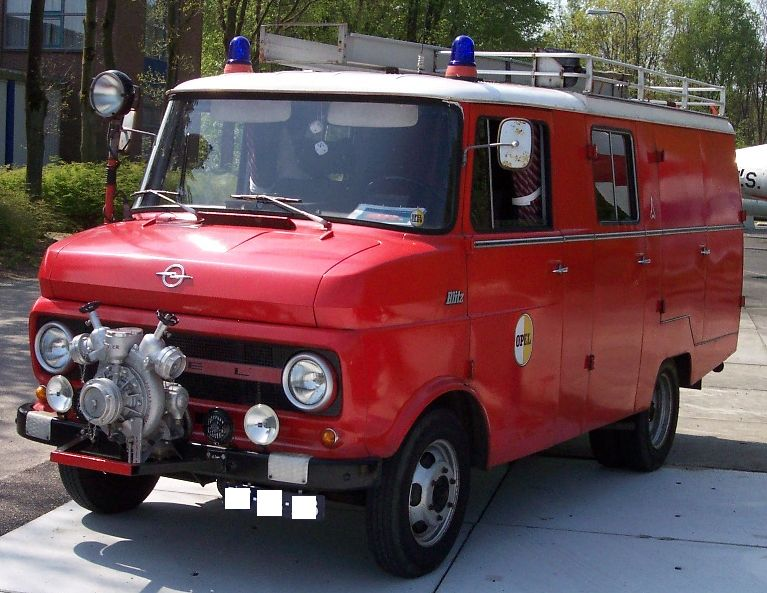
Late Model Opel Blitz B Fire Truck

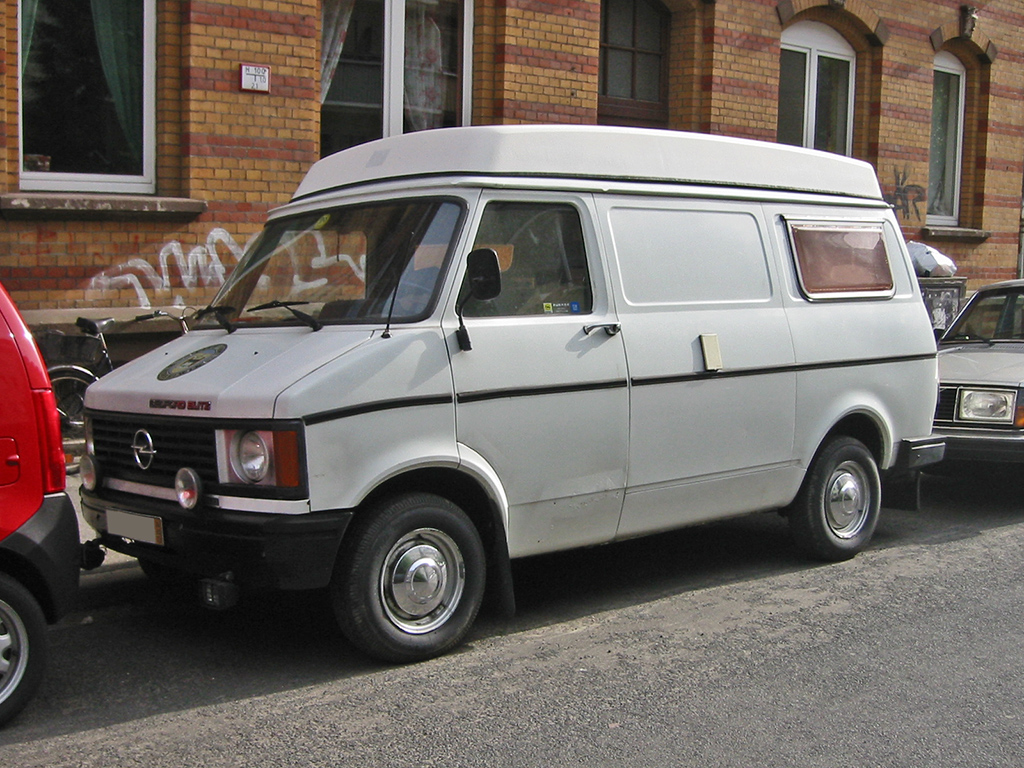
1980 Bedford Blitz
