= Mercedes-Benz L3000 =

German WWII truck

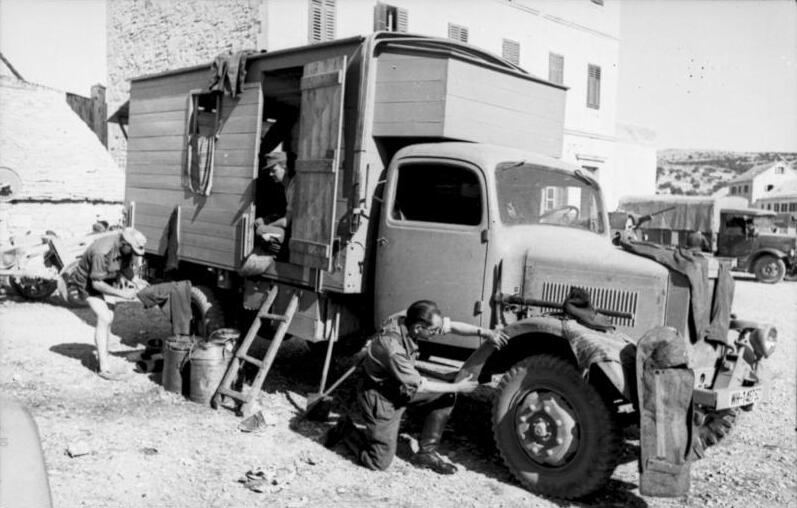
- Mercedes-Benz L 3000 S, Greece, 1943.
- Type: Truck
- Place of origin: Nazi Germany

Service history
- In service: 1938–1945
- Used by: Nazi Germany
- Wars: World War II

Production history
- Manufacturer: Mercedes-Benz
- Produced: 1938-1944
- No. built: 33,265
- Variants: L3000, L3000A, L3000S

Specifications
- Mass: 4,020 kg (8,860 lb)
- Length: 6.255 m (20 ft 6.3 in)
- Width: 2.350 m (7 ft 8.5 in)
- Height: 2.600 m (8 ft 6.4 in)
- Crew: 2
- Armor: none
- Engine: OM 65/4 4,849 cc (296 cu in) Diesel engine 55 kW (74 hp) at 2,250 rpm
- Payload capacity: 3,020 kg (6,660 lb)
- Ground clearance: 225 mm (8.9 in)
- Fuel capacity: 90 L (20 imp gal; 24 US gal)
- Maximum speed: 70 km/h (43 mph)

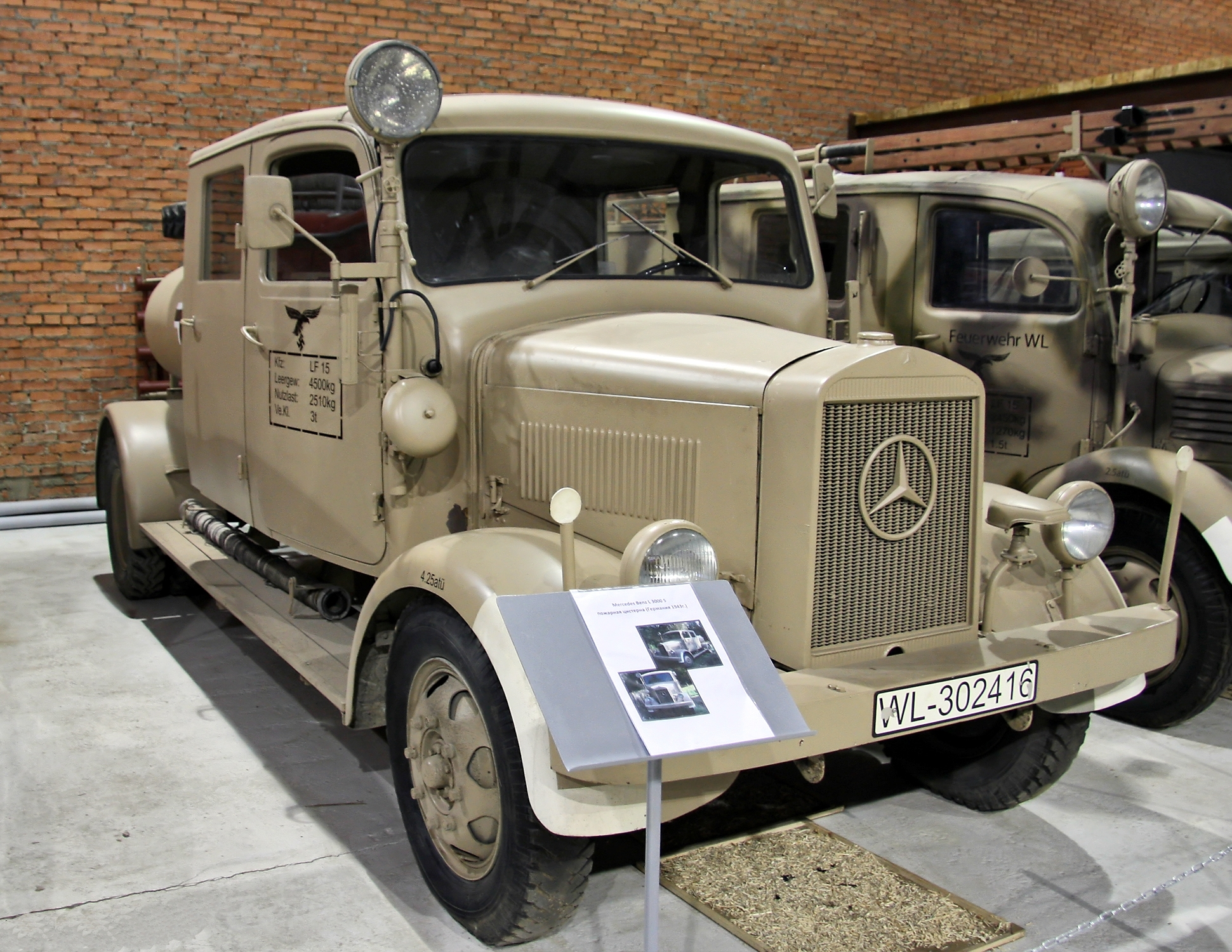
Mercedes-Benz L 3000S truck in a museum in Noginsk, Russia

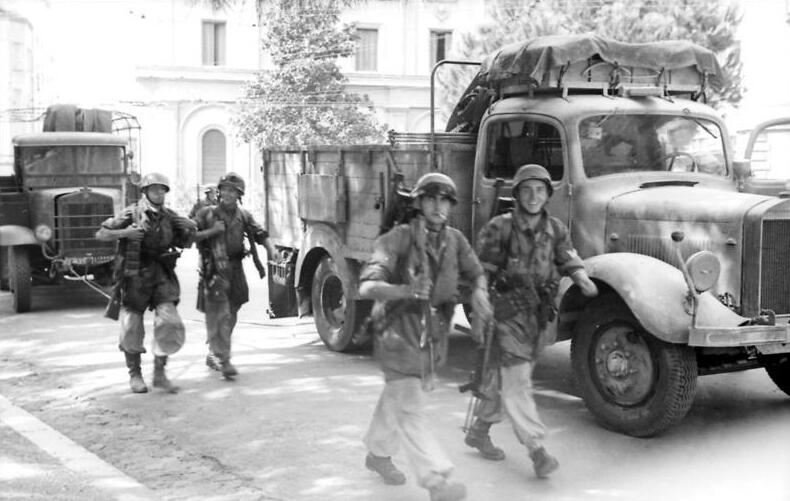
Mercedes-Benz L 3000 S in Italy with Fallschirmjäger, 1944

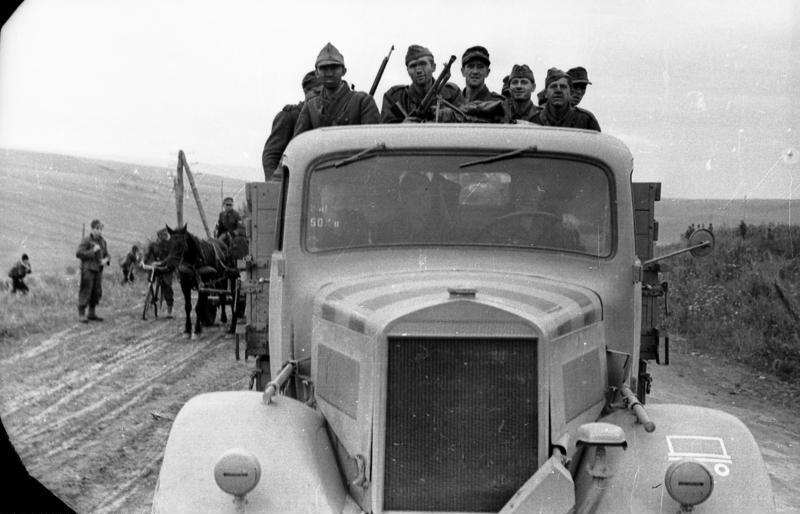
Romanian soldiers riding a Mercedes-Benz L 3000, Hungary, 1944

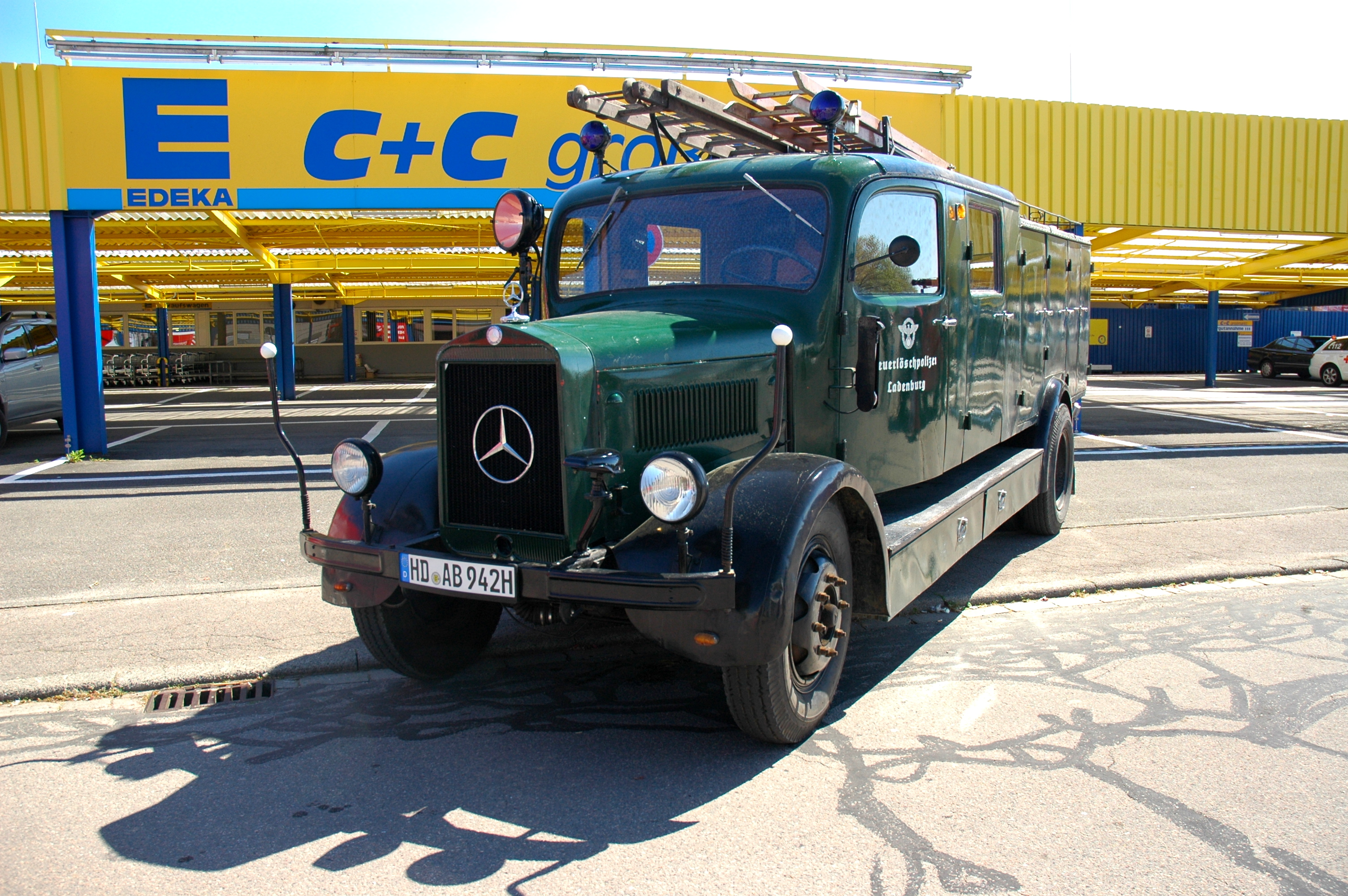
A vintage L3000 bearing markings of the Dossenheim Fire Police in 2016

The Mercedes-Benz L3000 was a 4x2 3-tonne rear axle drive truck used by Nazi Germany in World War II, powered by a Daimler-Benz OM 65/4 74 hp 4-cylinder diesel engine. It was used alongside the Opel Blitz, and proved even more reliable in rough terrain; and was used in all fronts and extensively by the Afrika Korps.

It was manufactured in three versions, the L3000, the L3000A, and the L3000S, from 1938 to 1944. When production was discontinued, more than 27,700 L3000 type trucks had been built, making it the most produced Mercedes-Benz truck of World War II.

== History ==
From 1896, Daimler Motoren Gesellschaft built not only passenger cars, but also light and heavy trucks with a payload of up to 10 tonnes (22,000 lb) for the civilian and military sectors. The Reichswehr also used 3-ton trucks as a personnel carrier. Daimler-Benz in 1934 produced some off-road test vehicles under the name Mercedes-Benz LG 63, which went on to successful testing as a Mercedes-Benz LG 3000 in mass production and were delivered from 1936 to the Wehrmacht, Reichspost, Reichsbahn and business operations.

The L3000 was used in all major theaters of World War II where German forces were deployed, and was also used by civilian fire departments.

== Variants ==
- L3000 - civil version
- L3000A - military version with all-wheel drive
- L3000S - military version using some standardized parts

== Technical data ==
L 3000 A
Dimensions and Weight
Length	6255 mm
Width	2350 mm
Height	2600 mm
Wheelbase	3800 mm
Front trackwidth	1633 mm
Rear trackwidth	1650 mm
Ground clearance	225 mm
Fording capability	700 mm
Turning diameter	15.2 m
Mass	4020 kg
Payload	3020 kg (2600 kg)
Max. total mass	7040 kg (6620 kg)
Further data
Top speed	70 km/h
Fuel consumption	20 L / 100 km (30 L / 100 km)
Fuel tank	90 L Diesel fuel
Lead acid battery	2 × 12 V, 90 Ah
Drivetrain
Clutch	Single disc dry clutch
Gearbox	Fivespeed gearbox with additional intermediate gearbox
Tyres	7.50-20 offroad tyres
Drive	All-wheel-drive
Engine
Model	OM 65/4
Type	Straight four diesel with precombustion chamber injection
Cooling system	Water
Valvetrain	OHV
Bore × Stroke	105 × 140 mm
Capacity	4,849 cc (296 cu in)
Compression ratio	20:1
Rated power	55 kW (74 hp) at 2250 rpm
Torque at rated power	234 N·m at 2250 rpm

() Figures in brackets: For driving offroad

== In popular culture ==
A replica of an L3000 based on the chassis of a GMC CCKW appears in the 1981 film Raiders Of The Lost Ark. It is involved in the film's most famous chase scene.

A modified Lo 2000 or L3000 truck carrying a detachment of SS Einsatzkommandos appears on the village arrival scene of the 1983 British Horror film The Keep, set in Romania in 1941.

== See also ==
- Mercedes-Benz Lo 2000
