= Stoewer Arkona =

Executive car manufactured by Stoewer between 1937 and 1940

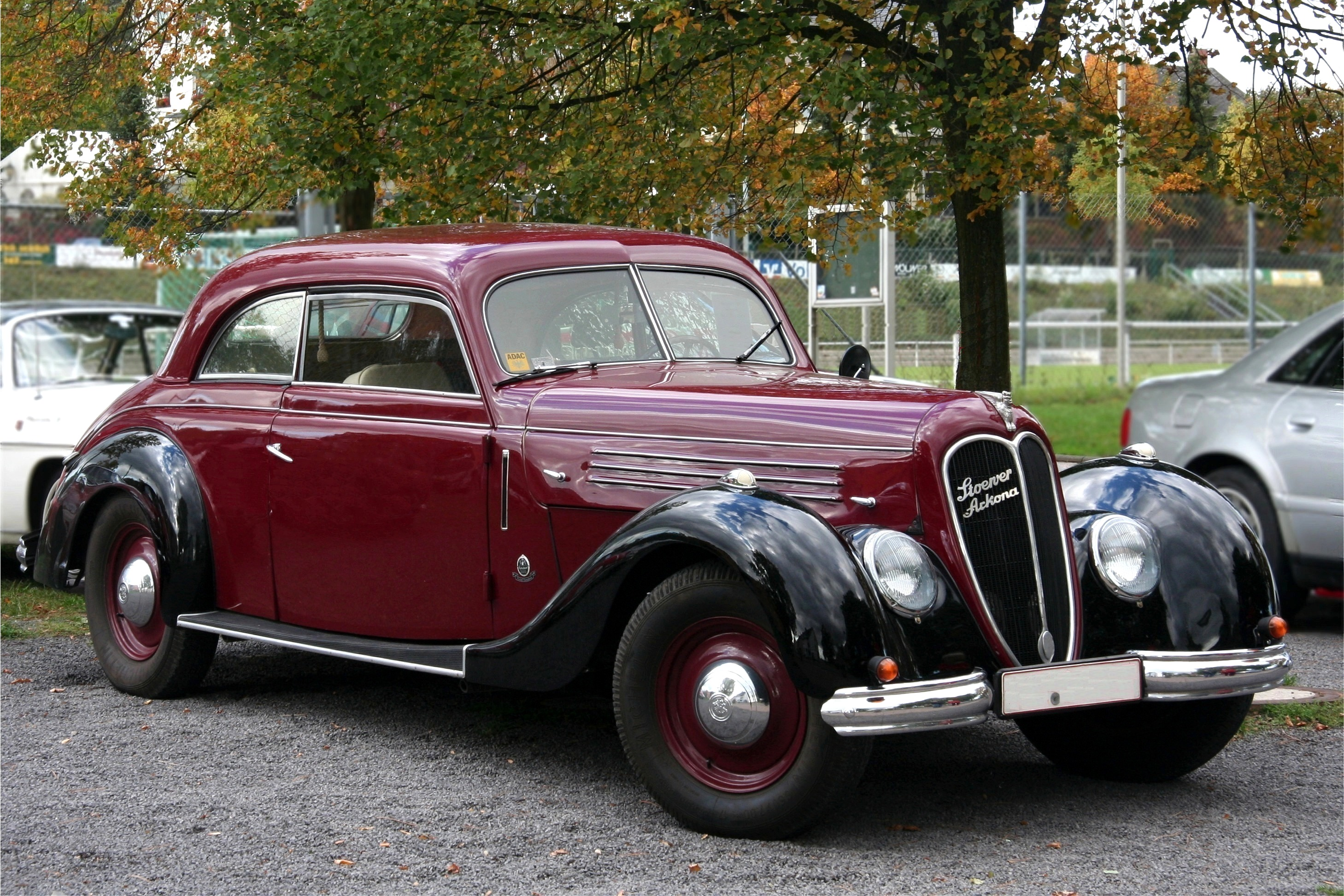

Overview
- Manufacturer: Stoewer
- Production: 1937–1940
- Assembly: Stettin, Germany (now Szczecin, Poland)

Body and chassis
- Class: Executive car
- Body style: sedan, limousine, touring, convertible, and roadster
- Related: Stoewer Sedina

Powertrain
- Engine: 3.6 L OHV I6
- Transmission: 4-speed

Dimensions
- Wheelbase: 3150 mm
- Length: 4900 mm (short version); 5100 mm (long version)
- Width: 1760 mm
- Height: 1750 m
- Curb weight: 1540-1710 kg (short version); 1760 kg (long version)

Chronology
- Predecessor: Stoewer Greif V8

Stoewer Arkona (German: [ˈʃtøː.vər arˈkoː.na]) is an executive car manufactured by Stoewer automotive company between 1937 and 1940. It has rear-wheel drive with a 3.6-litre six-cylinder overhead valve engine (the same engine as that in the Sedina, with two more cylinders) and was available in touring, sedan, convertible, and roadster versions. Together with its sister model, the Sedina, it was the last civilian car manufactured by the company.

== History ==
Harry S. Truman, the president of the United States, standing in Stoewer Arkona, while inspecting units of the 3rd Armored Division of the United States Army near Frankfurt, Germany, on 26 July 1945.

Stoewer Arkona was manufactured in Stettin, Germany (now Szczecin, Poland) by Stoewer automotive company between 1937 and 1940. It was named after Cape Arkona, the cape on Rügen island in Mecklenburg-Western Pomerania. In 1939, 103 pieces were produced. By 1940, 201 cars were made. It was a successor to Stoewer Greif V8. Together with its sister model, Sedina, it was the last civilian car manufactured by the company, until 1940, when it had switched to the military manufacture and realization of the Einheits-PKW der Wehrmacht plan, due to the World War II.

== Specifications ==
The car was manufactured in 2 size versions, which included shorter 4-door sedan, 2-door convertible, and 2-door roadster, and longer 6-seater touring, and 4-door limousine. It has 3.6-litre in-line four-strokes six-cylinder overhead valve engine, that has that had 80 horsepower (59 kW), and 12 Volt electric power. The car has rear-wheel drive, and beam axle, being the first vehicle of the company to do so, alongside its sister model, Sedina. It also has six-speed transmission. The front wheels are individually suspended from two transverse leaf springs, while the rear wheels are on the beam axle are suspended on the semi-elliptical leaf springs. Its hood ornament had a form of the griffin from the coat of arms of Szczecin.

The top speed of the shorter version is 140 km/h (87 mph), and the longer, 120 km/h (74.6 mph). The stroke ratio is 85 mm × 106 mm. The fuel consumption of the shorter version is 17 litres per 100 km, while the longer, 18 litres per 100 km. The weight of the shorter version is, depending on its category, 1540 and 1710 kg, with a working load limit, subsequently 2040 and 2210 kg. The weight of the longer version is 1760 kg with the working load limit of 2295 kg. The shorter version is 4900 mm long, while the longer version, 5100 mm. Both versions of the car are 1760 mm wide, 1750 mm high, and have a wheelbase of 3150 mm, and the axle track of 1440 mm.

== Gallery ==
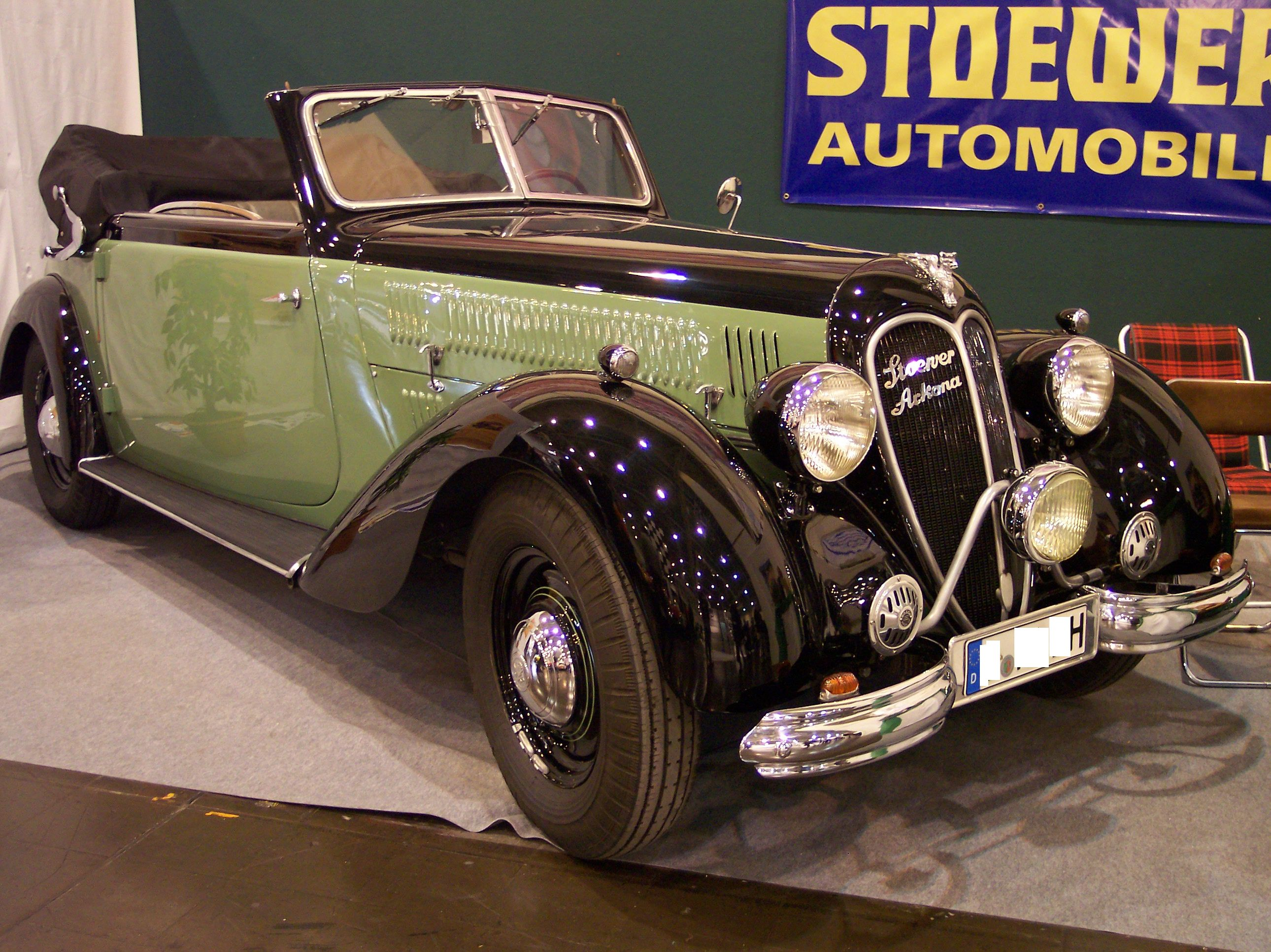
1939 convertible version with opened roof.

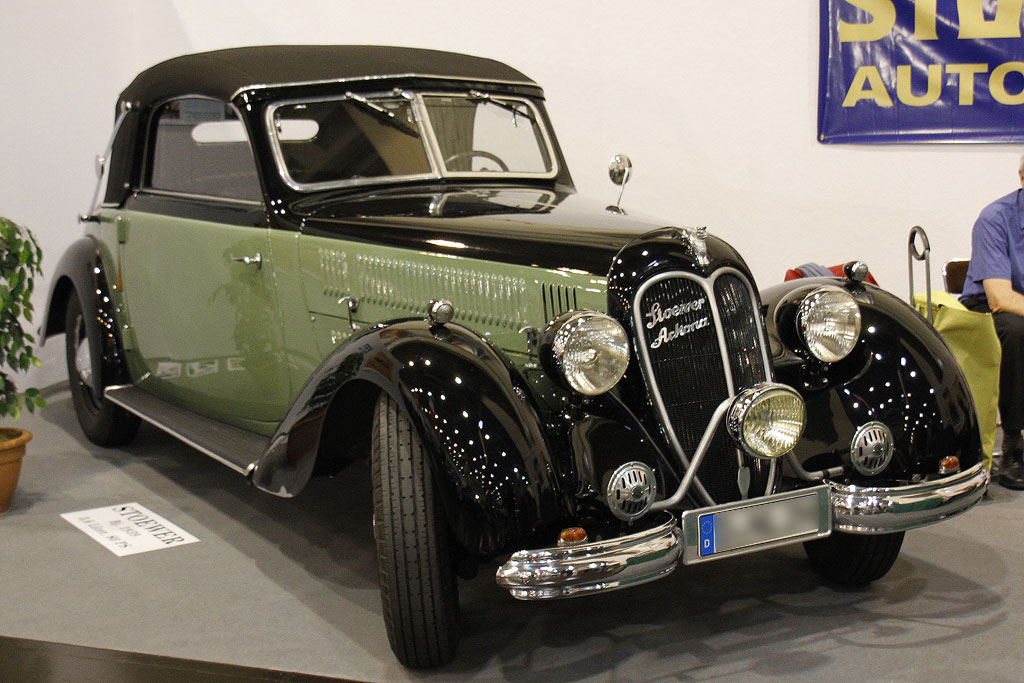
1939 convertible version with closed roof.

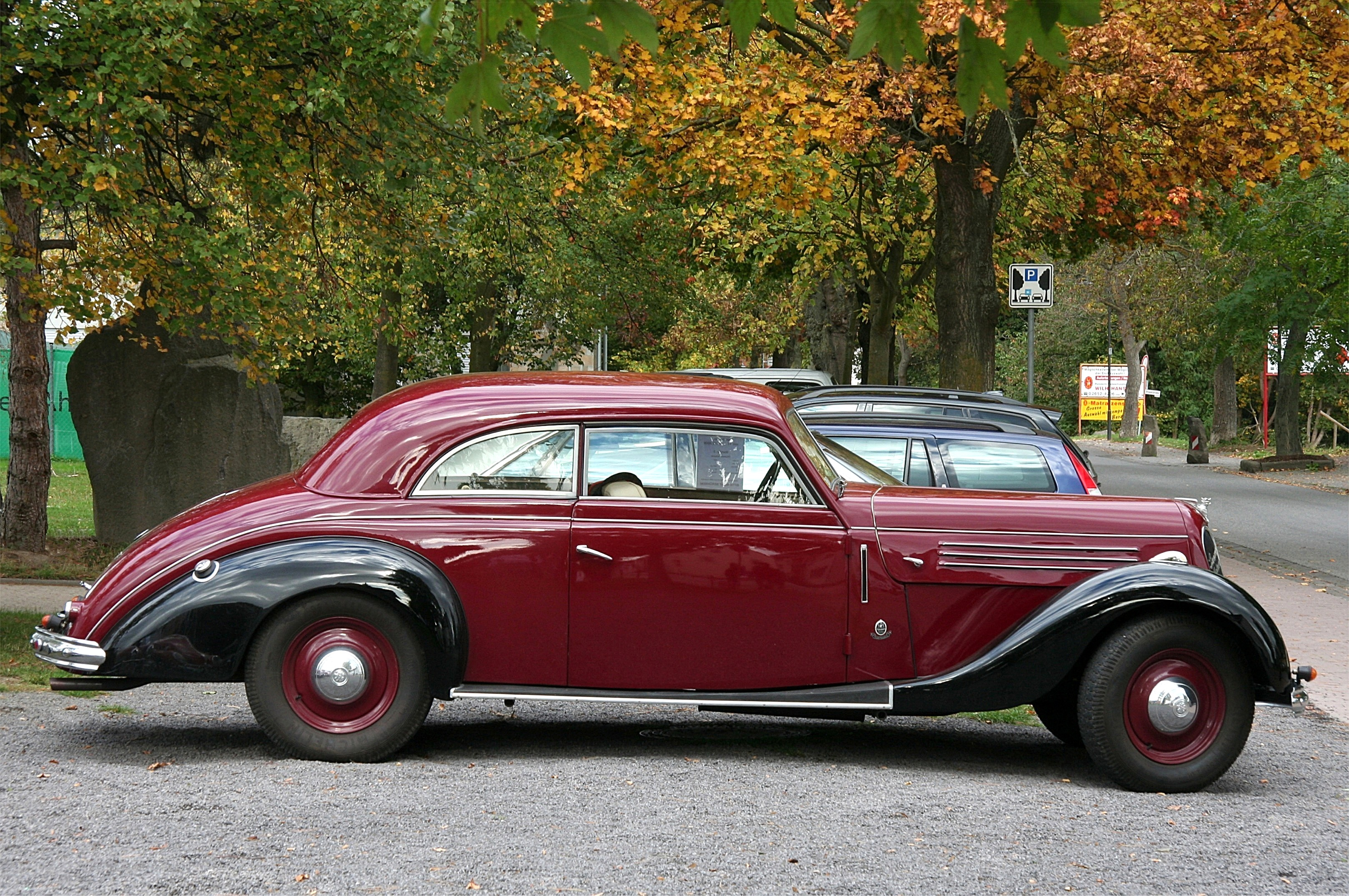
Side of 1940 sedan version.

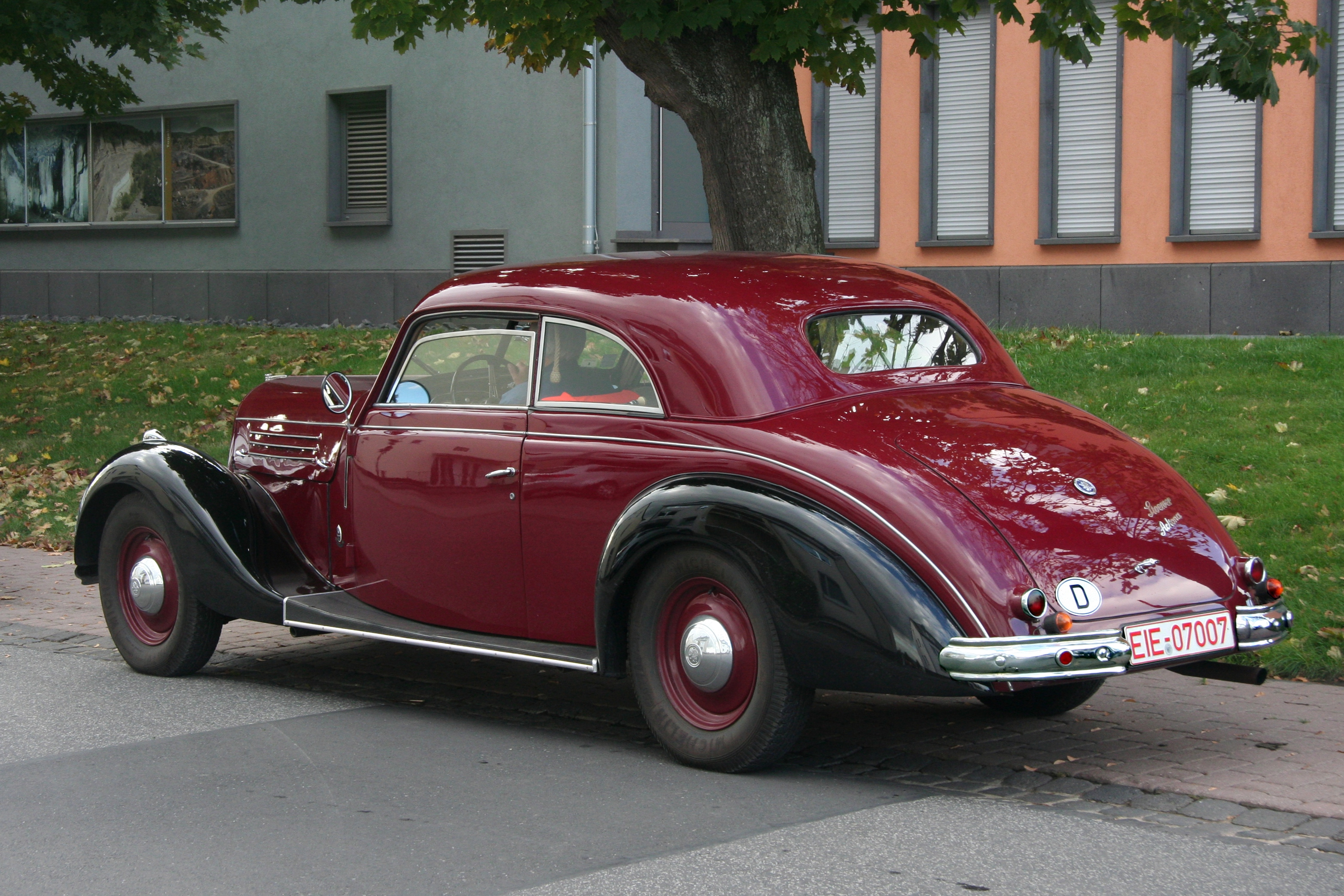
Back of 1940 sedan version.

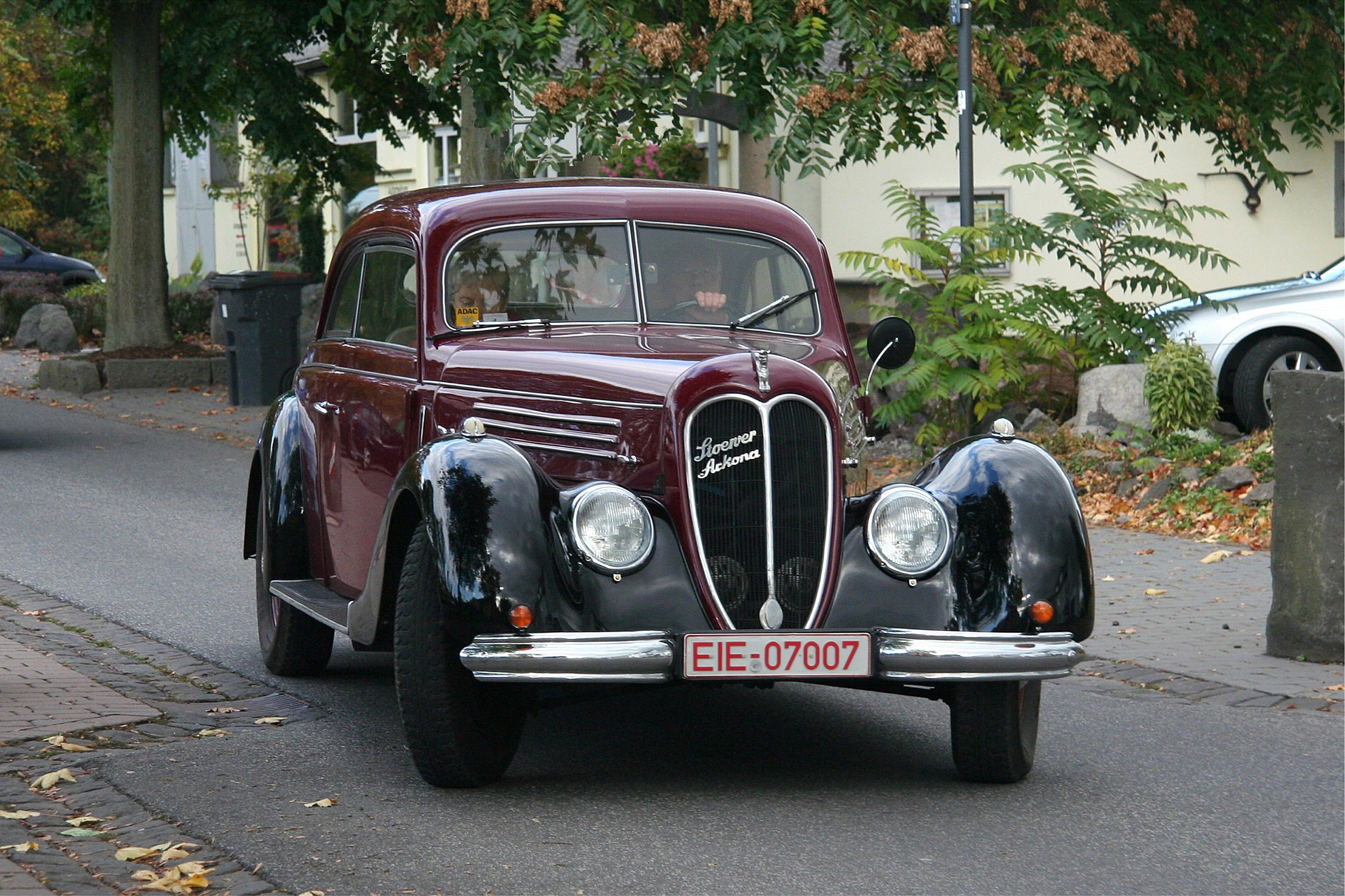
Front of 1940 sedan version.

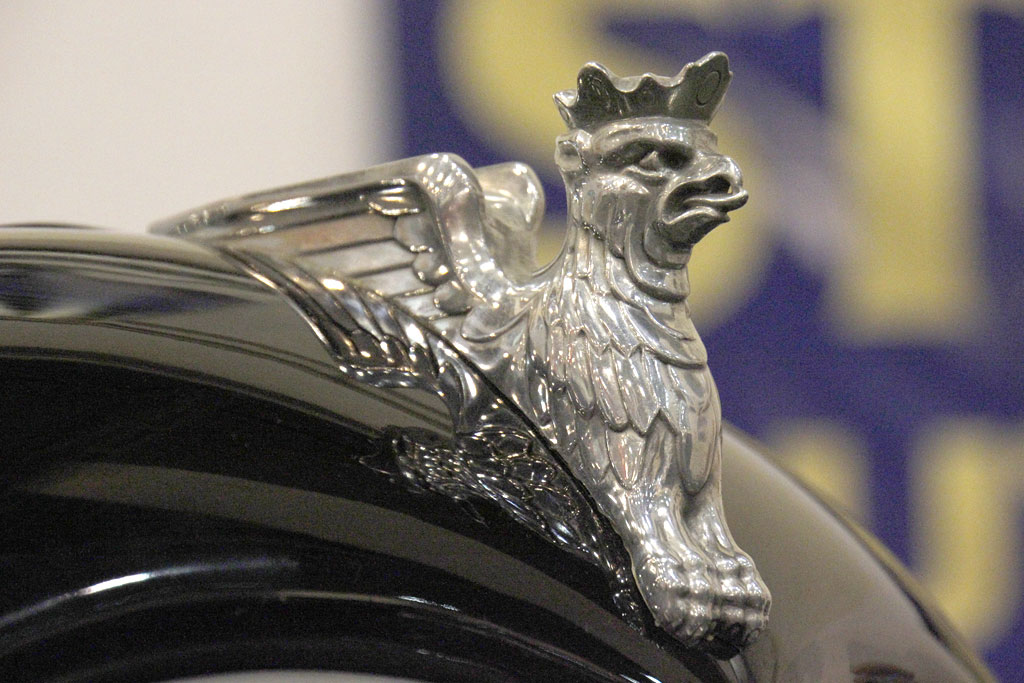
Hood ornament of the car, in form of the griffin from the coat of arms of Szczecin.

== Bibliography ==
- Werner Oswald, Deutsche Autos 1920–1945. 10th edition. Motorbuch Verlag, Stuttgart, 1996, ISBN 3879435197.
