= Stoewer Sedina =

Executive car manufactured by Stoewer between 1937 and 1940

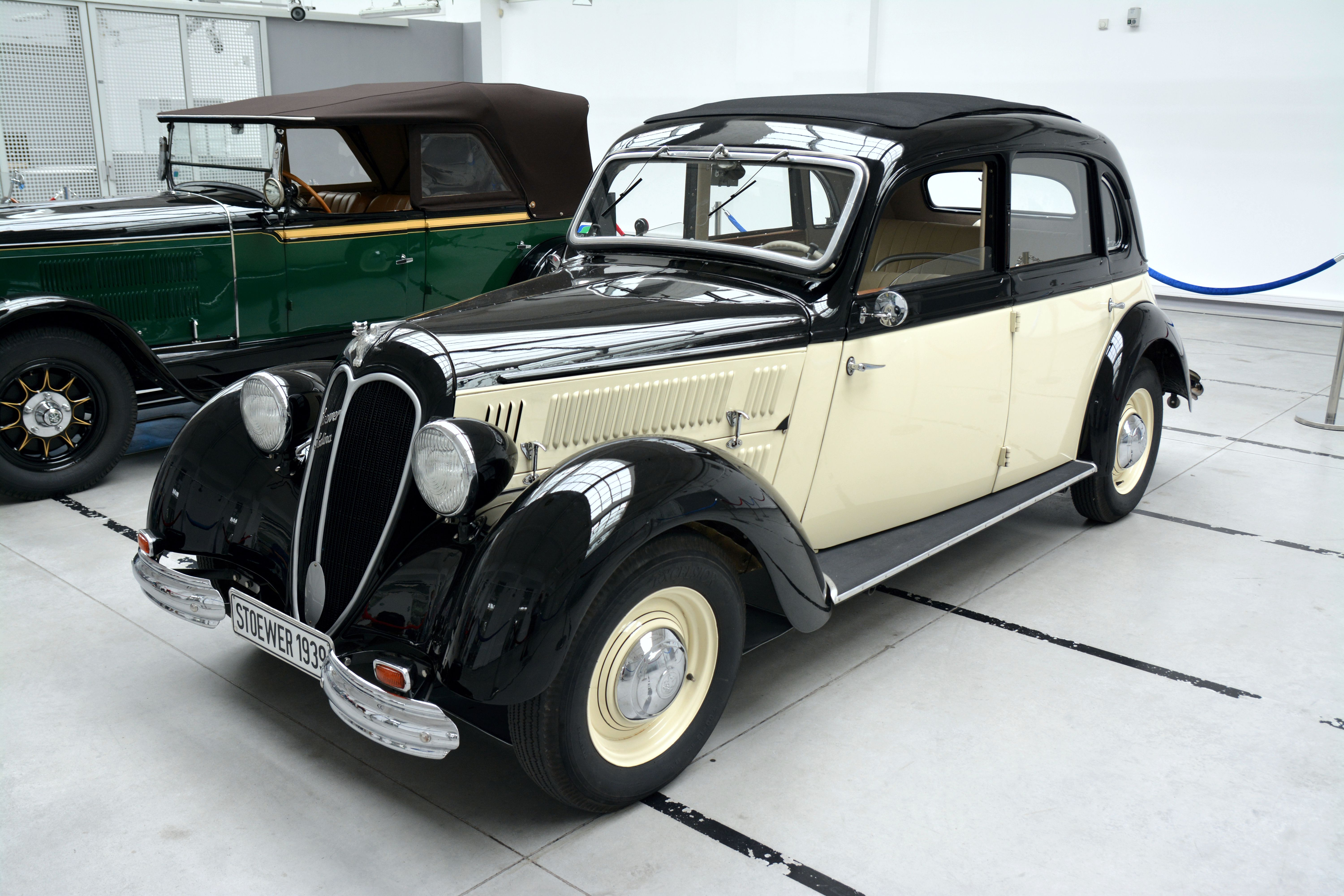

Overview
- Manufacturer: Stoewer
- Production: 1937–1940
- Assembly: Stettin, Germany (now Szczecin, Poland

Body and chassis
- Class: Executive car
- Body style: sedan, convertible
- Related: Stoewer Arkona

Powertrain
- Engine: 2.4-liter four-cylinder Otto OHV
- Transmission: 6-speed

Dimensions
- Wheelbase: 2900 mm
- Length: 4600 mm
- Width: 1720 mm
- Height: 1600 mm

Stoewer Sedina (German: [ˈʃtøː.vər zeˈdi.na] is an executive car manufactured by Stoewer automotive company between 1937 and 1940. It has rear-wheel drive with 2.4-litre four-cylinder overhead valve engine and is available in sedan and convertible versions.

== History ==
Stoewer Sedina was manufactured in Stettin, Germany (now Szczecin, Poland) by Stoewer automotive company between 1937 and 1940. It was named after Sedina, a fictional woman that is a personification of the city of Szczecin. In 1939, 480 pieces were produced. By 1940, 924 cars were made. Together with its twin model, Stoewer Arkona, it was the last civilian car manufactured by the company, until 1940, when it had switched to the military manufacture and realization of the Einheits-PKW der Wehrmacht plan, due to the World War II.

== Specifications ==
The car was manufactured in versions: 4-door sedan, 4-door Pullman-type sedan, and 2-door convertible. It has 2.4-litre four-cylinder Otto overhead valve engine with side camshaft, that has that had 55 (40 kW) horsepower, and 6 Volt electric power, while it consumes 15 litres of fuel per 100 km. Its engine was located in front. The car has rear-wheel drive, and beam axle, being the first vehicle of the company to do so, alongside its sister model, Arkona. It also has six-speed transmission. The front wheels are individually suspended from two transverse leaf springs, while the rear wheels are on the beam axle are suspended on the semi-elliptical leaf springs. Its hood ornament had a form of the griffin from the coat of arms of Szczecin.

Its top speed is 110 km/h (68.35 mph). The stroke ratio is 85 mm × 106 mm. The car weighs 1360 kg (2998.3 lbs), with a working load limit of 1745 kg (3847.1 lbs), and a capacity of 2406 cm³. It is 4600 mm long, 1720 mm wide, 1600 mm high, and has a wheelbase of 2900 mm. The axle track is 1430 mm.

== Gallery ==
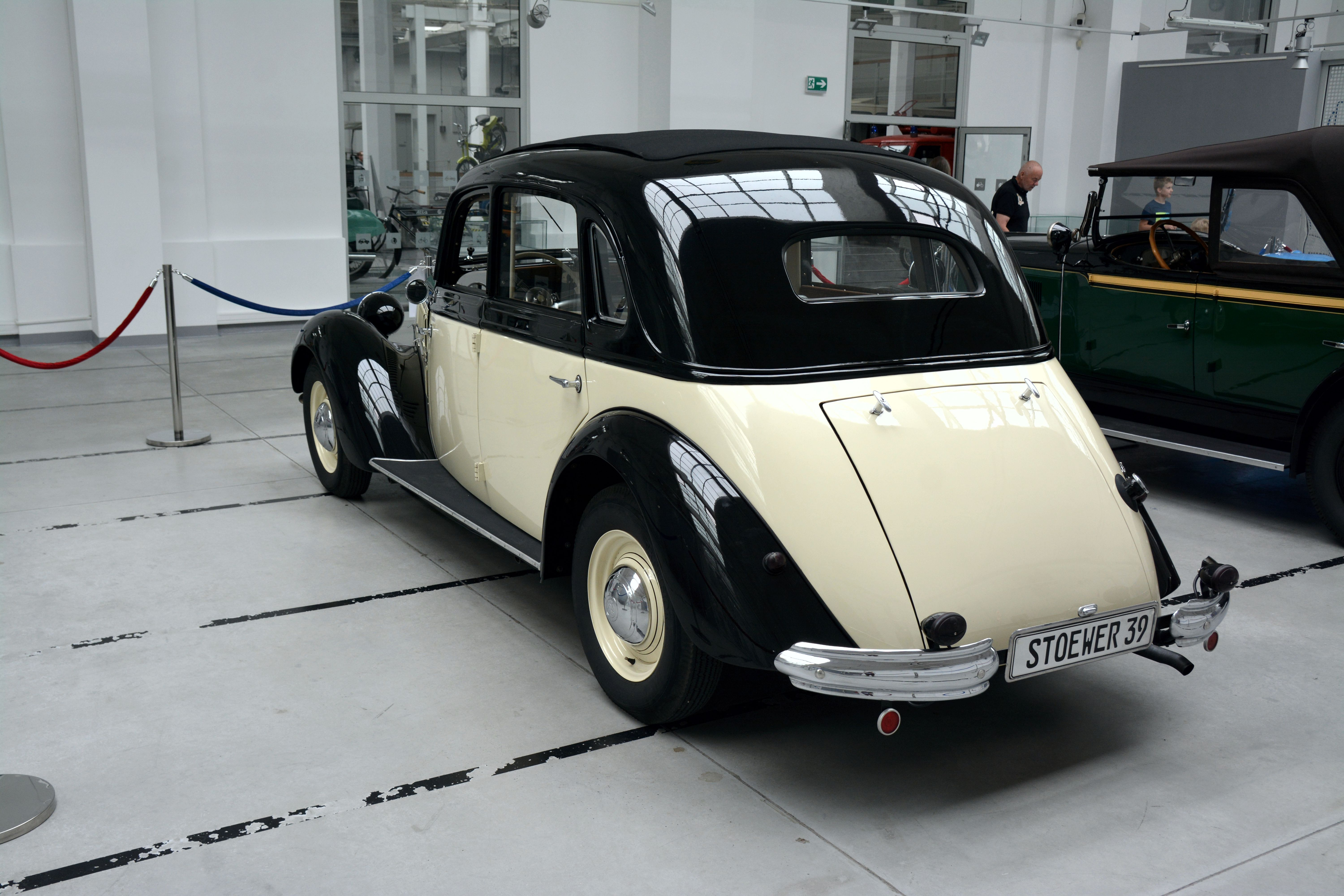
Back of sedan version.

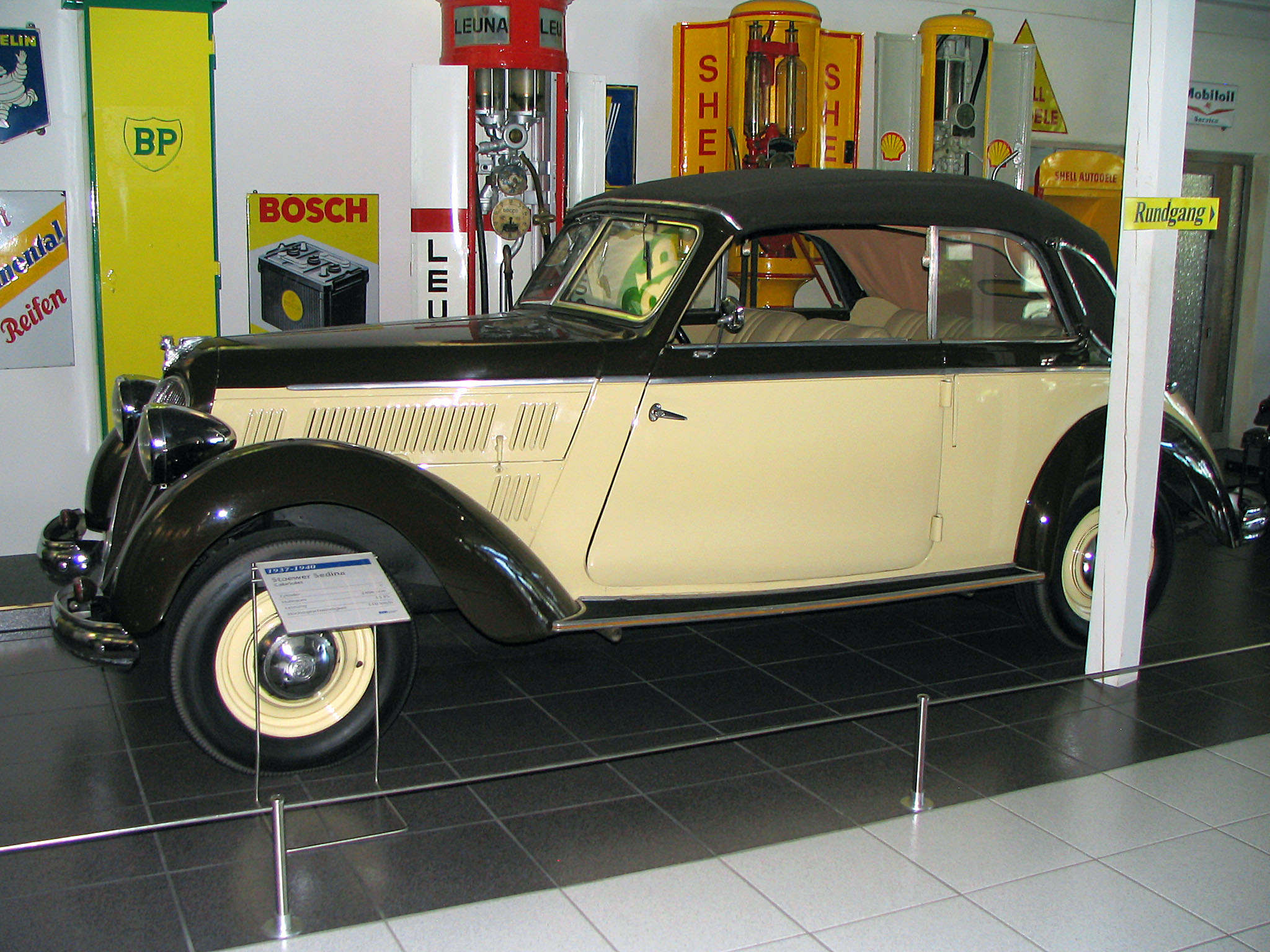
Convertible version.

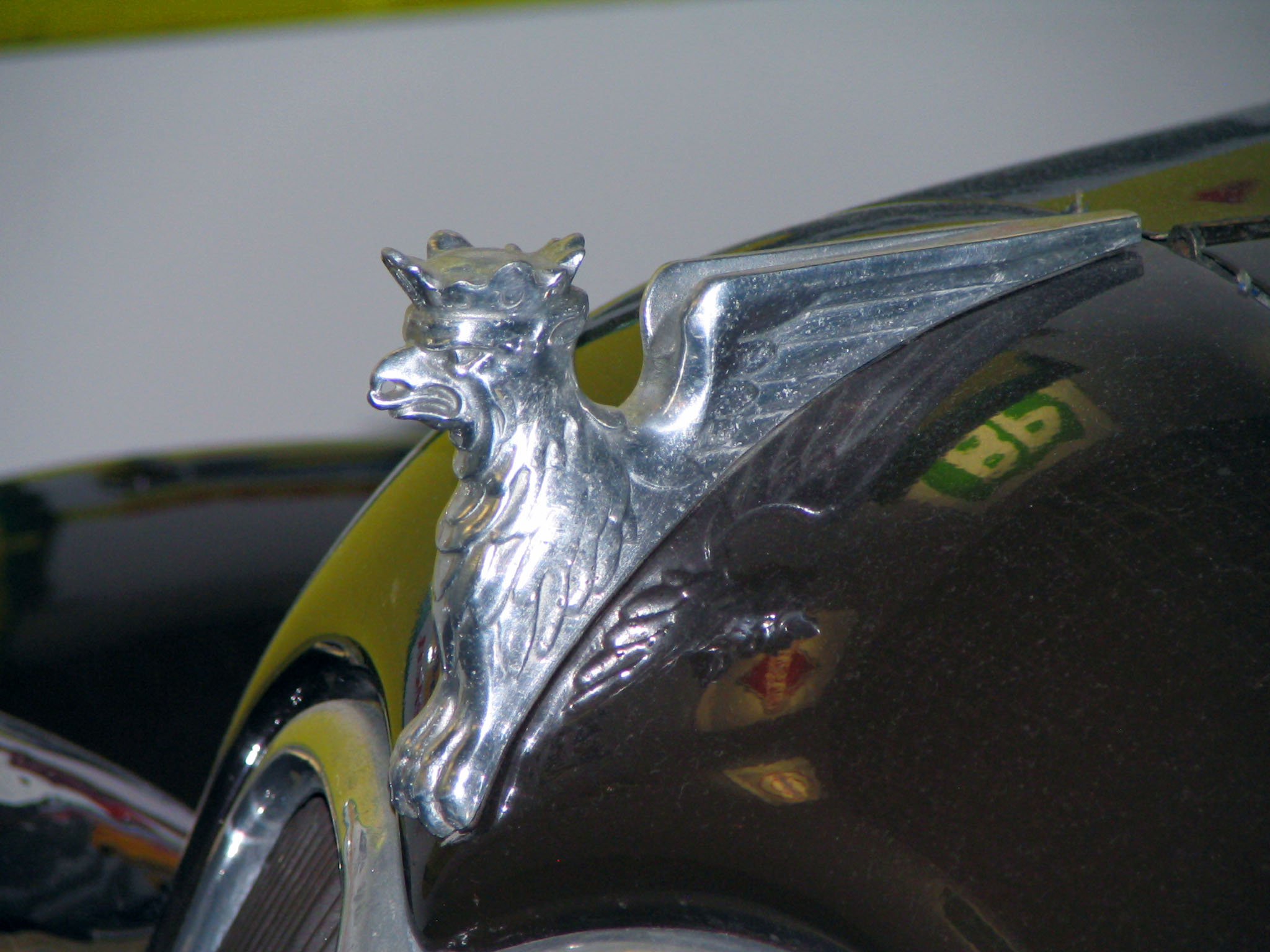
Hood ornament of the car, in form of the griffin from the coat of arms of Szczecin.

== Bibliography ==
- Werner Oswald, Deutsche Autos 1920–1945. 10th edition. Motorbuch Verlag, Stuttgart, 1996, ISBN 3-87943-519-7.
- P. Migdalski, Udział samochodów z fabryki Stoewera w zawodach sportowych. Przyczynek do historii sportu samochodowego na Pomorzu w latach 1919–1939 in Przegląd Zachodniopomorski, vol. 17., 2002
