= Tornado (car) =

Tornado I Tornado II
- Category: Formula Libre
- Designer: Ted Gray

Technical specifications
- Chassis: Steel ladder frame, fiberglass or aluminum body
- Suspension (front): Gransverse front springs, transverse leaf springs, stub axles with fabricated top wishbones, and telescopic shock absorbers, anti-roll bar (Independent suspension)
- Suspension (rear): de Dion, Semi-elliptic, radius rods, telescopic shock absorbers (Independent suspension)
- Axle track: 50 in (1,300 mm) (front); 48–49 in (1,200–1,200 mm) (rear)
- Wheelbase: 90 in (2,300 mm)
- Engine: Ford or Chevrolet 256–283 cu in (4.2–4.6 L) (1965-1970); 159 cu in (2.6 L) (1968-1970); 16-valve, OHV V8, naturally-aspirated mid-mounted
- Transmission: 4-speed manual
- Power: ~ 274–380 hp (204–283 kW); 300 lb⋅ft (410 N⋅m)
- Brakes: Drum brakes all-round

Competition history

Tornado was the name of two open-wheel race cars, raced by Ted Gray, and used to compete in Formula Libre races, between 1956 and 1958. The original car was powered by a Ford flathead V8 engine, and the second version was powered by a Corvette-derived small-block engine.
