= Hay Market Square (Szczecin) =

Urban square in Warsaw, Poland

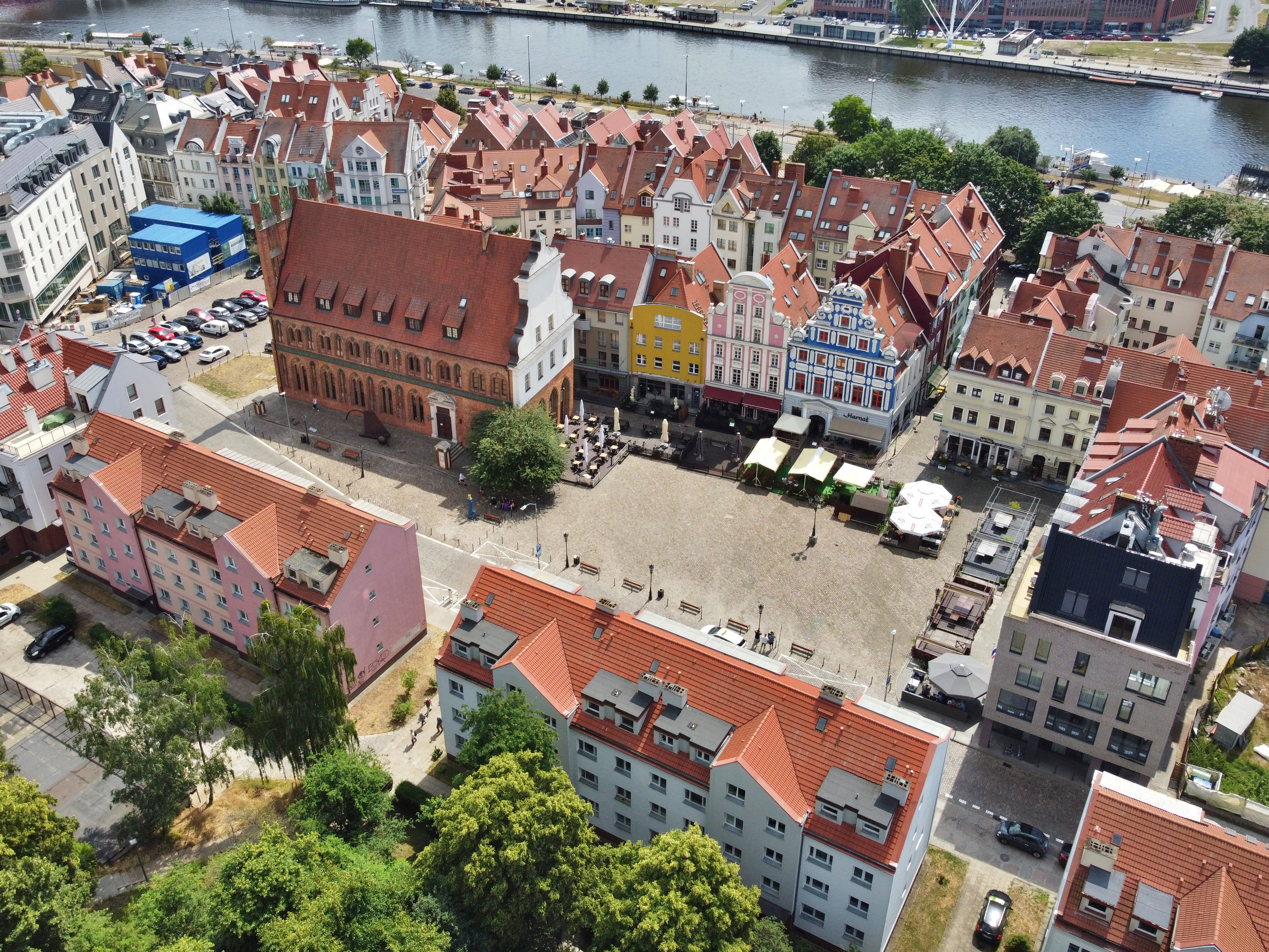
- The Hay Market Square in 2021.

- Location within Poland
- Type: Urban square
- Location: Szczecin, Poland
- Coordinates: 53°25′27.2″N 14°33′35.0″E
- North: Księcia Mściwoja II Street
- South: Sienna Street

The Hay Market Square (Polish: Rynek Sienny; German: Heumarkt) is an urban square in Szczecin, Poland. It is located between Sienna and Księcia Mściwoja II Streets, within the Old Town neighbourhood of the Downtown district. It was developed in the Middle Ages as a market place. One of buildings neighbouring it is the Old Town Hall, dating to the 15th century.

== History ==
The market place was developed in the Middle Ages. In 1310, its name was recorded in Latin as forum antiquum, meaning the Old Market Place, and after 1325, it began being referred to as the Hay Market Square, after the hay being one of the products sold there.

In the 15th century, at its corner was constructed the Old Town Hall with Gothic architecture, in place of the previous wooden building. In the 17th century, it was rebuilt in the Baroque style.

In 1835, at the western end of the square was opened the stock exchange building, replacing the sailor accommodations.

In 1879, the Old Town Hall ceased to house the municipal government, with its spaces being rented to private businesses. In the late 19th century, around the square were constructed tenement houses, mostly designed in the Baroque style, later refurbished in the eclectist style.

The architecture around the square was heavily damaged in the aearial bombing during the Second World War, with the building burning down. The Old Town Hall was rebuilt after the conflict, while the other ruins were cleared out. Later, alongside southern side were constructed apparent buildings. The buildings at the north and west sides were built in the 1990s, some of which replicated the previous tenements.

In 1945, it, together with the nearby New Market Square, were both renamed to the Rzepicha Square (Polish: Plac Rzepichy), after Rzepicha, a wife of legendary figure, Piast the Wheelwright, seen as the founder of the Piast dynasty. It was also commonly referred to as the Old Market Square. In 1995, the Hay Market Square and the New Market Square received their former names.

== Overview ==
The urban square is placed between Sienna and Księcia Mściwoja II Street. It is surrounded with the Old Town Hall, and apartment buildings, including the reconstructions of historic 19th century tenement houses.

== Gallery ==
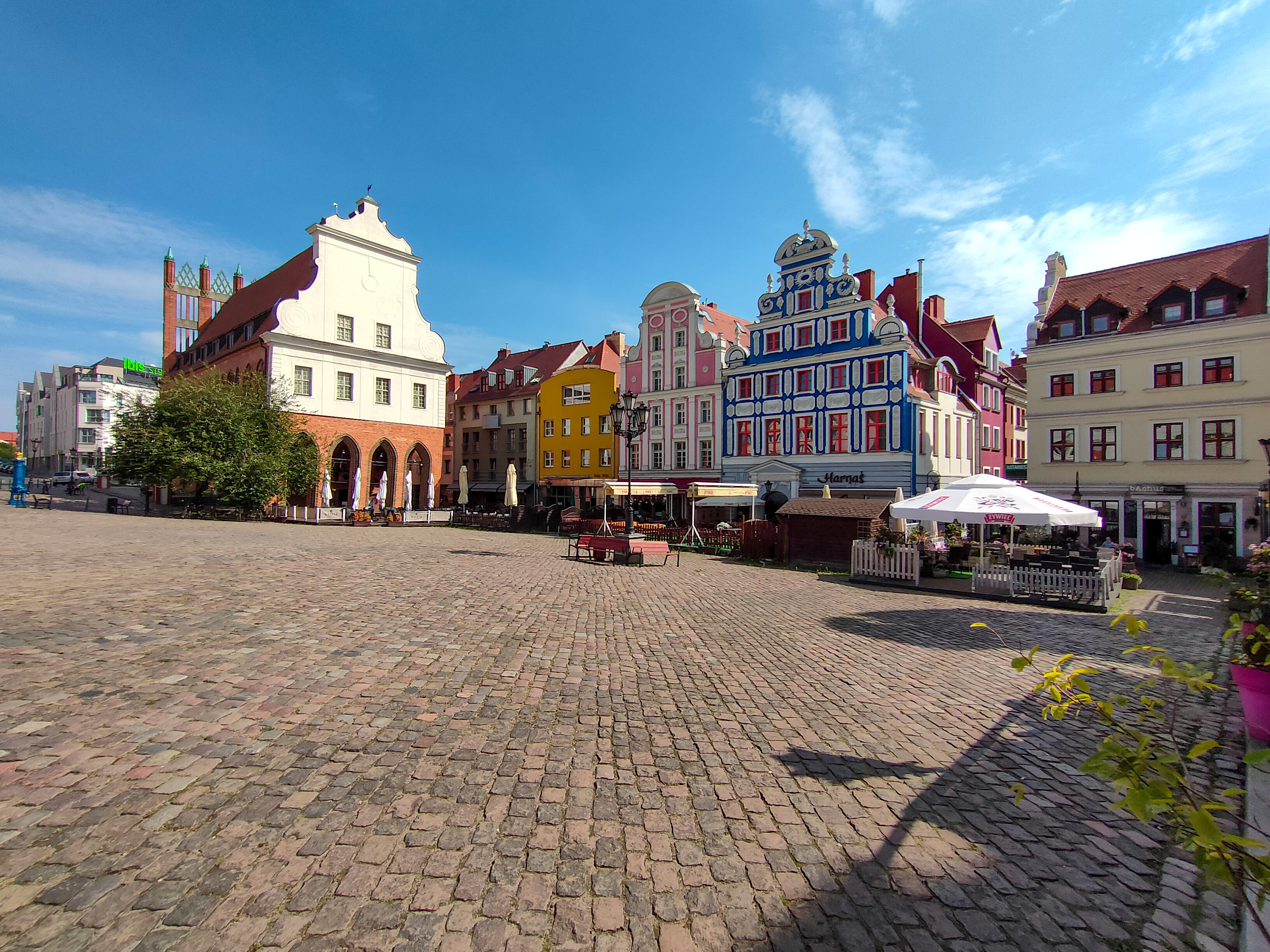
South side of the square

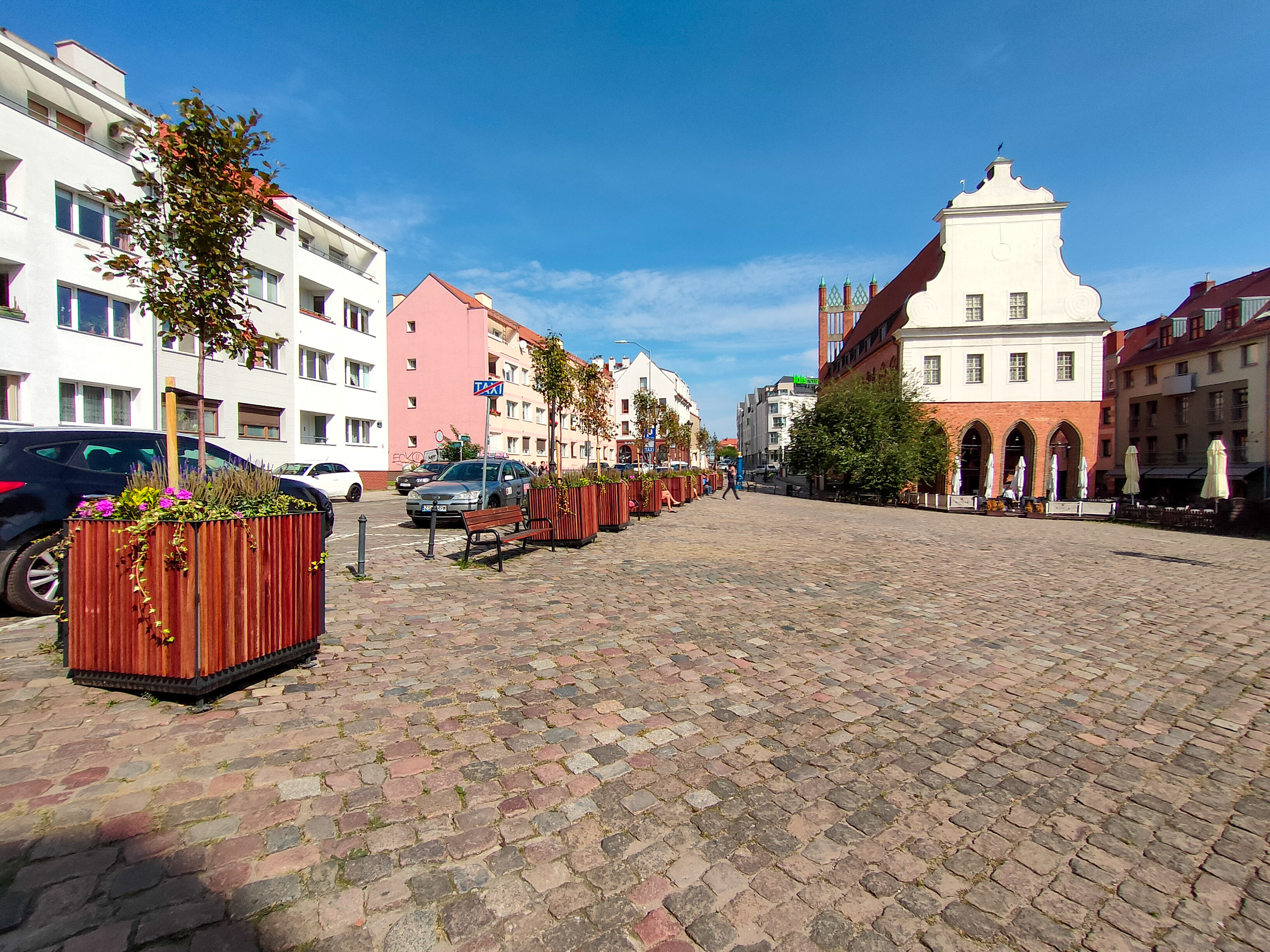
North side of the square .

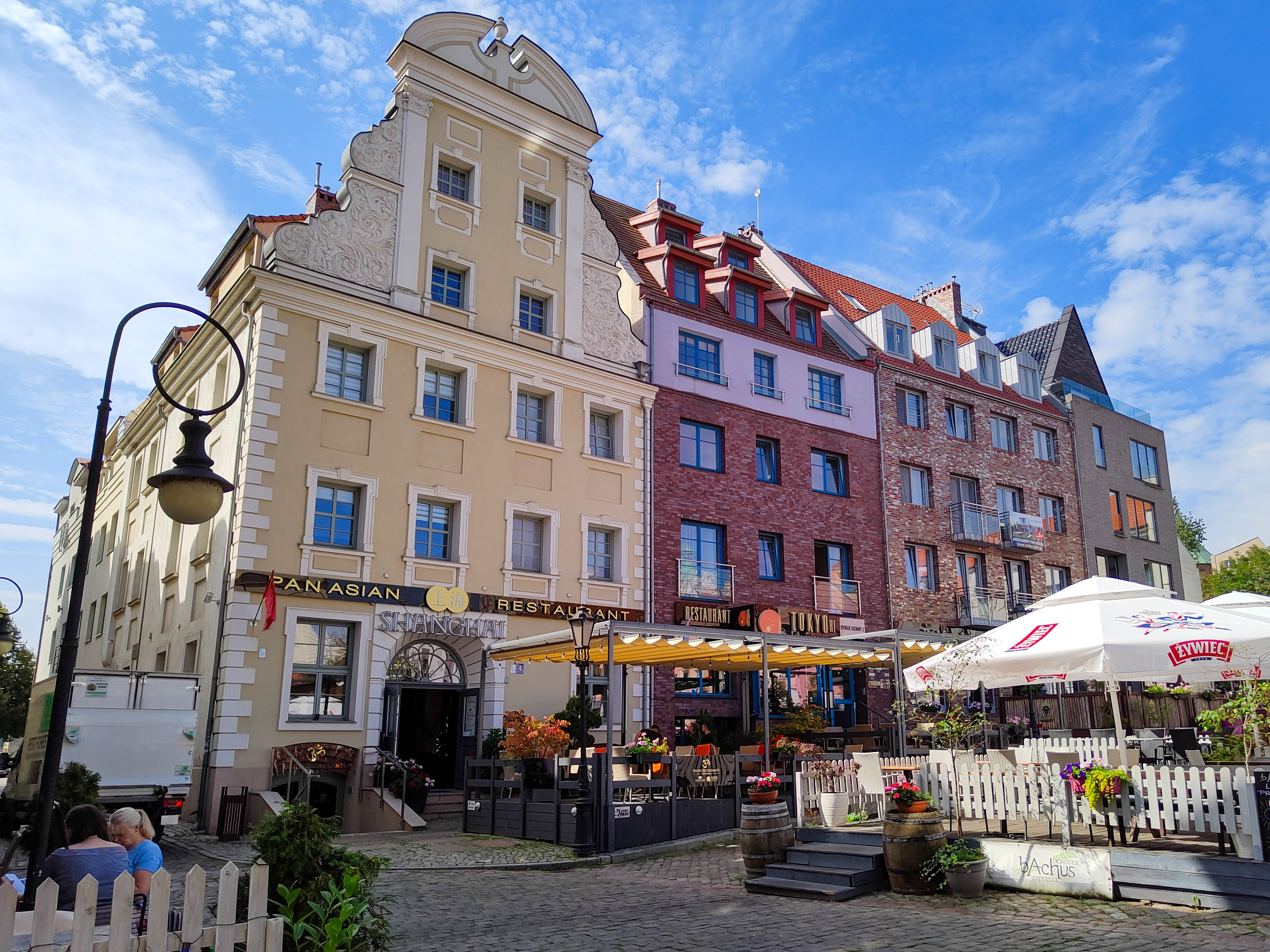
West side of the square.

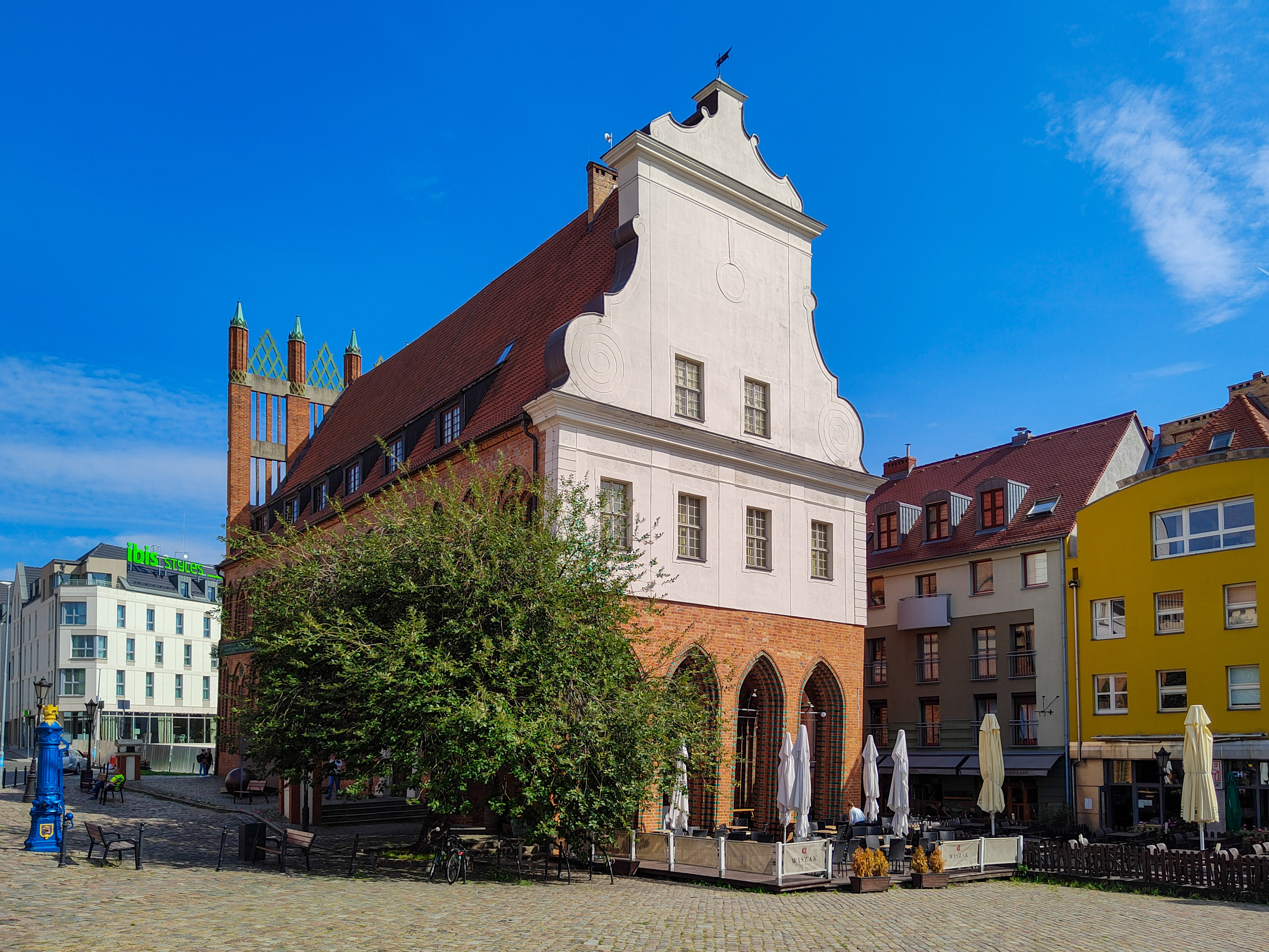
The Old Town Hall.

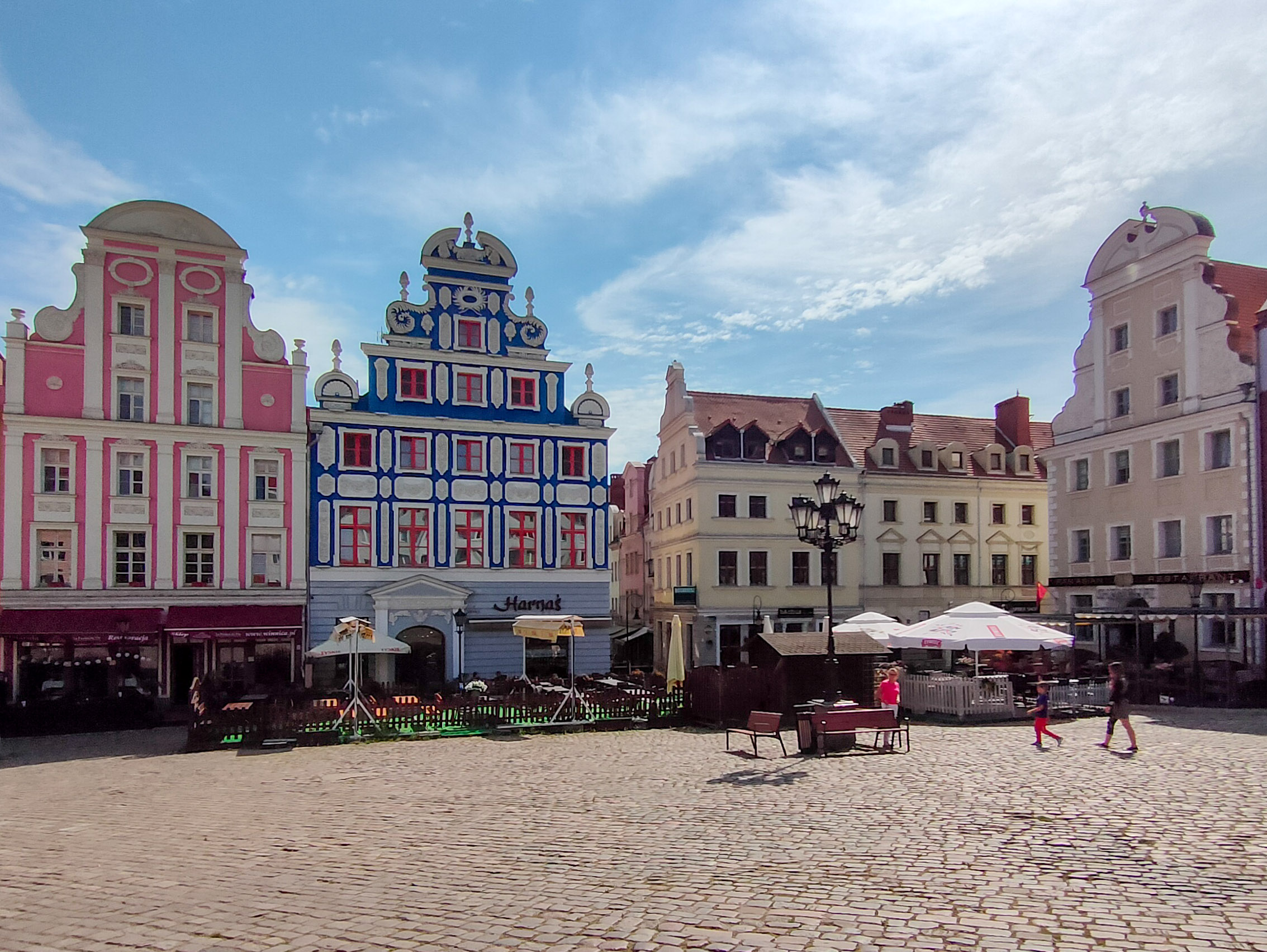
Tenement houses at the northwestern corner.

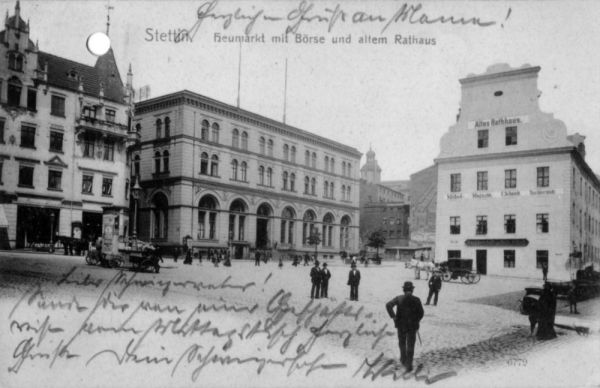
The stock exchange building in the 1900s.
