= Red Town Hall (Szczecin) =

Historic town hall building in Szczecin, Poland

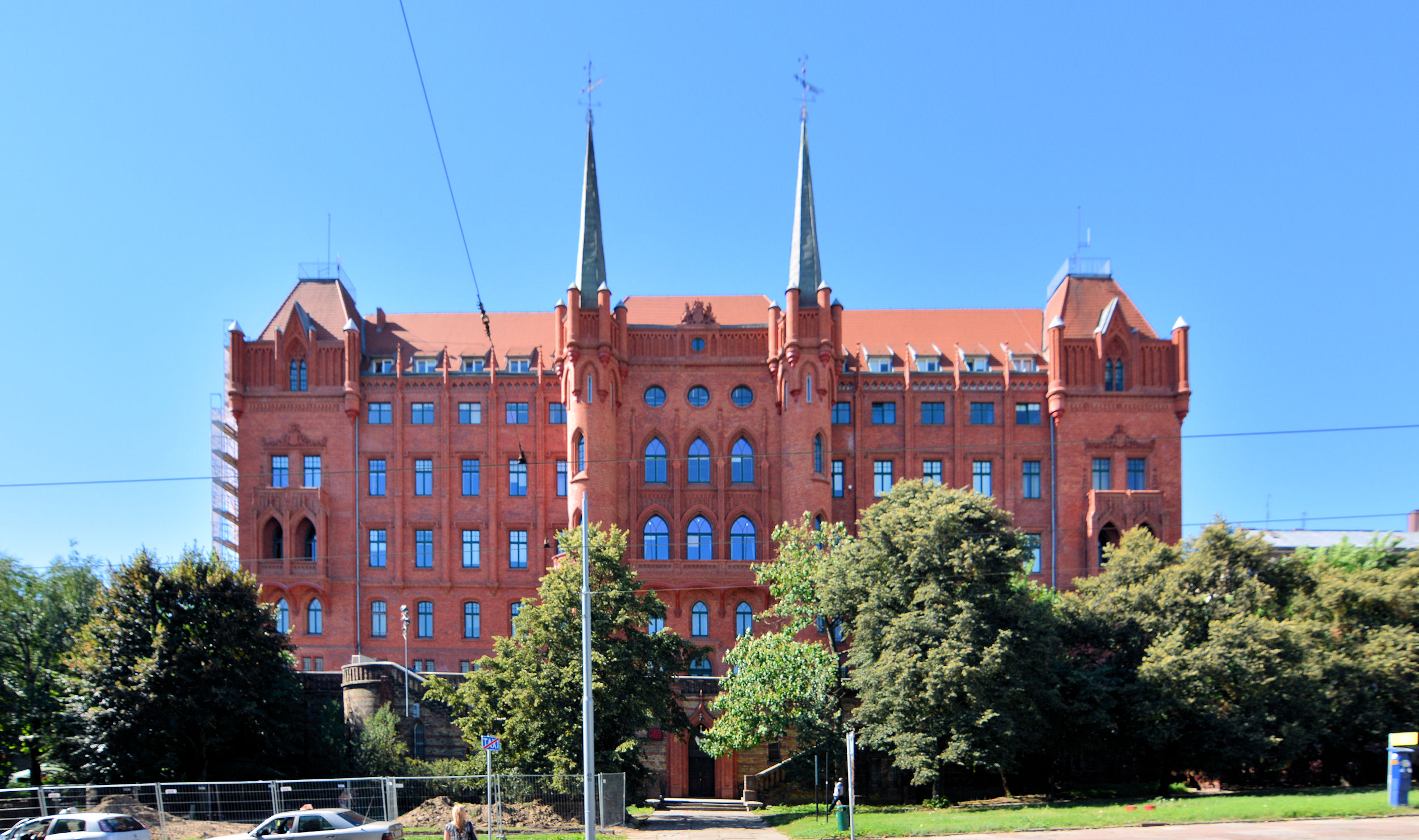
- The Red Town Hall, as seen from the Tobruk Square.
- Interactive map of the Red Town Hall area

General information
- Type: Town hall
- Architectural style: Gothic Revival
- Location: Szczecin, Poland, 4 Stephen Báthory Square
- Coordinates: 53°25′19.5″N 14°33′06.0″E
- Construction started: 2 September 1875
- Completed: 10 January 1879

Design and construction
- Architect: Konrad Kruhl

The Red Town Hall (Polish: Czerwony Ratusz; German: Rotes Rathaus), also known as the New Town Hall (Polish: Nowy Ratusz; German: Neues Rathaus), is a historic Gothic Revival town hall building in Szczecin, Poland. It is placed at 4 Stephen Báthory Square, within the New Town neighbourhood of the Downtown district. It was designed by Konrad Kruhl, and opened in 1897, as the seat of municipal government. It was burned down in 1945, and rebuilt in 1963, currently housing the local maritime administration.

== History ==
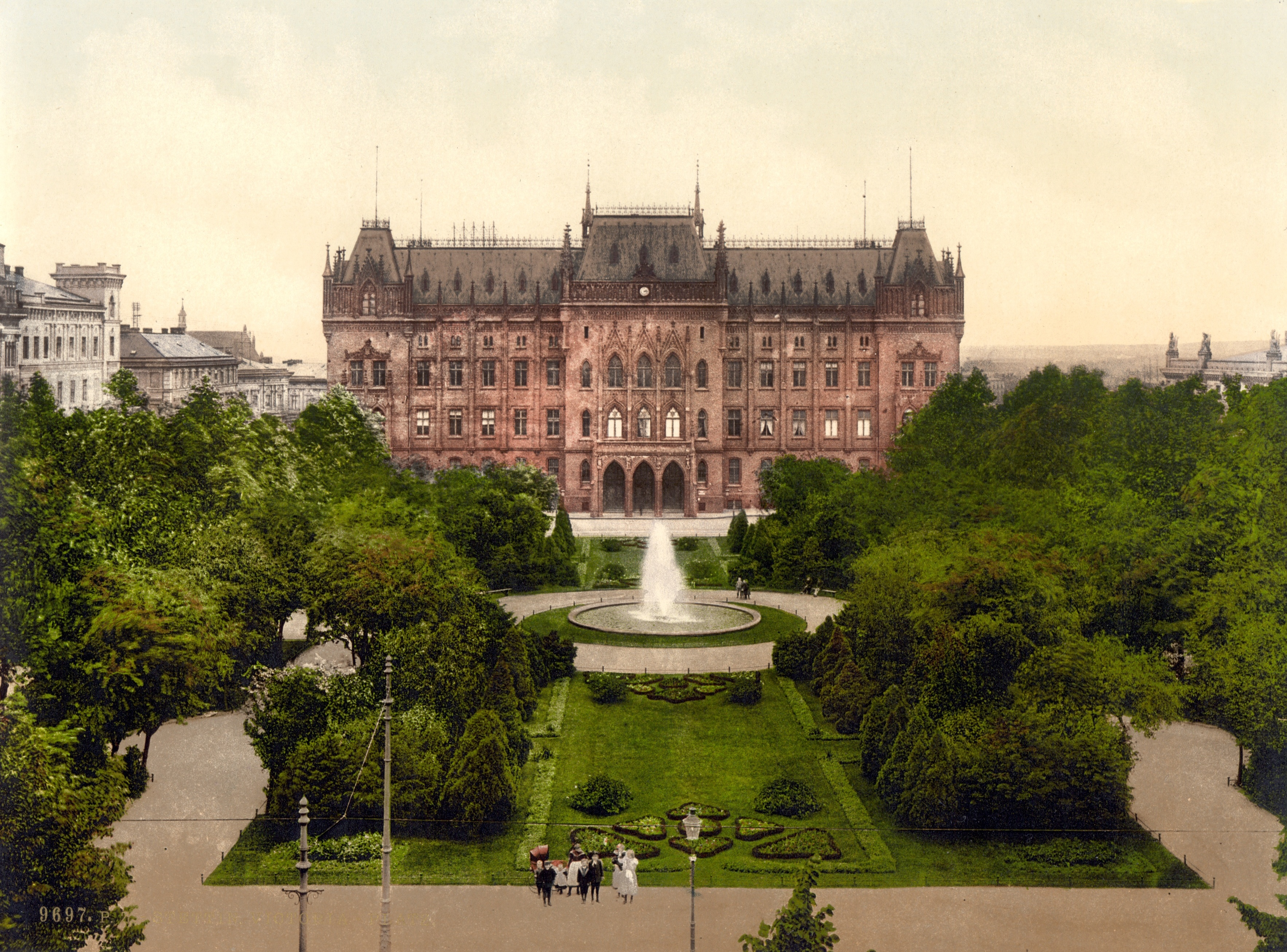
The building in 1900.

It was designed by Konrad Kruhl in the Gothic Revival style, as a new seat of the municipal government of Szczecin (then Stettin), after its old building, the Old Town Hall, was deemed inadequate in size for the contemporary needs. The construction began on 2 September 1875, and the building was opened on 10 January 1879. A Baroque relief sculpture of the city coat of arms, dating to 1661, was moved inside from the Old Town Hall.

In 1939, its attic was adopted into apartments, with its sharp pinnacles, decorating the outside lesenes, being replaced with small poles.

The building was minimally damaged in the aerial bombardment throughout the Second World War, and was destroyed by arson on 6 December 1945. The circumstances of the attack remain unclear.

Its ruins stood until 1956, and the town hall was rebuilt between 1959 and 1963. It was originally planned to house a part of the municipal government, however the building was given to the local maritime administration instead. It was renovated between 2008 and 2016. Currently, it houses the Szczecin Maritime Office, which administers the building, as well as a few other government institutions.

== Architecture ==
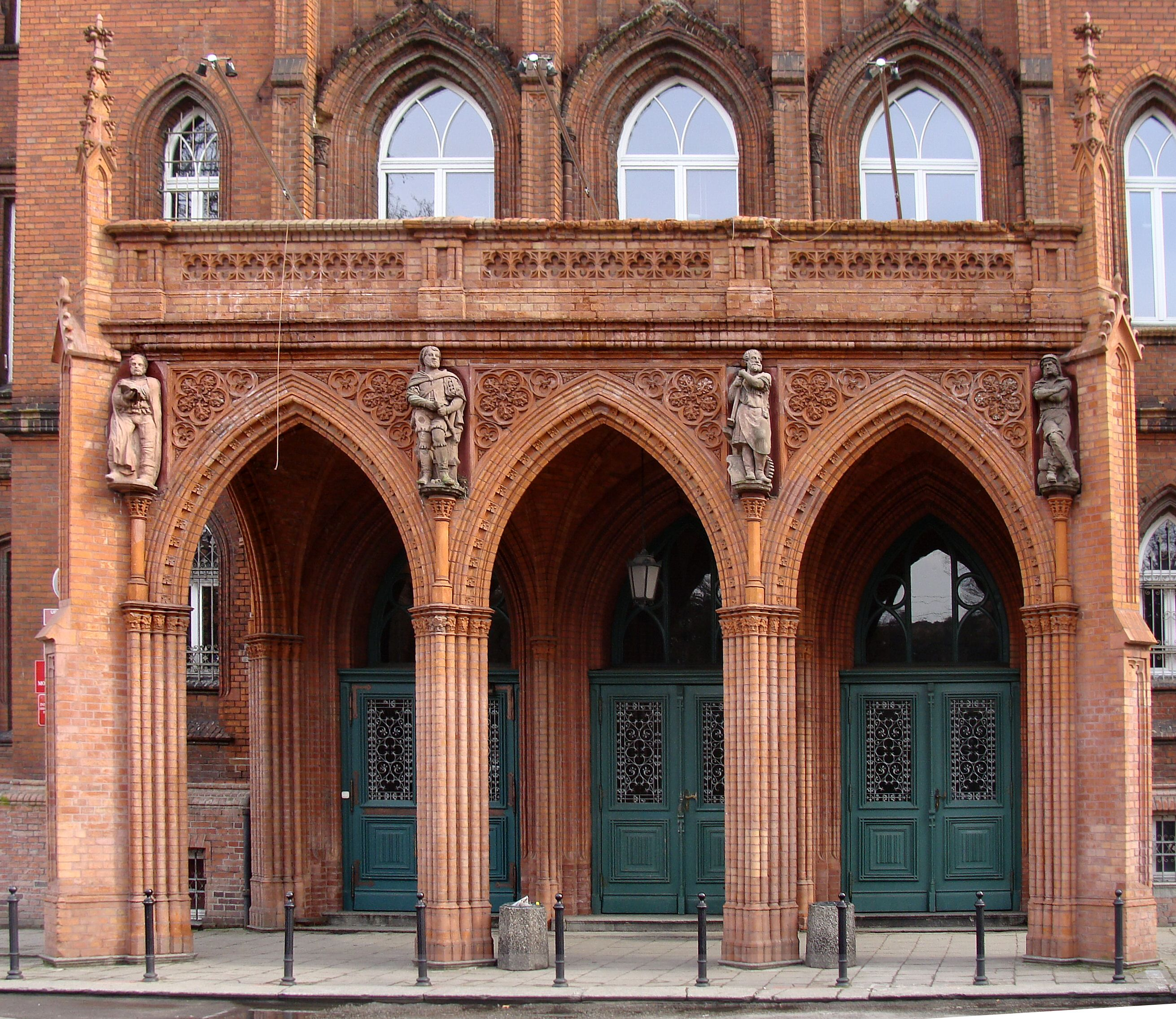
The western entrance.

The Gothic Revival building is made from red and, to lesser extent, green bricks, and has a rectangular base. It is placed on an escarpment, with Stephen Báthory to the west and the Tobruk Square to the east. Its western entrance features a tarrace with representative staircases, and arcades, with four ceramic statues installed above the pillers. Made in 1869 by Emil Steiner, each has the height of 120 m, and represents one of four city's traits: manufacturing industry, agriculture, maritime shipping, and education. The interior staricase is decorated with a Baroque relief from 1661, depicting the coat of arms of Szczecin, which was moved from the Old Town Hall.

The building has two avant-corps at its western corners. Its façade is richly ornamented, featuring balconies, towers, acanthuses around its windows. The top of west and east walls features cartouches, depicting the city coat of arms, surrounded by two lions, holding the crown of House of Vasa above it.

The main hall has the tall ceiling with rib vault, and featuring a skylight fron stained glass, as well as large paintings and iron chandeliers.

== Gallery ==
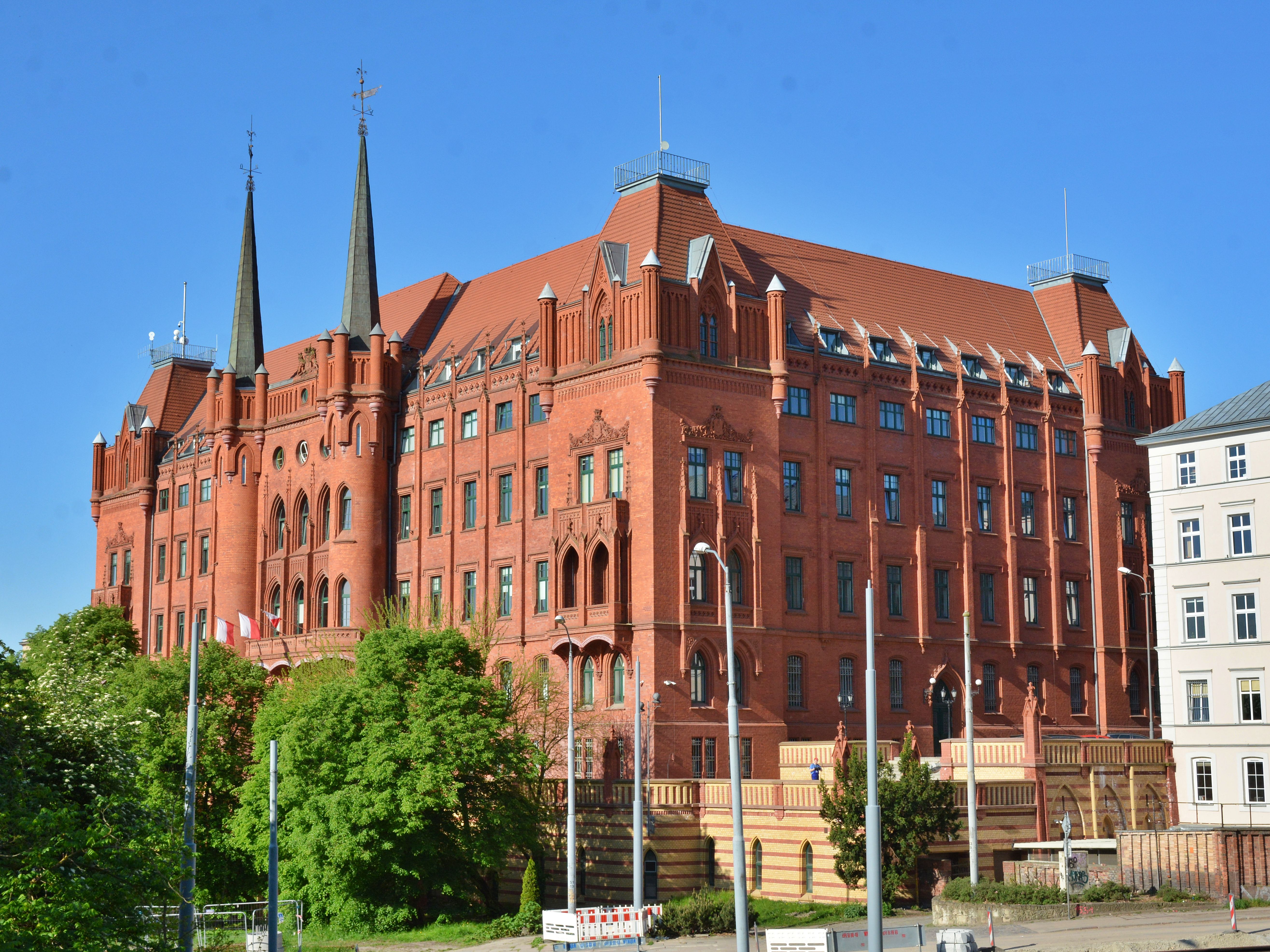
The building as seen from northwest.

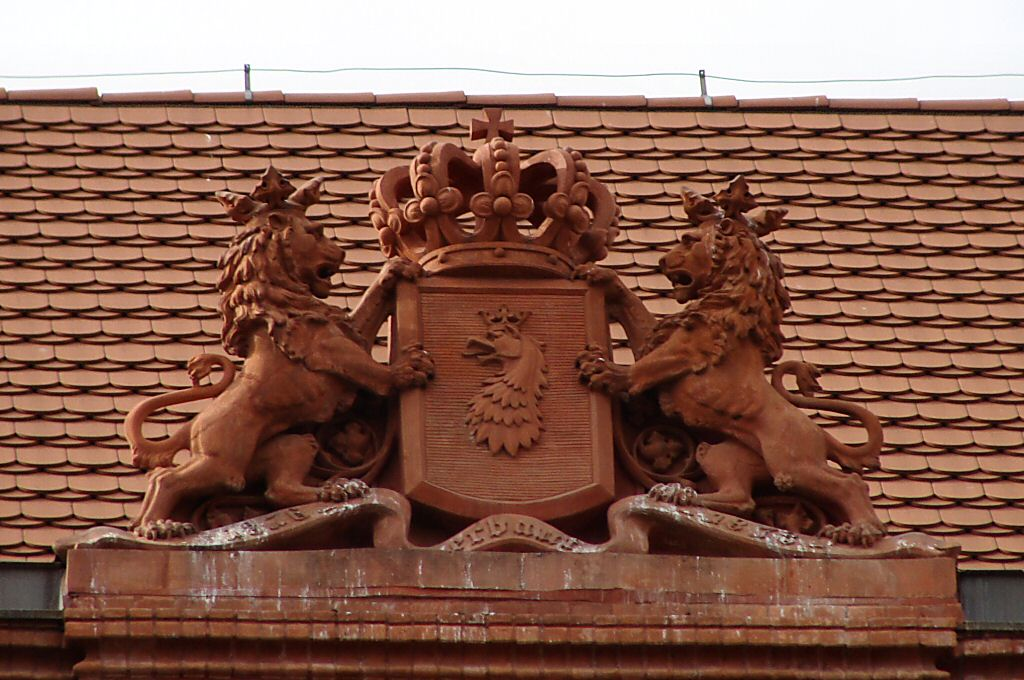
The coat of arms of Szczecin topping its left façade.
