= Flag of Szczecin =

Polish municipal flag

Szczecin
- Proportion: 1:2
- Adopted: 1695 (first known appearance); 2 December 1996 (current version)
- Design: Rectangle divided horizontally into 6 equal stripes of red and blue with the coat of arms of Szczecin on the left side

The flag is the symbol of the city of Szczecin in West Pomeranian Voivodeship, Poland.

== Design ==
This flag has a shape of a rectangle with 1:2 proportions, divided horizontally into 6 equal stripes of red and blue. Located on the left side of the flag is the coat of arms of Szczecin, a blue shield with golden (yellow) border, with the red head of a griffin with a golden (yellow) crown and beak.

== History ==
The hanseatic flag of Szczecin.

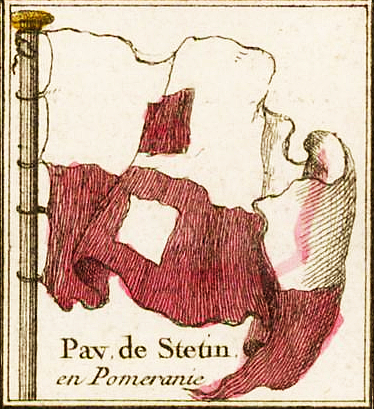
Flag of Szczecin from Jacques-Nicolas Bellin flag cart, presented among the important nautical flags of the 18th century.

During the Middle Ages, the city used a Hanseatic flag as a member of Hanseatic League. It was equally divided into 2 stripes, red on top and white in bottom, with the squares of the opposing colours located within each of the stripes. There were various versions of the flag, presenting it both in the shape of a vertical and horizontal rectangle, with inner squares or rectangles being either positioned in the center, or on the left side of the flag. It was based on the flag of Lübeck. According to most sources, its oldest known appearance was in 1695.

The flag of Stettin during the Prussian administration, used until 1945.

In 1720, the city was incorporated into the Kingdom of Prussia, which in 1918, was replaced by the Free State of Prussia. Under Prussian administration, the city begun using the rectangular flag with 6 alternating red and blue stripes. This design had been used until 1945. Following the end of World War II in 1945, there were various versions of the flag used by the city, having from 4 to 10 stripes, sometimes, with their order reverted, starting with the blue stripe on top.

In the 19th century, the city also used to have two maritime flags, used by the ships based in the city. Until 1869, it used a white rectangular flag. On the left side of the flag was located the coat of arms of the city, with the red head of griffin with golden (yellow) beak and crown, located in the silver (white) escutcheon with golden (yellow) coronet crown. On the right side was located black number 31. The second maritime flag used by Szczecin was a white rectangle with the black number 200 on the right side, and the coat of arms of the city located in the canton on the left side. The coat of arms was the red head of griffin with golden (yellow) beak and crown, located in the blue escutcheon with the crown on its top.

The current flag was established by the City Council of Szczecin on 2 December 1996 and later confirmed by the city by-law on 14 December 2004. The current flag has six alternating red and blue stripes, and the coat of arms of the city located on the left side of the flag.

== See also ==
- coat of arms of Szczecin
