= Old Town Hall (Szczecin) =

Historic town hall building in Szczecin, Poland

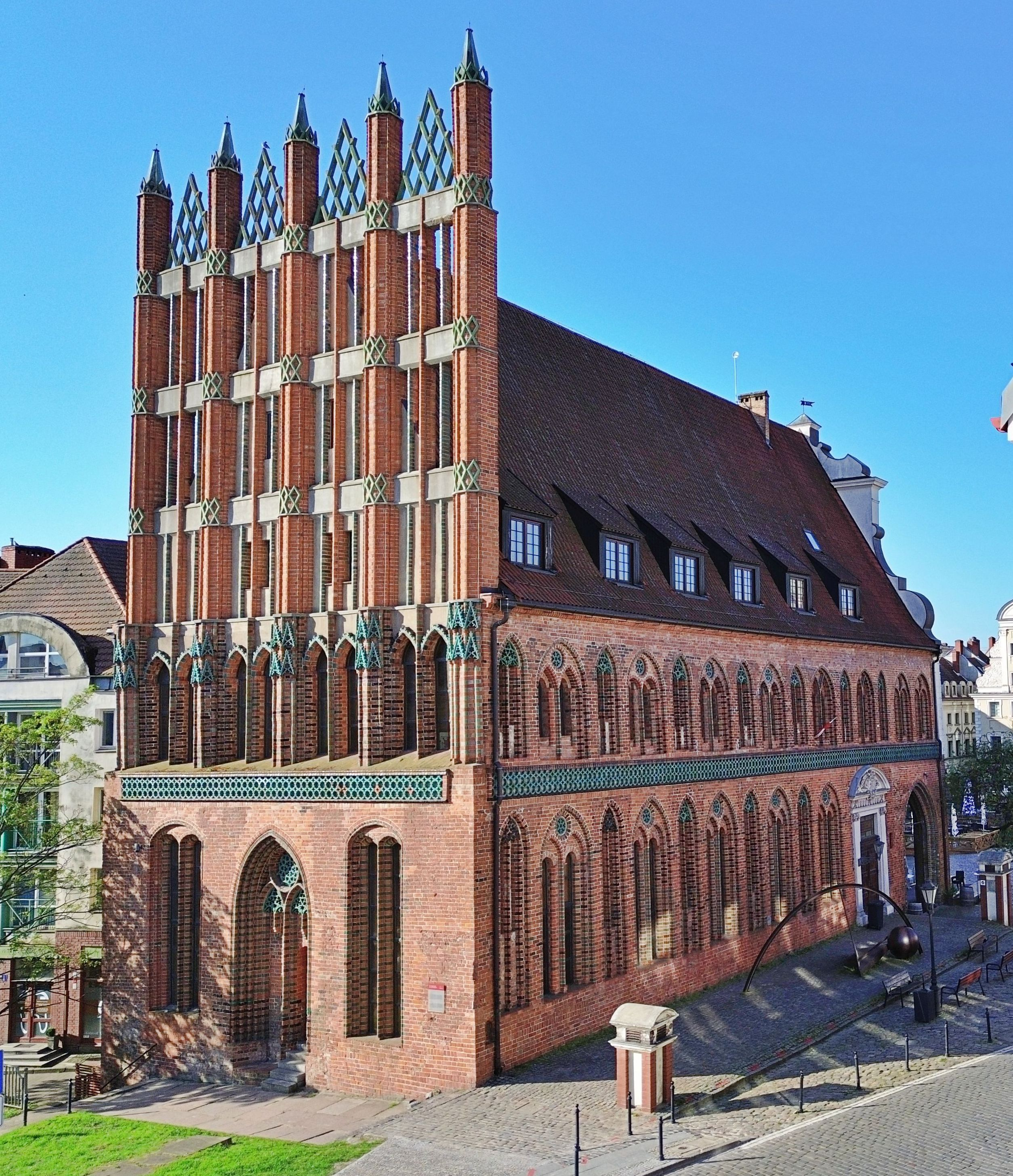
- The building as seen from the northwest.
- Interactive map of the Old Town Hall area

General information
- Type: Town hall
- Architectural style: Gothic; Baroque
- Location: Szczecin, Poland, 8 Księcia Mściwoja II Street
- Coordinates: 53°25′28″N 14°33′36″E
- Completed: 15th century

The Old Town Hall (Polish: Ratusz Staromiejski; German: Altes Rathaus; Altstädtische Rathaus) is a historic Gothic and Baroque town hall building in Szczecin, Poland. It is located at 8 Księcia Mściwoja II Street, next to the Hay Market Square and the New Market Square, within the Old Town neighbourhood of the Downtown district. The building was constructed in the 15th century and served as the seat of the municipal government until 1897. It was destroyed in 1944, and rebuilt in 1975. Currently it houses the Szczecin History Museum, a branch of the Szczecin National Museum.

== History ==
The Gothic town hall was erected in the 15th century at the corner of the Hay Market Square. It was built in place of a wooden building from the 13th century, which housed the city council, courtroom, trade hall, and a jail.

In 1570, from 5 to 13 December, the town hall housed the peace talks between Denmark and Sweden, which led to the signing of the Treaty of Stettin, ending the Northern Seven Years' War.

The building was heavily damaged in the sieges in 1659 and 1677, during the Northern War and Scanian War, and rebuilt afterwards, in the Baroque style.

It remained the seat of the municipal government until 1879, when it moved to the Red Town Hall. It was destroyed in 1944 during the aerial bombings during the Second World War.

It was rebuilt between 1972 and 1975, as the building of the Szczecin History Museum, a branch of the Szczecin National Museum. It was mostly restored in the Gothic style, with one side of its façade retaining the Baroque ornamentation.

== Architecture ==
The building mostly features Gothic ornamentation, except the façade of its west wall, with a Baroque design featuring a tall volute gable top with a tall arcade. The eastern wall includes an avant-corps with an openwork wall of pinnacles connected with entablatures. Its walls are made from glazed red and green bricks, and the façade features window arches, arcades, and cornices. Its basements and two rooms on upper floors have Gothic lierne vaults.

Currently, the building houses the Szczecin History Museum, a branch of the Szczecin National Museum. Its basement also features a restaurant. The building is part of the European Route of Brick Gothic.

== Gallery ==
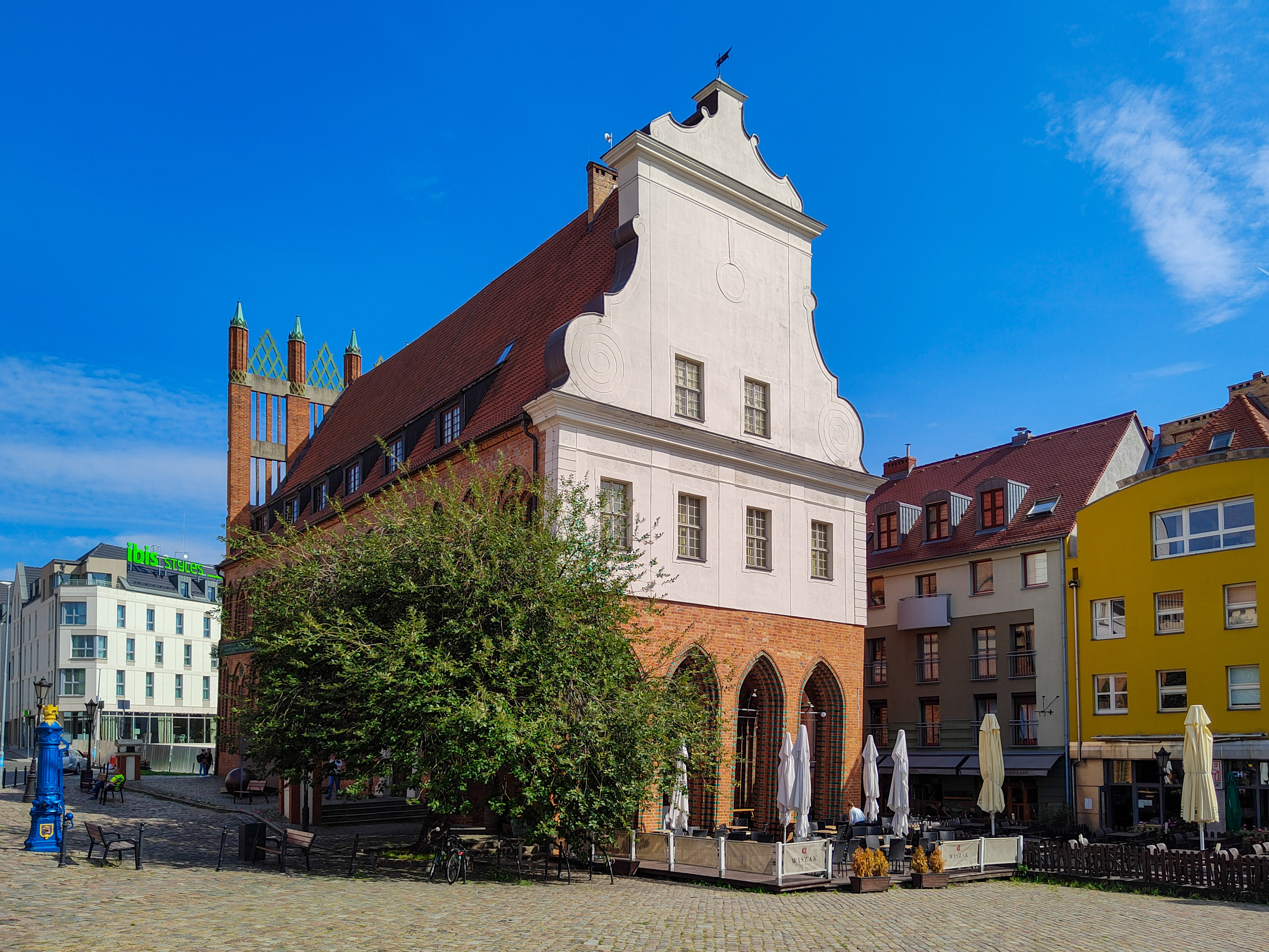
The building as seen from the southwest.

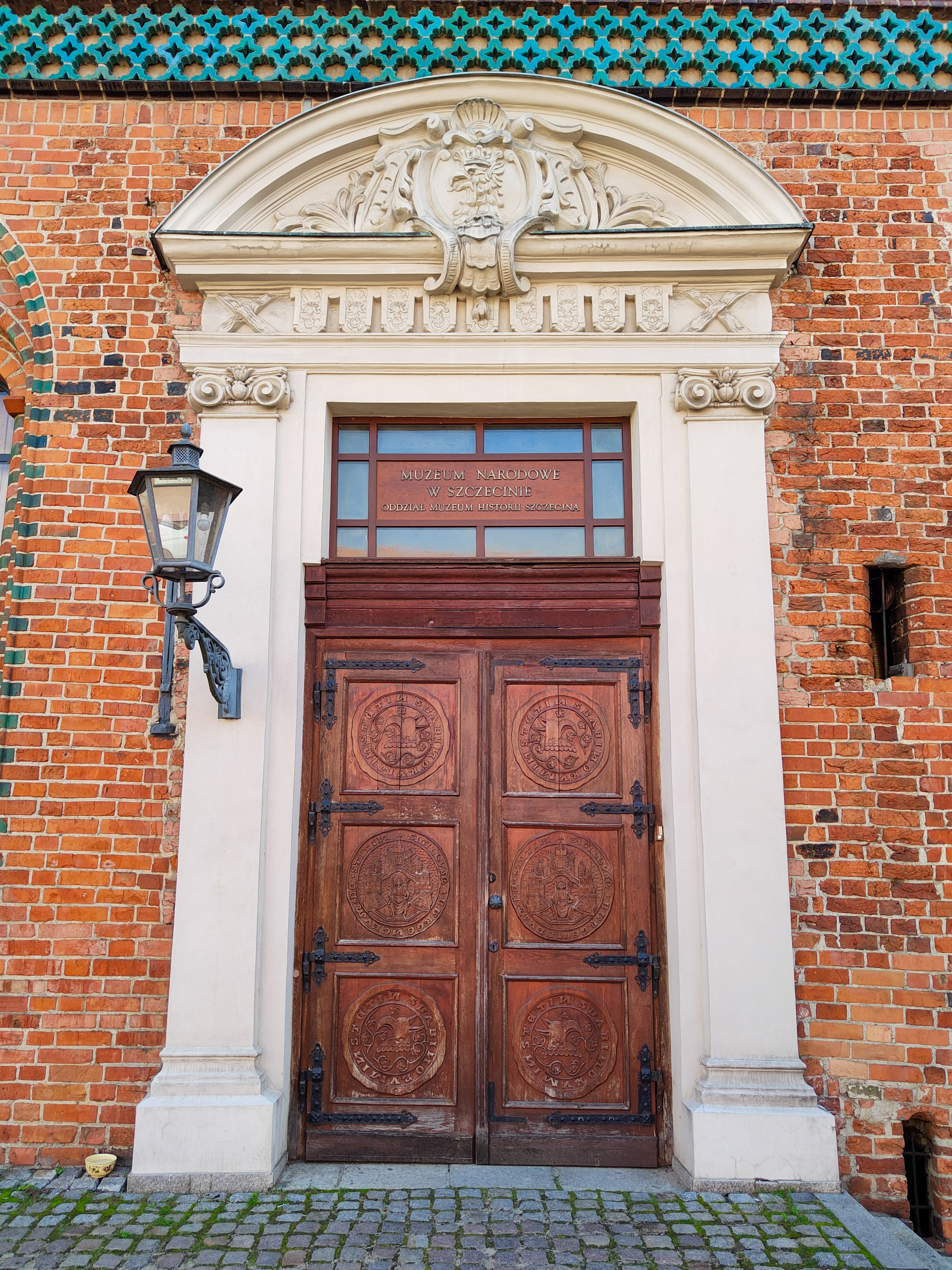
Baroque entrance at the north façade.

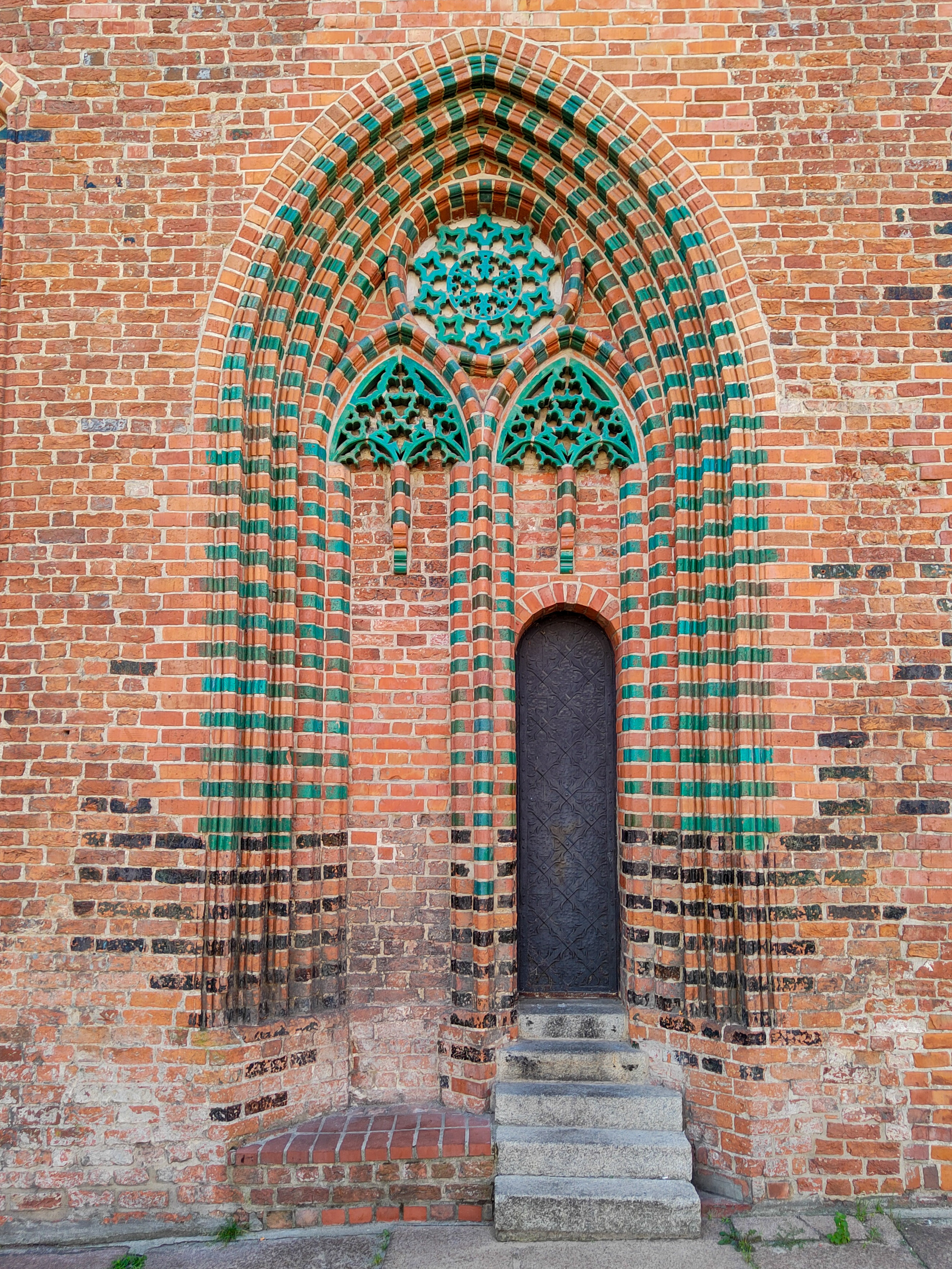
Gothic entrance at the north façade.

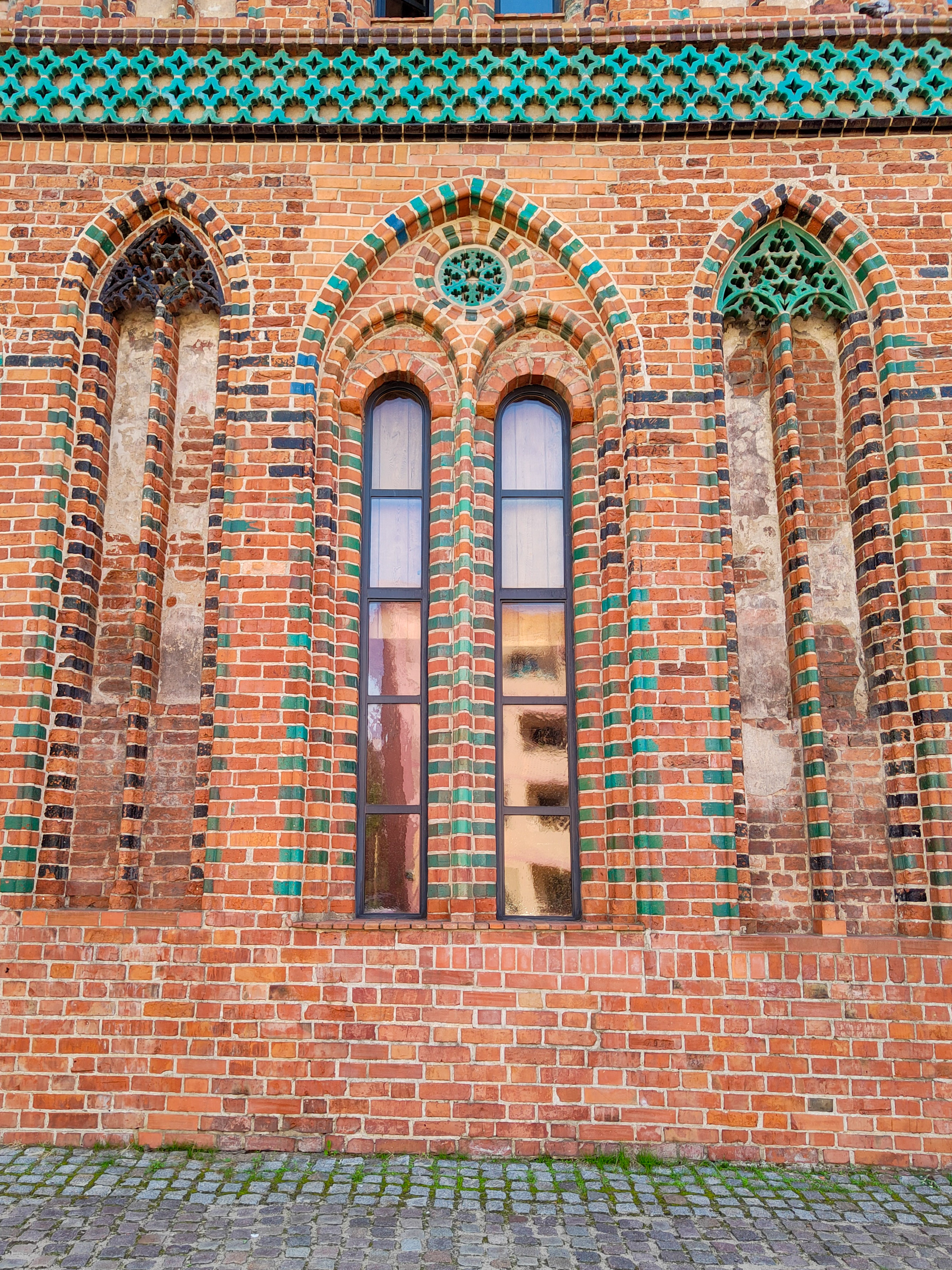
Gothic windows at the north façade.

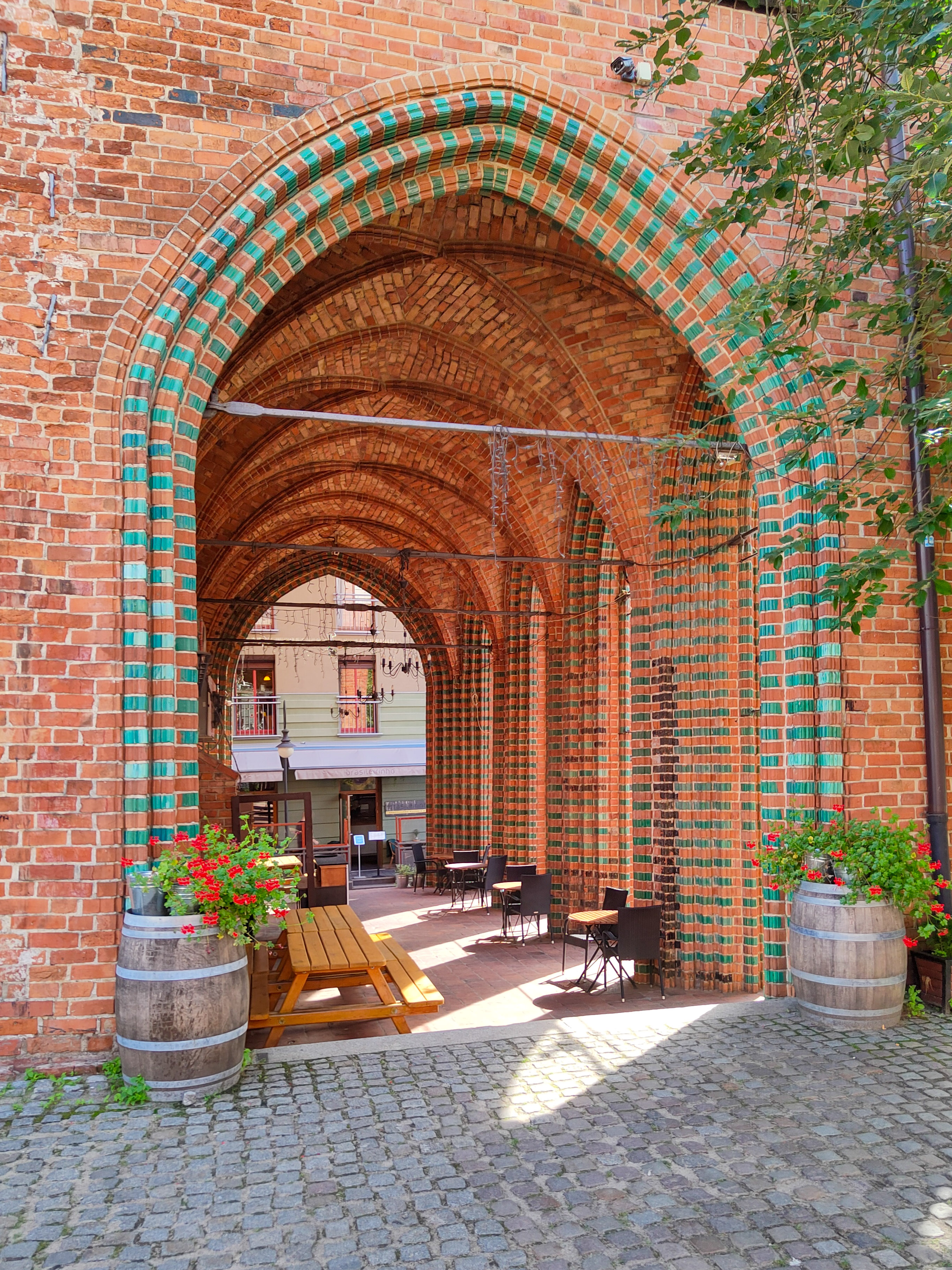
Arcades at the south façade.
