= Coat of arms of Szczecin =

Polish coat of arms

- Armiger: Szczecin
- Adopted: c. 1360 (first appearance); 2 December 1996 (current version)
- Shield: Blue Iberian style escutcheon
- Compartment: Red griffin head
- Use: Szczecin

The coat of arms that serves as the symbol of the city of Szczecin in West Pomeranian Voivodeship, Poland depicts the head of a red griffin with a yellow (golden) beak wearing a yellow (golden) crown, placed on the blue background.

== Design ==
The coat of arms is a blue Iberian style escutcheon (shield) with square top and rounded base. It has a head of a griffin with red feathers, a symbol of house of Griffin, a dynasty that ruled in Pomerania during the Medieval Ages. The crown and beak of the griffin are golden (yellow). The size proportion of the coat of arms height to width is 1:0.75 (4:3). The border of the escutcheon is a golden (yellow) stripe.

== History ==
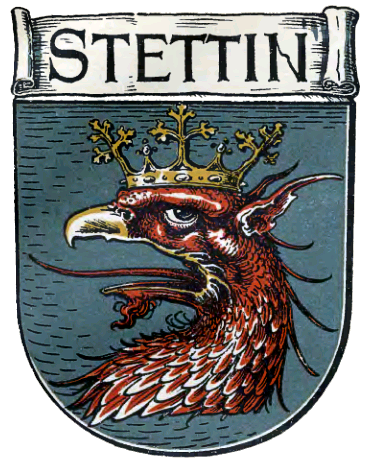
1898 depiction of the coat of arms of Szczecin by Otto Hupp.

The griffin, a mythical creature present in the coat of arms, had appeared for the first time in city's seals during the 8th century. The current design originated around 1360 while the period of the formation of escutcheon colour remains unknown. After 1660, Charles IX, king of Sweden, had added two lions holding it from both sides. It's unknown when the city went back to the previous design.

From after 1321 until 1994, the nearby town of Police, used the design of the coat of arms of Szczecin, as its own coat of arms.

The current coat of arms was established by the City Council of Szczecin on 2 December 1996 and later confirmed by the city by-law on 14 December 2004.

== Usage in the flags and emblems ==
The coat of arms is present in the current flag of Szczecin. It is also used in the emblem of the Multinational Corps Northeast of NATO, as well as in the emblems of the 12th Mechanised Division and the 5th Sapper Brigade of the Polish Armed Forces.

== Gallery ==
Coat of arms in the flag of Szczecin.

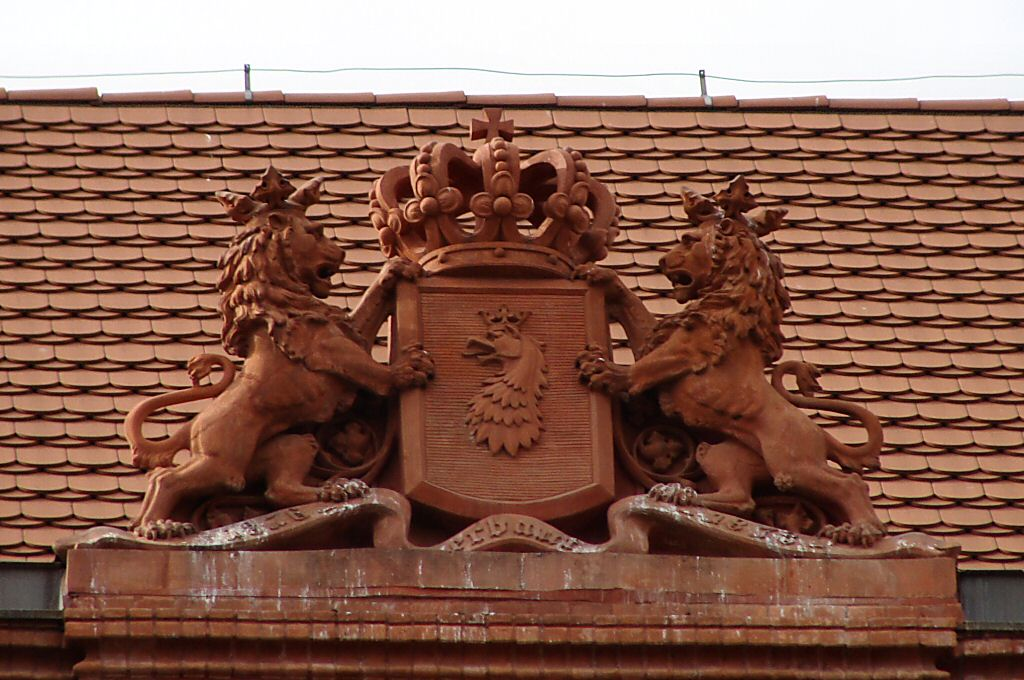
The version of the coat of arms with the lions on its sides, at the Red City Hall, Szczecin.

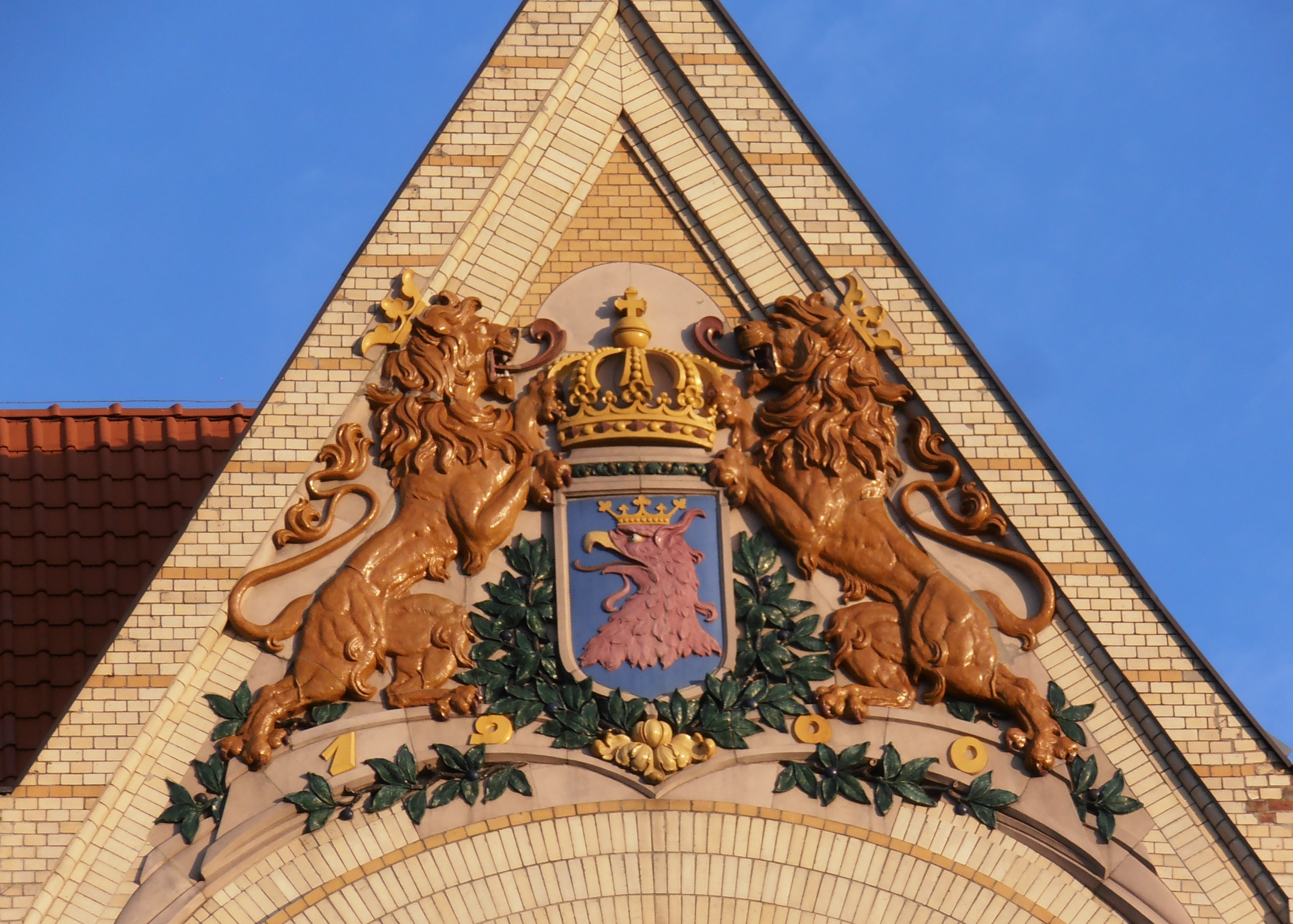
Version of coat of arms with the lions on its sides at the Faculty of Electrical Engineering of the West Pomeranian University of Technology, Szczecin.

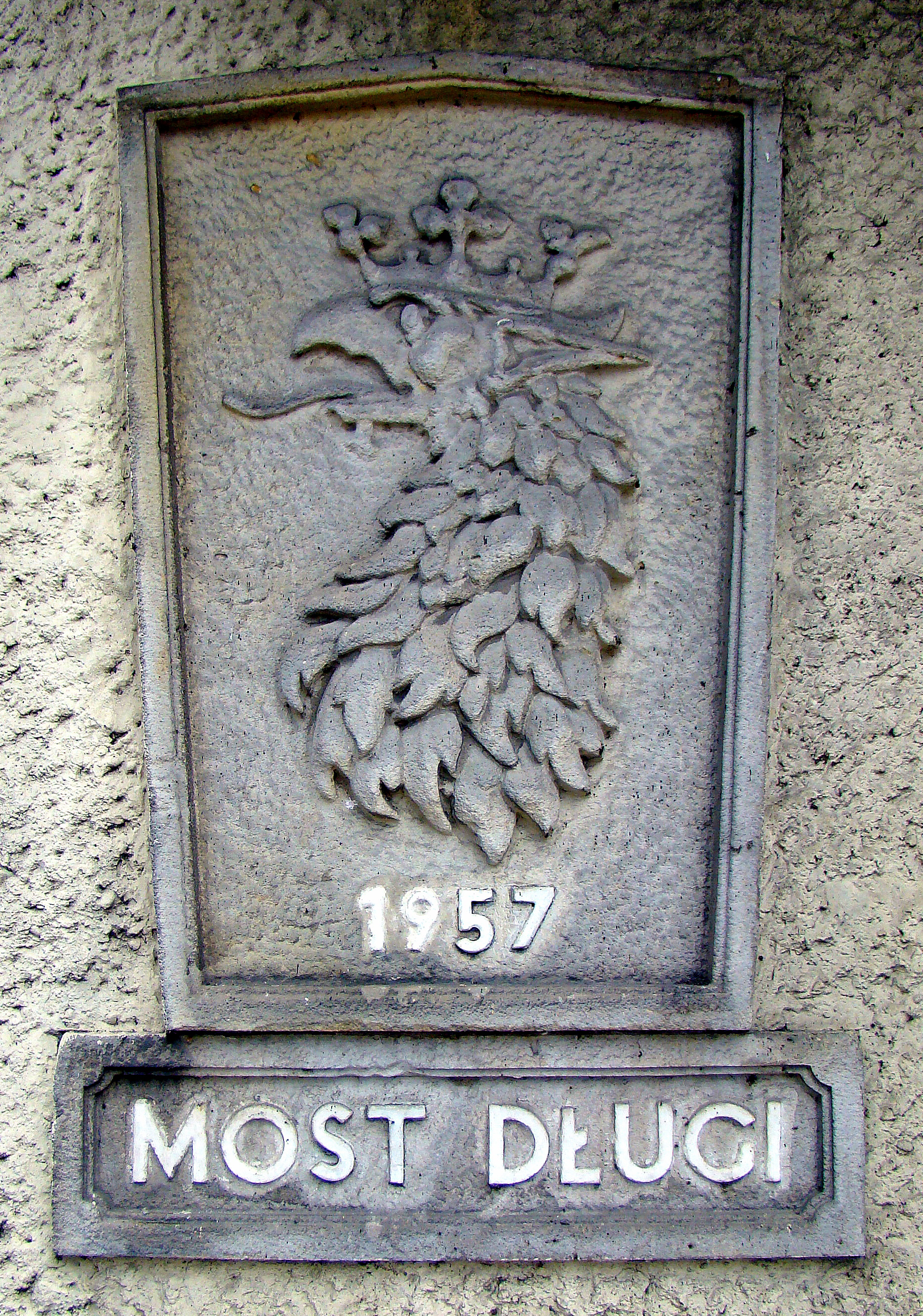
Coat of arms near the Long Bridge, Szczecin.

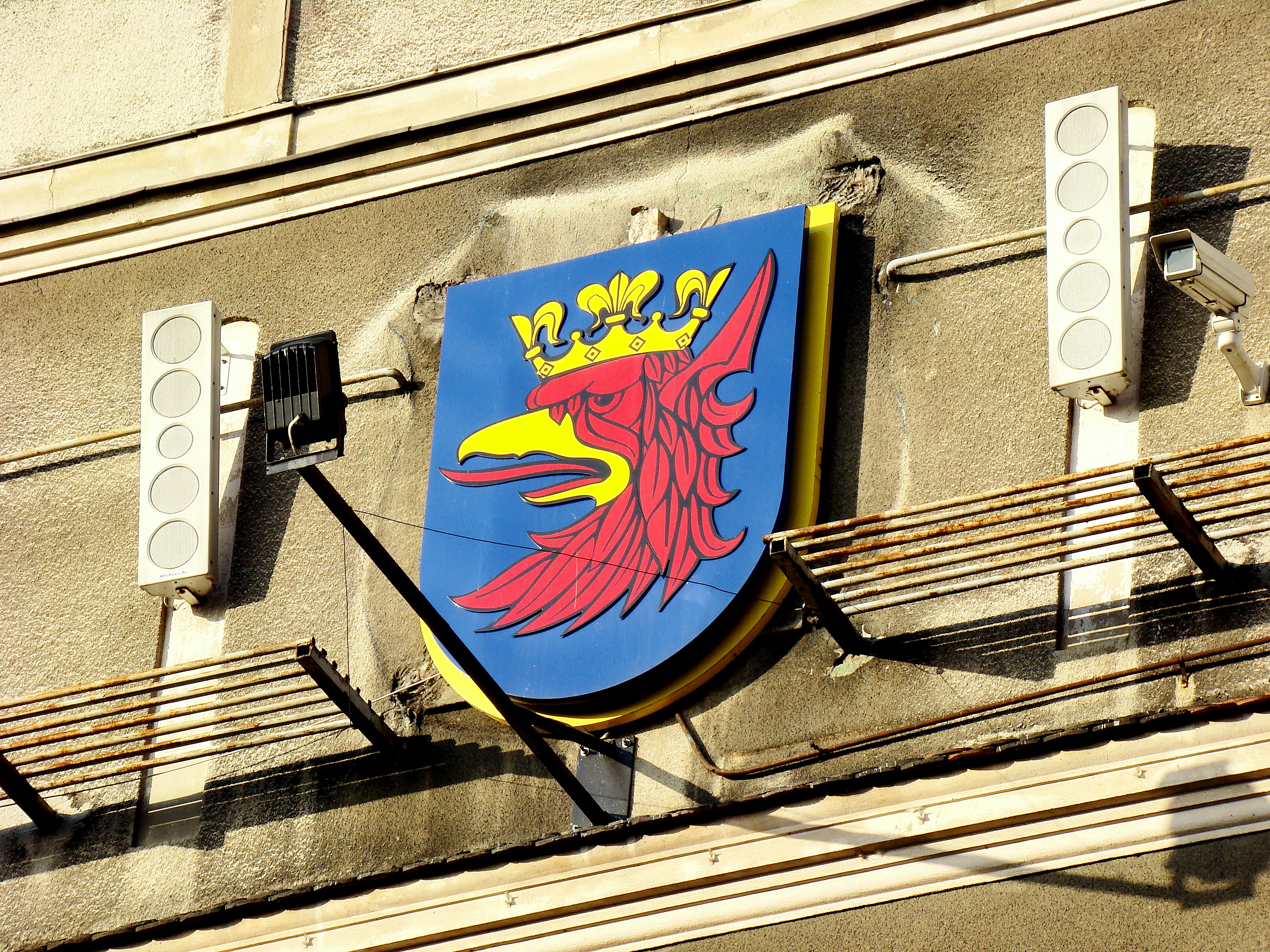
Coat of arms at the Szczecin City Hall in 2009.

Szczecin griffin used in the emblem of Multinational Corps Northeast.

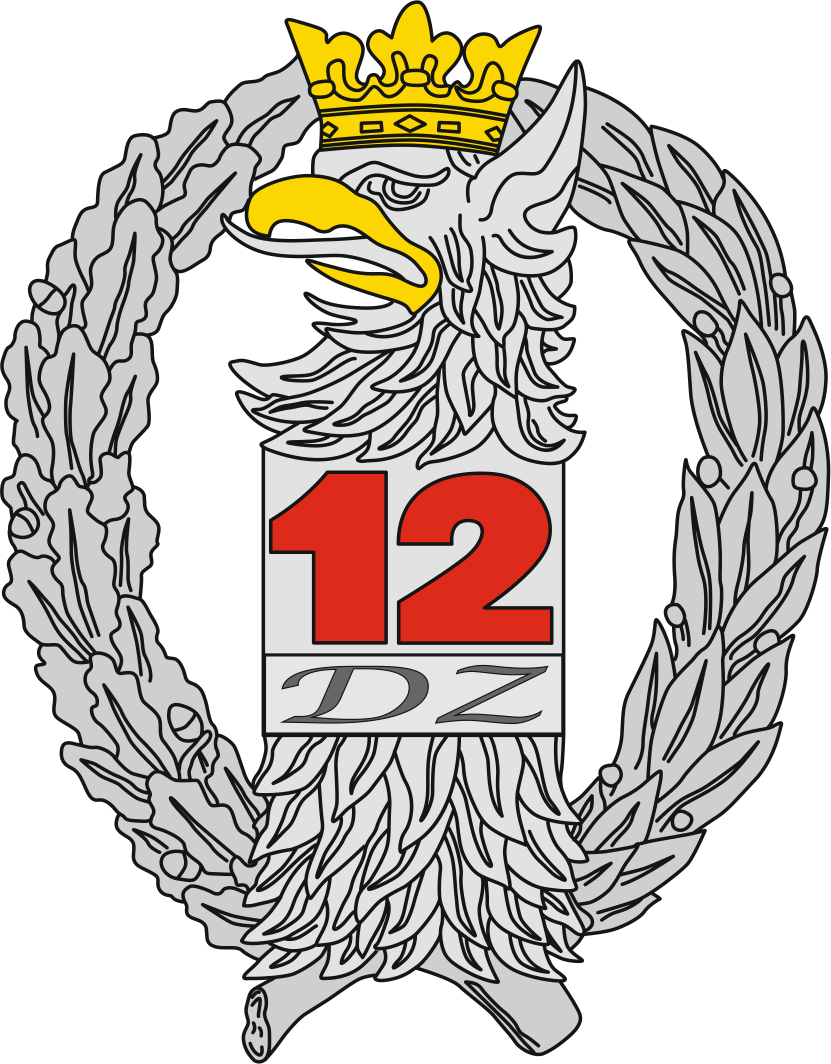
Szczecin griffin used in the emblem of 12th Mechanised Division.

== See also ==
- flag of Szczecin
- coat of arms of Police
