= Transverse leaf spring front suspension =

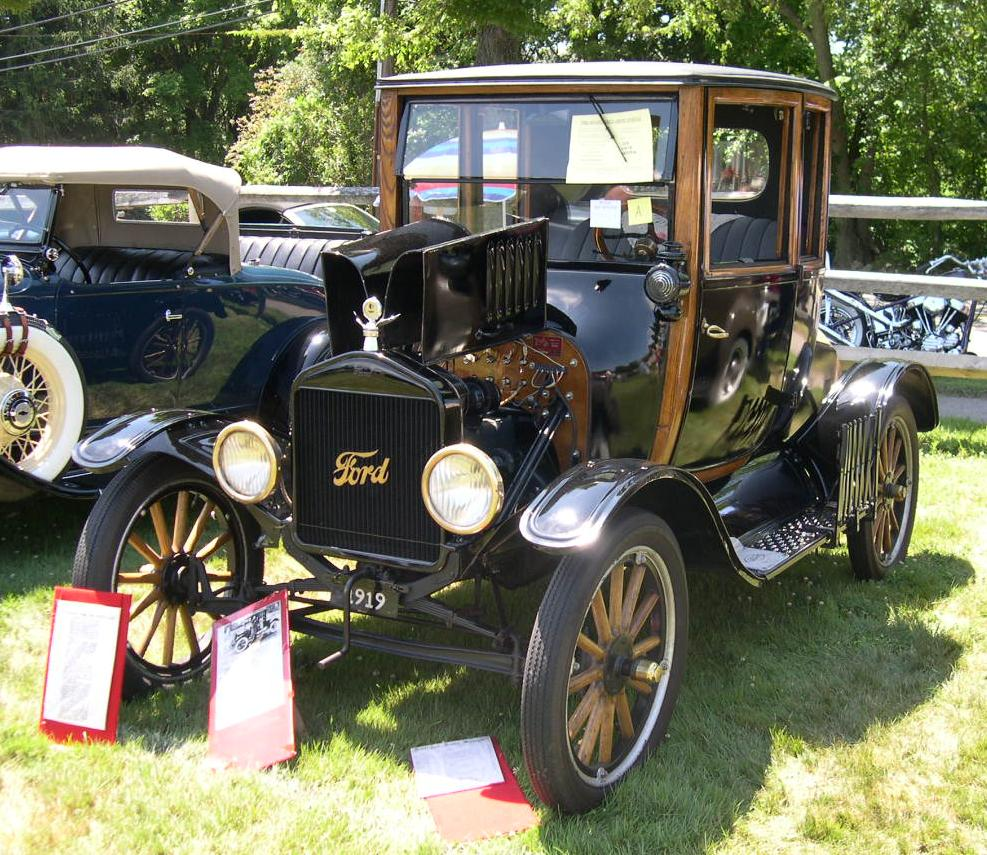
1919 Ford Model T

Transverse leaf spring front suspension is a type of automotive front suspension, whose usage is most well known in Ford Motor Company products from 1908 to 1948 (1959 for the inexpensive Ford Popular in the UK). "Suicide front axle" is a term that has been used for it.

The configuration consists of a one-piece axle (solid front axle), to the ends of which the steerable front wheels are mounted. The axle receives its vertical and transverse support from a transverse leaf spring (leaf springs were often used for support in more than one direction), and its longitudinal support from fore-aft links sometimes called "radius rods" which are attached (via pivots) to the ends of the axle at their forward end and to the sides of the chassis (again via pivots) at their aft end. The ends of the transverse leaf spring can either tie to the top of the rods, or to the top of the solid axle. The transverse leaf spring is attached at its center to the center of the chassis's front cross member.

== Advantages and disadvantages ==
In addition to simplicity, lightness and compact shape, at least in some directions, since only the small end of the spring was attached to the axle near the wheel, it gave low unsprung weight. In addition to its contribution to ride and handling, this reduced wheel bearing loads and therefore allowed smaller, cheaper bearings. Similarly, the use of one leaf spring pack for both wheels improved reliability on rough roads over competing designs that required a spring for each front wheel. In the event of a coil spring breaking the failure is total, whereas with a transverse leaf spring pack only one leaf tends to fail at one time (usually at the center mounting point), the pack clamps allowing the rest of the leaves to hold the car upright until the leaf can be replaced.

The control of wheel motion was inferior to that of other suspension designs, even those of the first half of the 20th century. This was not helped by the use of the leaf spring to provide lateral location for the axle by connecting it to both ends of the spring by almost horizontal shackles, which resulted in somewhat peculiar lateral movement, with quite significant bump-steer. Vertical shackles, as on a more typical fore and aft leaf spring, would have failed to provide lateral control. Some variants used a plain pivot at one end of the axle and a near-vertical shackle at the other. The wheel hub assemblies (sometimes known as steering knuckles) carry steering arms, the ends of which are linked by a tie or track rod. This is adjustable to set the toe angle correctly, and this will remain correct despite suspension movement. The problem then was that the drag link, conveying steering motion from the steering box to one steering arm, is approximately the same length as the spring. Because the spring changes its radius of curvature as it is deflected, the movement of one end would approximate that of a pivoted lever of lesser length than half of the spring, so whether the pivoted end was at the same side of the vehicle as the steering box, or otherwise, the drag link was always moving through a different arc to that of the axle ends and hub, causing bump steer, and noticeable difference in steering characteristics between turns to the left or to the right.

The modern Corvette leaf spring design does not use the spring for location.
