= Stoewer 3 S 17 =

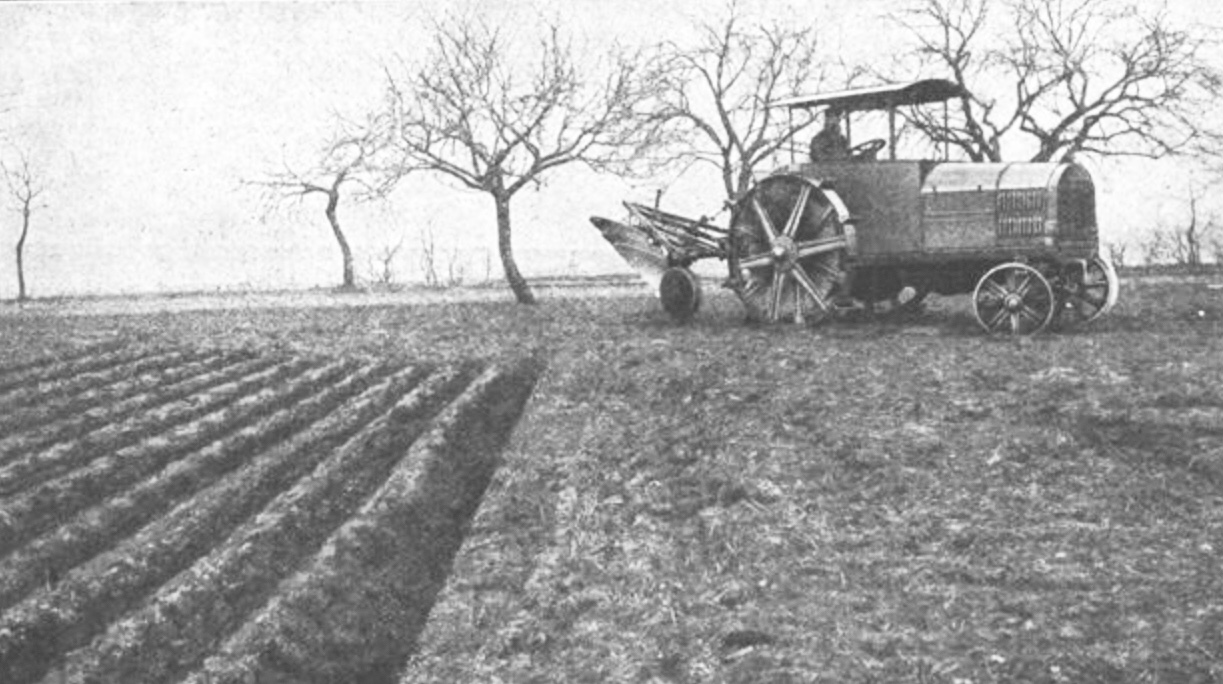

Overview
- Type: Agricultural tractor
- Manufacturer: Stoewer
- Production: 1919–1926

Powertrain
- Engine: 7363 cc four stroke straight-4
- Transmission: 3-speed manual

Stoewer 3 S 17 tractor was manufactured by Stoewer from 1919 to 1926. It was the first tractor manufactured by Stoewer.

== About ==
The tractor had a 7.3-liter inline 4-cylinder internal combustion engine with a power output of 38 horsepower (28 kW) at a low 800 revolutions per minute and was equipped with a three-speed transmission. The displacement of 7363 cc of the four-cylinder engine was achieved with a bore of 125 mm and a stroke of 150 mm. The maximum speed in the individual gears was 2 km/h in first gear, 4 km/h in second gear, and 6 km/h in third gear. The engine can be started in the correct ignition position using a starter magnet or by a manual starting crank. Gasoline, heavy gasoline, or benzene can be considered as fuel. Filters and the full encapsulation of the engine are supposed to help against dust. The rear wheels are driven by the rear axle differential via a shaft with a pinion through an internal gearing of the rear wheels. A three-bottom and a four-bottom plow are offered by the Stoewer factory. The working widths are 1000 mm and 1330 mm with a working depth of up to 12 inches. The tractor can pull a trailer with a payload of 16000 kg up a slope of 15% in third gear at 6 km/h.
