= Stoewer Motorwagen 6,5 HP =

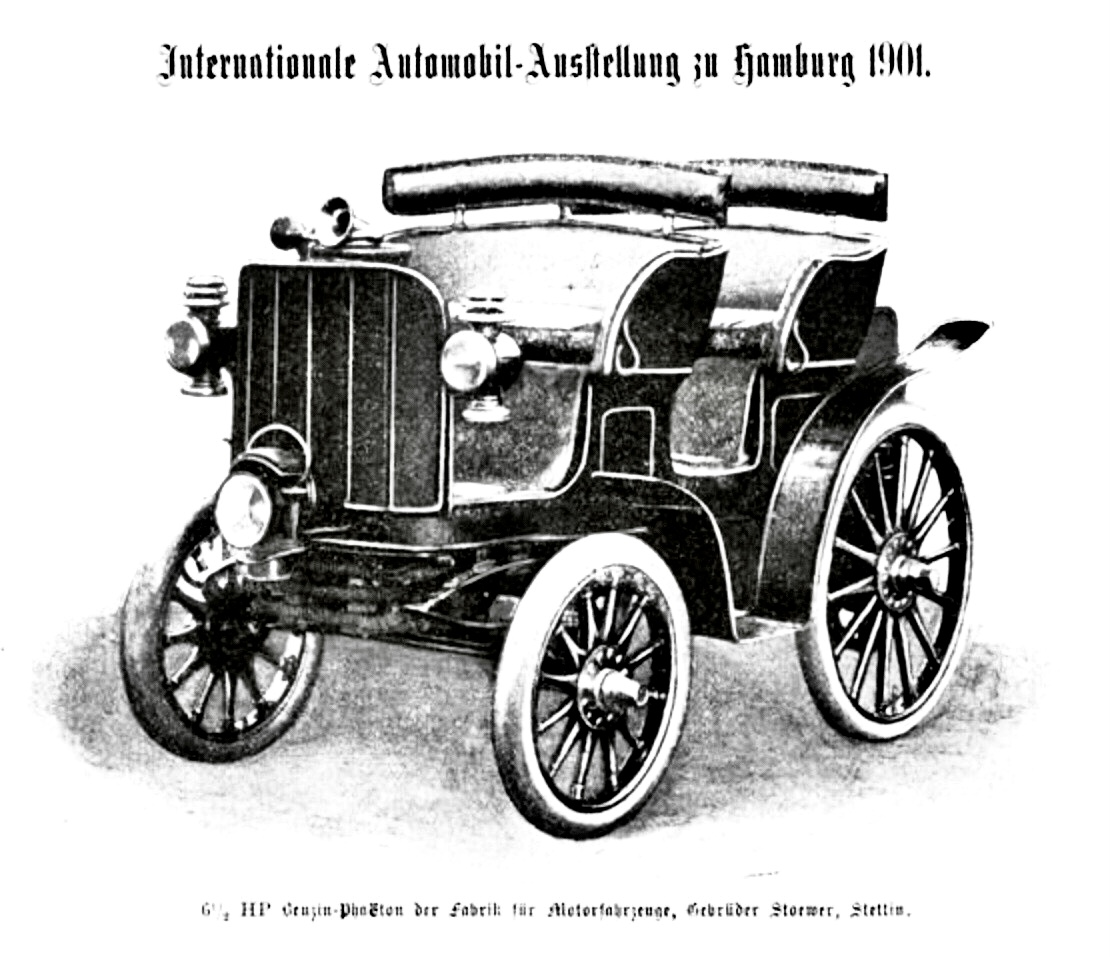
- Illustration depicting the Stoewer Motorwagen 6,5 HP as a Phaeton

Overview
- Manufacturer: Stoewer
- Production: 1899–1902
- Assembly: Stettin, Germany (now Szczecin, Poland)

Body and chassis
- Class: Car

Powertrain
- Engine: 2.1-litre I2

Chronology
- Predecessor: Stoewer single-cylinder motor car
- Successor: Stoewer 10 PS

Stoewer Motorwagen 6,5 HP was a convertible car manufactured in Stettin, Germany (now Szczecin, Poland) by Stoewer automotive company between 1899 and 1902. It had a 2.1-litre internal combustion engine.

== Specifications ==
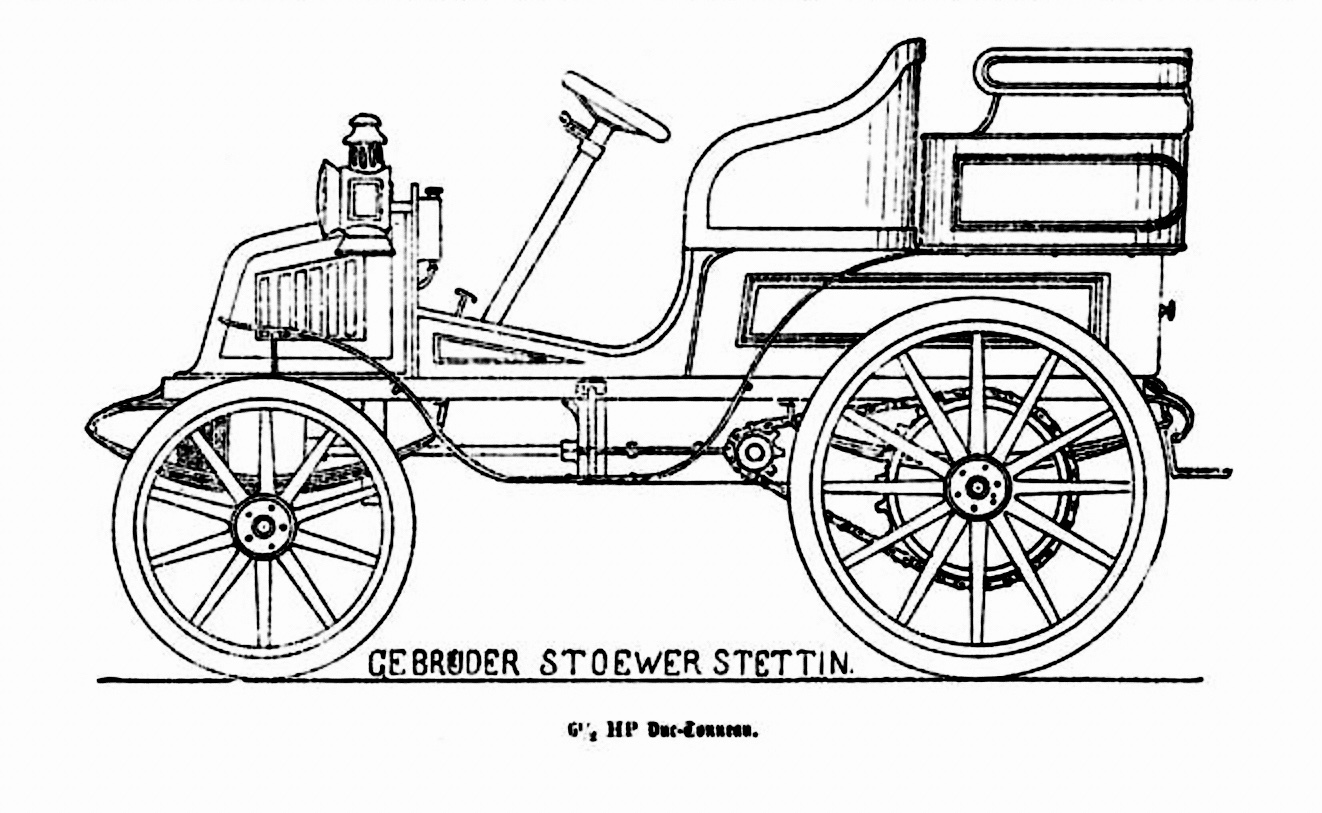
Stoewer Motorwagen 6,5 HP Duc-Tonneau (1899-1902).

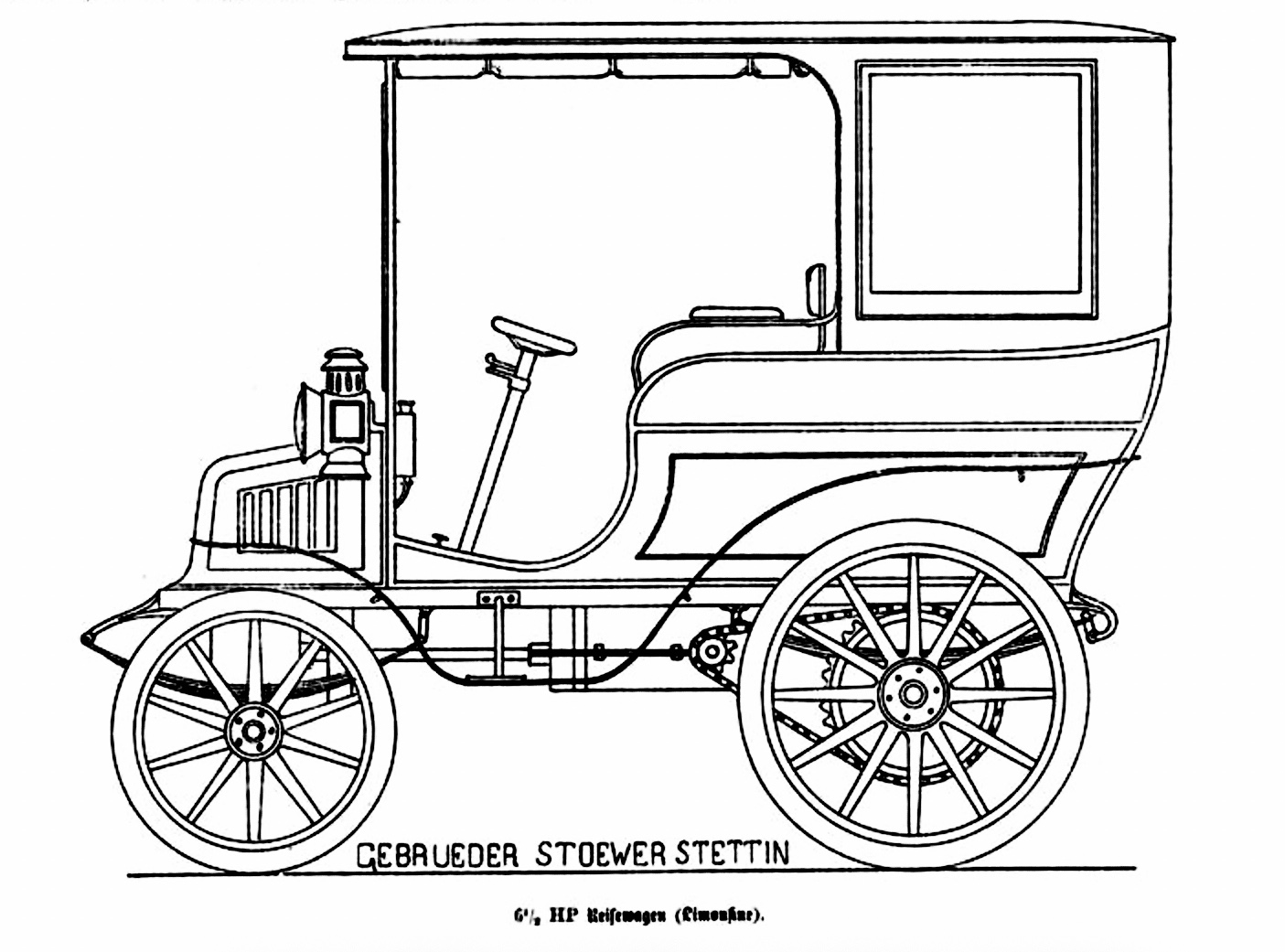
Stoewer Motorwagen 6,5 HP Limousine (1899-1902).

The car was a multi-seater convertible with a 2.1-liter inline two-cylinder engine with a power output of 6.5 PS (4.8 kW). It had a manual transmission where the gears were already engaged. The Stoewer 6,5 HP motor car was presented at the international motor show in Hamburg in 1901. At the fair, a Duc Tonneau, a limousine, and a Phaeton were presented. In front of the exhibition grounds, a 6,5 HP from the year 1899 was presented, which had covered the route from Stettin to Hamburg on its own wheels in 15 hours. In the year 1900, the same vehicle already traveled the route from Stettin to Paris. In addition to the vehicles with two-cylinder internal combustion engines, electric vehicles from the company Stoewer were also showcased. The six electric vehicles were introduced by the engineer and manager of the electrical department, W. Zimmermann. The range of the vehicles with batteries was between 60 and 90 km.
