= Stoewer R 140 =

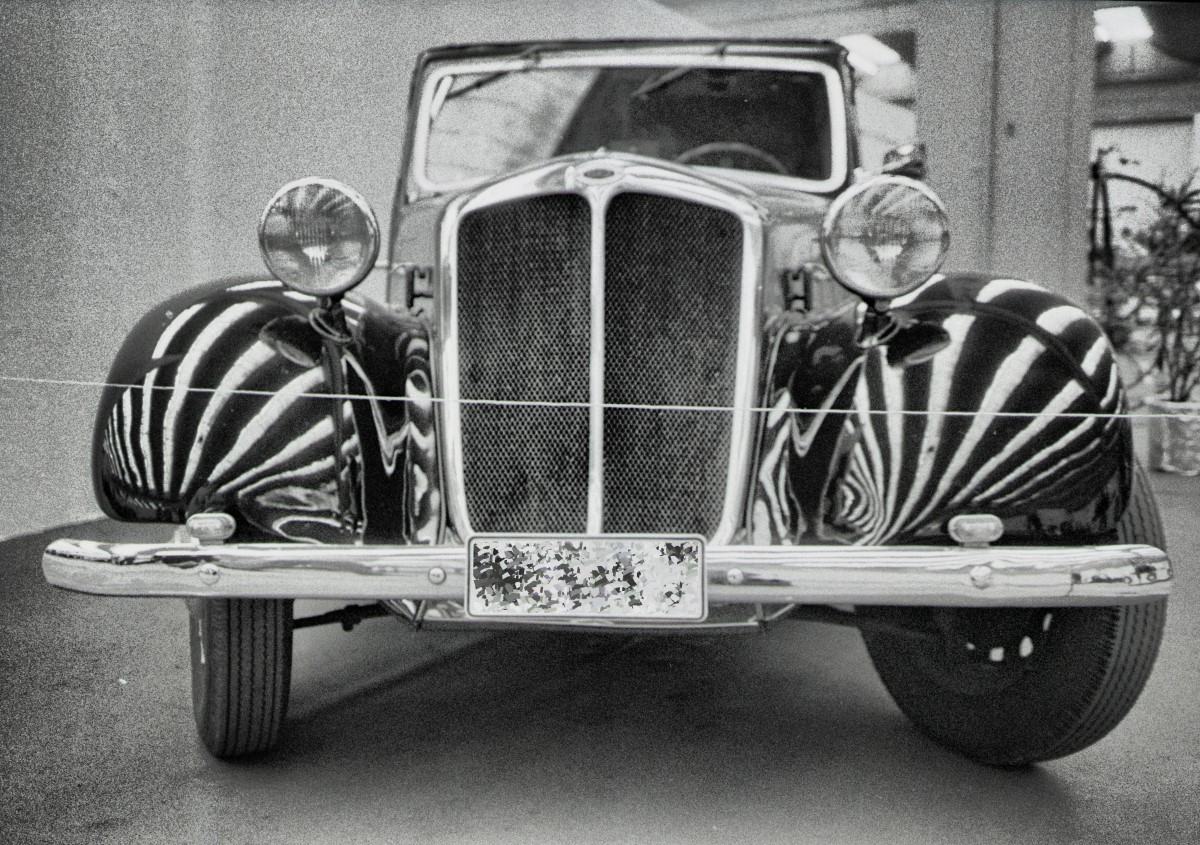
- Stoewer R150

Overview
- Manufacturer: Stoewer
- Also called: Stoewer R 150; Stoewer R 180
- Production: 1932–1935
- Assembly: Stettin, Germany (now Szczecin, Poland)

Body and chassis
- Class: Small car
- Body style: 2/4-door saloon; 2-door convertible; 2-door roadster
- Layout: Front-engine, front-wheel-drive

Powertrain
- Engine: 1.4 L SV I4; 1.5 L SV I4; 1.8 L SV I4
- Transmission: 3-speed manual

Dimensions
- Wheelbase: Roadster: 2,500 mm (98.4 in); R140/150: 2,750 mm (108.3 in); R180: 2,847 mm (112.1 in)
- Length: Roadster: 3,700 mm (145.7 in); R140/150: 3,900 mm (153.5 in); R180: 4,000 mm (157.5 in)
- Width: 1,540–1,565 mm (60.6–61.6 in)
- Height: 1,400–1,670 mm (55.1–65.7 in)
- Kerb weight: 950–1,200 kg (2,094–2,646 lb)

Chronology
- Predecessor: Stoewer V 5
- Successor: Stoewer Greif Junior

The Stoewer R 140 is a small car manufactured by Stoewer automotive company between 1932 and 1935; the name was changed to R 150 in 1934 and R 180 for the last year of production, to reflect larger engines being fitted. It has front-wheel drive, continuing the layout from the earlier V 5, albeit with a more traditional, inline engine as the predecessor's V4 had met with buyer resistance. The R 140 roadster retained the V 5's wheelbase but the chassis of the sedan and cabriolet (convertible) gained 25 cm (10 in). While a developmental dead end, the R-series cars helped keep Stoewer afloat during the Depression years.

== History ==
The Stoewer R 140 replaced the earlier V 5. It was manufactured in Stettin, Germany (now Szczecin, Poland) by Stoewer automotive company. About 1100 cars of the initial design were made in 1932 and 1933. During 1933, the engine was enlarged to 1.5 litres (maximum power was unchanged, as was the "R 140" name) and the saloon switched to a four-door layout; 1210 examples were made. In 1934, the engine was upgraded and it was renamed the R 150, aligning the name with the displacement; production continued into 1935 and 1150 were made. In 1935, the car was made longer and the engine enlarged to 1.8 litres with an accompanying name change to "R 180"; the roadster model was dropped. This model was short lived, with production ending before the year was over and after only 300 examples had been built. The R 180 could be recognized from the exterior by having fully skirted front fenders.

In 1935, Stoewer took over the production rights to the Röhr Junior, a derivative of the Tatra 75 built in Hesse, which they continued to build under the name Stoewer Greif Junior. Production of Stoewer's own small cars was halted accordingly. In the spring of 1936, the Greif Junior received redesigned body work and other improvements. In 1937 the "Junior" part of the name was dropped and the car became the Stoewer Greif; this model continued to be built until 1939. The Greif Junior continued to use Tatra's horizontally opposed engine as had the Röhr Junior; this meant that the three generations of small Stoewers had used a vee-layout, a straight layout, and finally a horizontally opposed layout in succession.

== Specifications ==
The car was manufactured in a few different bodystyles: initially a 2-door saloon, a 2-door convertible, and a 2-door, 2+2 roadster. During 1933, the two-door saloon was replaced with a four-door, pillarless design with "clapping" doors (opening away from the centre), the same layout as the Lancia Aprilia saloon. The roadster kept the V 5 shorter wheelbase, but the cabriolet and saloons were on a longer one. The R 180 received a longer wheelbase yet; there was no roadster version of this variant. The engine was mounted front to rear, which meant that the starting handle was accessible directly from the interior.

The 1355 cc, four-cylinder Otto engine has 30 PS (22 kW) and 6 Volt electrical system. Top speeds range between 85 and 105 km/h (53 and 65 mph). The bored and stroked 1466 cc engine introduced during 1933 initially had the same maximum power. This was changed with the R 150, as power went up to 35 PS (26 kW), increasing top speeds by about 5 km/h. The car has front-wheel drive with swing axles at the front and rear and a three-speed transmission. The R 180's engine was bored out to 80 mm (3.15 in) while the stroke was brought back to the R 140's 88 mm (3.46 in), for a total displacement of 1769 cc and a maximum power of 45 PS (33 kW).

== Bibliography ==
- Oswald, Werner (1996). Deutsche Autos 1920–1945 (10th ed.). Stuttgart, Germany: Motorbuch Verlag. ISBN 3-87943-519-7.
