= Stoewer V 5 =

Stoewer V5
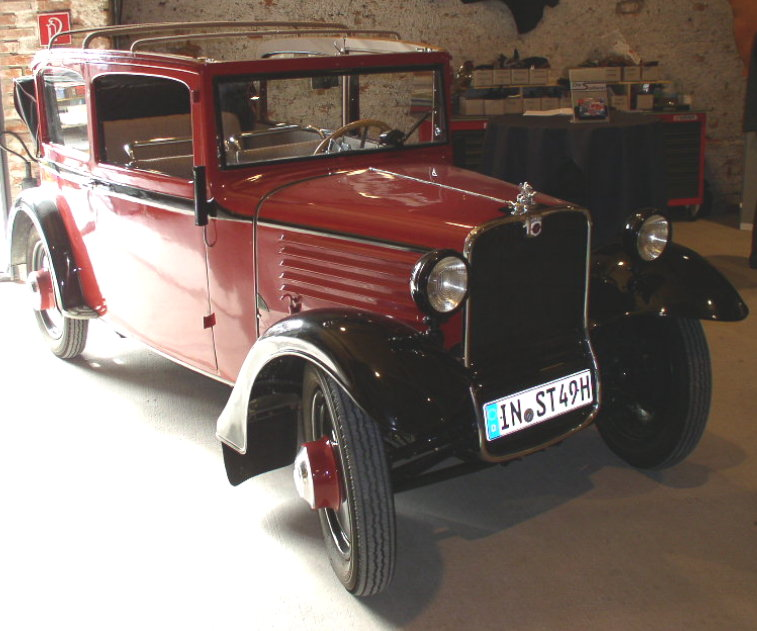

Overview
- Manufacturer: Stoewer
- Production: 1931–1932
- Assembly: Stettin, Germany (now Szczecin, Poland)

Body and chassis
- Class: Small car
- Body style: 2-door saloon; 2-door convertible; 2-door roadster
- Layout: Front-engine, front-wheel-drive

Powertrain
- Engine: 1.2 L SV V4
- Transmission: 3-speed manual

Dimensions
- Wheelbase: 2,500 mm (98.4 in)
- Length: 3,500 mm (137.8 in)
- Width: 1,540 mm (60.6 in)
- Height: 1,600 mm (63.0 in)
- Curb weight: Chassis: 475 kg (1,047 lb); Sedan: 700 kg (1,543 lb)

Chronology
- Successor: Stoewer R 140

Stoewer V5 is a small car manufactured by Stoewer automotive company between 1931 and 1932. It has front-wheel drive with 1.2-litre four-cylinder engine and is available in saloon and roadster versions. This, together with the DKW F1, were Germany's first mass-produced front-wheel drive cars. The V5 was a departure for the Stoewer company, which had been focussed on larger, more luxurious automobiles heretofore, typically built to order. As the light, front-wheel drive V5 was deemed unsuitable for requisition by the German armed forces, the company's Nazi-controlled supervisory board demanded that Stoewer stop manufacturing this model. The Stoewer brothers were absolutely opposed to this idea, their aspiration being to manufacture modern cars for civilian use, and as a result both Emil and Bernhard Stoewer were forced out of their own company by 1934.

== History ==
Stoewer V5 was manufactured in Stettin, Germany (now Szczecin, Poland) by Stoewer automotive company between 1931 and 1932. In 1931, 1380 cars were made and in 1932, 720 were made. The V4 engine was not a success in the market and the car's successor, the Stoewer R 140, returned to a traditional, inline design.

== Specifications ==
The car was manufactured in versions: 2-door sedan with a soft, roll-back roof, as a 2-door convertible, and as a 2-door, 2+2 roadster. It has 1.2-litre four-cylinder Otto engine that had 25 PS (18 kW) at 3500 rpm, and 6 Volt electric power, while it consumes 8.1 litres of fuel per 100 km. Its top speed is 80 km/h (50 mph). There was also a sportier version of the engine, available on the cabriolet and standard on the roadster, which produces 30 PS (22 kW), allowing it to reach a top speed of 100 km/h (62 mph). The car has front-wheel drive with swing axles at the front and rear and a three-speed transmission. A 2-door delivery van was also referenced at the time of introduction.

The stroke ratio is 68 mm × 82 mm. The car weighs 700 kg (1,543 lb). It is 3500 mm long, 1540 mm wide, 1600 mm high, and has a wheelbase of 2500 mm. The axle track is 1250 mm.

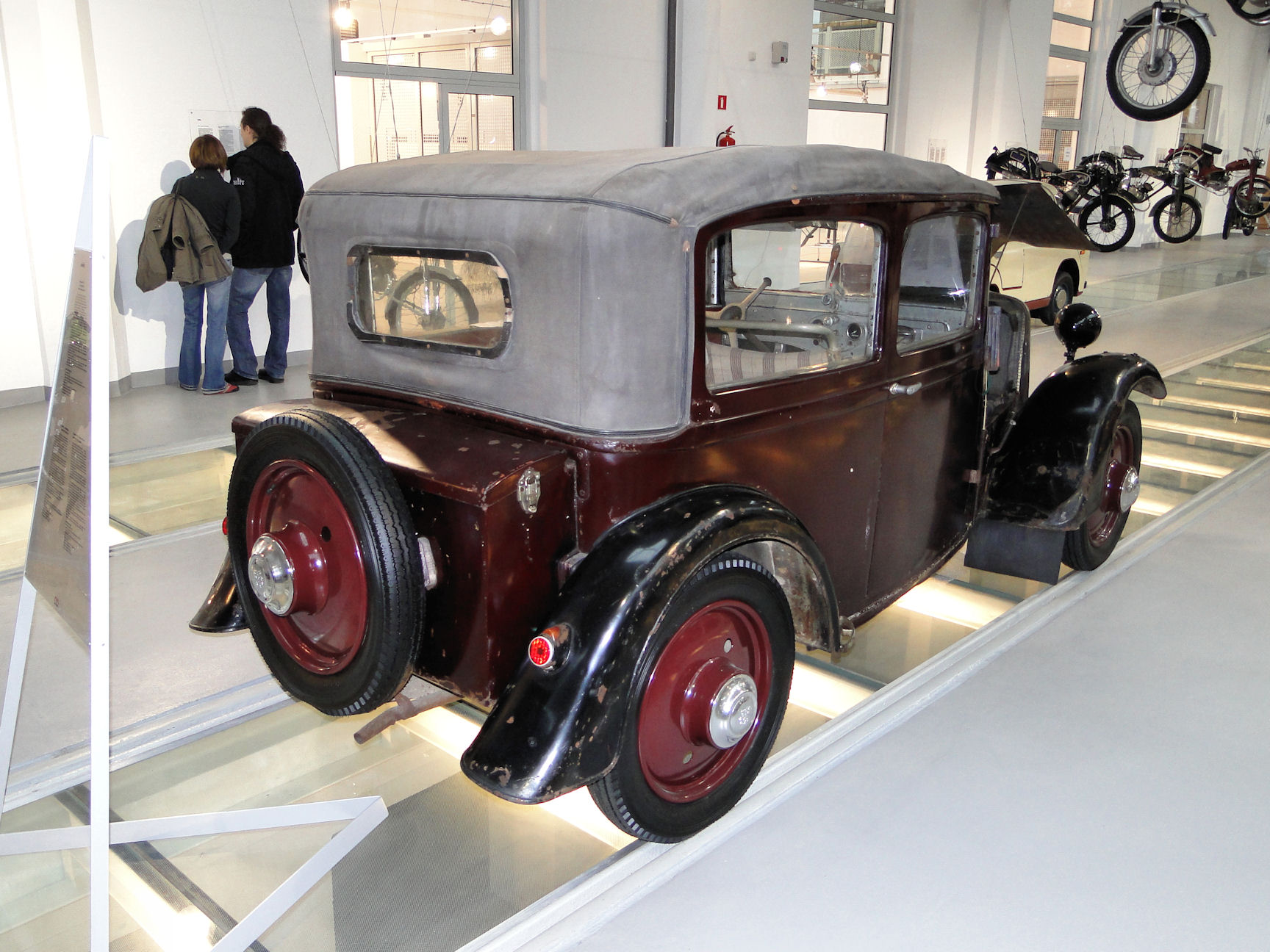
Rear view

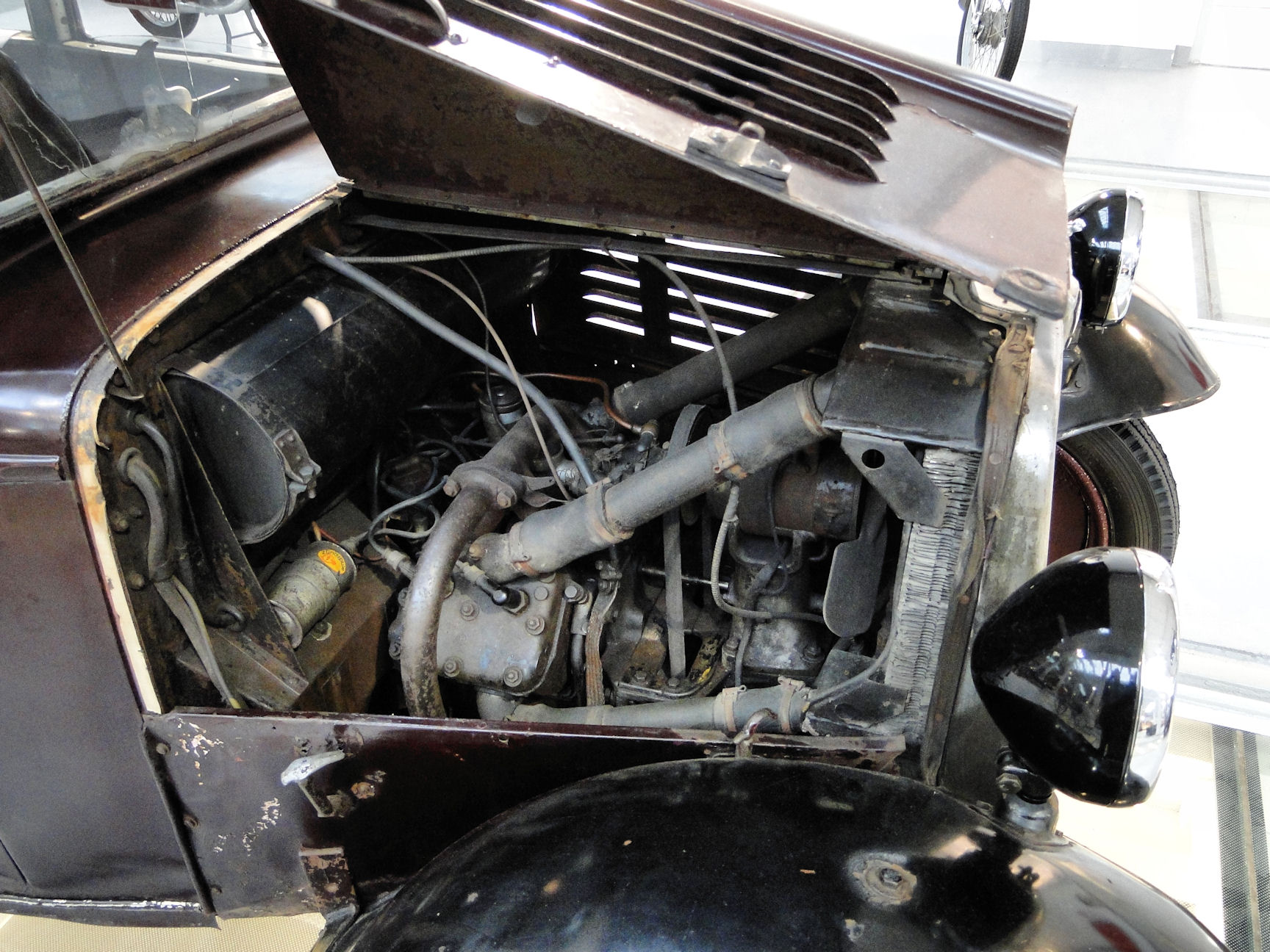
The V4 engine; note the fuel tank mounted against the bulkhead

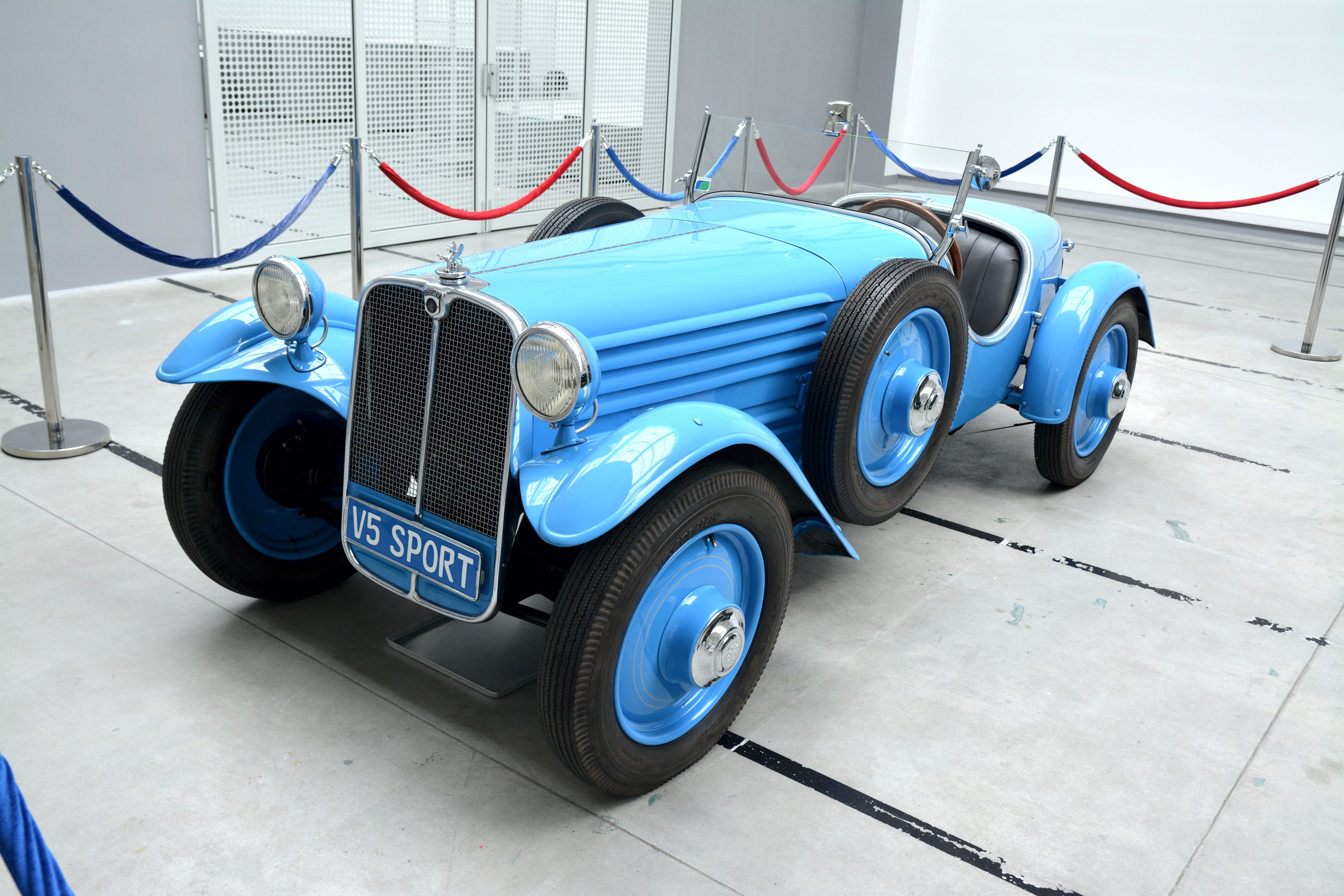
The Stoewer V5 Sport (roadster)

== Bibliography ==
- Oswald, Werner (1996). Deutsche Autos 1920–1945 (10th ed.). Stuttgart, Germany: Motorbuch Verlag. ISBN 3-87943-519-7.
