= Großer Stoewer Motorwagen =

1899 concept car manufactured by Stoewer

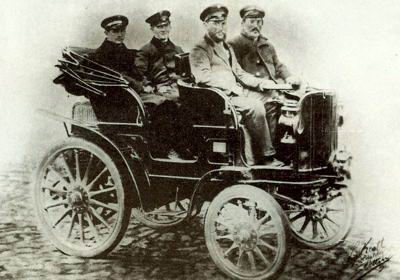
- Großer Stoewer Motorwagen in 1899.

Overview
- Manufacturer: Stoewer
- Production: 1899
- Assembly: Stettin, Germany (now Szczecin, Poland)
- Designer: Bernhard Stoewer; Emil Stoewer

Body and chassis
- Class: Passenger car

Powertrain
- Engine: 2.1-litre 2-cylinder

Chronology
- Successor: Stoewer 10 PS

Großer Stoewer Motorwagen (German: [ˈɡʁoː.sɐ ˈʃtøː.vəʁ ˈmoːtoːɐ̯ˌvaːɡən], lit. 'Large Stoewer Motor Car') is the convertible concept car manufactured by Stoewer automotive company in 1899. It was designed by Bernhard and Emil Stoewer, and was the first car presented by the company.

== History ==
The concept car was designed by brothers Bernhard and Emil Stoewer. It was manufactured and presented by the Stoewer in 1899, the same year, the company was founded. It was built in Stettin, Germany (now Szczecin, Poland). It was the first car made by the company, and one of the first in Germany. Its name, Großer Motorwagen means in German Large Motor Car. The model of the car in the original condition is kept in the Polytechnic Museum in Moscow, Russia.

== Specifications ==
The car was a convertible four-seater. It had a 2.1-litre 2-cylinder engine. Its maximum speed was 17 km/h (11 mph). It had 6.5 brake horsepower.
