= Stoewer P6 =

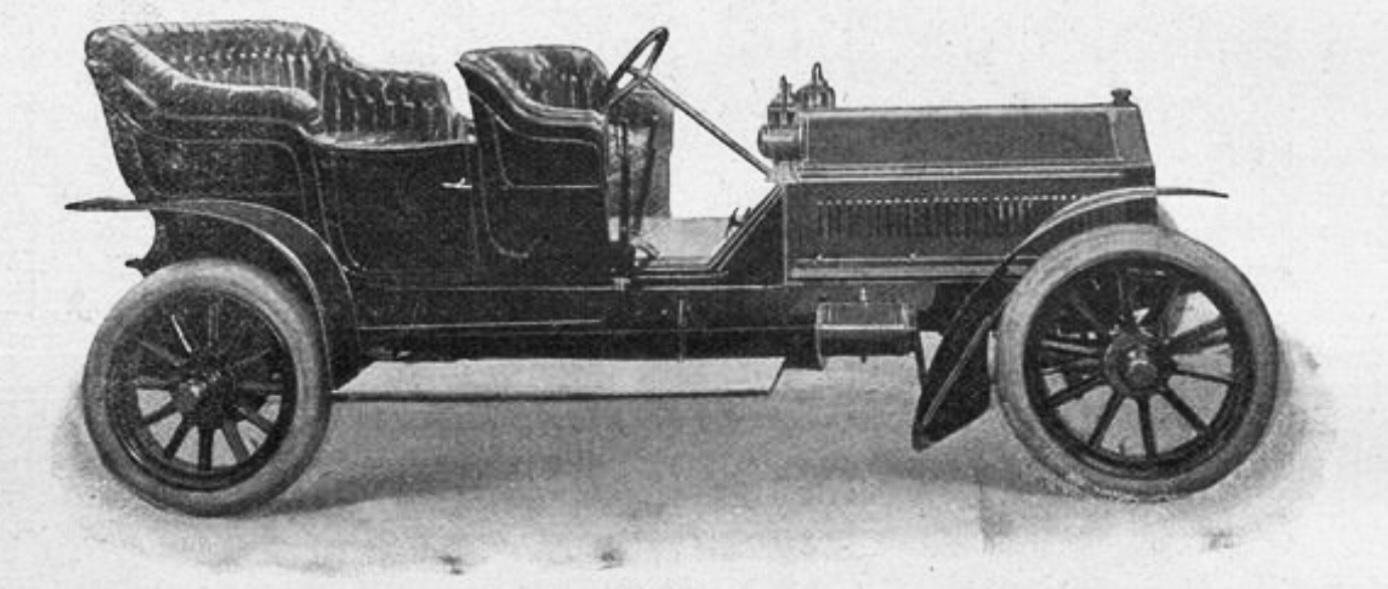
- Illustration depicting the Stoewer P6 as a Phaeton

Overview
- Manufacturer: Stoewer
- Production: 1906–1911
- Assembly: Stettin, Germany (now Szczecin, Poland)

Body and chassis
- Class: Car

Powertrain
- Engine: 8.8-litre straight-6-cylinder ICE
- Transmission: manual 4-speed

Chronology
- Predecessor: Stoewer 28/40
- Successor: Stoewer F4

Stoewer P6 was convertible car manufactured in Stettin, Germany (now Szczecin, Poland) by Stoewer automotive company between 1906 and 1911. It had a 8.8-litre internal combustion engine.

== Specifications ==
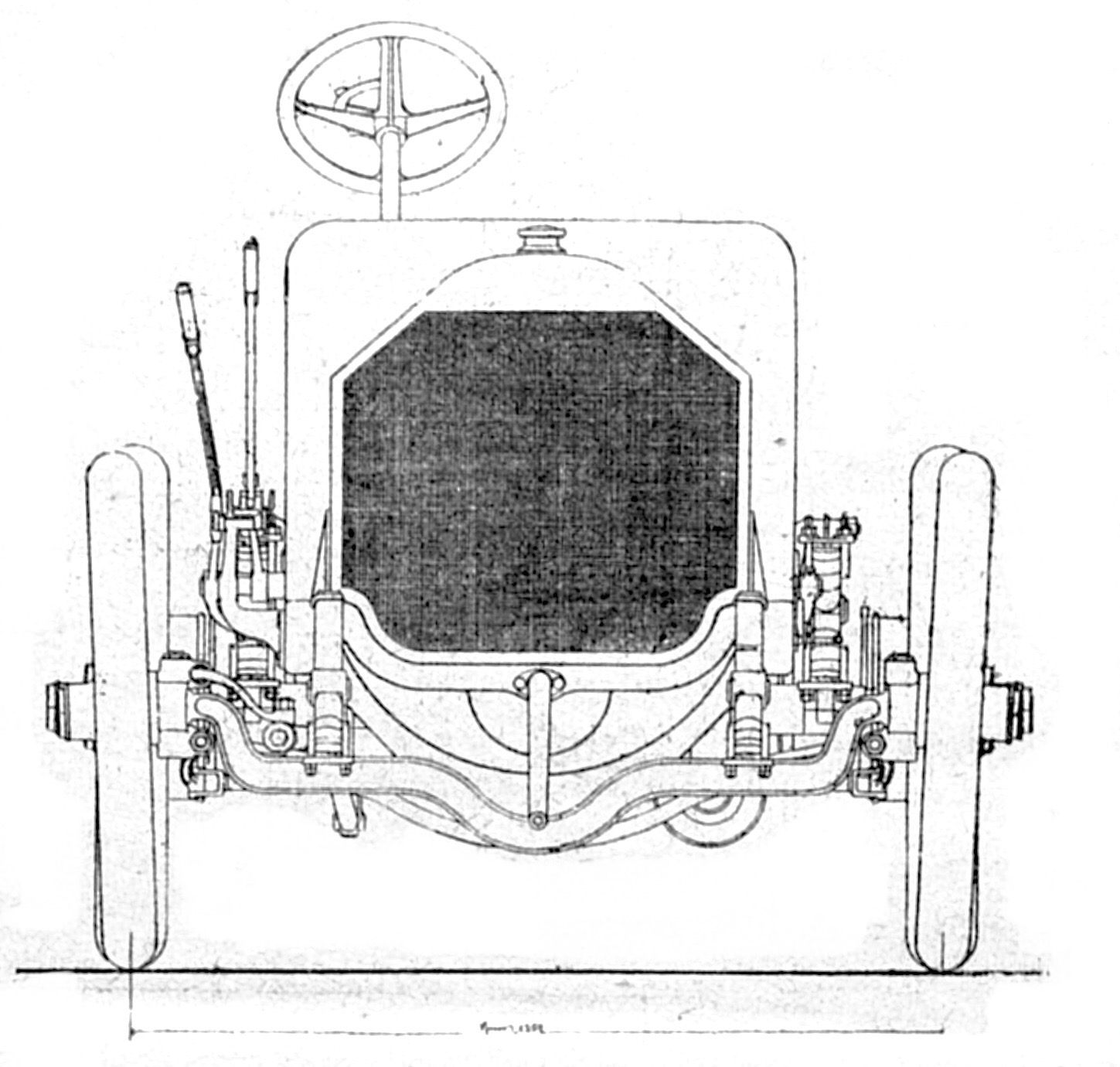
Stoewer P6 Front

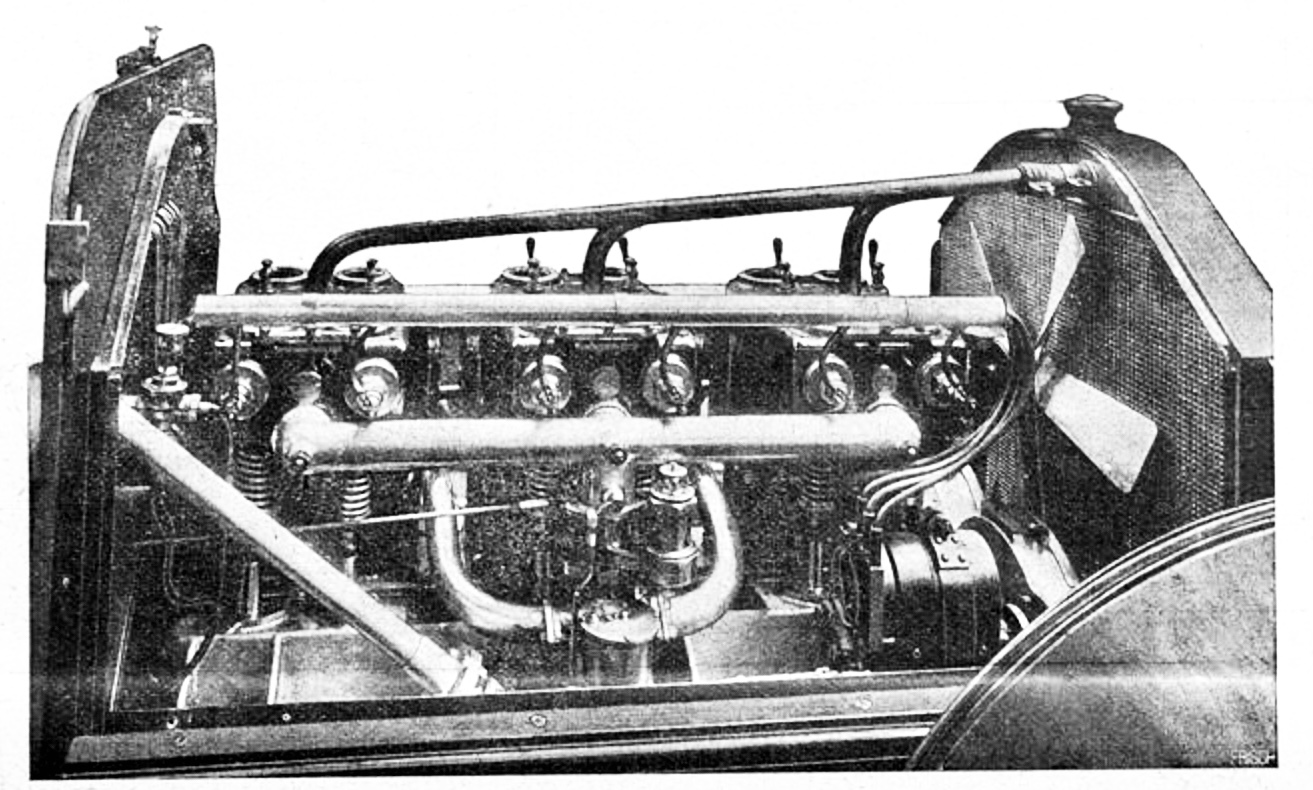
Stoewer P6 engine displacement 8822 cm³

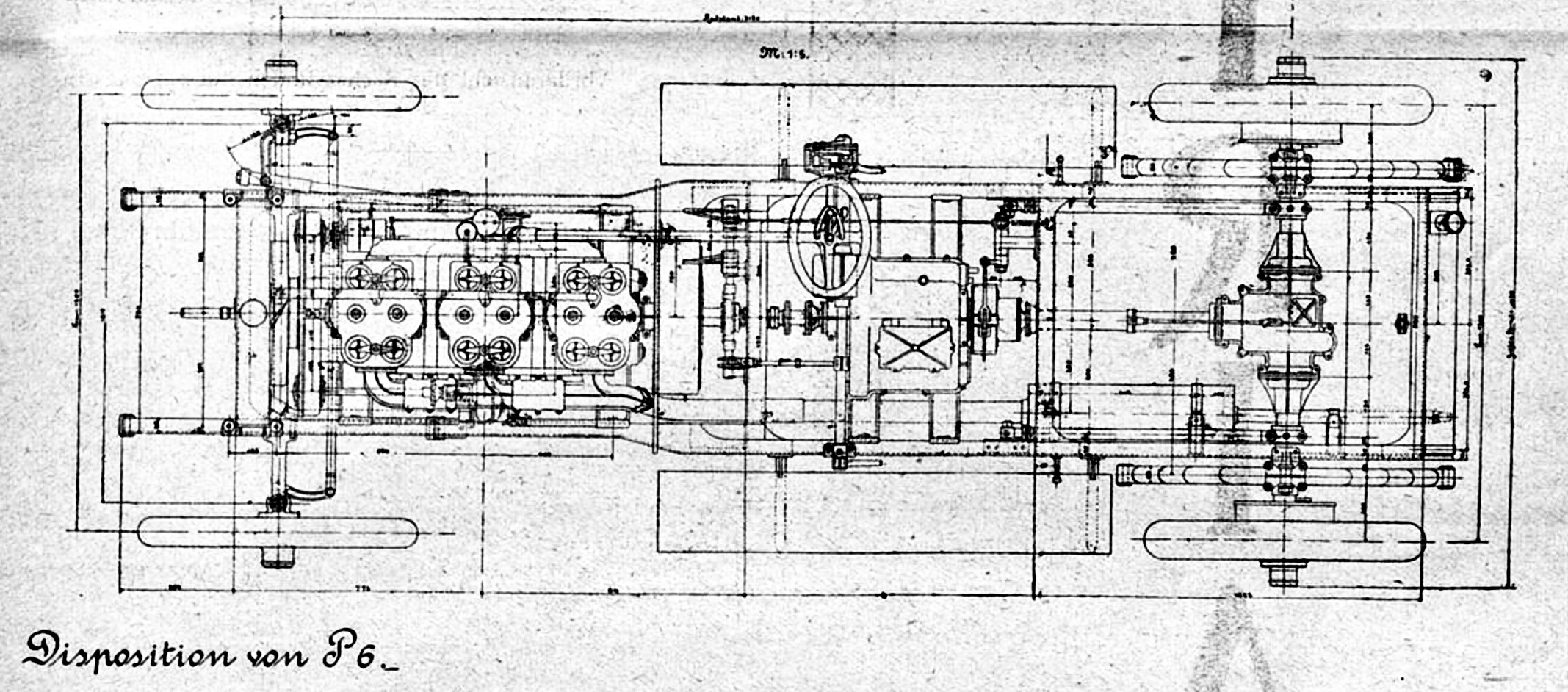
Stoewer P6 top view

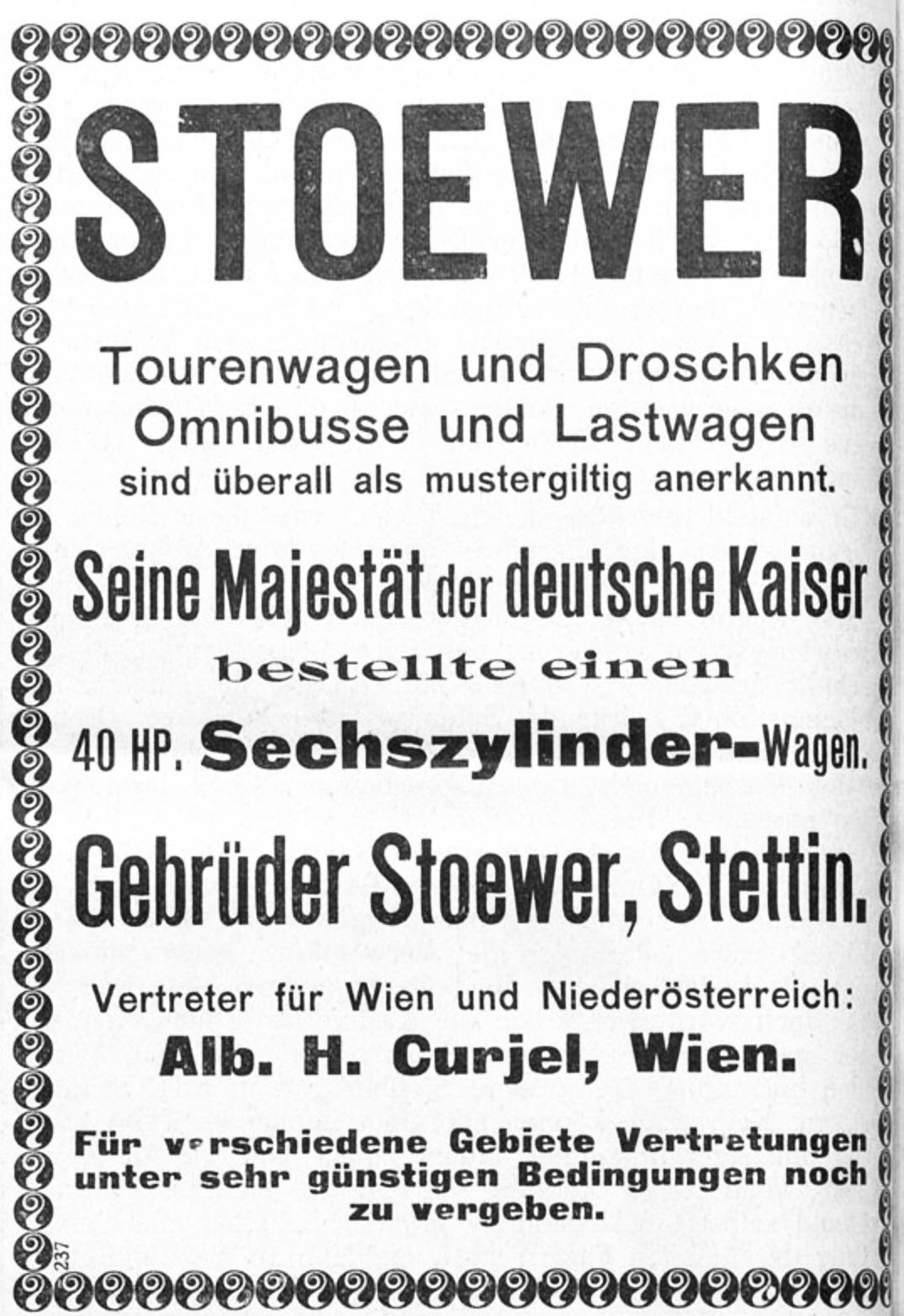
Order of a Stoewer P6 by the German Emperor Wilhelm II after viewing it at the motor show in Berlin.

The car was a multi-seater convertible with a 8.8-liter inline 6-cylinder internal combustion engine with a power output of 60 horsepower (44 kW) and a tax rating of 34 hp. It had a manual four-speed transmission. Its top speed was 95 km/h (59 mph). It had a displacement of 8822 cm³ with a bore of 120 mm and a stroke of 130 mm. Bore and stroke were exactly the same as those of the four-cylinder engine from the P4-1. The crankshaft is supported by four bearings. The inlet and outlet valves are the same size to simplify possible repairs. The carburetor can be preheated through two pipes with a shut-off valve depending on the season. The water pump is located on the left side of the vehicle. The cylinders of the engine are cast in pairs. The vehicle is designed as a right-hand drive. The rear axle is driven via a drive shaft. Directly behind the rear axle the fuel tank with the filling opening can be found.
