= Stoewer 10 PS =

Convertible car manufactured by Stoewer between 1901 and 1902

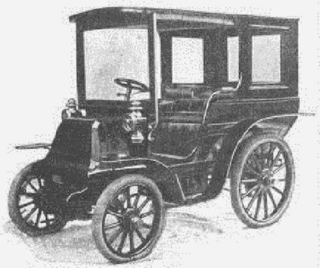
- Illustration depicting Stoewer 10 PS.

Overview
- Manufacturer: Stoewer
- Production: 1901–1902
- Assembly: Stettin, Germany (now Szczecin, Poland)

Body and chassis
- Class: Car

Powertrain
- Engine: 1.5-litre straight-2-cylinder ICE
- Transmission: manual 4-speed

Chronology
- Predecessor: Großer Stoewer Motorwagen
- Successor: Stoewer 8/14 PS

Stoewer 10 PS is a convertible car manufactured in Stettin, Germany (now Szczecin, Poland) by Stoewer automotive company between 1901 and 1902. It is the first car created by the company. It had a four-wheel drive and 1.5-litre internal combustion engine.

== Specifications ==
The car was a 2-door convertible with a 1.5-litre straight-2-cylinder internal combustion engine with the power of 18 horsepower (13 kW) and 17 brake horsepower. It had a four-wheel drive and manual four-speed transmission. Its top speed was 50 km/h (31 mph). It had a capacity of 1527 cm³.

== Bibliography ==
- Jubiläumsfestschrift der A. G. Bernh: Steower Stettin: 1858–1908, in: Deutsche Industrie, deutsche Kultur, vol. 6, 1908. Nr. 2. Katalog der SLUB Dresden.
- Gerhard Maerz. Die Geschichte der Stoewer-Automobile. Kohlhammer Edition, Stuttgart. 1983, ISBN 3-17-007931-X.
