= Stoewer =

1896–1945 automotive brand manufacturer

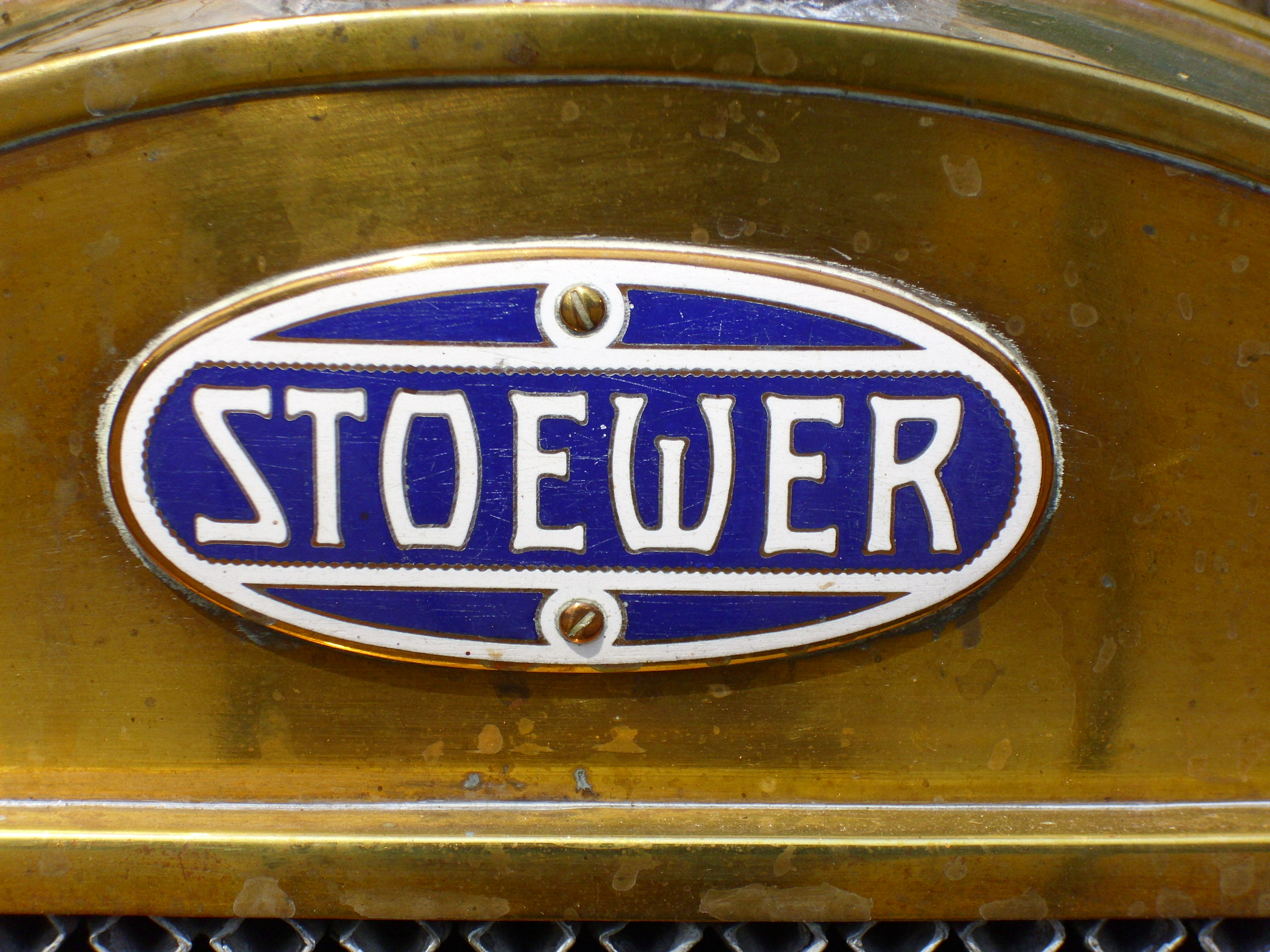
- Native name: Gebrüder Stoewer, Fabrik für Motorfahrzeugen
- Industry: Manufacture of bicycles and invalid carriages Manufacture of machinery for textile, apparel and leather production manufacture of motor vehicles manufacture of other special-purpose machinery n.e.c. metal industry
- Founded: 1899; 127 years ago
- Founders: Emil Stoewer; Bernhard Stoewer
- Fate: Dissolved when its factory was dismantled and equipment sent to the Soviet Union by the Red Army following World War II
- Headquarters: Stettin, Germany
- Number of employees: 500 (1904)

Stoewer (German: [ˈʃtøː.vər]) was a German automobile manufacturer before World War II whose headquarters were in Stettin (now Szczecin, Poland).

== History ==
The company was founded in 1858 by Bernhard Stoewer as a precision mechanical repair shop, after the local garrison had hired him to repair a sewing machine. In the same year, production of sewing machines in Stettin began. By the time of their fiftieth anniversary in the year 1908, 75,000 sewing machines and 6,000,000 typewriters had already been produced.

In 1899, the ironworks was taken over by the sons, the Stoewer brothers, Emil (1873 – 1942) and Bernhard (1875 – 1937) founded the firm Gebrüder Stoewer, Fabrik für Motorfahrzeugen and started to produce automobiles. Their first car was the Großer Stoewer Motorwagen, with 6.5 PS (4.8 kW) and 17 km/h (11 mph) maximum speed. Stoewer was thus one of the pioneer carmakers in Germany.

In March 1906, the company Stoewer stopped producing chains and pedals for bicycles and used the factory hall to expand automobile production. With the freed-up 2000 square meters, they aimed to increase production from about 100 vehicles in 1905 to about 250 vehicles in 1906.

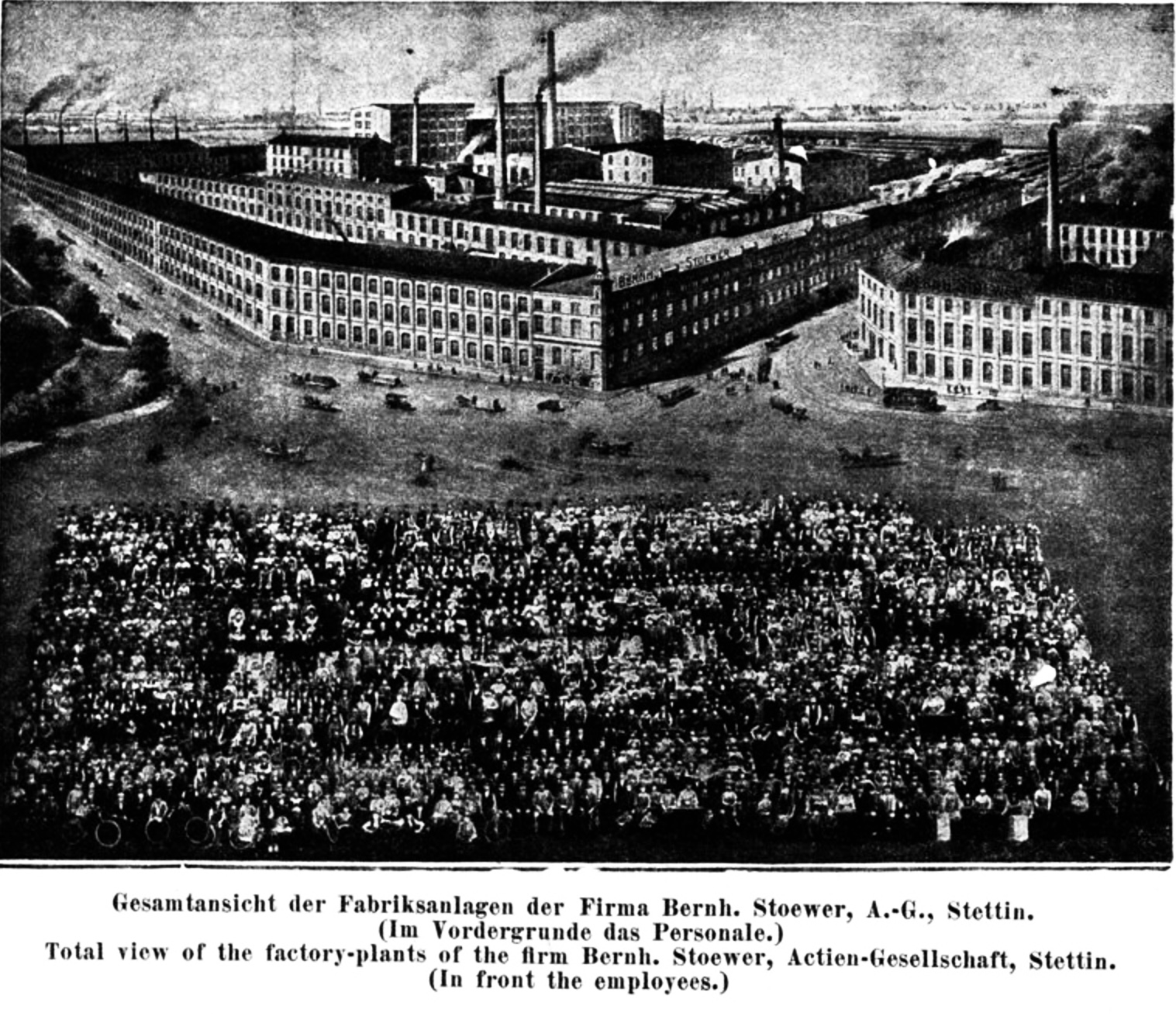
Factory plant Stoewer with employees

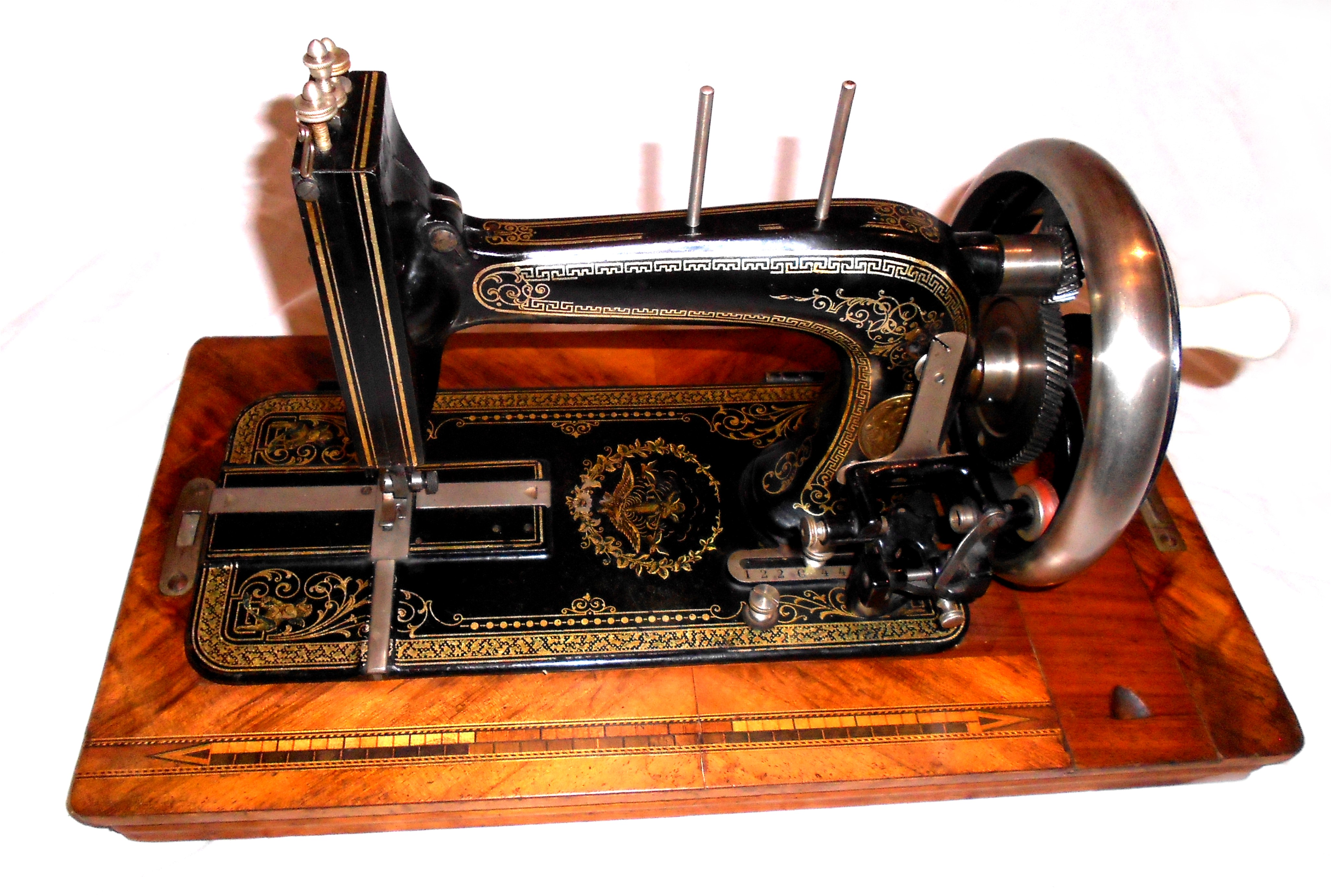
Stoewer Sewing Machine from about 1912

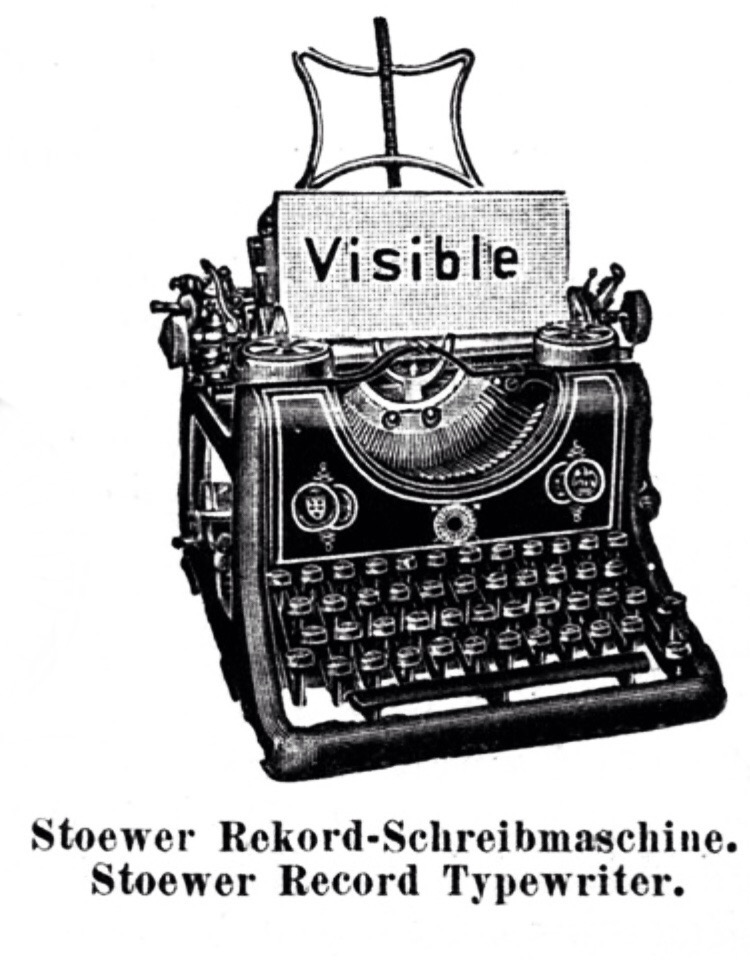
Stoewer Record Typewriter

Stoewer typewriter model IV

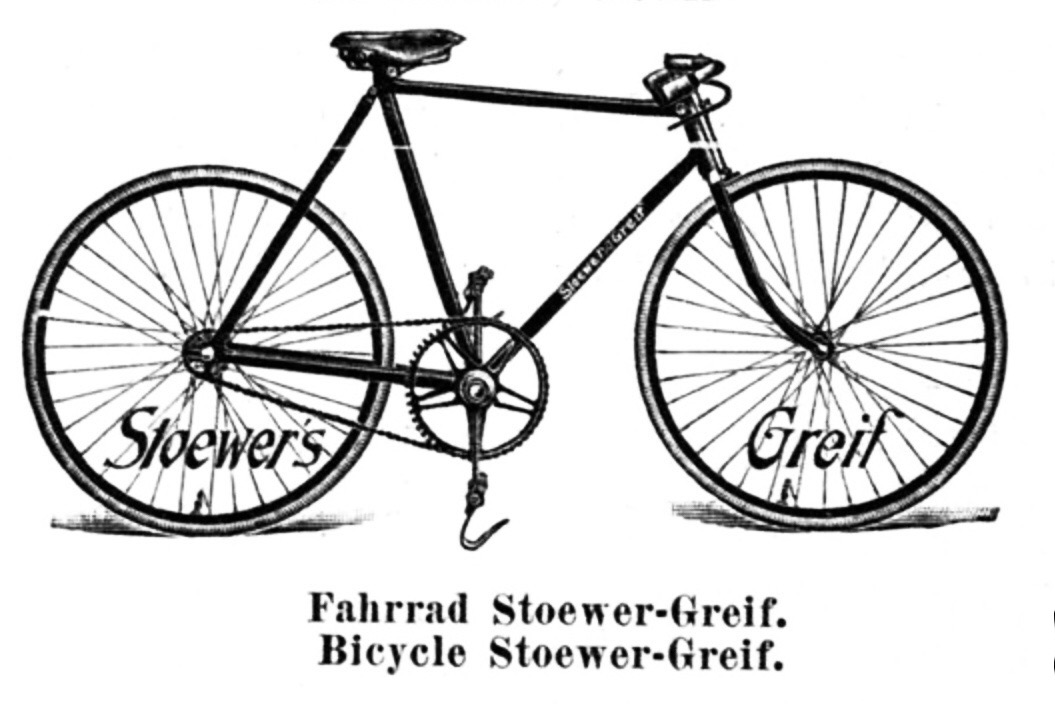
Stoewer Bicycle Greif

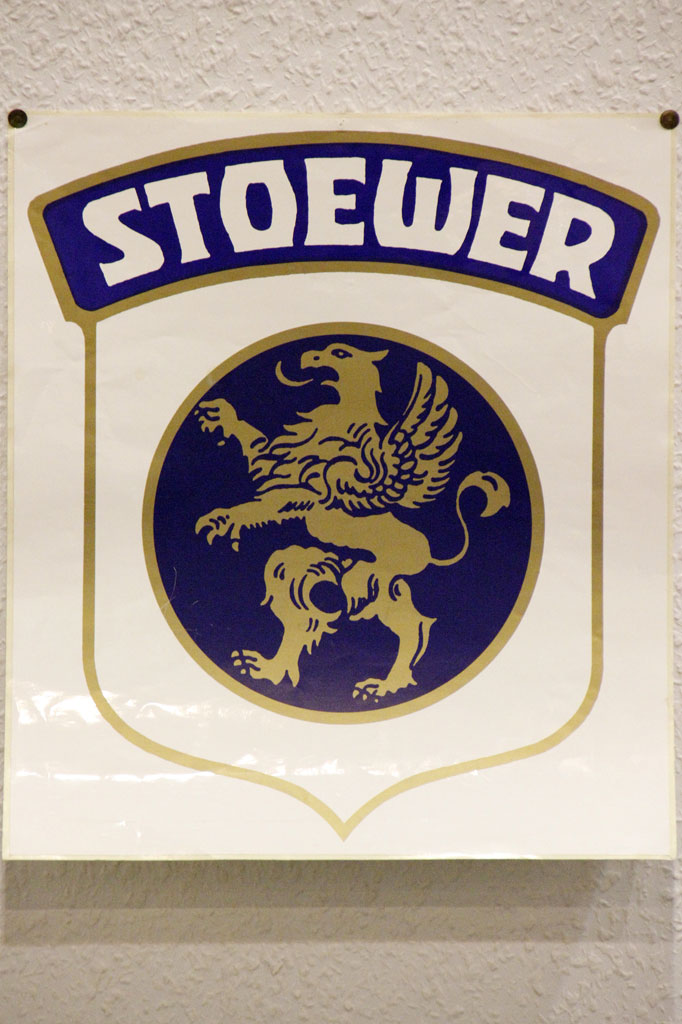
Logo of Stoewer in 1939

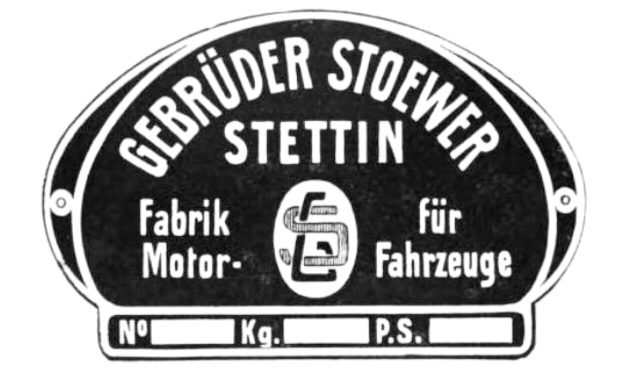
Vehicle data plate Stoewer (1904)

In late summer 1907, the company entered into a partnership with carmaker Deutsche Motorfahrzeugfabrik GmbH. Stoewer wanted to utilize their newly expanded factory by producing the Autognom. In return, the German Motor Vehicle Factory was to take on exclusive sales of Stoewer vehicles.

In 1908 Stoewers constructed the Stoewer G4. This model was successful for them at the time – 1,070 cars were built. In 1910, Stoewer cars were also built under licence in France, by Mathis of Strasbourg. In 1916, the family-owned company was changed into a limited company under the name of Stoewer-Werke AG, vormals Gebrüder Stoewer.

In the mid-20s a new class of cars was introduced: the D-Types included D3, D9 and D10 with four-cylinder engines, as well as D5, D6 and D12 with six cylinders. Something special was the 1921 D7 with a proprietary six-cylinder aero engine with 120 PS (88 kW). Of the fifty "D10" made, the only survivor was located in Melbourne, Australia in original condition; it has since been brought to Germany.

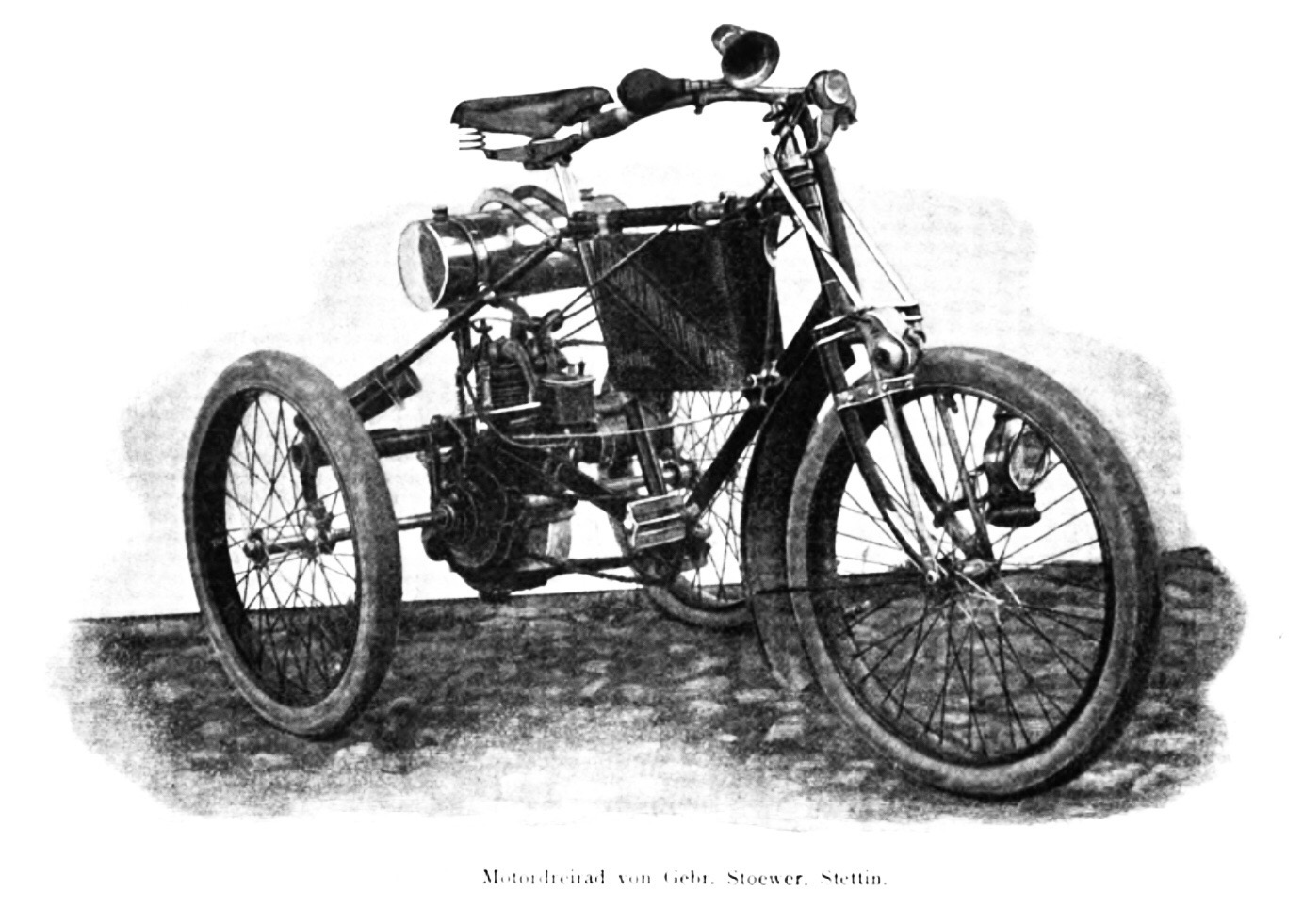
Stoewer Motordreirad (1899)

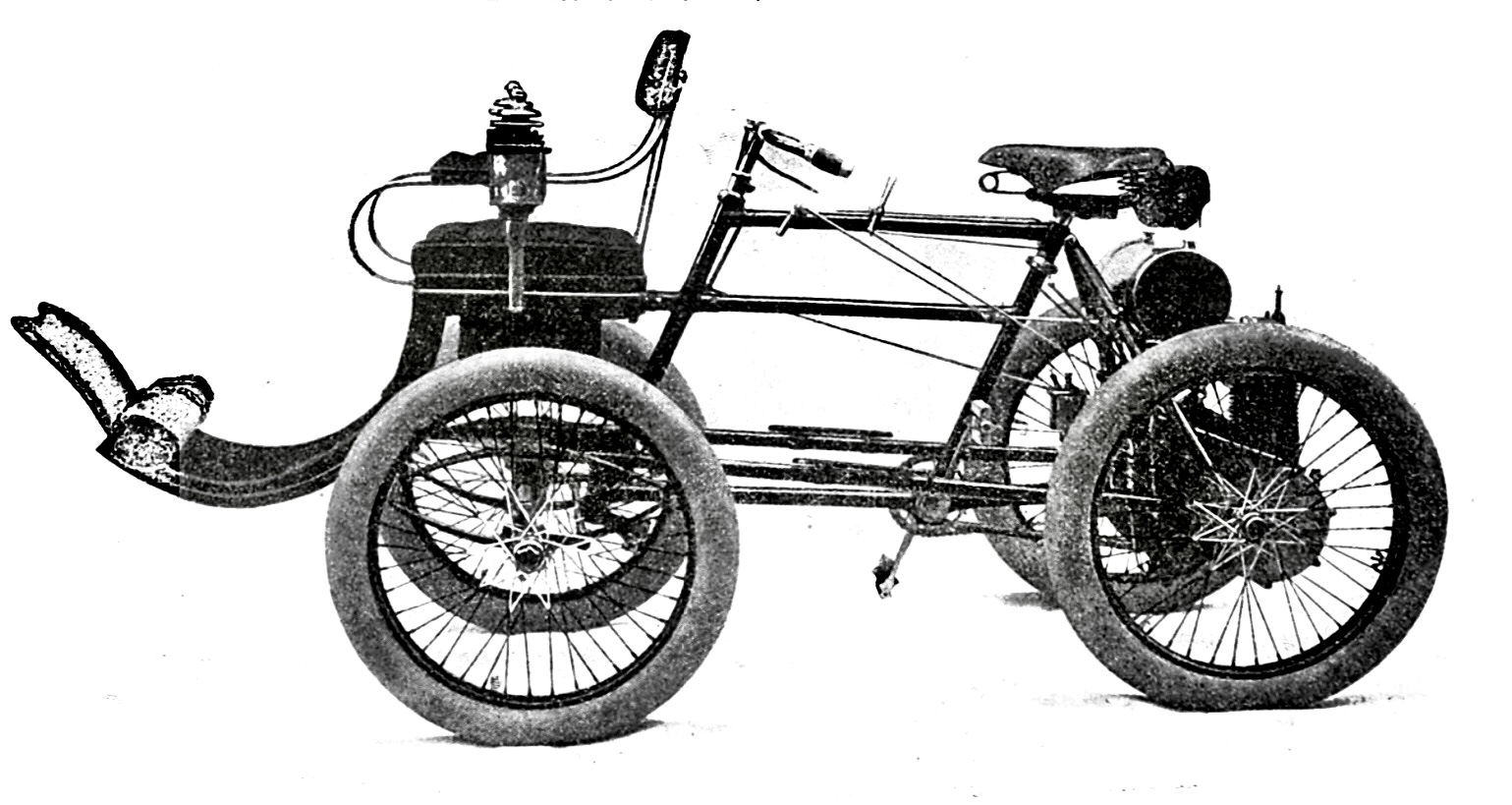
Stoewer four-wheeled Motorcycle (1899)

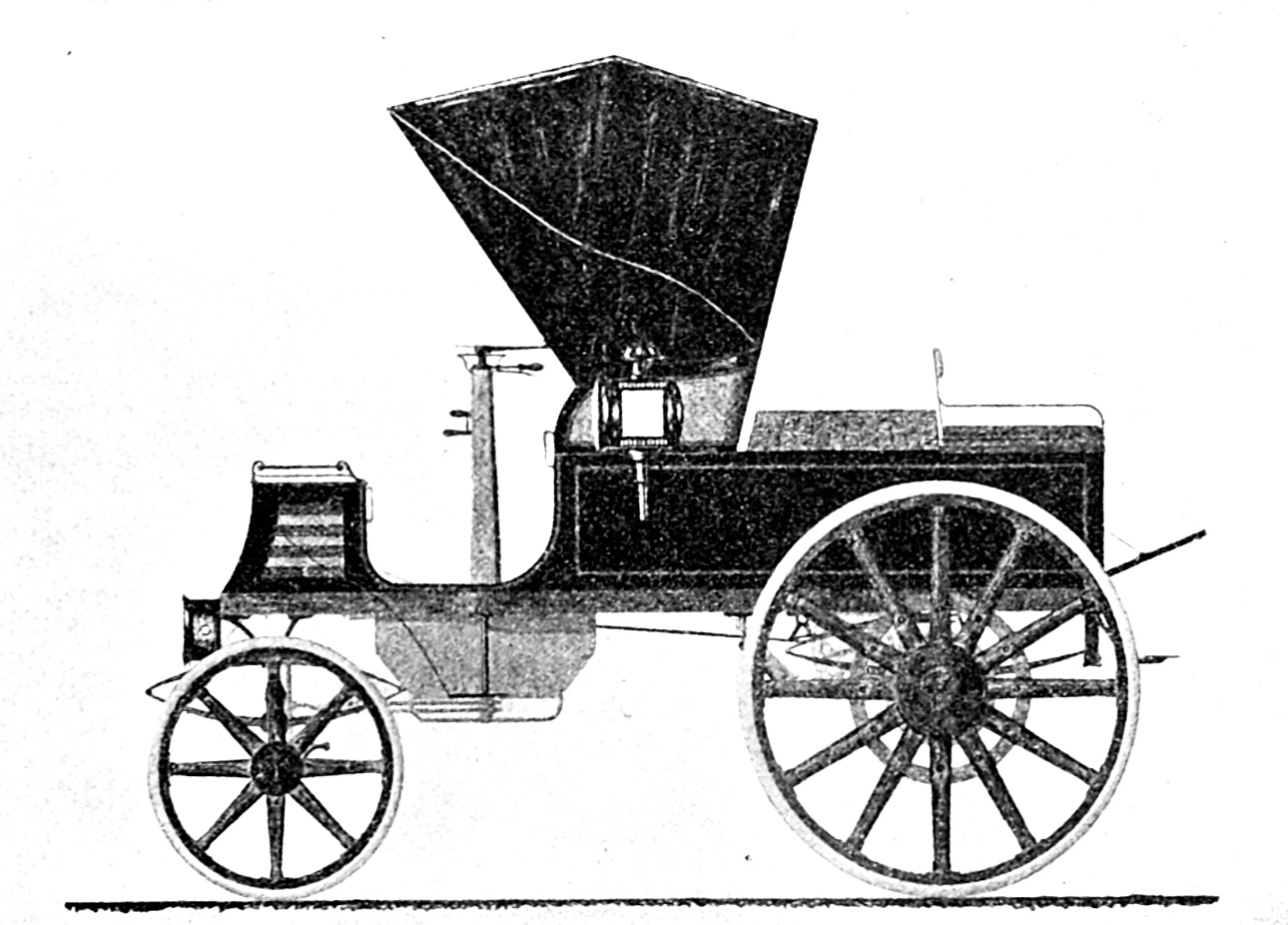
Stoewer electric phaeton (1899)

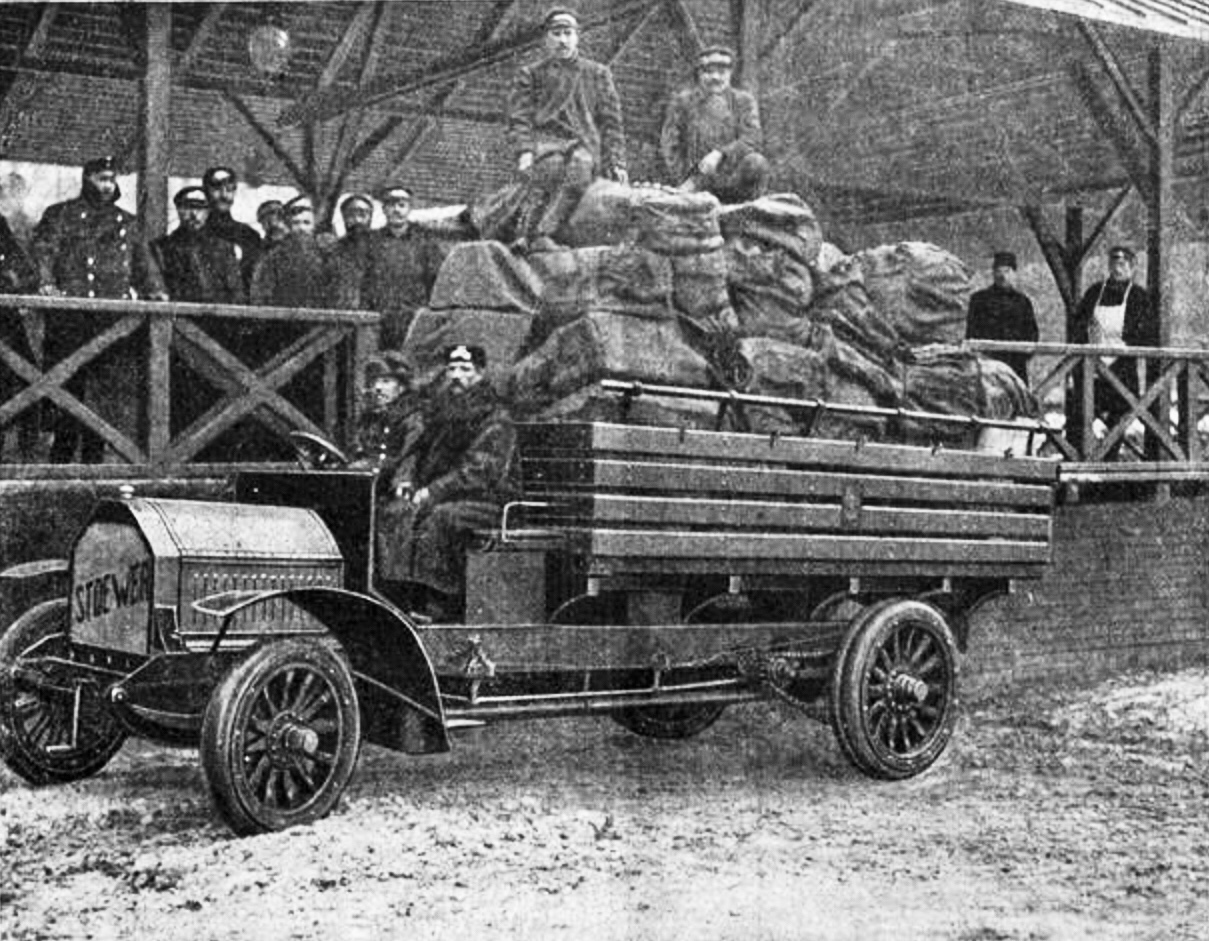
Stoewer subsidy truck L 4 III (1909-1912)

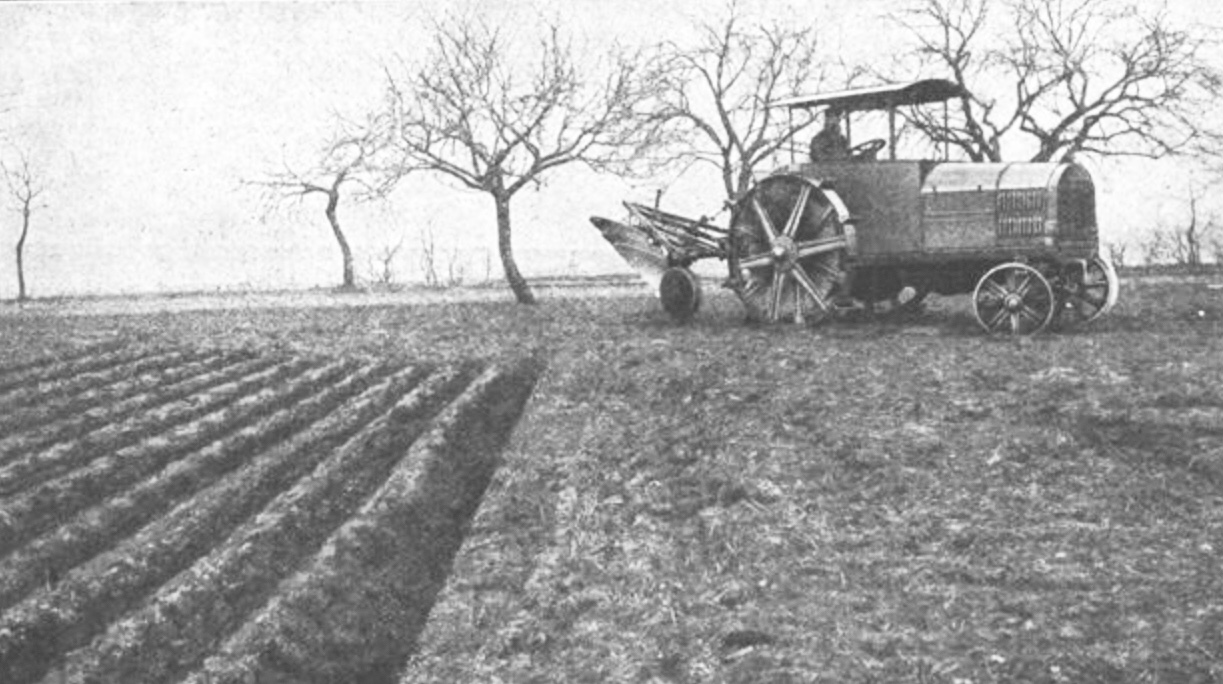
Stoewer Tractor Type 3 S 17 (1919-1926)

In 1928 the company started to build S8 and G14 models with eight-cylinder engines. In the early 1930s Stoewer produced its highlights: G15 Gigant, M12 Marschall and P20 Repräsentant, each with eight-cylinder engines, with 60 to 120 PS (44 to 88 kW) and a maximum speed of 130 km/h (81 mph). The production of these cars had to be cancelled after 2,500 vehicles were produced due to worldwide economic troubles. In 1931, Stoewer constructed one of the first cars with front-wheel drive, the Stoewer V 5 with 25 PS (18 kW), 80 km/h (50 mph) maximum speed. The model named Greif Junior was built under the licence of Tatra. Its successor V8 Greif was the last car made by Stoewer himself; class Arkona and Sedina were the last civilian cars produced by the company.

In 1936, the Stoewer factory developed the 'uniform light off-road car' (le.E.Pkw, leichter geländegängiger Einheits-PKW) for the German army, a versatile four-wheel drive car, the Stoewer R200 initially (until 1940) equipped with four-wheel steering. Due to capacity limitations, the cars also had to be produced by BMW-Factory Eisenach, as the BMW 325, and by Hanomag in Hanover as the Type 20 B. Together the three manufacturers made a total of ca. 13,000 units, of which 2,000 were built by Stoewer. Stoewer's founders were pushed out in the early 1930s for being too focussed on civilian cars, and control of the company fell to a Nazi-controlled supervisory board. Stoewer AG was one of many German companies that exploited slave labour during World War II, maintaining their own camp for prisoners. After World War II, the Red Army seized the remaining production facilities, dismantled the factory and sent the equipment to the Soviet Union, and the company ceased to exist.

== Passenger car models ==
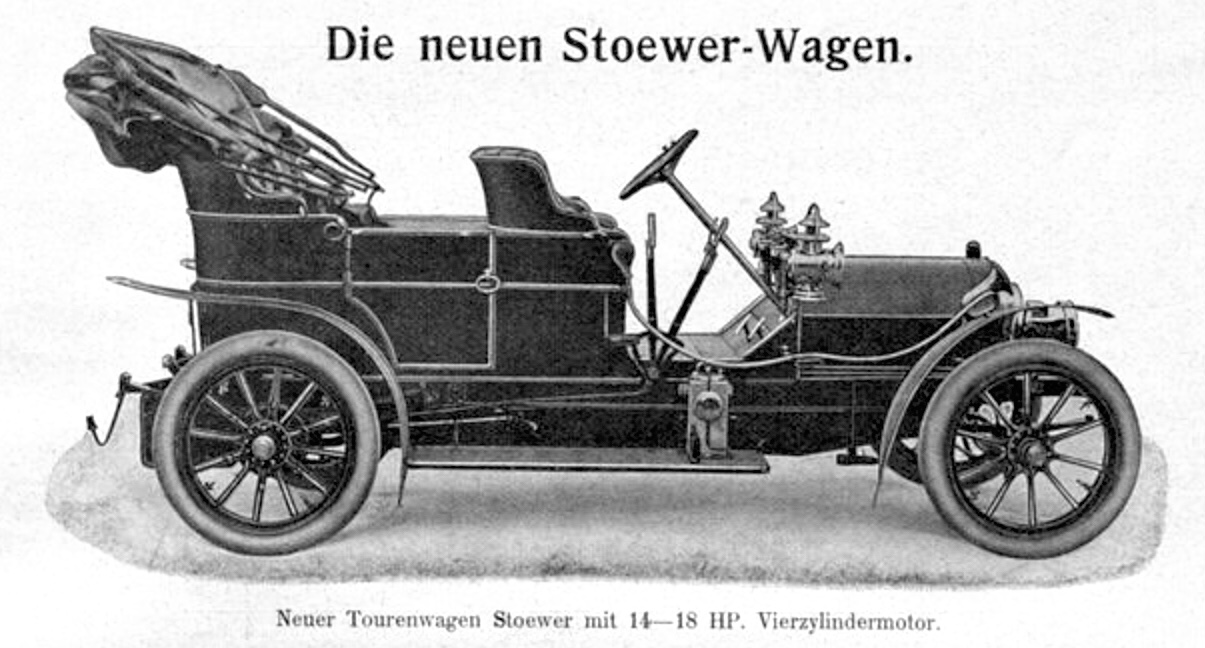
Stoewer P4 (1905-1910)

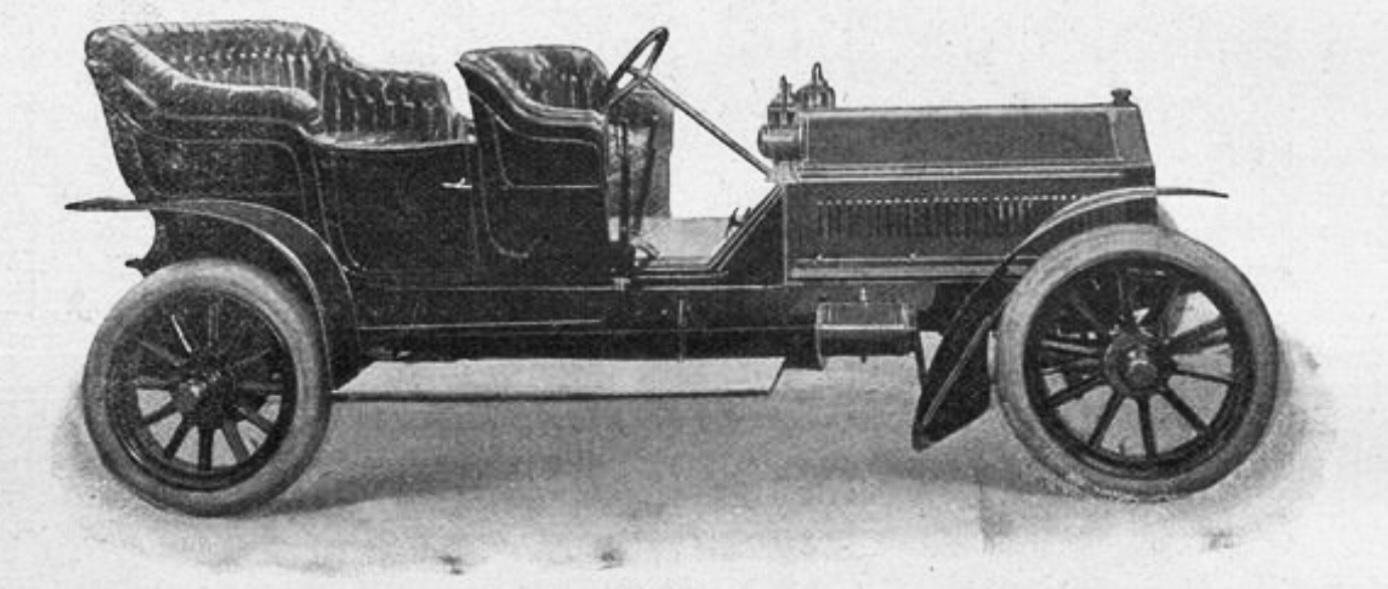
Stoewer P6

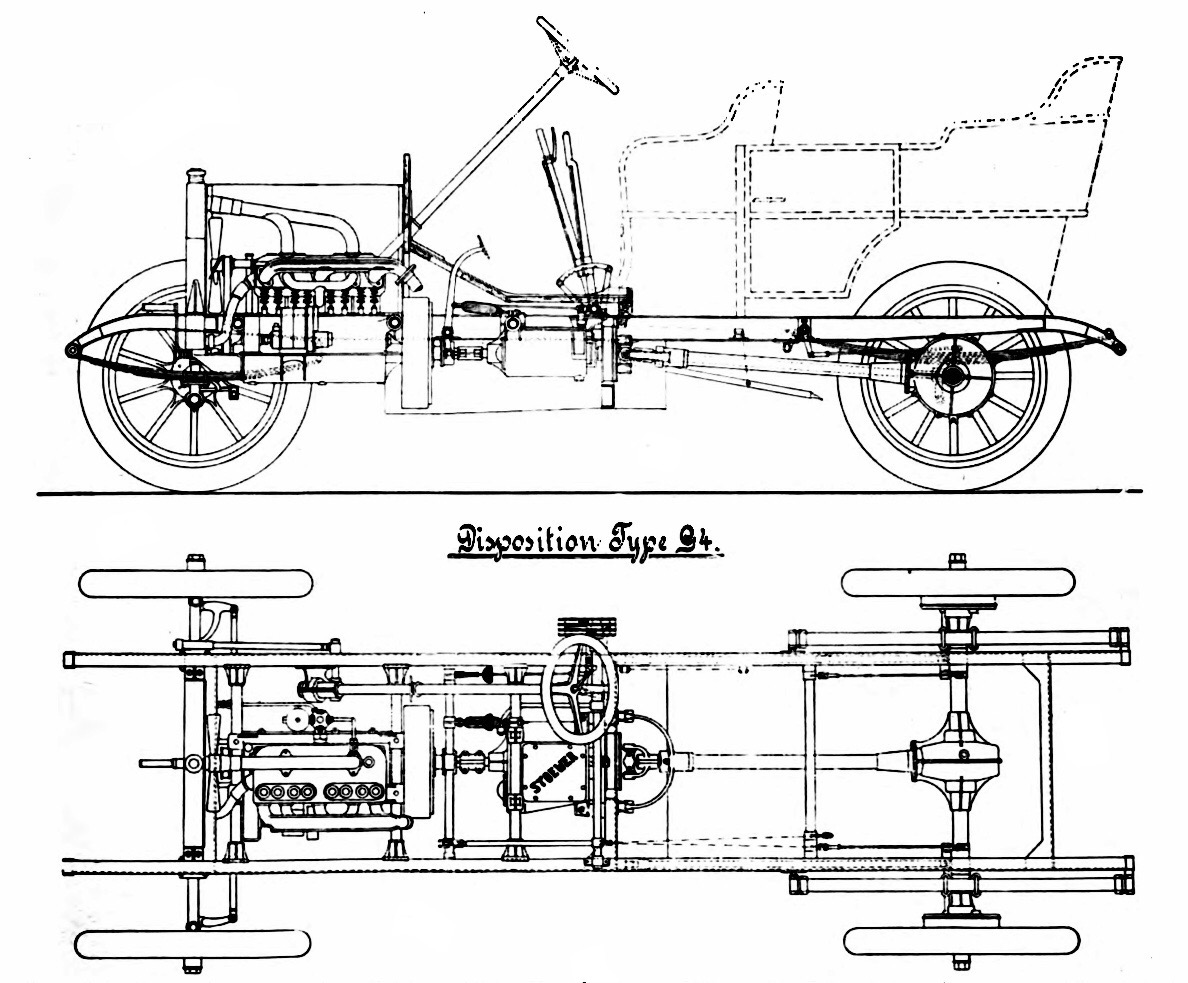
Stoewer Type G4 (1907-1911)

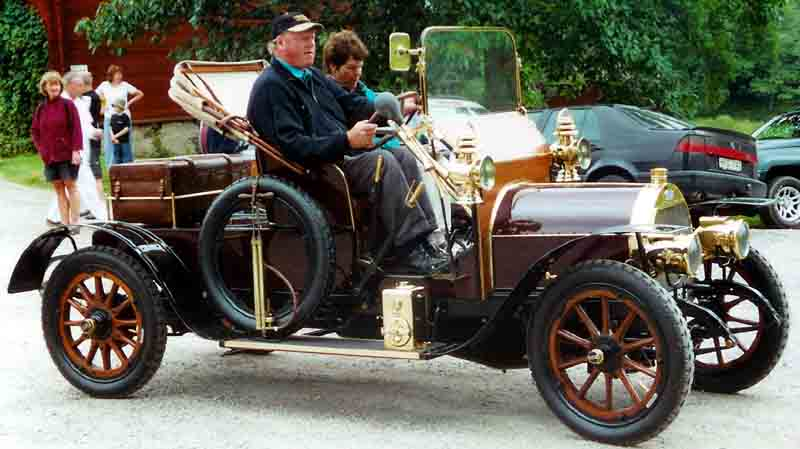
Stoewer LT 4 1910

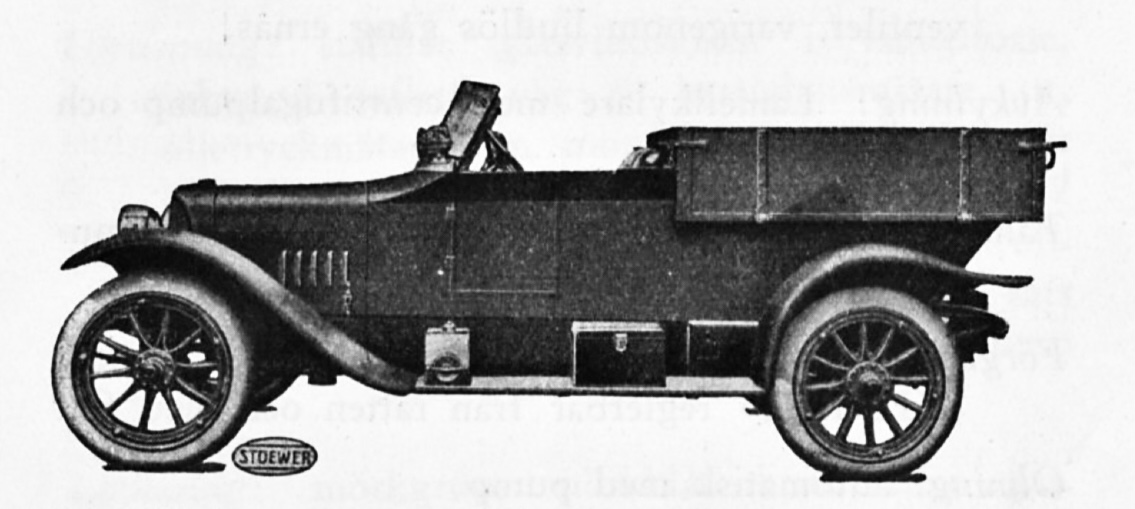
Delivery vehicle based on Stoewer D3 (1920-1923)

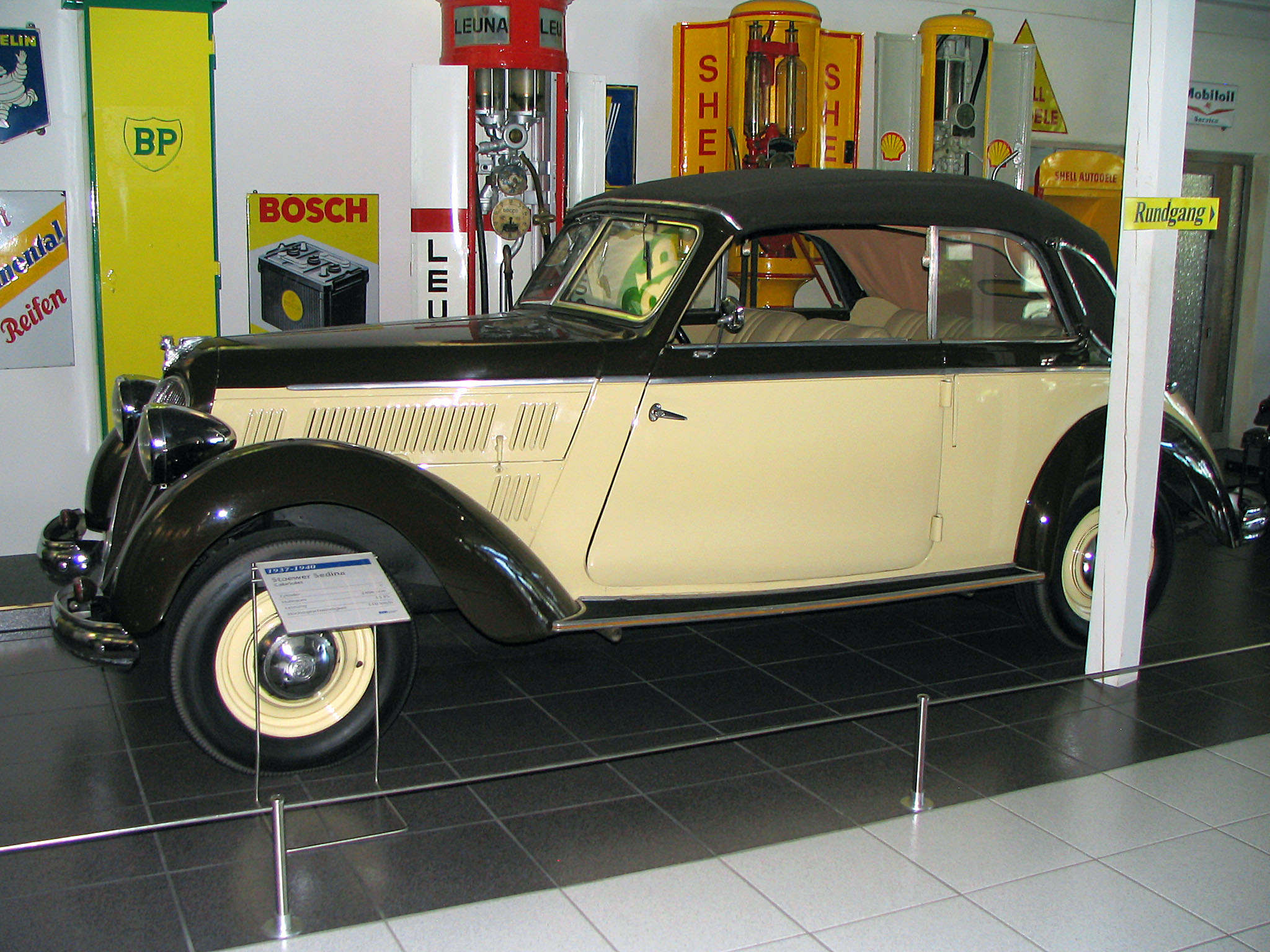
Stoewer Sedina 1937-1940

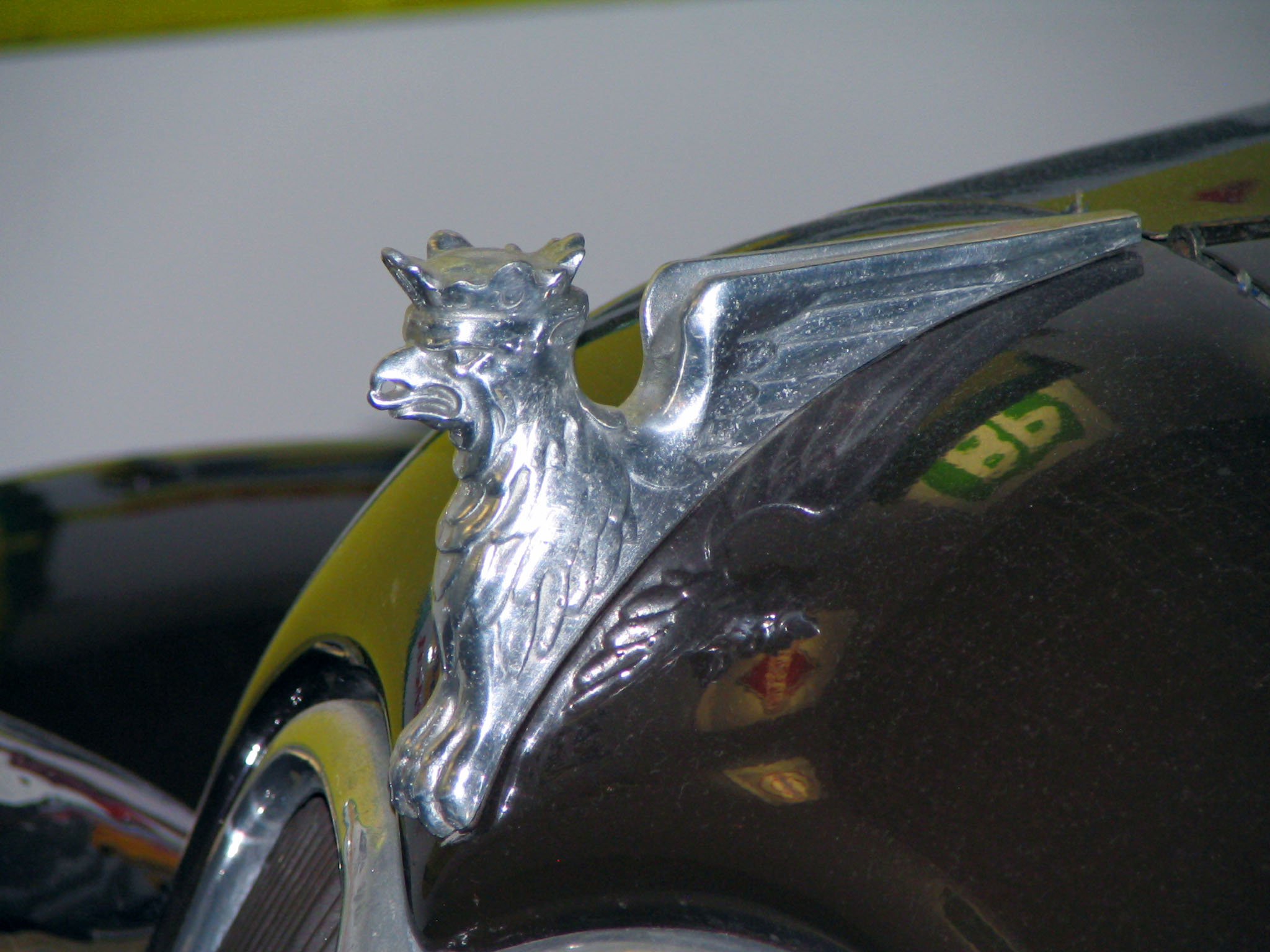
Hood ornament depicting the griffin of Pomerania.

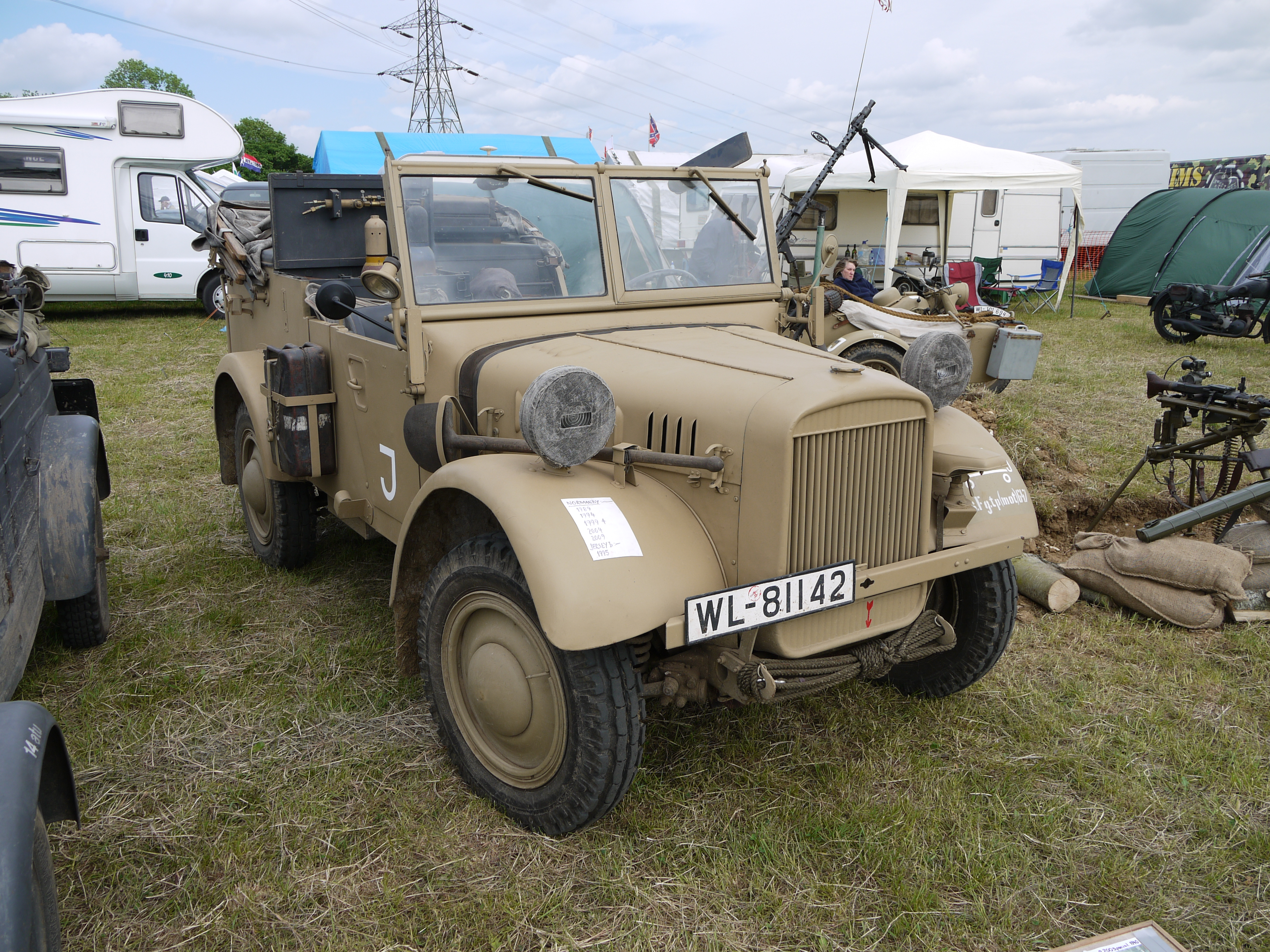
World War II Stoewer R200 (light off-road car, 1940–1943)

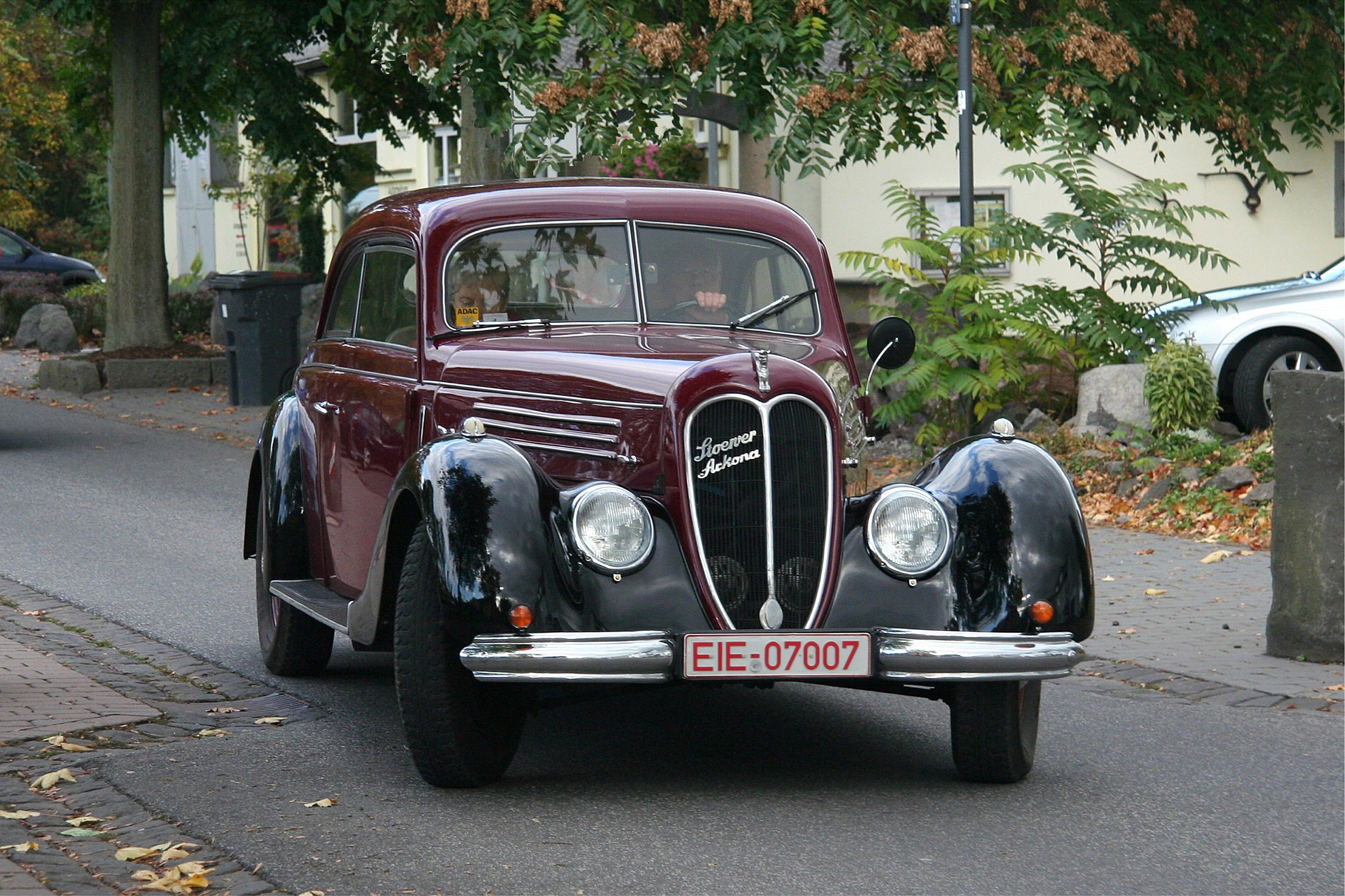
Stoewer Arkona Limousine (1940)

Type	Years Produced	Engine Type	Displacement	Power	Top Speed
Stoewer Motorcycle Four Wheels	1899	Electric motor	N/A	4.5 PS (3.3 kW)	39 km/h (24 mph)
Stoewer electric phaeton	1899	Electric motor	N/A	4.5 PS (3.3 kW)	46 km/h (29 mph)
Stower Motorwagen 6½ HP	1899-1902	straight-2	?	6.5 PS (4.8 kW)	17 km/h (11 mph)
10 PS	1901–1902	straight-2	1527 cc	18 PS (13.2 kW)	50 km/h (31 mph)
8/14 PS	1902–1905	straight-2	1527 cc	14 PS (10.3 kW)	50 km/h (31 mph)
20 PS	1904–1905	straight-4	7946 cc	45 PS (33 kW)	85 km/h (53 mph)
P4 (11/22 PS)	1905–1910	straight-4	3054 cc	22 PS (16,2 kW)	70 km/h (43 mph)
P2 (9/12 PS)	1906–1907	straight-2	2281 cc	16 PS (11,8 kW)	55 km/h (34 mph)
P4-1 (24/36 PS)	1906–1910	straight-4	5880 cc	40 PS (29 kW)	80 km/h (50 mph)
P6 (34/60 PS)	1906–1911	straight-6	8822 cc	60 PS (44 kW)	95 km/h (59 mph)
G4 (6/12 PS)	1907–1911	straight-4	1500 cc	12 PS (8,8 kW)	60 km/h (37 mph)
PK4 (11/20 PS)	1909–1912	straight-4	2544 cc	20 PS (14,7 kW)	70 km/h (43 mph)
C1 (6/18 PS)	1909–1915	straight-4	1546 cc	18 PS (13,2 kW)	70 km/h (43 mph)
B1 (6/16 PS)	1910–1912	straight-4	1556 cc	16 PS (11,8 kW)	65 km/h (40 mph)
B6 (9/22 PS)	1912–1914	straight-4	4900 cc	45 PS (33 kW)	95 km/h (59 mph)
C2 (10/28 PS)	1913–1914	straight-4	2412 cc	28 PS (20,6 kW)	75 km/h (47 mph)
C5 (6/18 PS)	1915–1919	straight-4	1546 cc	15 PS (11 kW)	70 km/h (43 mph)
D2 (6/18 PS)	1919–1920	straight-4	1593 cc	18 PS (13,2 kW)	70 km/h (43 mph)
D6 (19/55 PS)	1919–1921	straight-6	4960 cc	55 PS (40 kW)	100 km/h (62 mph)
D7 (42/120 PS)	1919–1921	straight-6	11160 cc	120 PS (88 kW)	160 km/h (99 mph)
D3 (8/24 PS)	1920–1923	straight-4	2120 cc	24 PS (17,6 kW)	70 km/h (43 mph)
D5 (12/36 PS)	1920–1923	straight-6	3107 cc	36 PS (26,5 kW)	80 km/h (50 mph)
D9 (8/32 PS)	1923–1924	straight-4	2290 cc	32 PS (23,5 kW)	90 km/h (56 mph)
D12 (12/45 PS)	1923–1924	straight-6	3107 cc	45 PS (33 kW)	100 km/h (62 mph)
D10 (10/50 PS)	1924–1925	straight-4	2580 cc	50 PS (37 kW)	120 km/h (75 mph)
D9V (9/32 PS)	1925–1927	straight-4	2290 cc	32 PS (23,5 kW)	90 km/h (56 mph)
D12V (13/55 PS)	1925–1928	straight-6	3386 cc	55 PS (40 kW)	100 km/h (62 mph)
F6 (6/30 PS)	1927–1928	straight-4	1570 cc	30 PS (22 kW)	70 km/h (43 mph)
8 Typ S 8 (8/45 PS)	1928	straight-8	1999 cc	45 PS (33 kW)	85 km/h (53 mph)
8 Typ G 14 (14/70 PS)	1928	straight-8	3633 cc	70 PS (51 kW)	100 km/h (62 mph)
8 Typ S 10 (10/50 PS)	1928–1930	straight-8	2464 cc	50 PS (37 kW)	90 km/h (56 mph)
Gigant G 15 K (15/80 PS)	1928–1933	straight-8	3974 cc	80 PS (59 kW)	110 km/h (68 mph)
Gigant G 15 (15/80 PS)	1928–1933	straight-8	3974 cc	80 PS (59 kW)	100 km/h (62 mph)
Repräsentant P 20 (20/100 PS)	1930–1933	straight-8	4906 cc	100 PS (74 kW)	120 km/h (75 mph)
Marschall M 12 (12/60 PS)	1930–1934	straight-8	2963 cc	60 PS (44 kW)	90 km/h (56 mph)
V 5	1931–1932	V4	1191 cc	25 PS (18,4 kW)	80 km/h (50 mph)
V 5 Sport	1931–1932	V4	1191 cc	30 PS (22 kW)	100 km/h (62 mph)
R 140	1932–1933	straight-4	1355 cc	30 PS (22 kW)	85–105 km/h (53–65 mph)
R 140	1933–1934	straight-4	1466 cc	30 PS (22 kW)	85–105 km/h (53–65 mph)
R 150	1934–1935	straight-4	1466 cc	35 PS (25,7 kW)	90–110 km/h
Greif V8	1934–1937	V8	2489 cc	55 PS (40 kW)	110 km/h (68 mph)
R 180	1935	straight-4	1769 cc	45 PS (33 kW)	105 km/h (65 mph)
Greif V8 Sport	1935–1937	V8	2489 cc	57 PS (42 kW)	120 km/h (75 mph)
Greif Junior	1936–1939	flat-4	1484 cc	34 PS (25 kW)	100 km/h (62 mph)
Sedina	1937–1940	straight-4	2406 cc	55 PS (40 kW)	110 km/h (68 mph)
Arkona	1937–1940	straight-6	3610 cc	80 PS (59 kW)	120–140 km/h (75–87 mph)

== See also ==
- Einheits-PKW der Wehrmacht
