= L28 =

L28 may refer to:

- 60S ribosomal protein L28
- Hanomag L 28, a German truck
- Helio L-28 Courier, an American utility aircraft
- HMS Hurworth (L28), a destroyer of the Royal Navy
- HMS Penzance (L28), a sloop of the Royal Navy
- Mitochondrial ribosomal protein L28
- Nissan L28 engine, an automobile engine
- NRO L-28, an American signals intelligence satellite
