= History of the diesel car =

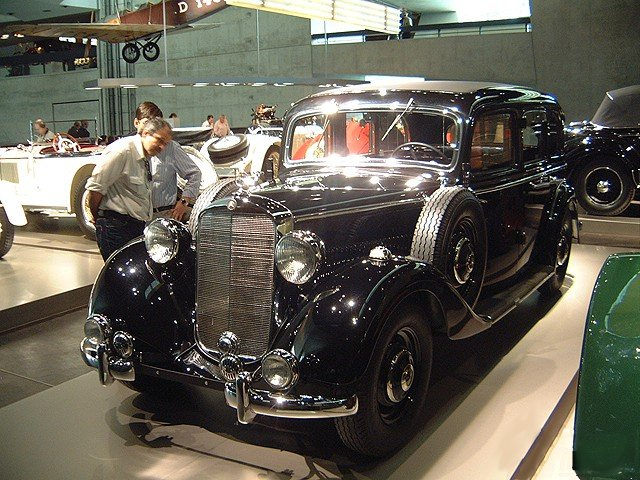
The Mercedes-Benz 260D (1936): one of the first diesel cars

Diesel engines began to be used in automobiles in the 1930s. Initially used mainly for commercial applications, they did not gain popularity for passenger travel until their development in Europe in the 1950s. After reaching a peak in popularity worldwide around 2015, in the aftermath of Dieselgate, the diesel car rapidly fell from favor with consumers and regulators.

== History ==
=== Early 20th century ===
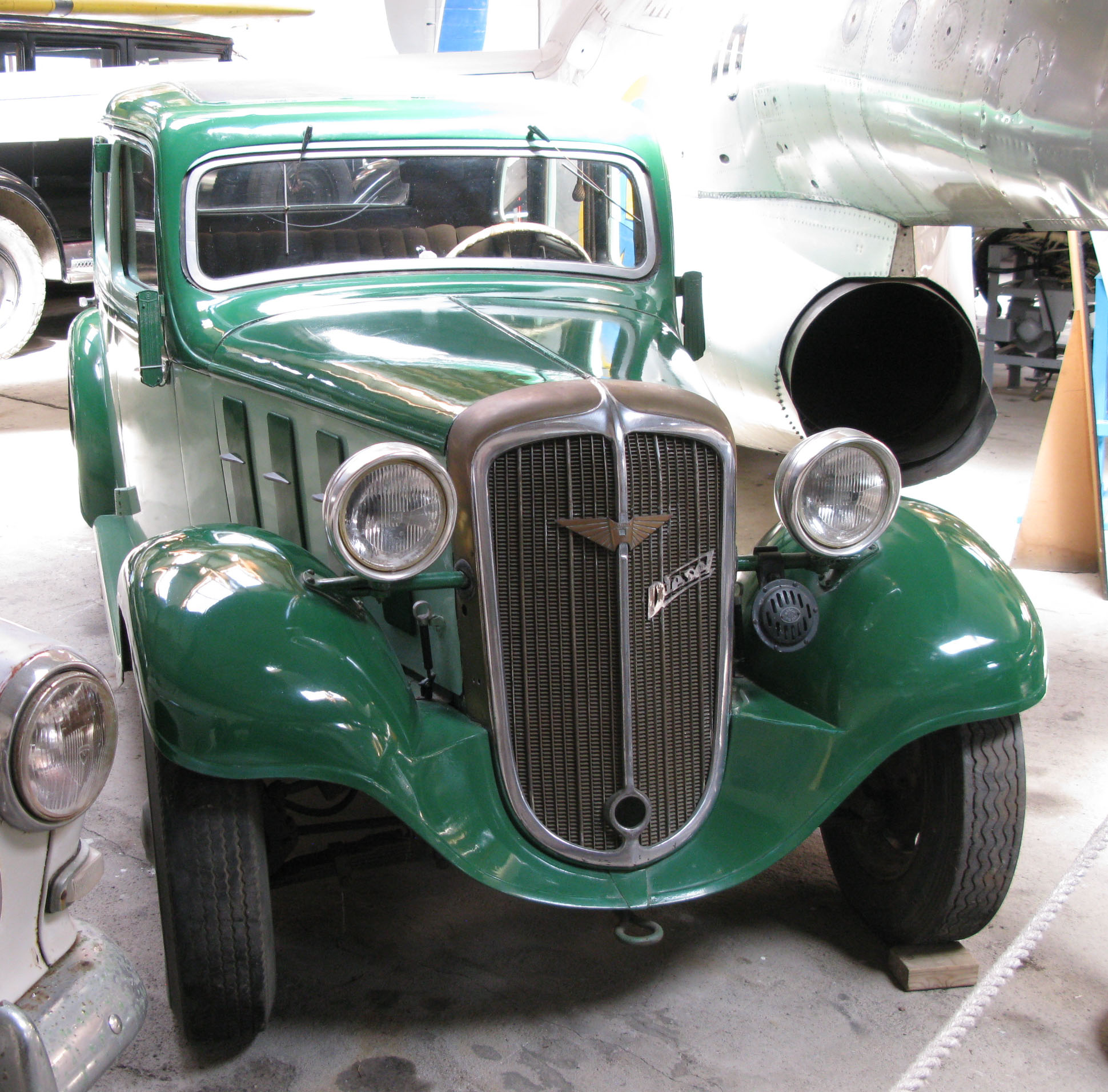
Hanomag Rekord Diesel

Production diesel car history started in 1933 with Citroën's Rosalie, which featured a diesel engine option (the 1,766 cc 11UD engine) in the Familiale (estate or station wagon) model. The Mercedes-Benz 260 D and the Hanomag Rekord were introduced soon thereafter, in 1936. Three years later, a modified Hanomag Rekord was used to set a world record for Diesel cars – it reached a top speed of 165 km/h (103 mph).

Immediately after World War II, and throughout the 1950s and 1960s, diesel-powered cars began to gain limited popularity, particularly for commercial applications, such as ambulances, taxis, and station wagons used for delivery work. Mercedes-Benz offered a continuous stream of diesel-powered taxis, beginning in 1949 with their 170 D powered by the OM 636 engine. The engine was carried over to the 170 D's successor – the 180 D – in 1953. Later, in 1958 their OM 621 engine was introduced in the 190 D. This 1.9 L engine produced 50 PS (37 kW) at 4,000/min.

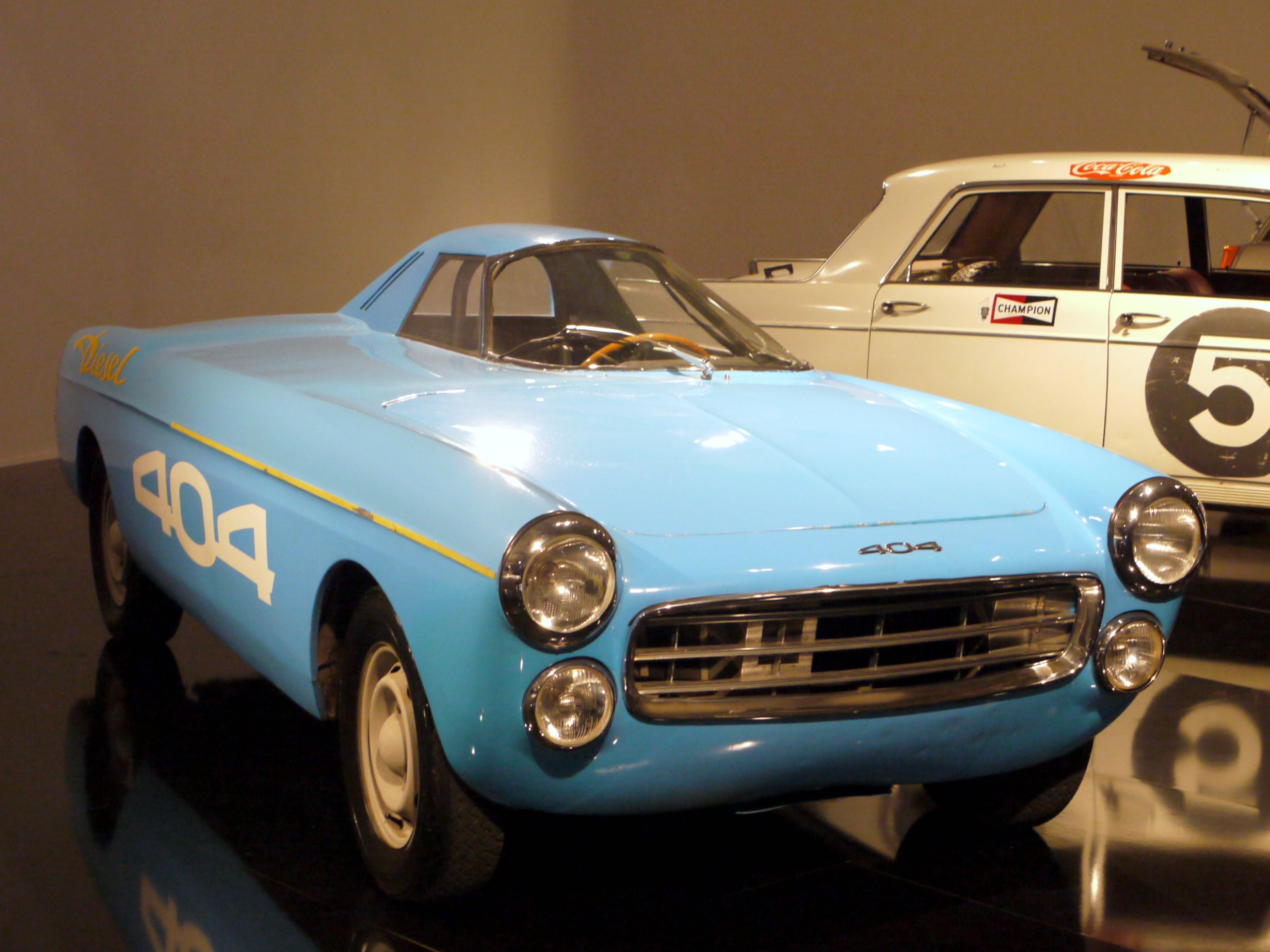
1965 Peugeot 404, modified to set a diesel speed record

Beginning in 1959, Peugeot offered the 403D with their TMD-85 four-cylinder engine of 1.8 L and 48 PS (35 kW), followed in 1962 by the 404D with the same engine. In 1964, the 404D became available with the improved XD88 four-cylinder engine of 2.0 L and 60 PS (44 kW). Other cars offered with diesel power during the 1950s included the Austin A60 Cambridge, Isuzu Bellel, Fiat 1400-A, Standard Vanguard, and, briefly, the Borgward Hansa.

In 1967, Peugeot introduced the world's first compact, high-speed diesel car, the Peugeot 204BD. Its 1.3 L XL4D engine produces 46 PS (34 kW) at 5,000 rpm. Following the 1970s oil crisis (1973 and 1979), Volkswagen introduced their first diesel car, the VW Golf, with a 1.5 L naturally aspirated indirect-injection engine which was a redesigned (dieselised) version of a gasoline engine. Mercedes-Benz tested turbodiesels in cars (e.g. by the Mercedes-Benz C111 experimental and record-setting vehicles) and the first production turbo diesel cars were introduced in 1978, being the 3.0 5-cylinder 115 hp (86 kW) Mercedes 300 SD, available only in North America, and the 2.5-litre 4-cylinder Peugeot 604.

A big step forward for mass-market diesel cars came in 1982 when PSA Peugeot Citroën introduced the XUD engine in the Peugeot 305, Peugeot 205 and Talbot Horizon. Diesel Car magazine considers it the class leading automotive diesel engine until the mid-1990s. The 1988 Citroën BX and the 1989 Peugeot 405 (both powered by the XUD engine) were among the earliest mass-market diesel cars able to achieve petrol engine standards. Diesel Car magazine said of the Citroën BX "We can think of no other car currently on sale in the UK that comes anywhere near approaching the BX Turbo's combination of performance, accommodation and economy".

German engine and car manufacturer BMW announced its first series-production diesel car, the 524td on the 1981 Frankfurt IAA. It was presented on the 1983 Frankfurt IAA with a 85 kW BMW M21 turbodiesel engine, giving it a top speed of 180 km/h. Ronan Glon considers it the fastest series-production diesel car of its time, being slightly faster than Daimler-Benz's OM 617-powered Mercedes-Benz W 123 300 D Turbodiesel. In 1986, BMW presented an electronic engine control unit for the M21 engine, being the first manufacturer to use this technology in a diesel passenger car.

Diesels carried a 2.5% share of the European Community market in 1973. Following the fuel crisis, this share increased to 4.1% in 1975. This more than doubled (to 8.6%) by 1980, and by 1983 diesels represented 11% of new car sales in the EU.

Motor vehicle diesel engines in North America have typically only been used in trucks, commercial vehicles and buses. Jeep had offered a Perkins Diesel option for its models in the early 1960s. Chrysler offered these engines as well – although mainly for the European market. Oldsmobile released a 350 in^{3} (5.7 L) V8 diesel engine, starting in 1977. Most Buick, Oldsmobile, Pontiac, Chevrolet and even Cadillac divisions of General Motors had received this engine by the 1980 model year, and continued to be sold until the engine was discontinued in 1985. The 350 in^{3} diesel engine proved to be unreliable and gave diesel cars a bad reputation in the United States.

=== 1990s-2015 diesel boom ===
Diesels steadily gained in acceptance with private buyers in the 1970s and into the 1990s. Having originally been mainly marketed to commercial users such as taxi drivers, European diesel sales increased steadily and reached 17.3 per cent of the overall European market by 1992. As a way to curb carbon dioxide emissions, sales of diesel vehicles in Europe were incentivized by the ACEA agreement. The peak of diesel popularity was reached in 2015, with 52% of new cars sold in Europe being diesel powered. The only other major car market where diesel cars were popular is India. Driven by cheap subsidized diesel fuel, diesel cars had a peak market share of 47% around 2012. Meanwhile, diesel market share in the United States and China remained low. In China, diesel cars are associated with heavy goods vehicles in consumer's minds, and environmental regulations kept diesel cars pricey to maintain. In South Korea, diesel cars became popular after the government eased emissions regulations in 2005.

==== Developments ====
The Fiat Croma TD-i.d. was the first turbo charged direct injection diesel in 1987 followed one year later by the Austin Rover Montego. The Audi 100, however, pioneered electronic control of the engine, while the Fiat and Austin had Bosch mechanically controlled injection. The electronic control of direct injection really made a difference in terms of emissions, refinement and power. All earlier generation car direct injection diesel engines benefit greatly from the use of biodiesel fuel, which reduces emissions and greatly improves refinement without engine modifications, provided they use compatible 'Viton' type rubber in their fuel systems.

The diesel car markets are the same ones who pioneered various developments (Mercedes-Benz, BMW, Peugeot/Citroën, Fiat, Alfa Romeo, Volkswagen Group). There were also small diesel engines produced in England by British Leyland and Perkins. For reasons of economy the petrol BMC "B" series engine was converted to diesel and produced in capacities of 1.5 and 1.8 litres. Perkins produced the 4.99, 4.107 and 4.108 engines all of which were extremely reliable. Later BL produced the five main bearing "O" series engine which was extremely strong. Petrol turbo variants could make 200HP and the engine was ideal for converting to a diesel. In fact, the 1988 Austin-Rover MDi unit (also known as the 'Perkins Prima') was developed by Perkins Engines of Peterborough, who have designed and built high-speed diesels since the 1930s. It is not easy to make a lightweight and powerful top class diesel engine owing to the immense pressures and heat produced within the engine. These problems were solved by VM Motori and the engines were used by Rover, Ford and Jeep. The interesting features of the engines were the tunnel-bore block and separate cylinder heads to allow for expansion.

In 1997, the first common rail diesel passenger car was introduced, the Alfa Romeo 156.

In 2004 Honda released their first diesel engine, the N22A branded as the i-CTDI, it first featured in the Honda Accord. The engine featured an aluminium block, DOHC chain driven valvetrain, common rail direct injection and variable geometry turbocharger.

In Spring 2005, Mercedes-Benz unveiled their first application of a mass-produced aluminum block diesel engine for passenger vehicles and commercial use. Aluminum was traditionally considered of inferior strength and temperature resistance to withstand diesel applications. Its first use was in 2006 model-year E-Class sedan, ML-class and GL-class vehicles. The 3.0 liter V6 engine is similar in weight (208 kg (459 lb)) to the five-cylinder it replaced, and considerably lighter than the in-line six-cylinder it also replaced.

==== V8 diesel engine ====
Oldsmobile offered the world's first V8 diesel engine for the passenger cars in 1978. Due to the cost-cutting measures, the Oldsmobile V8 diesel engine was a dismal failure and changed the American perspectives toward the diesel engines for many years. The V8 diesel engine wasn't offered again until 1999 when Mercedes-Benz introduced the 4-litre OM628 V8 diesel engine for its passenger vehicles. Audi followed in 2003 with its 4-litre V8 TDI. Mercedes-Benz ended the production in 2010, leaving Audi and Toyota (4.5-litre V8) to be the exclusive manufacturers of V8 diesels.

==== V10 and V12 diesel engine ====
Volkswagen Group introduced the world's first V10 and V12 diesel engines for the passenger vehicles. The 5-litre V10 was offered in Volkswagen Phaeton V10 TDI (2002–2006) and Volkswagen Touareg V10 TDI (2002–2010). The 6-litre V12 was exclusive to Q7 V12 TDI (2008–2012).

=== 2015-present: decline of diesel cars ===
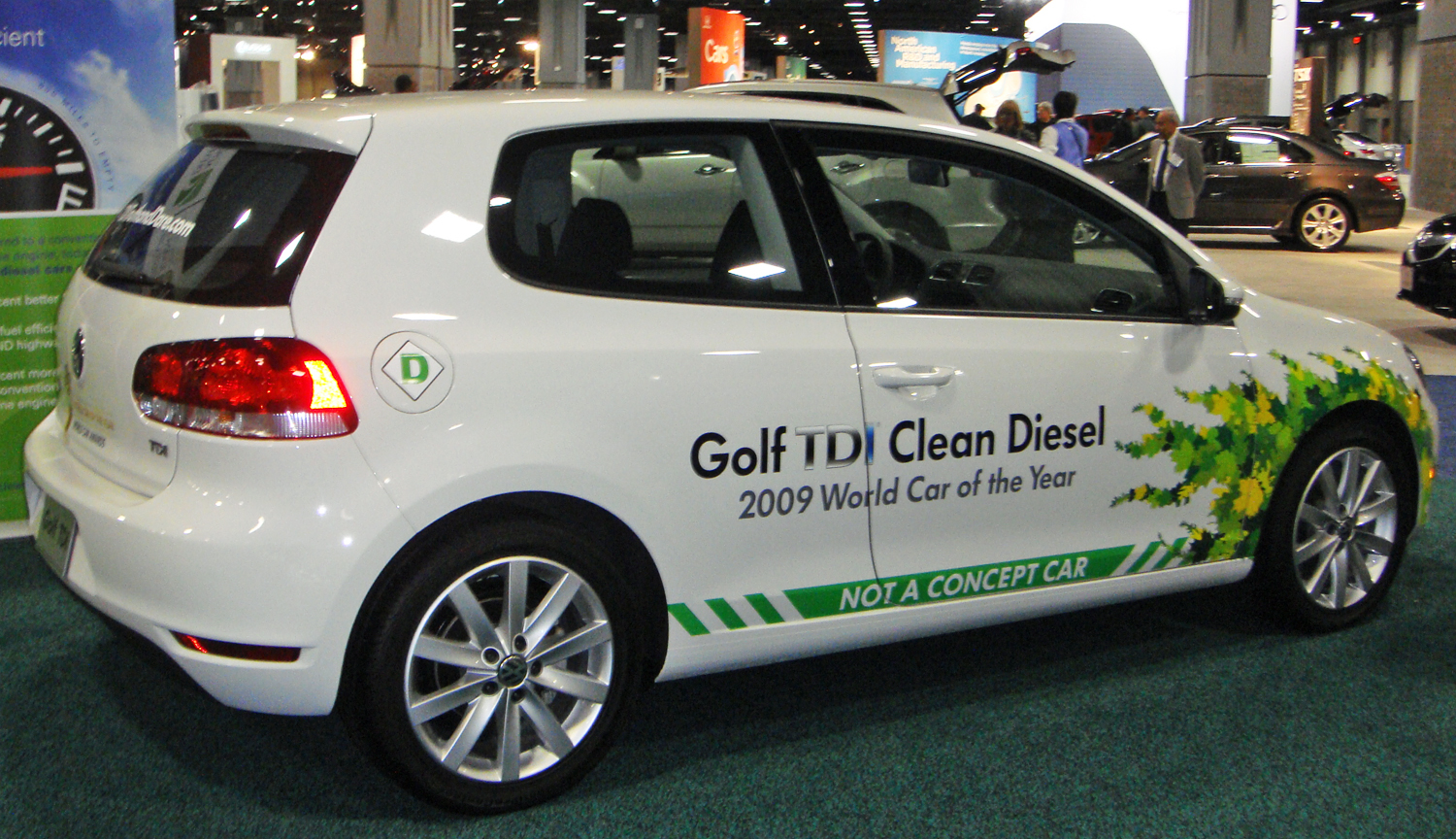
A 2010 Volkswagen Golf TDI with defeat device displaying "Clean Diesel" at the Detroit Auto Show

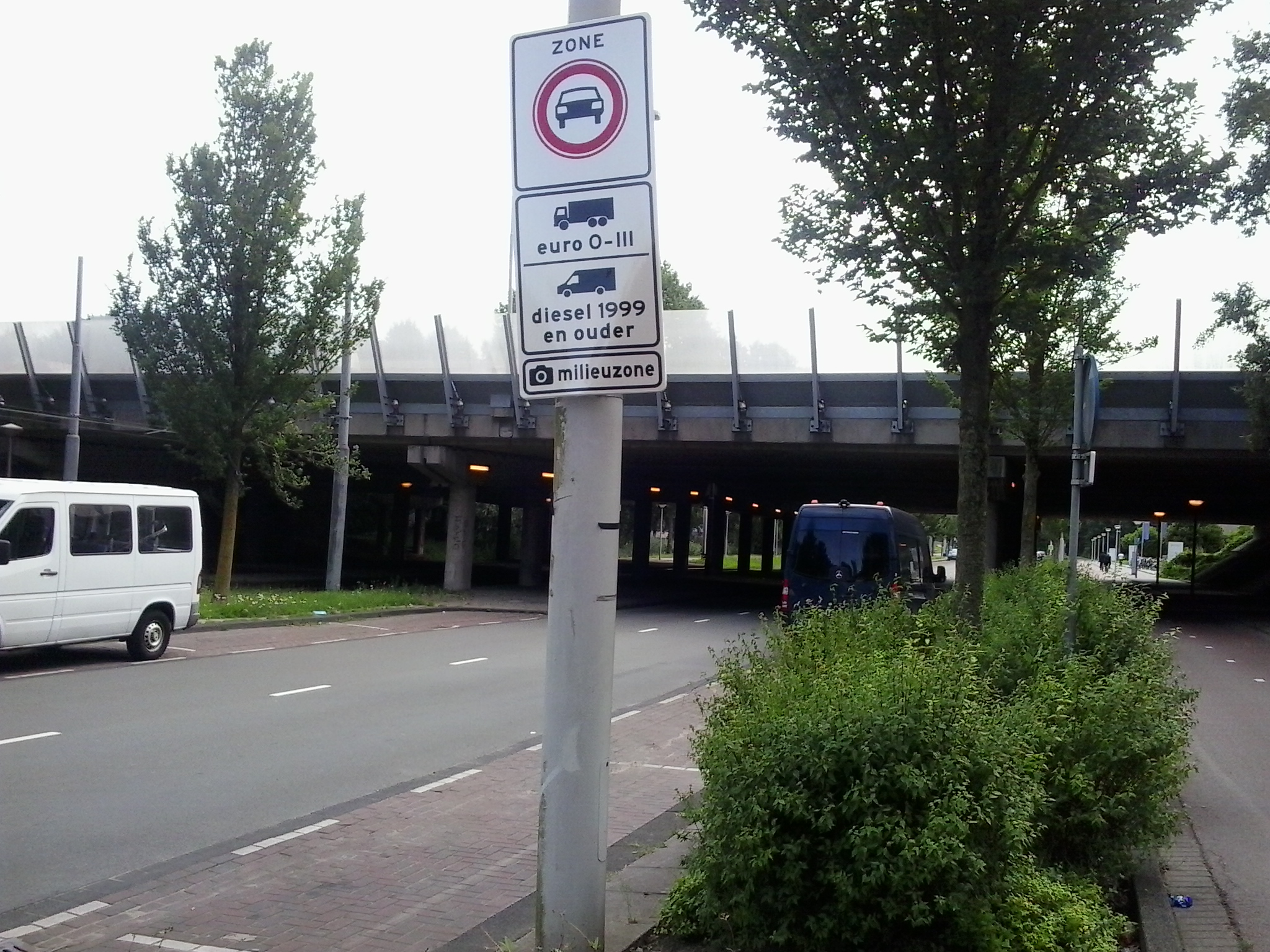
Emissions zone in Amsterdam prohibiting specifically older diesels vans

Since the numerous diesel emissions scandals of recent years, the most high profile of which was the Dieselgate scandal of 2015, it has been revealed that the levels of toxic emissions coming from diesel cars are higher and pose a greater risk to human health than those of vehicles powered by other means. In response, the image of the diesel car took a hit with consumers, resale values of diesel cars dropped and hundreds of cities in Europe started banning older diesel cars to curb air pollution, including Paris, Hamburg and Madrid. According to the German environment agency, diesel cars have a 39% share in German urban nitrogen dioxide pollution levels. In comparison to that, the share of diesel-powered busses and lorries is significantly lower. From a peak of 52% market share of new cars sold in Europe being diesel powered, by 2018, this number had declined to 36%. In September 2020, European market share of electric cars was higher than for diesel cars.

In India, BS6 emissions standard and bans on older diesel vehicles have also caused diesel market share to slip from 58% in 2013 to 29% in 2020.

In West-Africa, diesel cars are still the majority of vehicles on the road, as emissions standards are less stringent compared to the rest of the world and old diesel cars are allowed to be imported from the rest of the world. A 2018 report found that the majority of a sample of 160 cars exported from the Netherlands destined for West-Africa and Libya did not meet Euro IV (2005) emissions norms.

One exception to the decline of diesel cars is Japan, where diesel cars remained at 17% market share in 2023, and fall under "next-generation vehicles", a program to promote energy-efficient cars, subject to tax exemptions.

Several major car manufacturers have announced to end development of new diesel engines for cars, including Volvo in 2017, Mitsubishi in 2019 and Renault and Hyundai in 2021 However BMW will continue developing new 4 and 6-cylinder diesel engines, discontinuing only the 3-cylinder B37 diesel engine.

== Diesel engine vehicle racing ==
Although the weight and lower output of a diesel engine tend to keep them away from automotive racing applications, there are many diesels being raced in classes that call for them, mainly in truck racing and tractor pulling, as well in types of racing where these drawbacks are less severe, such as land speed record racing or endurance racing. Even diesel-engined dragsters exist, despite the diesel's drawbacks of weight and low peak rpm, specifications central to performance in this sport. However, in 2006, the new Audi R10 TDI LMP1 entered by Joest Racing became the first diesel-engined car to win the 24 Hours of Le Mans.

=== History ===
As early as 1931, Clessie Cummins installed his diesel in the Cummins "Diesel Special" race car, hitting 162 km/h (101 mph) at Daytona and 138 km/h (86 mph) at the Indianapolis 500 race, where Dave Evans became the first driver to complete the Indianapolis 500 without making a single pit stop, completing the full distance on the lead lap and finishing 13th, relying on torque and fuel efficiency to overcome weight and low peak power.

In 1933, a 1925 Bentley with a Gardner 4LW engine was the first diesel-engine car to take part in the Monte Carlo Rally when it was driven by Lord Howard de Clifford. It was the leading British car and finished fifth overall.

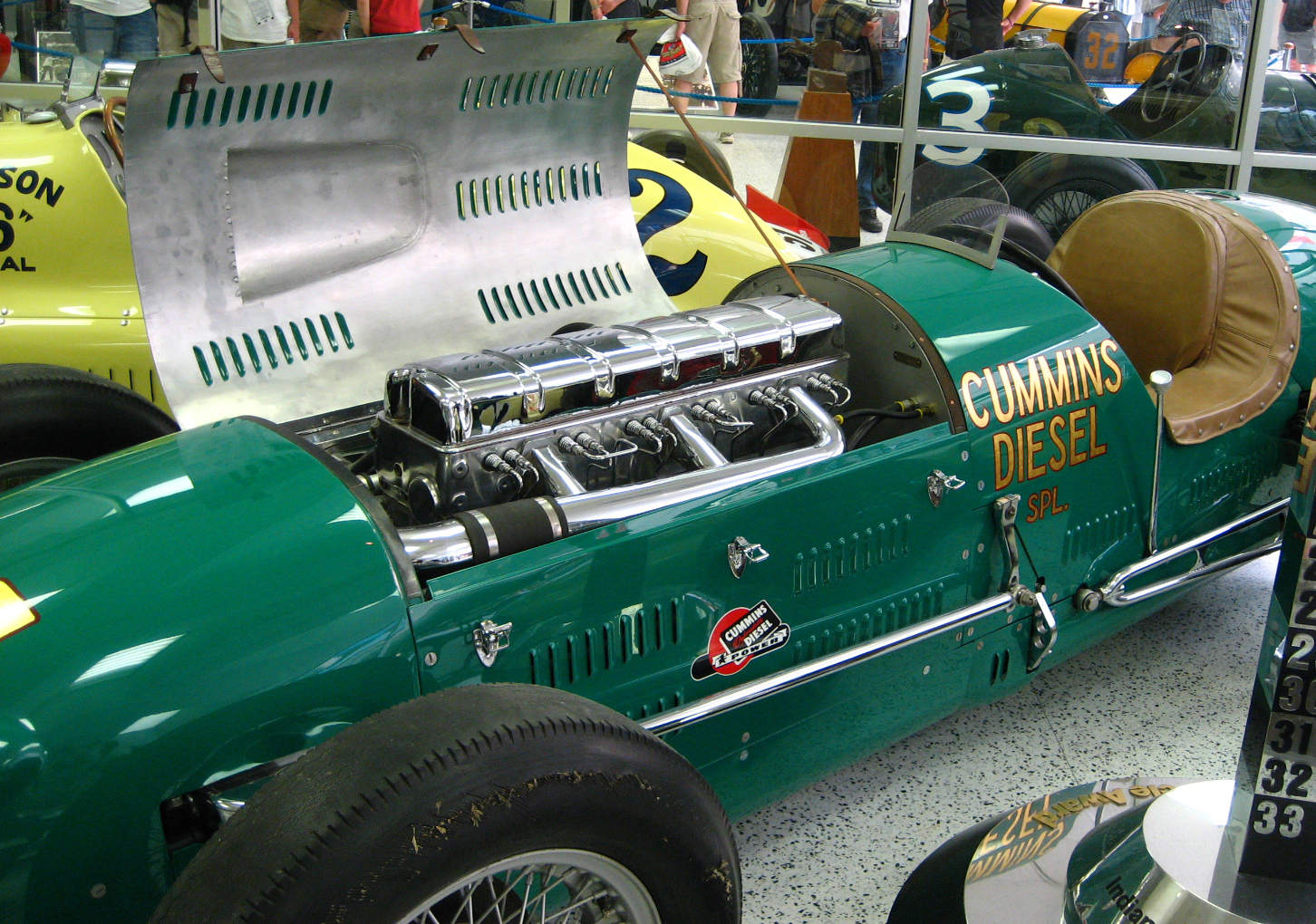
A 1950 "Cummins Diesel Special" Indianapolis 500 roadster

In 1952, Fred Agabashian in a Cummins diesel won the pole at the Indianapolis 500 race with a turbocharged 6.6-liter diesel car, setting a record for pole position lap speed, 222.108 km/h (138.012 mph). Don Cummins and his chief engineer Neve Reiners recognized that the low center of gravity of the flat engine configuration (designed to lie beneath the floor of a bus) plus the power advantage gained by the novel use of Elliott turbocharging would be a winning combination.

At the start, a slow pace lap (reportedly less than 150 km/h (93 mph)) apparently induced what is now referred to as "turbo lag" and badly hampered the throttle response of the Cummins Diesel. Although Agabashian found himself in eighth place before reaching the first turn, he moved up to fifth in a few laps and was running competitively (albeit well back in the field after a tire change) until the badly situated air intake of the car swallowed enough debris from the track to disable the turbocharger at lap 71; he finished 27th.

In the 1990s and rule makers supported the concept, BMW and Volkswagen raced diesel touring cars, with BMW winning the 1998 24 Hours Nürburgring with a 320d against other factory-entered diesel competition of VW and about 200 normally powered cars, mainly by being able to drive very long stints. Alfa Romeo even organized a racing series with their Alfa Romeo 147 1.9 JTD models.

In 2006, a BMW 120d repeated a similar result, scoring 5th in a field of 220 cars, many of them much more powerful, a significantly stronger competition than in 1998. The VW Dakar Rally race Touareg for 2005 and 2006 are powered by their own line of TDI engines in order to challenge for the first overall diesel win there.

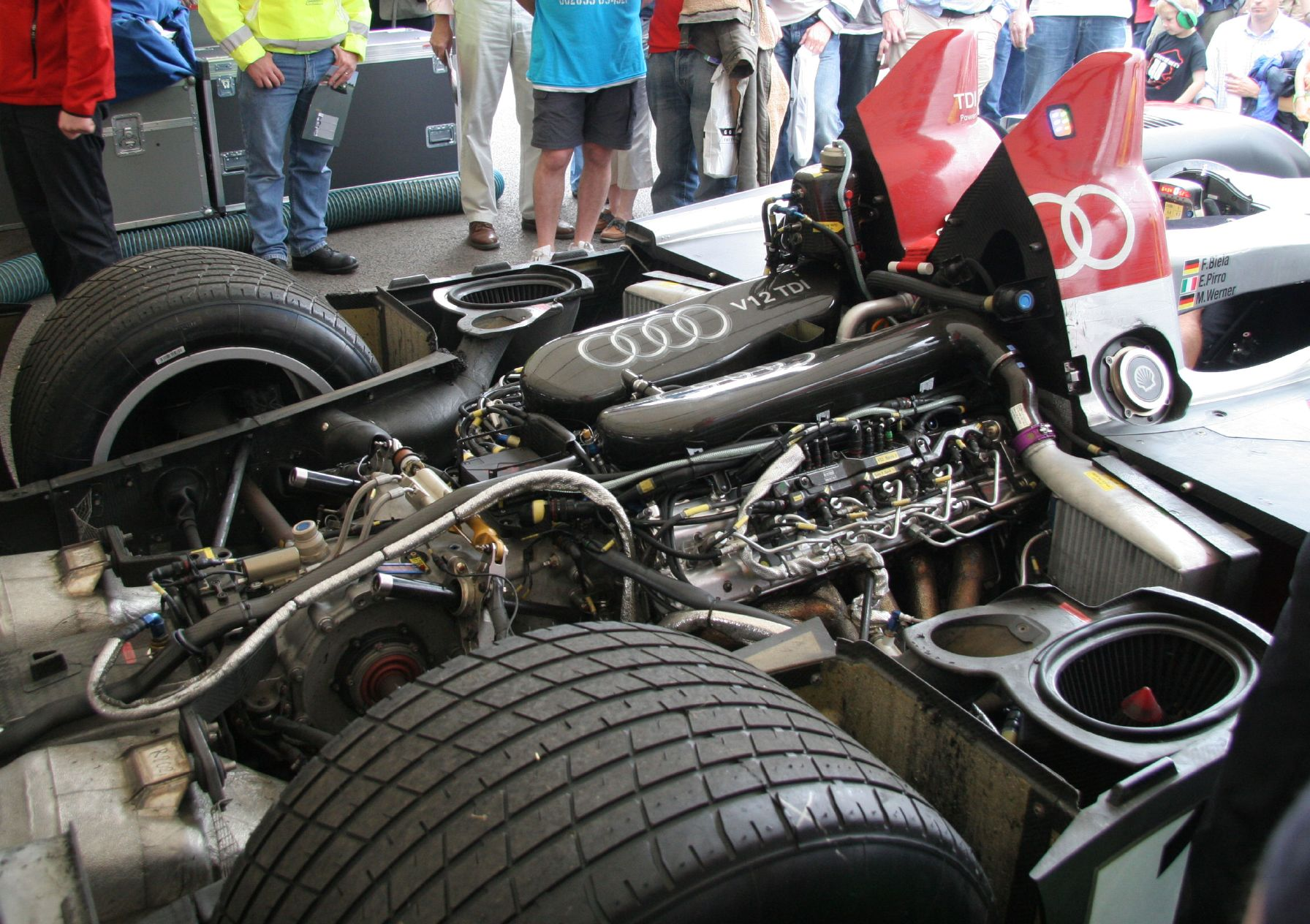
The diesel engine of Audi's 2007 24 Hours of Le Mans-winning R10 TDI

Meanwhile, the five time 24 Hours of Le Mans winner Audi R8 race car was replaced by the Audi R10 TDI in 2006, which is powered by a 650 hp (485 kW) and 1,100 N⋅m (810 lb⋅ft) V12 TDI common rail diesel engine, mated to a 5-speed gearbox, instead of the 6 used in the R8, to handle the extra torque produced. The gearbox is considered the main problem, as earlier attempts by others failed due to the lack of suitable transmissions that could stand the torque long enough.

After winning the 12 Hours of Sebring in 2006 with their diesel-powered Audi R10 TDI LMP1, Audi obtained the overall win at the 2006 24 Hours of Le Mans, too. This is the first time a sports car could compete for overall victories with diesel fuel against cars powered with regular fuel or methanol and bio-ethanol. However, the significance of this is slightly lessened by the fact that the ACO/ALMS race rules encourage the use of alternative fuels such as diesel. The winning car also bettered the post-1990 course configuration lap record by 1, at 380 laps. However, this fell short of the all-time distance record set in 1971 by over 200 kilometres (120 mi). Audi again triumphed at Sebring in 2007. It had both a speed and fuel economy advantage over the entire field including the Porsche RS Spyders, gasoline powered purpose-built race cars. Audi's diesels won again the 2007 24 Hours of Le Mans, against competition coming from the Peugeot 908 HDi FAP diesel powered racer.

In 2006, the JCB Dieselmax broke the diesel land speed record posting an average speed of over 328 mph (528 km/h). The vehicle used "two diesel engines that have a combined total of 1,500 horsepower (1120 kilowatts). Each is a 4-cylinder, 4.4-liter engine used commercially in a backhoe loader."

In the 2008 BTCC, Jason Plato and Darren Turner raced factory sponsored SEAT Leon TDI with some success against a variety of gasoline powered competitors.

== See also ==
- Diesel cycle
- Diesel generator
- Diesel motorcycle
- Dieselisation
- Forced induction
- Gasoline direct injection
- Hesselman engine
- History of the internal combustion engine
- Hybrid power source
- Indirect injection
- Junkers Jumo 205—The more successful of the first series of production diesel aircraft engines.
- List of countries banning fossil fuel vehicles
- Napier Deltic—a high-speed, lightweight diesel engine used in fast naval craft and some railway locomotives.
- SVO—Straight Vegetable Oil—alternative fuel for diesel engines.
- Wärtsilä-Sulzer RTA96-C—world's most powerful, most efficient and largest diesel engine.
- WVO—Waste Vegetable Oil—filtered, alternative fuel for diesel engines.
