= Ribosomal L28e protein family =

Ribosomal_L28e

Identifiers
- Symbol: Ribosomal_L28e
- Pfam: PF01778
- InterPro: IPR002672
Available protein structures:
- PDB: IPR002672 PF01778 (ECOD; PDBsum)
- AlphaFold: IPR002672; PF01778

Ribosomal L28e protein family is a family of evolutionarily related proteins. Members include 60S ribosomal protein L28.

Ribosomes are the particles that catalyse mRNA-directed protein synthesis in all organisms. The codons of the mRNA are exposed on the ribosome to allow tRNA binding. This leads to the incorporation of amino acids into the growing polypeptide chain in accordance with the genetic information. Incoming amino acid monomers enter the ribosomal A site in the form of aminoacyl-tRNAs complexed with elongation factor Tu (EF-Tu) and GTP. The growing polypeptide chain, situated in the P site as peptidyl-tRNA, is then transferred to aminoacyl-tRNA and the new peptidyl-tRNA, extended by one residue, is translocated to the P site with the aid the elongation factor G (EF-G) and GTP as the deacylated tRNA is released from the ribosome through one or more exit sites. About 2/3 of the mass of the ribosome consists of RNA and 1/3 of protein. The proteins are named in accordance with the subunit of the ribosome which they belong to - the small (S1 to S31) and the large (L1 to L44). Usually they decorate the rRNA cores of the subunits.

Many of ribosomal proteins, particularly those of the large subunit, are composed of a globular, surfaced-exposed domain with long finger-like projections that extend into the rRNA core to stabilise its structure. Most of the proteins interact with multiple RNA elements, often from different domains. In the large subunit, about 1/3 of the 23S rRNA nucleotides are at least in van der Waals contact with protein, and L22 interacts with all six domains of the 23S rRNA. Proteins S4 and S7, which initiate assembly of the 16S rRNA, are located at junctions of five and four RNA helices, respectively. In this way proteins serve to organise and stabilise the rRNA tertiary structure. While the crucial activities of decoding and peptide transfer are RNA based, proteins play an active role in functions that may have evolved to streamline the process of protein synthesis. In addition to their function in the ribosome, many ribosomal proteins have some function 'outside' the ribosome.

Ribosomal protein L28e forms part of the 60S ribosomal subunit. This family is found in eukaryotes. In rat there are 9 or 10 copies of the L28 gene. The L28 protein contains a possible internal duplication of 9 residues.

== Examples ==
Human genes encoding protein containing this domain include RPL28.
