= Hanomag =

Former German vehicle producer

Coordinates: 52°21′25″N 9°42′28″E

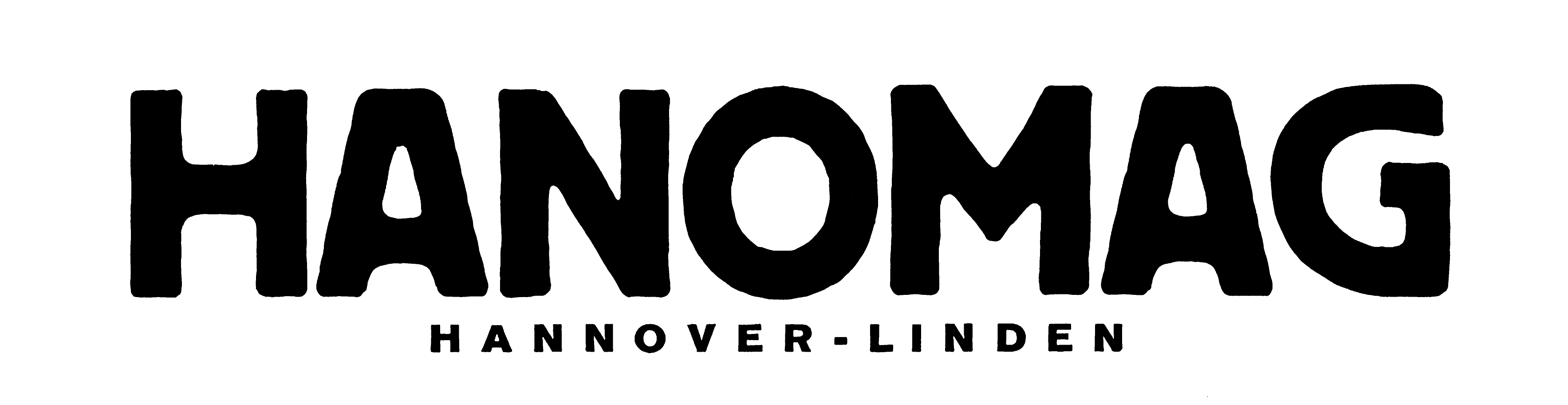
- Type: Aktiengesellschaft
- Industry: Locomotives, Tractors, Trucks, Motorcycles, Construction Machinery, Cars etc
- Founded: 1871
- Defunct: 1984, 1990 & 2002 (various branches)
- Fate: Merger, Dissolution
- Headquarters: Hanover, Germany
- Area served: worldwide
- Key people: Bethel Strousberg; Horst-Dieter Esch Alfred; Massey Ferguson; Helmut Gassmann; Günter Papenburg
- Parent: Komatsu (Since 1990)
- Website: www.komatsu.eu/en/company/komatsu-germany-construction

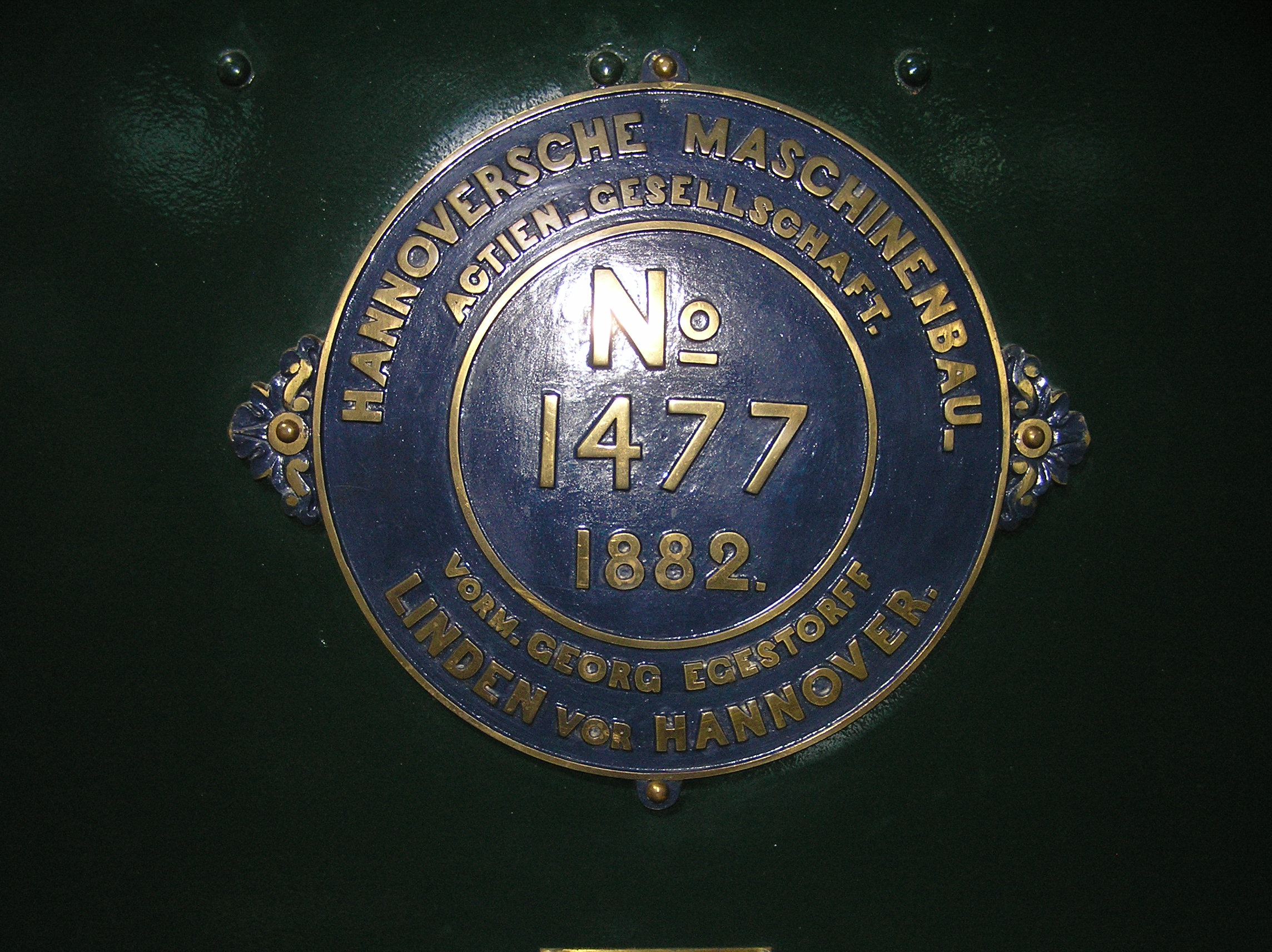
Builder's Plate of Hannoversche Maschinenbau locomotive No 1477 of 1882 0-6-0 at the Finnish Railway Museum

Hanomag (Hannoversche Maschinenbau AG, German pronunciation: [ˈhano:mɐx]) was a German producer of steam locomotives, tractors, trucks and military vehicles in Hanover. Hanomag first achieved international fame by delivering numerous steam locomotives to Finland, Romania and Bulgaria before World War I and making of first tractor Hanomag R26 in 1924 in Germany. In 1925, they added automobiles to their line, additionally moving in 1931 into the production of construction machinery. Since 1989, the company has been part of the Komatsu company.

== History ==
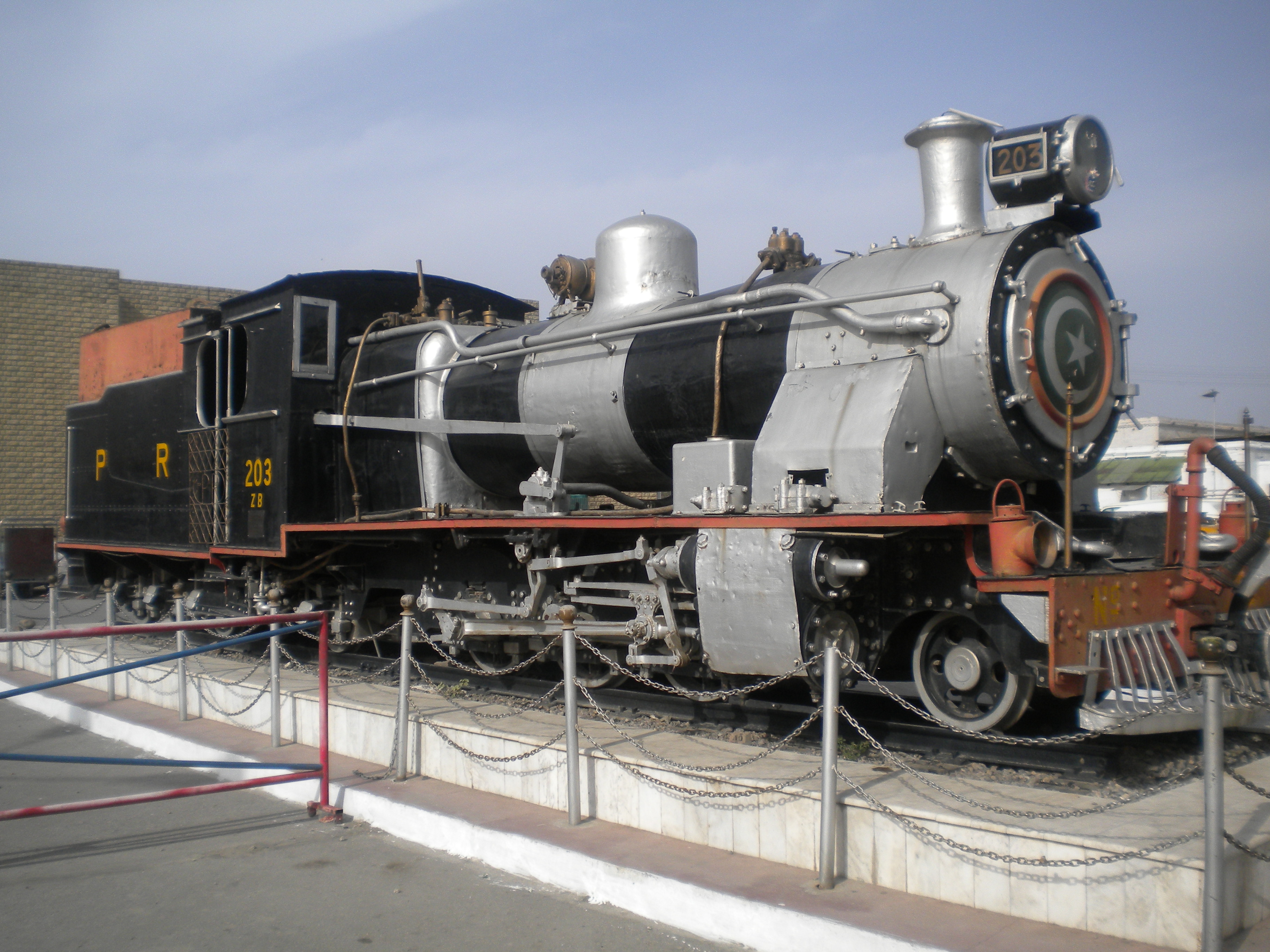
Hanomag Railway Engine built in 1932

The company dates back to 1835 when Georg Egestorff founded in Linden near Hanover a company called Eisen-Giesserey und Maschinenfabrik Georg Egestorff to build small steam engines. They soon started making farm machinery and in 1846 built their first railway locomotive for the Royal Hanoverian State Railways. By 1870 they had made 500 locomotives and in 1871 changed their name to Hannoversche Maschinenbau Actien-Gesellschaft vorm. Georg Egestorff, Linden vor Hannover. Road vehicles followed when in 1905 they received a contract for steam wagons for the German army.

=== Tractors ===
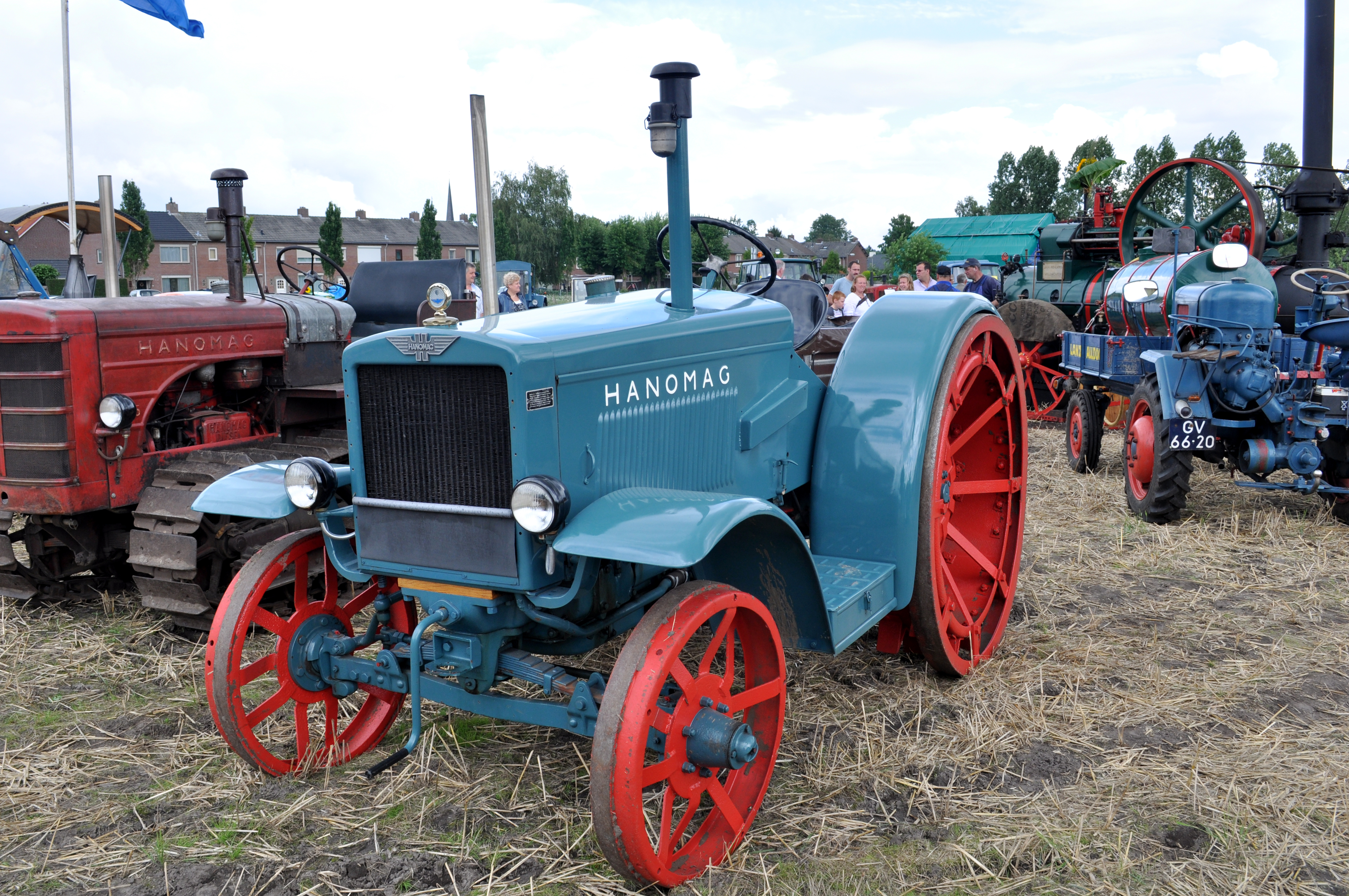

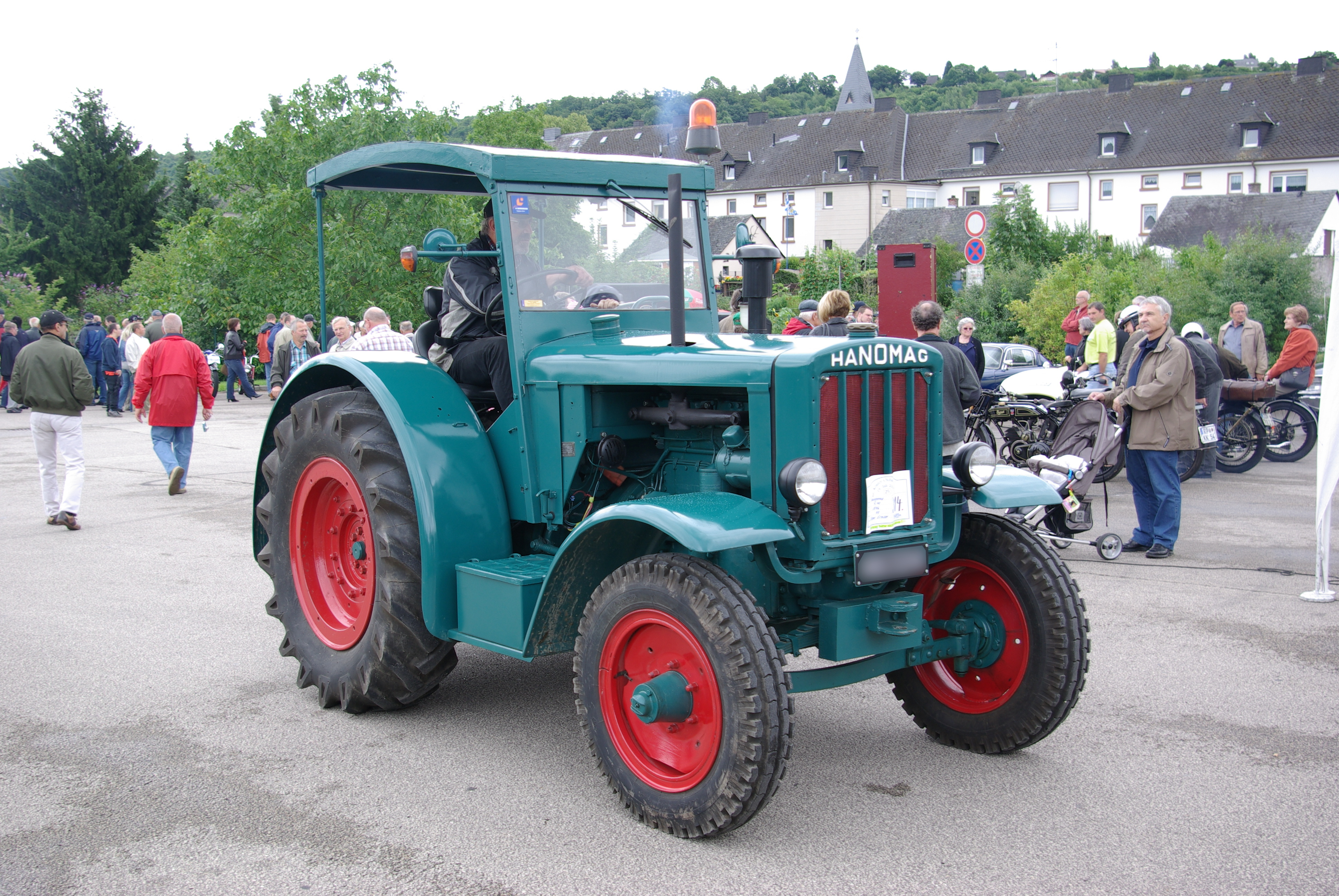
1946

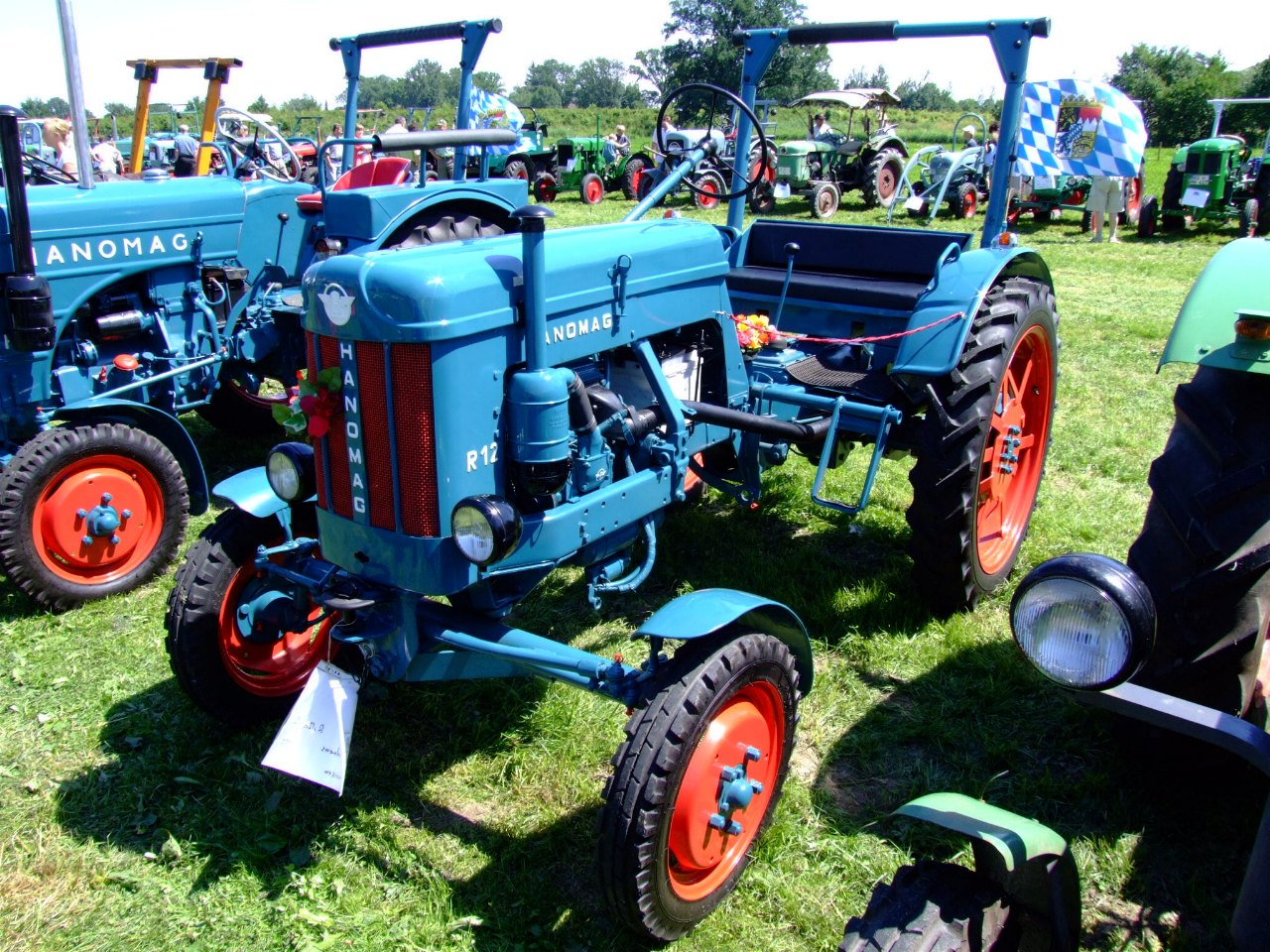

In 1912 Hanomag started the production of ploughs with up to 80-horsepower (59 kW) benzene engines. In 1924, the first farm tractor WD 26 (WD) with a 26-horsepower (19 kW) four-cylinder benzene engine was presented to the market. In 1931, the first diesel tractor RD 36 with a 36-horsepower (26 kW) four-cylinder engine, and 5.2 litres (320 cubic inches) of capacity was made. Hanomag was the market leader in 1939 and the early 1950s. In 1951, a series of new tractors were developed, based on a modular system with 2-,3-, and 4-cylinder engines. From 1962 until the cessation of production in 1971, only four-stroke diesel tractors were built.

From 1912 to 1971, more than 250,000 machines from 12 to 92 horsepower (9 to 68 kW) left the factory halls in Linden. In addition, there were manufacturing facilities in Argentina and license agreements with Spanish industrialists.

=== Cars ===
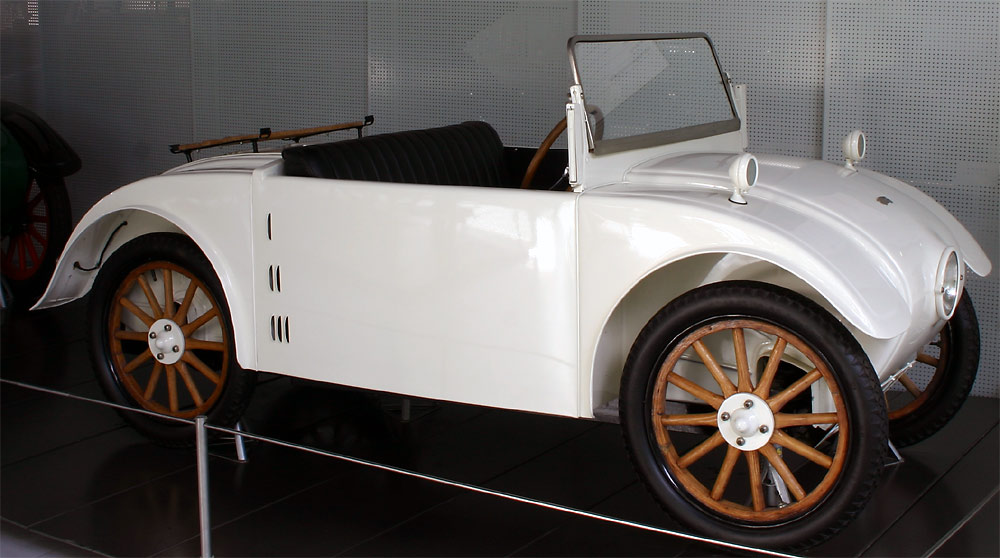
Hanomag 2/10PS "Kommissbrot"

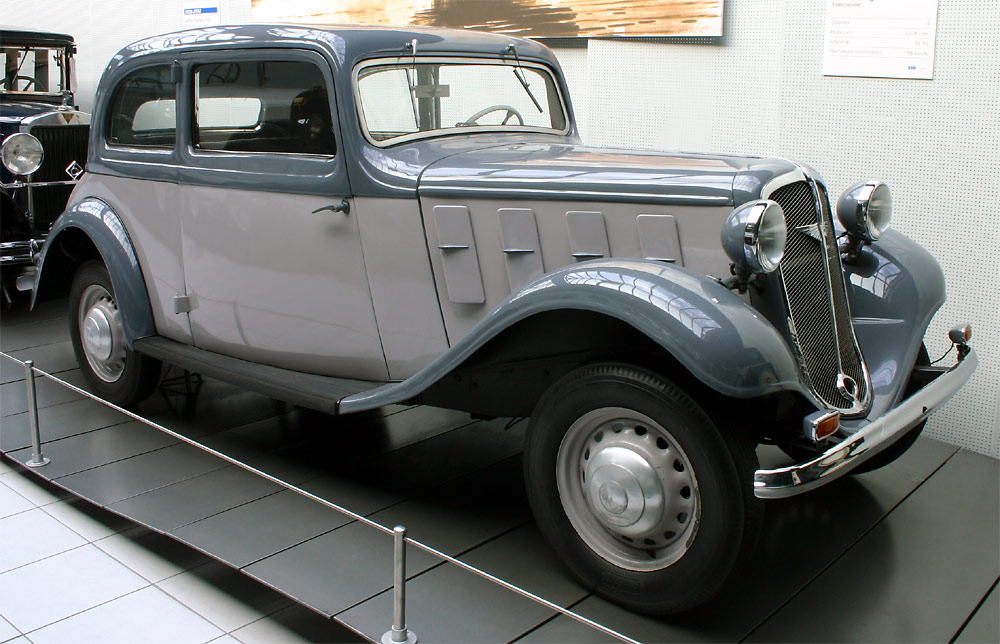
Hanomag 1.5-litre (92-cubic-inch) "Rekord"

By the 1920s, the market for steam road vehicles was in terminal decline, and Hanomag looked to cars as the future, particularly economy models. In 1925, they launched the Hanomag 2/10, a 370 kg (816 lb) open two-seater with a mid-mounted 500-cubic-centimetre (31-cubic-inch) single-cylinder water-cooled engine. Named Zweisitzer Limousine (two-seat limousine) by the company, its rounded front and rear gained it the nickname Kommissbrot for its resemblance to a loaf of Army bread. Although made in large numbers, 15,775 in total, it did not make much money for the company and in the late 1920s the railway locomotive division was sold to Henschel & Son of Kassel.

A more conventional car, the 3/16PS, and the first diesel-engined tractors, came in 1928, taking the company back into profit. Hanomag were badly hurt by the drop in trade in 1929 and built a large stock of unsold vehicles. Things improved in 1930 and the company got 14 per cent of the domestic car market, second place behind Opel, but in 1931 a new crisis came when the banks called in a loan. The factory was mortgaged to Hannover City and the Vereinigte Stahlwerke trust and the company relaunched as Hanomag Automobil und Schlepperbau GmbH.

For 1932, a new small car, the 1.1 Litre, renamed the Garant in 1934, was announced and sold well, allowing two-shift working to be introduced and it was joined by the larger 1.5 litre Rekord (a name later used by Opel) in 1933, with independent front suspension. A diesel Rekord was shown at the 1936 Berlin Motor Show.

The Hanomag 1.3 litre was introduced in 1939 and had unitary body, an innovative feature for that time. It was studied by Volvo engineers and influenced the construction of the Volvo PV 444 passenger car.

=== Military vehicles ===
During World War II, the car plant made military vehicle engines, a military version of their heavy tractor renamed the SS-100, and half track troop carriers. The Hanomag 20 B, a four-wheel-drive Small Unit-Personnel Carrier was produced from 1937 until 1940 (circa 2000 built) under the parentage of Stoewer (as the R180, R200 and Type 40). Capacity problems by Stoewer resulted in co-production by both BMW (as the 325) and Hanomag. Together, the three manufacturers made about 10,000 units. The special four-wheel-steering system was fitted on most models. Operating a "lock-level" between the front seats, made the steerable rear axle turn sideways to a certain angle.

The single most important and iconic military vehicle to be designed and built by Hanomag during World War II was the Sd.Kfz. 251 half-track (commonly called simply "the Hanomag" but this has been questioned, and may have been only a postwar label. German officers referred to them as SPW 'Schützenpanzerwagen, or armored infantry vehicle' in their daily orders and memoirs.) with a total production numbering just over 15,000. Built to protect and transport the Panzergrenadier mechanized infantry forces, it was by far the most common German armoured troop-carrying vehicle of World War II, and a direct precursor to the armoured personnel carriers of today. In comparison to the most common Allied half-track of the war, the M3 Half-track, the Sd.Kfz. 251 was slower and lower-powered, but with thicker, sloping side armour provided better protection; the flat-sided M3 was, at one point, panned as the "Purple Heart Box" for being unable to stop 7.92mm Mauser bullets at close range, while the Hanomag's sloping side armour deflected Allied bullets with no similar issue.

Post-war production resumed, making trailer units, followed by tractors and, in 1949, a 1.5 ton truck. Although prototypes were made, no cars were produced postwar. Rudolph Hiller, who had been president of Phänomen trucks, joined the board and restructured the company by arranging for it to join the Rheinstahl consortium in 1952.

=== Merger and split ===
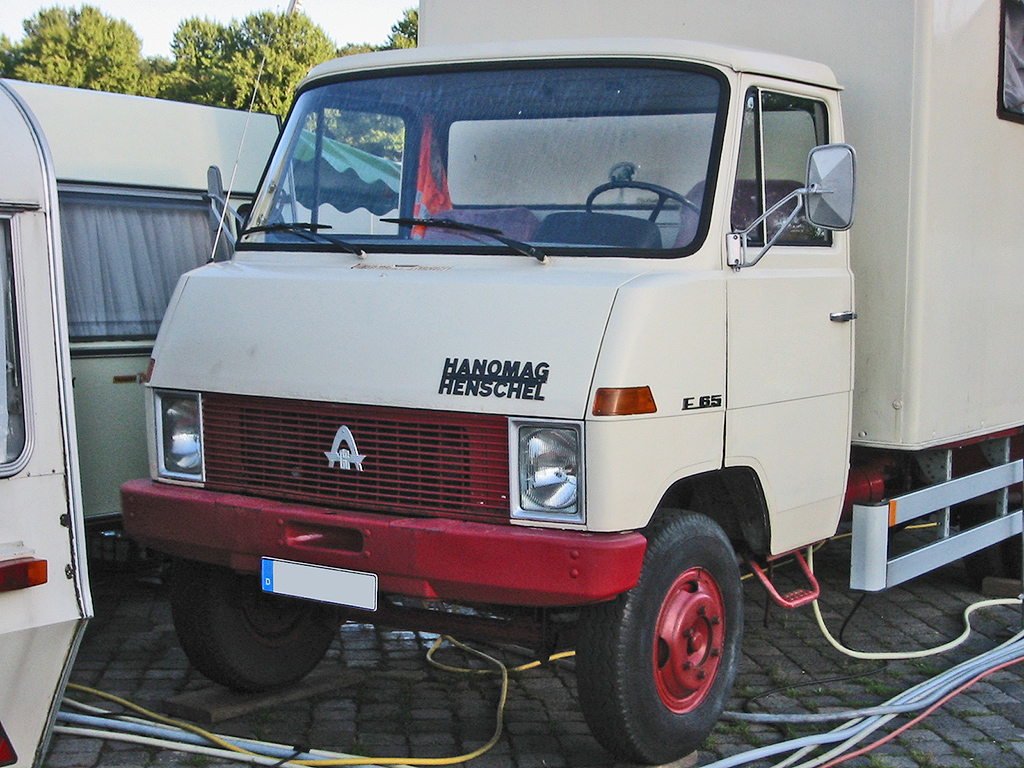
Hanomag-Henschel F 65

In 1964, Rheinstahl took over Henschel-Werke and in a reverse of history the company was merged with Hanomag.

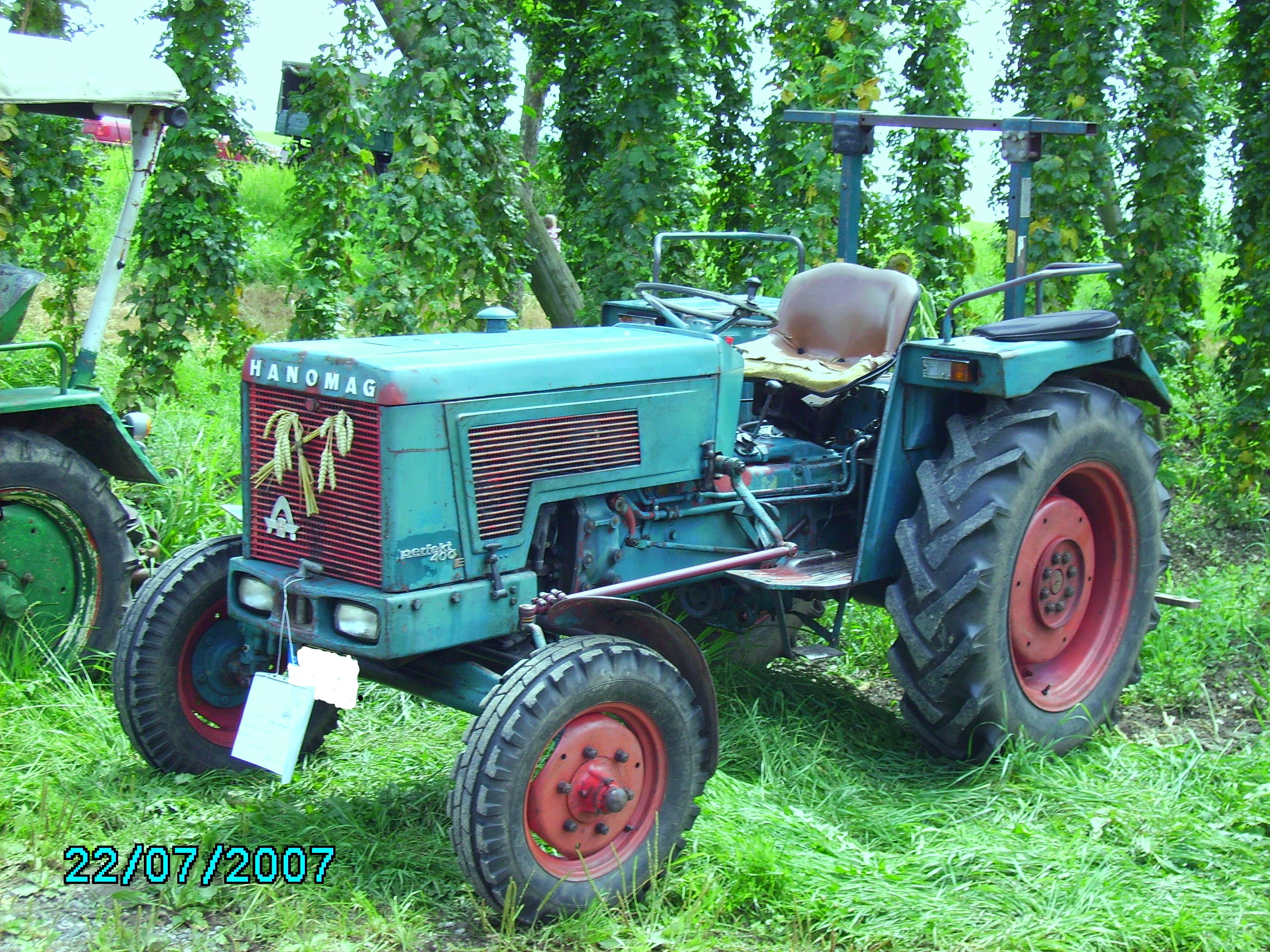
Hanomag Perfekt 400e

The farm tractor operation was sold to Massey Ferguson and in 1969 the truck making division of Hanomag-Henschel went to Daimler Benz, leaving the Hanover works making earth-moving machinery for Massey Ferguson.

In 1989, the world's second largest construction machine manufacturer, Komatsu, bought a share of Hanomag AG and, since 2002, Komatsu Hanomag GmbH has been a 100% subsidiary of the global company.

=== Construction machinery ===
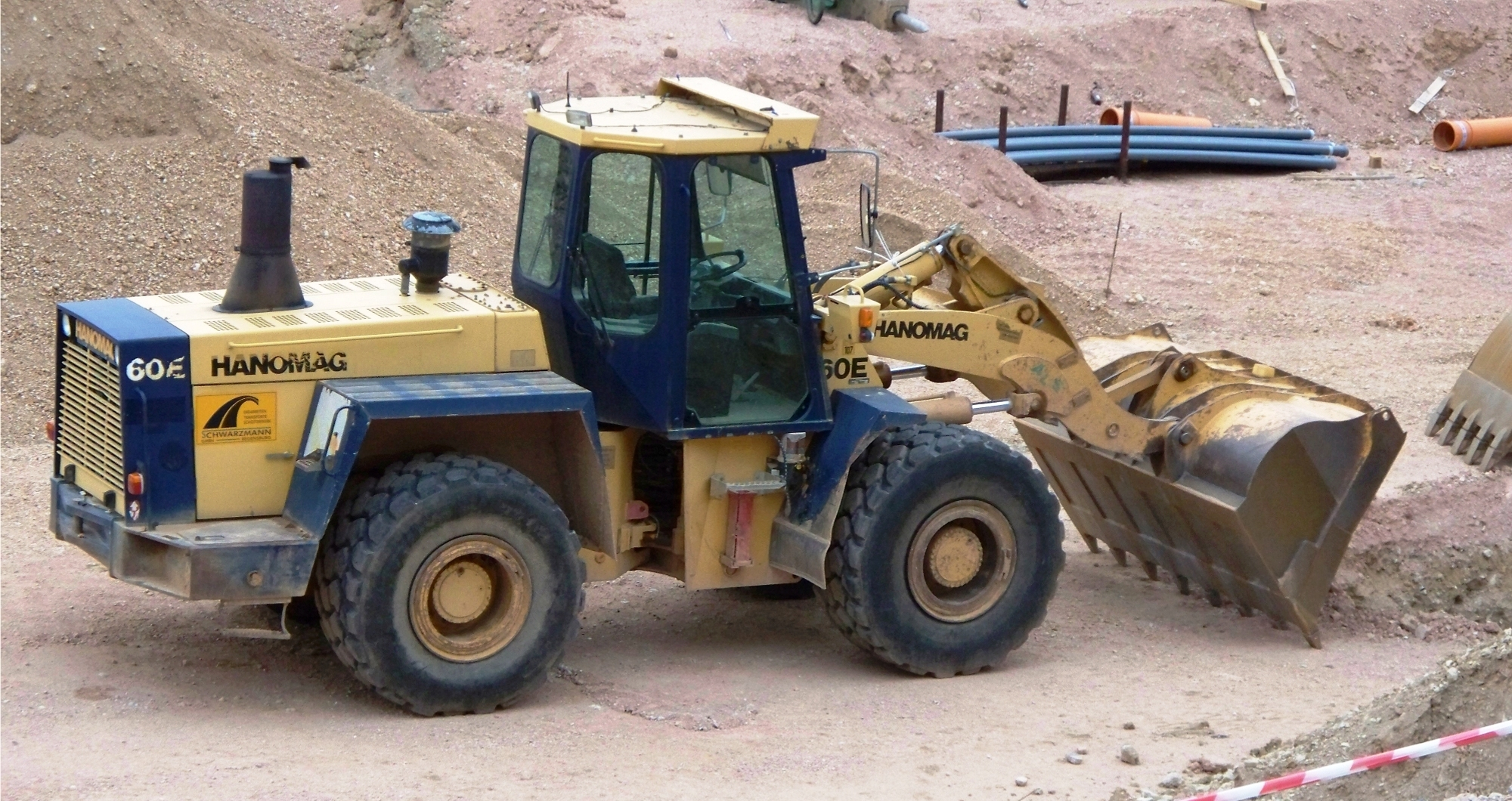
Hanomag loader

In Hanover, the company is producing wheel loaders ranging from 54 to 353 horsepower (40 to 263 kW) and since 2005 also has been producing wheeled excavators from 14 to 22 tonnes (31,000 to 49,000 lb). Thanks to the European Technical Center (EUTC), these correspond to the latest state of technology. In Hanover, the company develops construction machines which meet varied requirements of customers all over Europe as well as for certain products also worldwide.

== Hanomag in Argentina ==
In 1960, Cura Hnos began to build a billet factory from an electric furnace on the premises, which he later suspended for associating with Rheinstahl Hanomag, from Germany, to manufacture tractors. The new company by the merger, used the industrial warehouse of Granadero Baigorria, while the administration and factory of the new company was built.

Models produced

- R 40 A/B
- R 40 RCE / RCT
- R 46
- R 55
- R 57 Brillant
- R 60
- R 75 Super
- L 28

== See also ==
- Eicher tractor
- Lanz Bulldog
- Daimler-Benz
- Tempo
- Force Motors, formerly Bajaj Tempo, produced Hanomag products in India.
