= Hanomag L 28 =

Hanomag L28
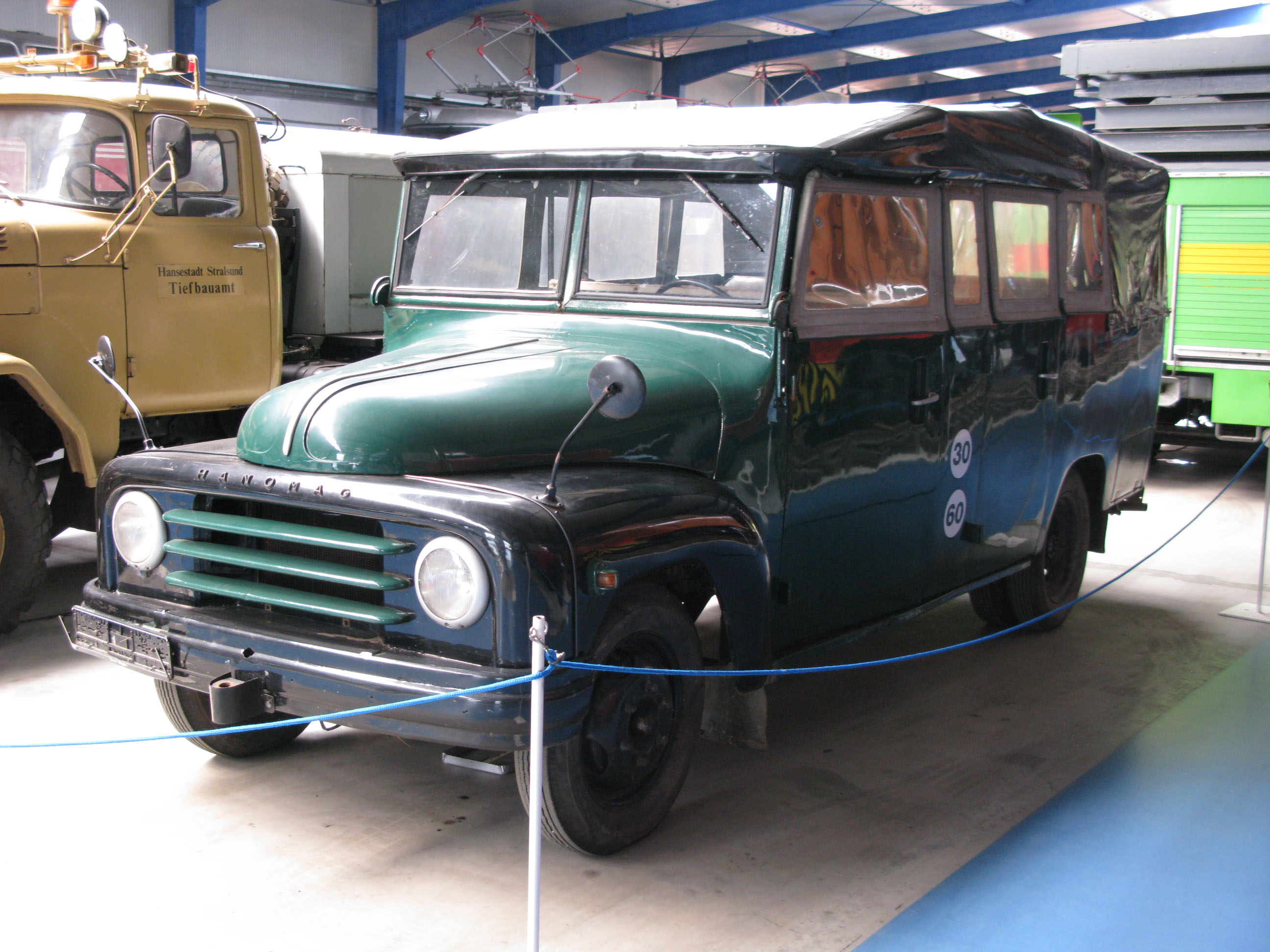

Overview
- Manufacturer: Hanomag
- Production: 1951–1979

Body and chassis
- Class: Medium-duty truck
- Body style: 2-door truck 3-door combination bus 5-door van 2-door trailer bus 2-door box van
- Layout: FR layout

Chronology
- Predecessor: Hanomag R-Series
- Successor: Hanomag F-series

The Hanomag L 28 was a light truck from the German manufacturer Hanomag that released in 1950. The vehicle was the first newly developed commercial vehicle from Hanomag after World War II. It belongs to the large vans and light trucks division.

It was designed as a modern long hood and had a so-called "alligator hood" based on American models and headlights integrated into the front of the vehicle (i.e. no longer free-standing), which gave the vehicle a modern appearance for the time. A short time later, the two competitors Opel Blitz (1952) and Borgward B 1500 (1954) also gained a similar appearance. The L 28 was initially designed for 1½ tons of payload, over time other versions for 2, 2½ and 3 tons of payload appeared, in 1956 a 1.75-tonner appeared instead of the 1½ and 2-ton versions. The entire model range was driven by Hanomag diesel engines, initially with 50 PS (37 kW). For the larger models there were later also diesel engines with 65 and 70 PS (48 and 51 kW). Popular versions were the platform truck, the closed panel van and the separate box body, and a minibus variant was also available with bodies from bodybuilders.

The water-cooled inline four-cylinder, four-stroke diesel engine with 2.8 L displacement of the Hanomag L 28 was equipped in 1953 with a Roots supercharger, which was driven by a V-belt. The sound of the Hanomag D-28 engines was characterized by the particularly striking "diesel nailing" and the "singing" of the blower.

In 1955 the L-28 cab received front hinged doors instead of the previously used rear hinged door and in recent years instead of the two small ones, a large curved panoramic windshield, which made the cab look much more modern. Between 1958 and 1960, the L 28 series was gradually replaced by the Hanomag Kurier, Garant and Markant front-link successor series, differently labeled according to their weight.

== Design ==
The type A-L 28 was built in the versions with 1½ t and 2½ t payload, as civil version A-L 28 Z and as all-wheel drive group car. Between 1953 and 1971 about 6,000 copies were made. The production peak was reached in 1963 with 1,657 vehicles.

The A-L 28 received the 2.8-liter diesel engine of the 3-ton L-28 model with an output of 70 PS (51 kW) at 2800 rpm. The vehicles had a ZF four-speed gearbox (AKS-25) with countershaft and simultaneous engagement of the front wheel drive (1: 1.18 / 1: 2.138). The second and third gear were synchronized. With an empty weight of 3860 kg, the top speed was 72 km/h (45 mph), the climbing ability 69%. Most recently, the vehicles were equipped with a hydraulically operated dual-circuit brake with compressed air support. One brake circuit worked on the front axle, the other behind. The vehicle was either fitted with single tires at the front and rear (versions A and A 1) or with twin tires (A 2) at the rear.

On April 1, 1969, the commercial vehicle divisions of Hanomag and Henschel-Werke merged to form Hanomag-Henschel Fahrzeugwerke GmbH (HHF) within the Rheinstahl group. Daimler AG initially acquired 51% of this company and the rest of the share capital at the end of 1970. The last A-L 28 were produced under the company name Hanomag-Henschel, in 1974 the Hanomag-Henschel brand disappeared from the truck market.
