= Hanomag Rekord =

Rekord
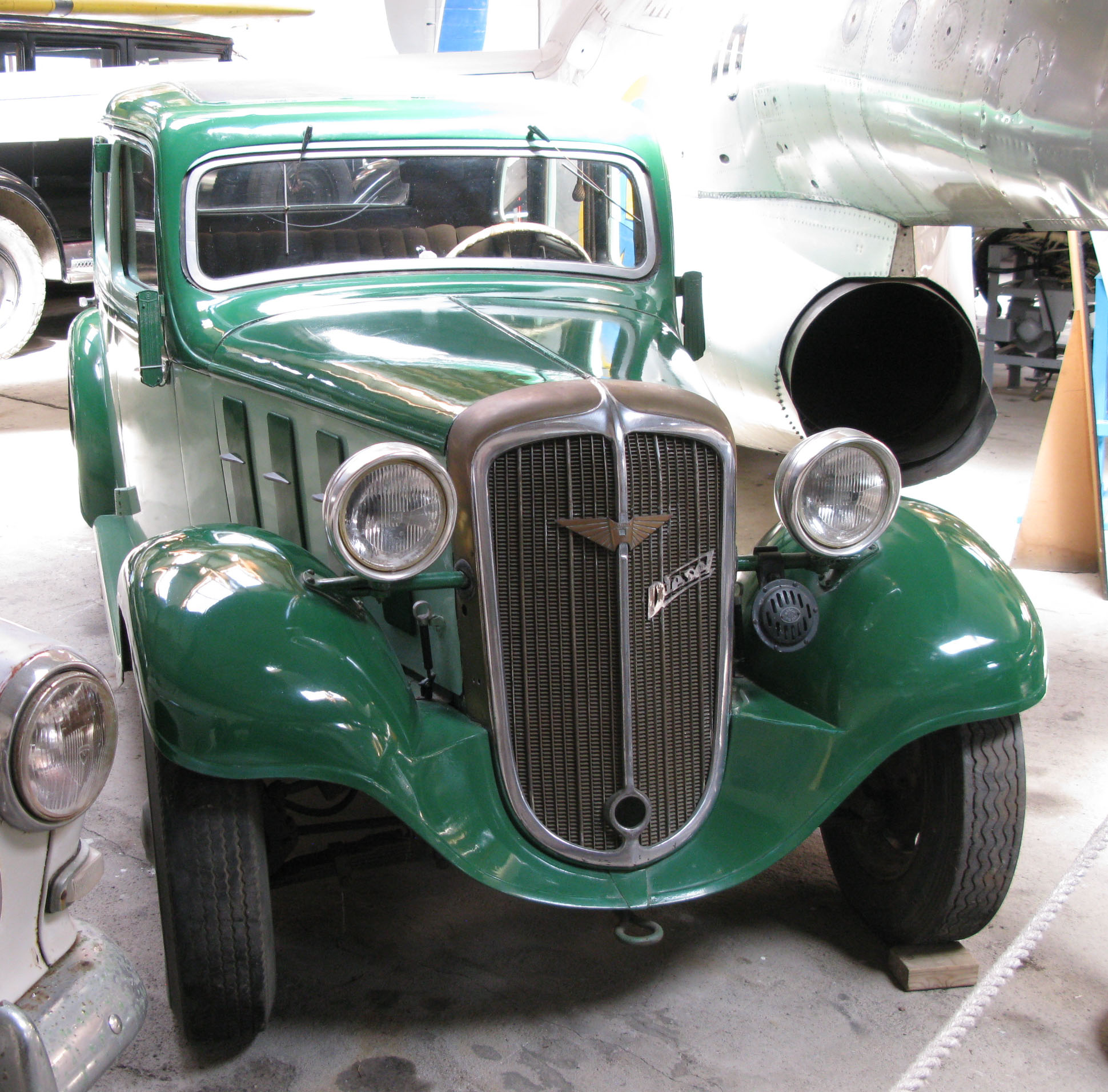
- Hanomag Rekord Diesel

Overview
- Manufacturer: Hanomag
- Production: 1933–1940
- Assembly: Hannover, Germany

Body and chassis
- Class: D-segment / Mid-size car
- Body style: two-door saloon; four-door saloon; two-door drophead coupé; four-door all-weather tourer; two-door coupé; rolling chassis
- Layout: front-engine, rear-wheel drive
- Platform: Hanomag Rekord

Powertrain
- Engine: 1.5 L straight-4 Otto; 1.9 L straight-4 Diesel
- Transmission: four-speed manual gearbox, semi-synchromesh
- Propulsion: tyres

Dimensions
- Wheelbase: 2,610 mm (102.8 in) (6/32 PS); 2,825 mm (111.2 in) (Typ 15 K / Typ 19 K)
- Length: 3,800 mm (149.6 in) (6/32 PS); 4,250 mm (167.3 in) (Typ 15 K / Typ 19 K)
- Width: 1,490 mm (58.7 in) (6/32 PS); 1,520 mm (59.8 in) (Typ 15 K / Typ 19 K)
- Height: 1,625 mm (64.0 in) (6/32 PS); 1,610 mm (63.4 in) (Typ 15 K / Typ 19 K)
- Kerb weight: 1,040 kg (2,293 lb) (6/32 PS); 1,050 kg (2,315 lb) (Typ 15 K); 1,250 kg (2,756 lb) (Typ 19 K); (saloon mass figures)

Chronology
- Predecessor: none
- Successor: none

The Hanomag Rekord is a mid-size car produced by Hanomag in Hannover from 1933 until 1940. The car was Hanomag's first mid-size model and one of the first mass-produced cars available with a diesel engine. Hanomag introduced the Rekord as the 6/32 PS intermediate model in autumn of 1933; the first car to bear the Rekord name followed shortly thereafter in February 1934. Compared with the 6/32 PS, the Rekords have a longer wheelbase, independent front suspension and different engine ancillaries. In 1937, the vehicle was updated with a new "streamlined" back, and the production of the diesel engine model commenced – prior to 1937, all Rekords were fitted with an Otto (spark ignition) engine. In total, Hanomag built 19,104 Rekords.

== Models ==
Hanomag offered five different models of the Rekord from 1933 until 1940:

- 6/32 PS (Typ 15); autumn 1933 – February 1934; 32 PS
- Rekord (Typ 15 K); February 1934 – 1936; 32 PS
- Rekord facelift (Typ 15 K); 1937 – 1938; 35 PS
- Rekord Diesel (Typ D 19 A); 1937 – 1938); 35 PS
- Diesel (Typ 19 K); 1938 – 1940); 35 PS

== History ==
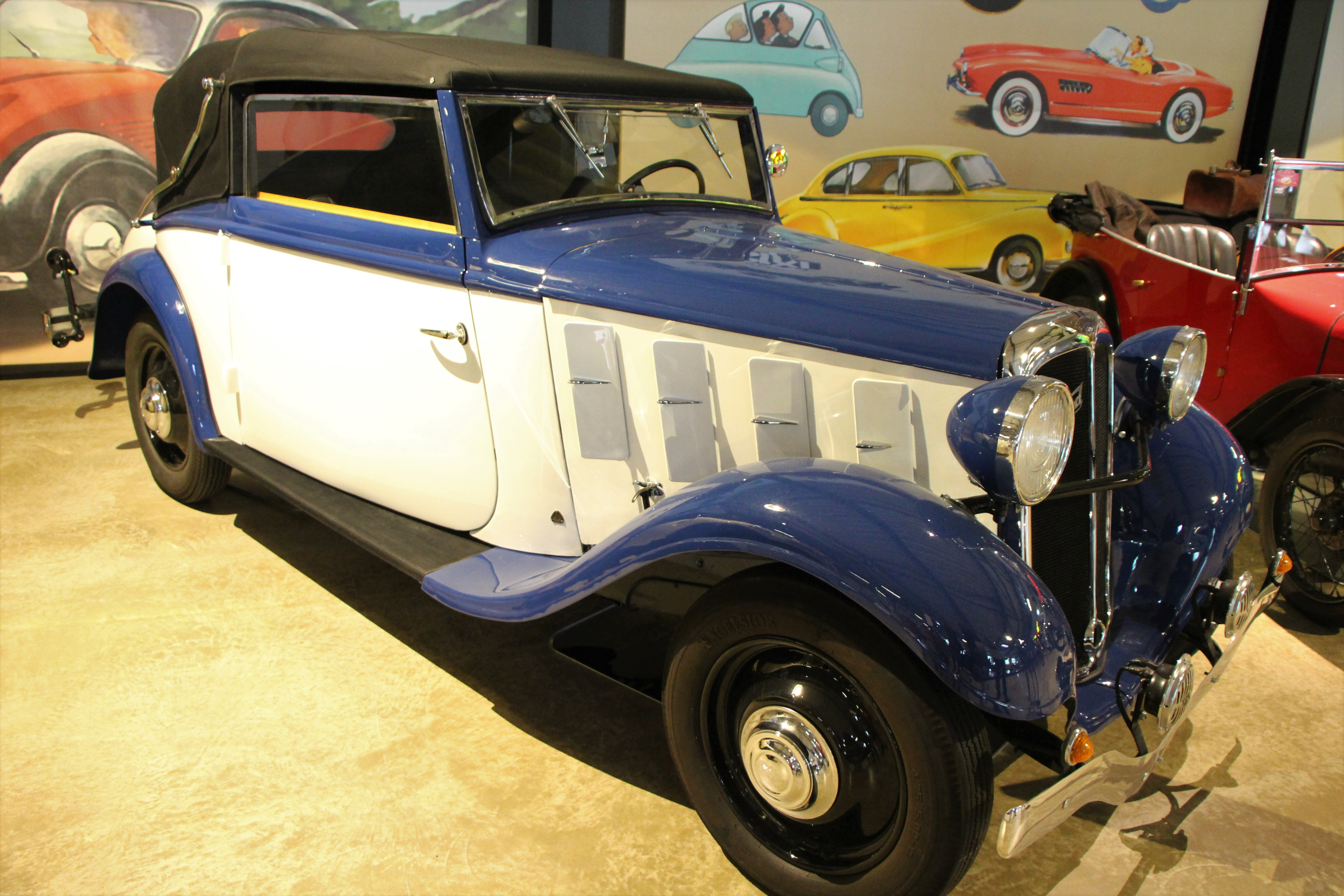
1934–1937 two-door drop-head coupé

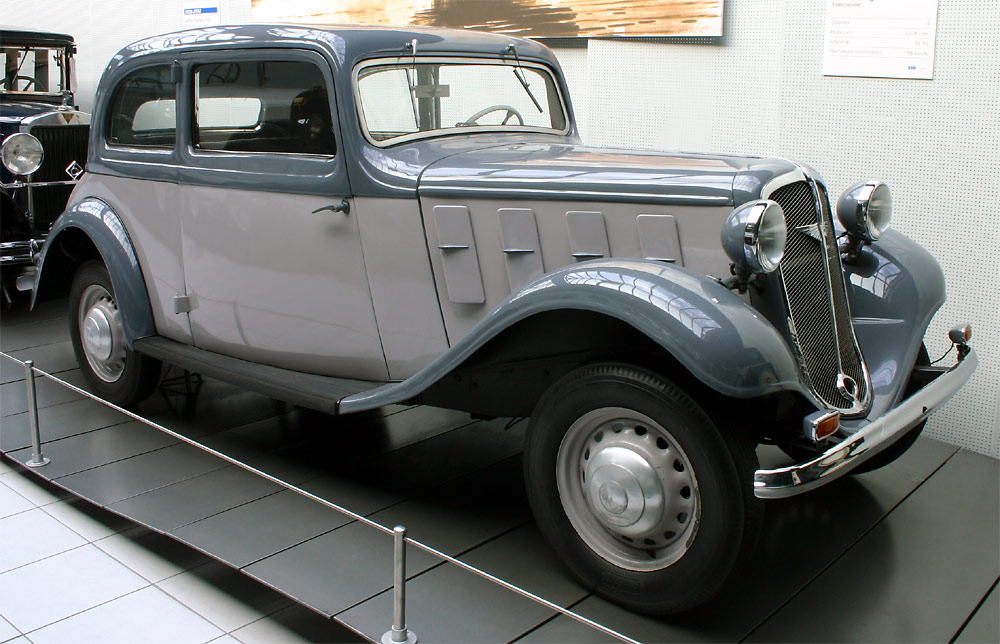
1938–1940 two-door saloon

The Rekord was Hanomag's first mid-size car, positioned in their model range in between the smaller Hanomag Garant, and the bigger Hanomag Sturm. They quietly introduced the car in autumn of 1933 as the 6/32 PS intermediate model. With the change in Hanomag's model naming scheme in early 1934 – they changed from the Steuer-PS scheme to a model name system – the car was officially introduced as the Rekord in February 1934. Compared with the 6/32 PS, Rekords have a slightly longer wheelbase, independent front suspension, and a proper cooling water pump rather than the 6/32 PS's primitive thermosiphon cooling. Unusual for Hanomag at the time was the decision to offer the Rekord as a four-door saloon, either with, or without a B-pillar.

In February 1936, Hanomag announced the Rekord Diesel at the 26th IAMA in Berlin. The first Hanomag Rekord Diesel prototype was fitted with a 74 mm × 95 mm straight-four engine, displacing 1,634 cm^{3} (99.7 in^{3}), rated at 32 PS (24 kW) that was designed by Lazar Schargorodsky. Eventually, Hanomag increased the cylinder bore to 80 mm (resulting in 1.9 litres of displacement), and decided to build the engine with a gear-driven rather than a chain-driven camshaft. Production of the Diesel engine commenced in 1937, and the official series production began the following year. A six-cylinder prototype version of the engine was designed and built, however, it was not put into series production. Werner Oswald (1979) argues that, the Rekord Diesel was comepetitively priced (at ℛℳ 4,875 for the four-door saloon). Norbye (1978) writes that Hanomag built about 2,500 Rekord Diesels, whereas according to Polaschek (2015) a number of 1,097 Rekord Diesels were built.

In 1937, the Rekord received a facelift. The bodywork was upgraded with a so-called "streamlined" back, and the rims were now perforated to give the car a more modern appearance. The fuel tank was moved from the engine compartment into the car's back, and increased in size from 32 litres to 54 litres. Hanomag also increased the compression of the Otto (spark ignition) engine from ε=5.6 to ε=6.2, and increased the rated power from 32 PS (24 kW) at 3000/min to 35 PS (26 kW) at 3500/min. Even with this increase in engine power, the Hanomag Rekord was still a rather "ponderous and slow" vehicle, with a top speed of about 100 km/h.

In 1938, a Hanomag Rekord Diesel – the so-called "Hanomag-Diesel-Stromlinien-Sportwagen" – was equipped with an aerodynamically optimised aluminium body that was designed by Járay Pál, and built by Wendler in Reutlingen. The engine was tuned to produce 40 PS (29 kW). On 8 and 9 February 1939, Hanomag engineer Karl Haeberle drove the car on the 14.6 km (9.1 mi) long Reichasautobahn section from Dessau to Bitterfeld and reached an average speed of 155.954 km/h (96.905 mph), and a top speed of 165 km/h (103 mph). The Hanomag-Diesel-Stromlinien-Sportwagen was destroyed during World War II. In 2013, Hanomag enthusiasts built a replica of the car, based on historical photographs and technical drawings.

== Technical description (1938) ==
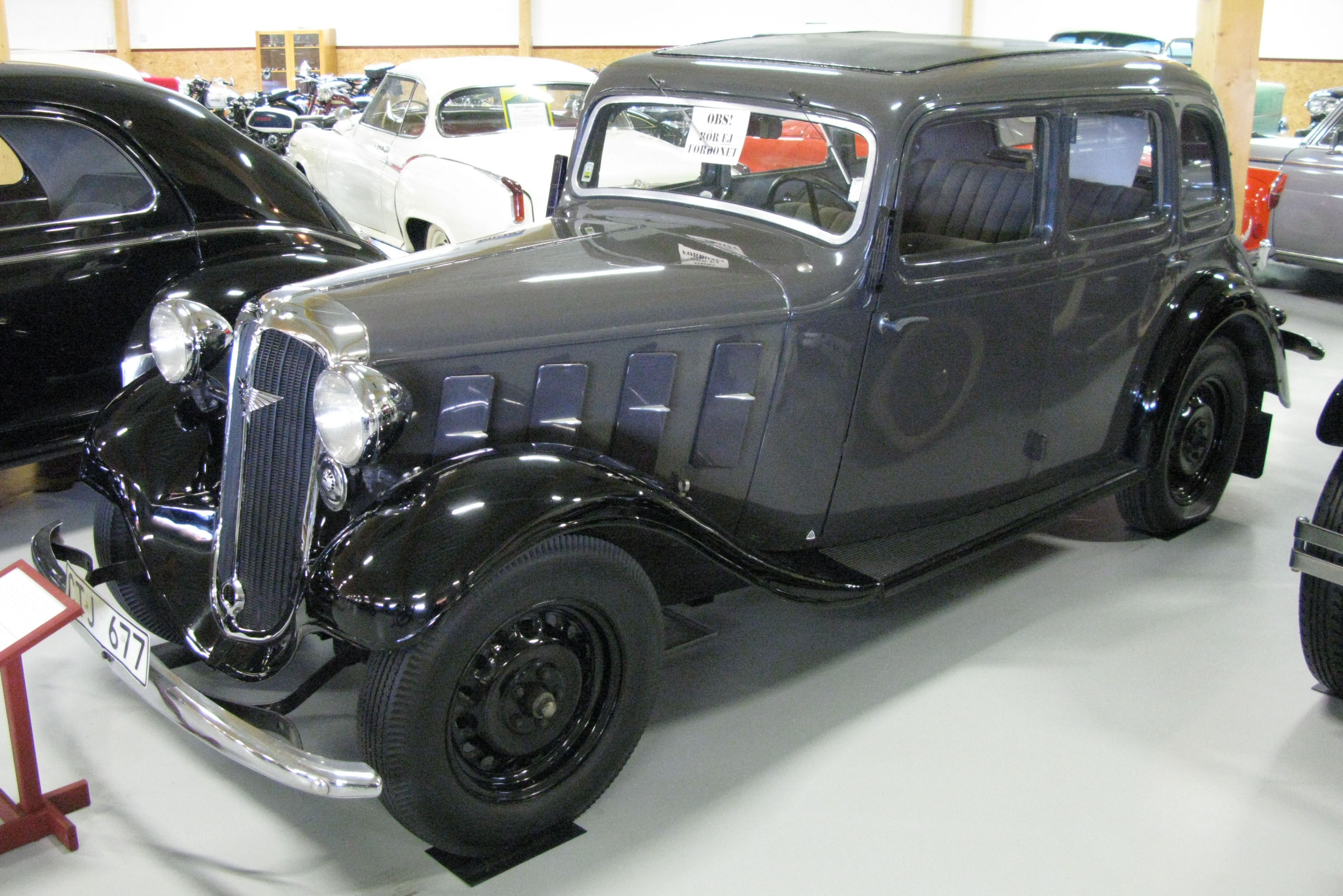
1938–1940 four-door saloon

The Hanomag Rekord has a body-on-frame design, a front engine, and rear-wheel drive. It was offered with various "Jupiter" body styles, including a two-door saloon, a four-door saloon, a two-seater two-door coupé, a two-door drophead coupé, a four-door all-weather tourer, and a rolling chassis. The bodies are all-steel, and made by Ambi-Budd.

=== Chassis ===
The frame is a low-profile ladder frame made from rectangular, box-profile steel tubes. In front, the car has an independent suspension system with a single upper transverse control arm for each wheel, and one transverse leaf spring acting as a transverse control arm. The rear axle is a leaf-sprung beam axle. The steel wheels are fitted with 4.75 by 17 inch or 5.50 by 16 inch tyres, and each wheel has a hydraulically operated drum brake. The steering system is a conventional worm-and-sector steering system. Hanomag employed a centralised lubrication system for the chassis.

=== Engine and drivetrain ===
Hanomag offered both a 1.5-litre Otto (spark ignition) engine, and a 1.9-litre Diesel (compression ignition) engine for the Rekord. The 1.5-litre engine is a straight-four cylinder engine with a chain-driven, in-block camshaft, overhead valves, three crankshaft bearings, and an updraught carburettor. The 1.9-litre, straight-four Diesel has a gear-driven, in-block camshaft, overhead valves, five crankshaft bearings, a cross-flow cylinder head, and pre-combustion chamber injection (with a Bosch inline injection pump). Due to the Diesel's higher compression of ε=20, it is fitted with a 1.3 kW, 12 V starter motor. Both engines are rated at 35 PS (26 kW) at 3500/min.

Since both engines have similar torque curves, Hanomag could install the same ZF gearbox with a 4.55 final drive in the Otto and Diesel versions of the car. It is a four-speed, constant-mesh gearbox with synchroniser rings on the second shaft, resulting in synchromesh on the third and fourth gear. The shift-lever is floor-mounted and has a conventional H-pattern. The torque is sent from the engine to the gearbox with a dry single-disc clutch.
