= 60S ribosomal protein L28 =

Protein found in humans

RPL28

Identifiers
- Aliases: RPL28, L28, ribosomal protein L28
- External IDs: OMIM: 603638; MGI: 101839; GeneCards: RPL28
Available structures
PDB	Ortholog search: PDBe RCSB
PDB	List of PDB id codes 5AJ0, 4UG0, 4V6X, 4UJD, 4D67, 4D5Y, 4UJE, 4UJC
Enzyme activity
EC #	BRENDA	ExPASy	KEGG	MetaCyc
3.6.5.3	↗	↗	↗	↗

Gene location (Human)
Chr.	Chromosome 19 (human)
Band	19q13.42	Start	55,385,932 bp
Band	19q13.42	End	55,403,250 bp

Gene location (Mouse)
Chr.	Chromosome 7 (mouse)
Band	7 A1|7 2.77 cM	Start	4,795,873 bp
Band	7 A1|7 2.77 cM	End	4,798,065 bp
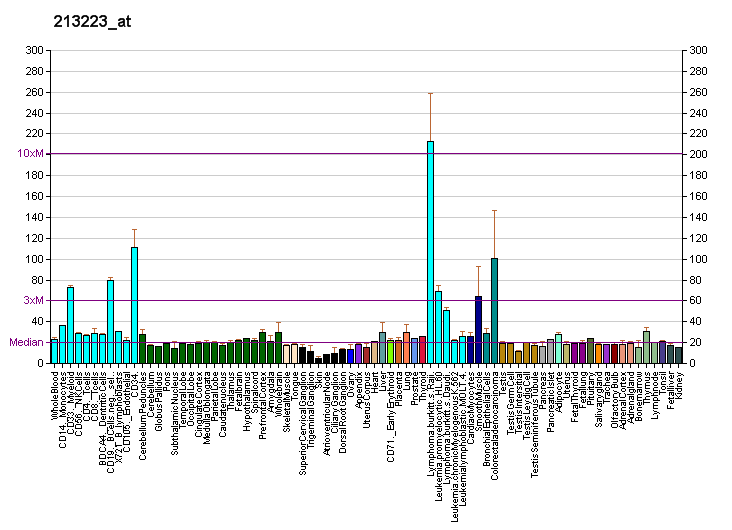
RNA expression pattern
Bgee	Human / Mouse (ortholog); Top expressed in: superficial temporal artery; oral cavity; skin of thigh; mucosa of paranasal sinus; skin of hip; trabecular bone; lower lobe of lung; human penis; caput epididymis; corpus epididymis / Top expressed in: urinary bladder; yolk sac; adrenal gland; white adipose tissue; bone marrow; epiblast; striatum of neuraxis; uterus; thymus; spleen; More reference expression data
BioGPS	More reference expression data
Gene ontology
Molecular function	protein binding; RNA binding; structural constituent of ribosome
Cellular component	cell body; cytosol; ribosome; membrane; intracellular anatomical structure; dendrite; cytoplasmic ribonucleoprotein granule; cytosolic large ribosomal subunit; extracellular exosome
Biological process	positive regulation of protein targeting to mitochondrion; viral transcription; SRP-dependent cotranslational protein targeting to membrane; regulation of autophagy of mitochondrion; translational initiation; nuclear-transcribed mRNA catabolic process, nonsense-mediated decay; rRNA processing; protein biosynthesis
Sources:Amigo / QuickGO
Orthologs
Databases	NCBI: entry; OMA: entry
Species	Human	Mouse
Entrez	6158	19943
Ensembl	ENSG00000108107	ENSMUSG00000030432
UniProt	P46779	P41105
RefSeq (mRNA)	NM_000991; NM_001136134; NM_001136135; NM_001136136; NM_001136137 NM_001363697	NM_009081
RefSeq (protein)	NP_000982; NP_001129606; NP_001129607; NP_001129608; NP_001129609 NP_001350626	NP_033107
Location (UCSC)	Chr 19: 55.39 – 55.4 Mb	Chr 7: 4.8 – 4.8 Mb
PubMed search
- Wikidata
View/Edit Human	View/Edit Mouse

60S ribosomal protein L28 is a protein that in humans is encoded by the RPL28 gene.

== Gene ==
Alternative splicing of RPL28 leads to multiple transcript variants encoding distinct isoforms. As is typical for genes encoding ribosomal proteins, there are multiple processed pseudogenes of this gene dispersed through the genome.

== Function ==
Ribosomes, the organelles that catalyze protein synthesis, consist of a small 40S subunit and a large 60S subunit. Together these subunits are composed of 4 RNA species and approximately 80 structurally distinct proteins. This gene encodes a ribosomal protein that is a component of the 60S subunit. The protein belongs to the L28E family of ribosomal proteins. It is located in the cytoplasm.

== Clinical significance ==
Variable expression of this gene in colorectal cancers compared to adjacent normal tissues has been observed, although no correlation between the level of expression and the severity of the disease has been found.
