= Mitochondrial ribosomal protein L28 =

Protein-coding gene in the species Homo sapiens

MRPL28

Identifiers
- Aliases: MRPL28, MAAT1, p15, mitochondrial ribosomal protein L28
- External IDs: OMIM: 604853; MGI: 1915861; GeneCards: MRPL28
Available structures
PDB	Ortholog search: PDBe RCSB
PDB	List of PDB id codes 3J7Y

Gene location (Human)
Chr.	Chromosome 16 (human)
Band	16p13.3	Start	366,969 bp
Band	16p13.3	End	371,289 bp

Gene location (Mouse)
Chr.	Chromosome 17 (mouse)
Band	17|17 A3.3	Start	26,342,474 bp
Band	17|17 A3.3	End	26,345,587 bp
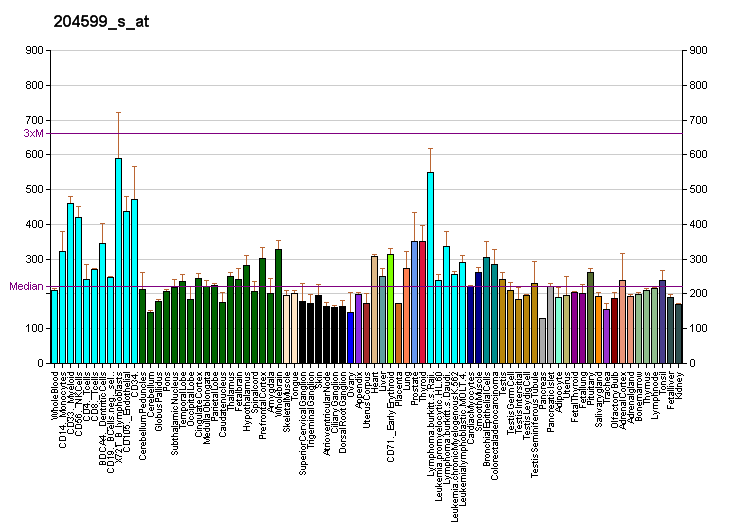
RNA expression pattern
Bgee	Human / Mouse (ortholog); Top expressed in: apex of heart; left testis; right testis; right frontal lobe; putamen; nucleus accumbens; prefrontal cortex; caudate nucleus; Brodmann area 9; cingulate gyrus / Top expressed in: cardiac muscle tissue of left ventricle; interventricular septum; right kidney; Ileal epithelium; embryo; epithelium of lens; otic vesicle; epiblast; embryo; right ventricle; More reference expression data
BioGPS	More reference expression data
Gene ontology
Molecular function	structural constituent of ribosome; protein binding; RNA binding
Cellular component	mitochondrial inner membrane; ribosome; mitochondrial ribosome; mitochondrion; cytosol; mitochondrial large ribosomal subunit
Biological process	mitochondrial translational elongation; mitochondrial translational termination; protein biosynthesis
Sources:Amigo / QuickGO
Orthologs
Databases	NCBI: entry; OMA: entry
Species	Human	Mouse
Entrez	10573	68611
Ensembl	ENSG00000086504	ENSMUSG00000024181
UniProt	Q13084; Q4TT37	Q9D1B9
RefSeq (mRNA)	NM_006428	NM_024227
RefSeq (protein)	NP_006419	NP_077189
Location (UCSC)	Chr 16: 0.37 – 0.37 Mb	Chr 17: 26.34 – 26.35 Mb
PubMed search
- Wikidata
View/Edit Human	View/Edit Mouse

39S ribosomal protein L28, mitochondrial is a protein that in humans is encoded by the MRPL28 gene.

Mammalian mitochondrial ribosomal proteins are encoded by nuclear genes and help in protein synthesis within the mitochondrion. Mitochondrial ribosomes (mitoribosomes) consist of a small 28S subunit and a large 39S subunit. They have an estimated 75% protein to rRNA composition compared to prokaryotic ribosomes, where this ratio is reversed. Another difference between mammalian mitoribosomes and prokaryotic ribosomes is that the latter contain a 5S rRNA. Among different species, the proteins comprising the mitoribosome differ greatly in sequence, and sometimes in biochemical properties, which prevents easy recognition by sequence homology. This gene encodes a 39S subunit protein, a part of which was originally isolated by its ability to recognize tyrosinase in an HLA-A24-restricted fashion.
