= Citroën 7U =

Overview
- Manufacturer: Citroën
- Production: 1935-1938

Body and chassis
- Layout: FR layout

Powertrain
- Engine: Petrol: 1.6 L Straight-4
- Transmission: 4-speed manual

Chronology
- Predecessor: Citroën 8CV
- Successor: none

The Citroën 7U was a car produced by the French Citroën company between 1935 and 1938.

With the introduction of the front-wheel drive Traction series, Citroën continued the rear-wheel drive production for potential customers who were apprehensive of the newcomer. The Rosalie 7U, along with the 11U were newly designed models using body shells from its predecessors, the Rosalie 8CV and 10/15CV, but incorporating an updated front-end style influenced by the "NH" Rosalie models and the Traction. The 1628 cc 4-cylinder engine was the same as used in the Traction 7 but was turned round to drive the rear axle.

Some 7,400 examples of this particular model were produced at the Paris factory from 1935 until 1938 when the model was ceased.
