= DKW =

German car and motorcycle marque, now Audi

- Industry: Automotive
- Founded: 1916
- Fate: Merged into Auto Union in 1932
- Successor: Auto Union (1932–1969); Audi NSU Auto Union AG (1969−1985); Audi AG (since 1985)
- Headquarters: Germany: Zschopau (1916–1932); Chemnitz (1932–1948); Ingolstadt (since 1949)
- Key people: Jørgen Skafte Rasmussen, founder
- Products: cars, motorcycles

DKW (Note: DKW is derived from the compound word "Dampfkraftwagen" (steam-powered car); other meanings for DKW include "des Knaben Wunsch" (the boy's wish), "das kleine Wunder" (the little wonder), and "der korrekte Wagen" (the correct car).) was a German car and motorcycle marque. DKW was one of the four companies that formed Auto Union in 1932 and thus became an ancestor of the modern-day Audi company.

In 1916, Danish engineer Jørgen Skafte Rasmussen founded a factory in Zschopau, Saxony, Germany, to produce steam fittings. That year he attempted to produce a steam car, German: Dampfkraftwagen (lit. steam-powered wagon), from which the acronym DKW is derived. That steam car was unsuccessful, and in 1919 he made toy two-stroke engines under the name des Knaben Wunsch – the boy's wish. He put a slightly modified version of the toy engine into a motorcycle and called it das kleine Wunder – the little wonder, and by the late 1920s DKW had become the world's largest motorcycle manufacturer.

In September 1924, DKW bought Slaby-Beringer, saving them from Germany's hyperinflation. Rudolf Slaby became chief engineer at DKW. In 1932, DKW merged with Audi, Horch and Wanderer to form Auto Union. After World War II, DKW moved to West Germany. The original factory became MZ. Auto Union came under Daimler-Benz ownership in 1957 and was purchased by the Volkswagen Group in 1964. The last started German-built DKW car was the F102, which ceased production in 1966 (the last model bas DKW Munga, which production had started already in 1956). F102's successor, the four-stroke F103, was marketed under the Audi brand, another Auto Union marque.

DKW-badged cars continued to be built under license in Brazil and Argentina until 1967 and 1969 respectively. The DKW trademark is currently owned by Auto Union GmbH, a wholly owned subsidiary of Audi AG which also owns the rights to other historical trademarks and intellectual property of the Auto Union combine.

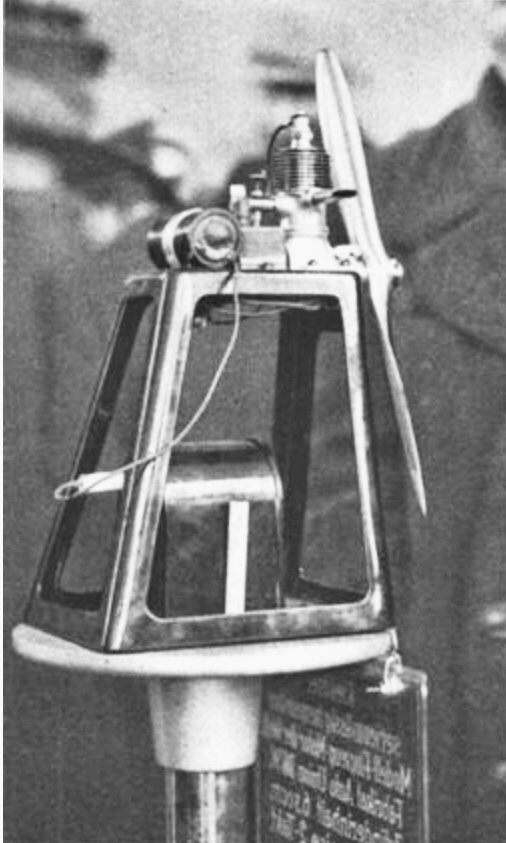
DKW 6.3 cc model airplane motor (1938) The smallest engine ever produced by DKW was a 6.3 cc unit for model airplanes and was exhibited at the International Automobile and Motorcycle Exhibition in Berlin in 1938.

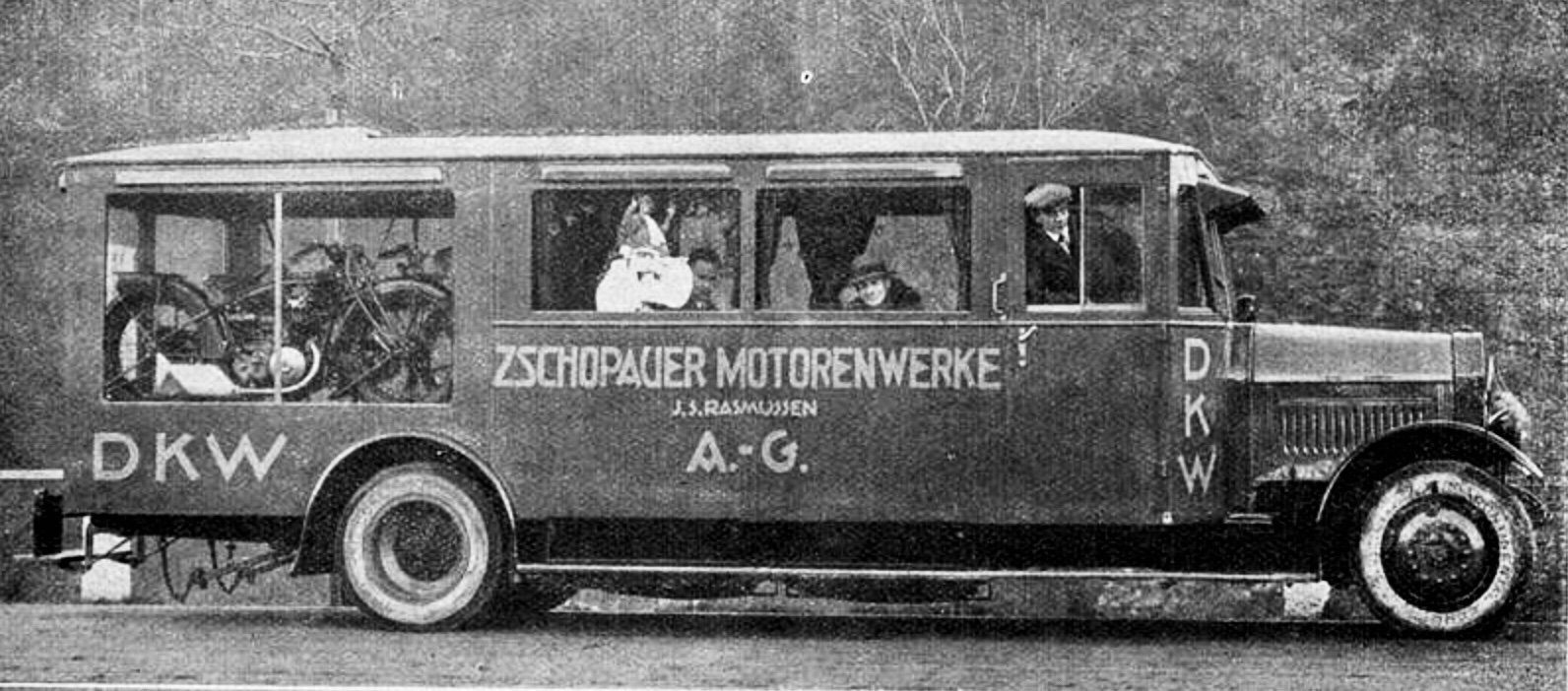
DKW mobile sales promotion vehicle (1926) The sales buses built by Vogtländische Maschinenfabrik AG Plauen (Vomag) were designed as a showcase in the rear part of the body, while the front end housed a small office where sales contracts could be issued and signed immediately.

== Automobiles made between 1928 and 1942 ==
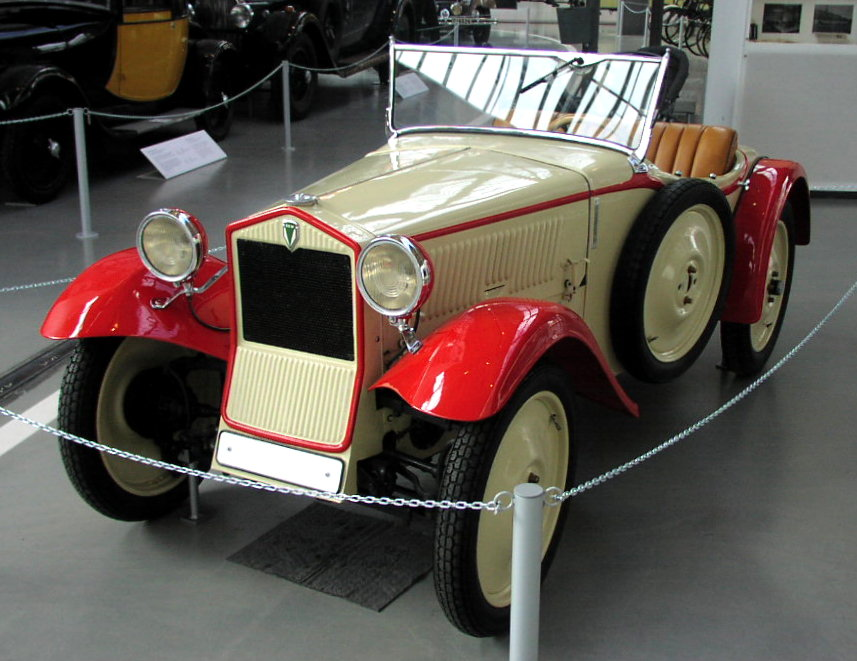
1931 DKW F1

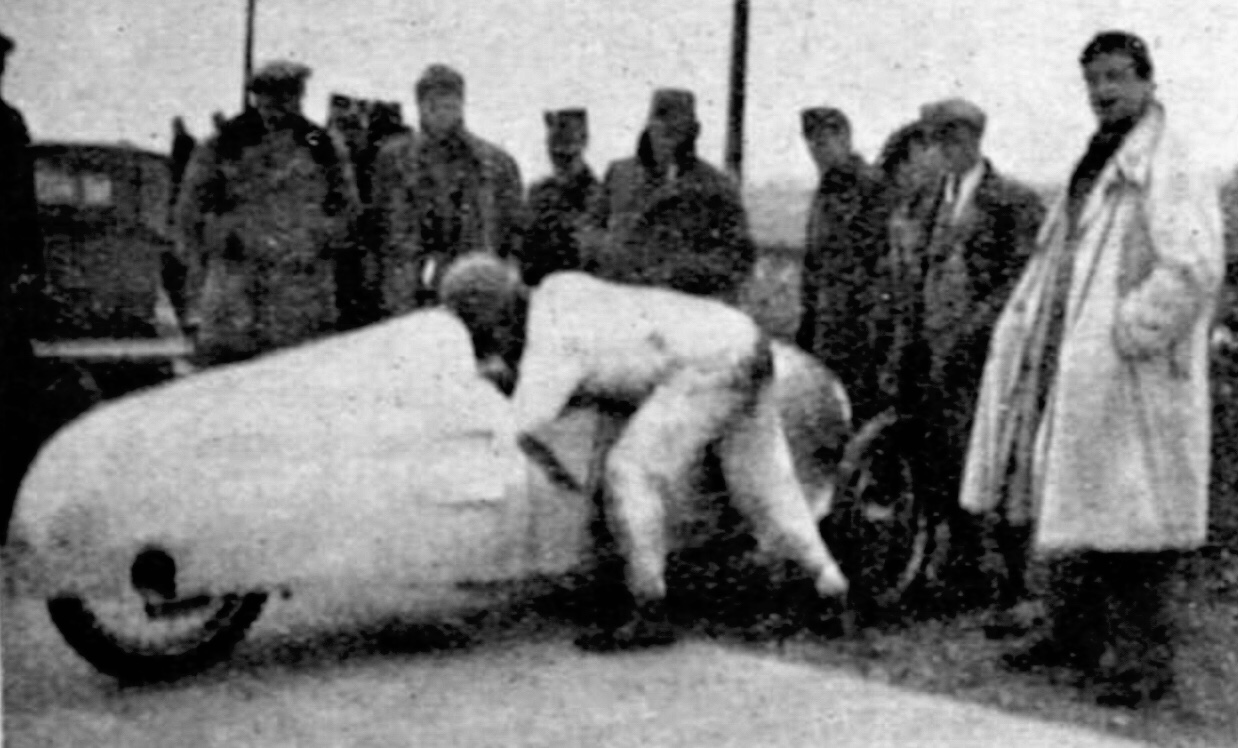
DKW Cyclecar 350 cc Class Driver Josef Möritz (1935)

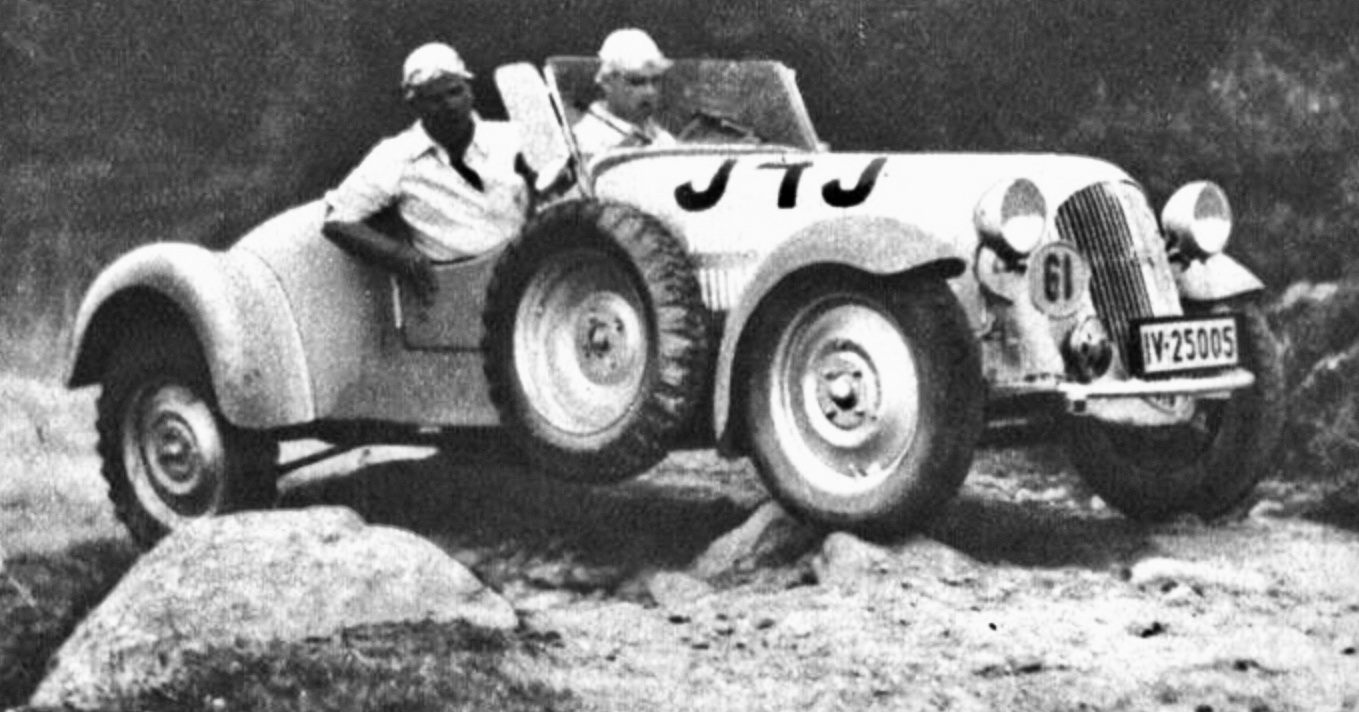
DKW Geländesportwagen (1936-1938)

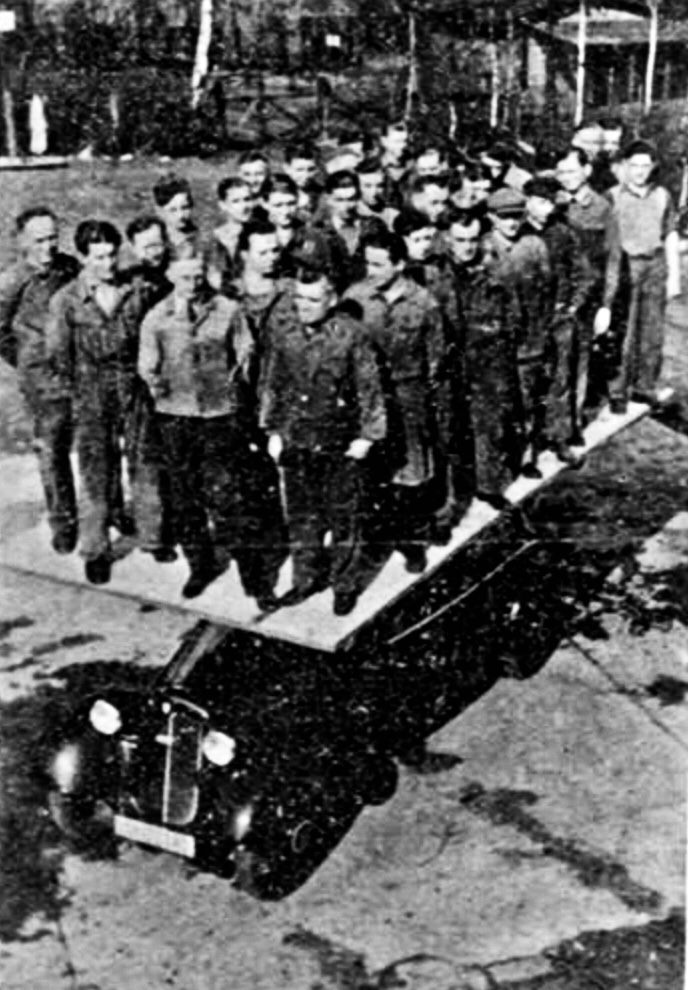
Illustration of the load-bearing capacity of a DKW body. (1937)

DKW cars were made from 1928 until 1968, apart from the interruption caused by the Second World War. DKWs always used two-stroke engines, reflecting the company's position by the end of the 1920s as the world's largest producer of motorcycles. The first DKW car, the small and rather crude Typ P, emerged on 7 May 1928 and the model continued to be built at the company's Spandau (Berlin) plant, first as a roadster and later as a stylish if basic sports car, until 1931.

More significant was a series of inexpensive cars built 300 km (185 miles) to the south in Zwickau in the plant acquired by the company's owner Jørgen Skafte Rasmussen in 1928 when he had become the majority owner in Audi Werke AG. Models F1 to F8 (F for Front) were built between 1931 and 1942, with successor models reappearing after the end of the war in 1945. They were the first volume production cars in Europe with front wheel drive, and were powered by transversely mounted two-cylinder two-stroke engines. Displacement was 584 or 692 cc: claimed maximum power was initially 15 PS, and from 1931 a choice between 18 or 20 hp (15 kW). These models had a generator that doubled as a starter, mounted directly on the crankshaft, known as a Dynastart. DKW in Zwickau produced approximately 218,000 units between 1931 and 1942. Most of those cars were sold on the home market and over 85% of DKWs produced in the 1930s were the little F series cars: DKW reached second place in German sales by 1934 and stayed there, accounting for 189,369 of the cars sold between 1931 and 1938, more than 16% of the market.

Between 1929 and 1940, DKW produced a less well remembered but technically intriguing series of rear-wheel drive cars called (among other names) Schwebeklasse and Sonderklasse with two-stroke V4 engines. Engine displacement was 1,000 cc, later 1,100 cc. The engines had two extra cylinders that acted as air compressors for forced induction, so they had the external appearance of a V6 engine but without spark plugs on the front cylinder pair.

In 1939, DKW made a prototype with the first three-cylinder engine, with a displacement of 900 cc and producing 30 hp (22 kW). With a streamlined body, the car could run at 115 km/h (71 mph). It was put into production after World War II, first as an Industrieverband Fahrzeugbau (IFA) F9 in Zwickau, East Germany, and shortly afterwards in DKW-form from Düsseldorf as the 3=6 or F91.

Saab used DKW engines as a model for the Saab two-stroke in their first production car, the Saab 92.

== Automobiles made after 1945 ==
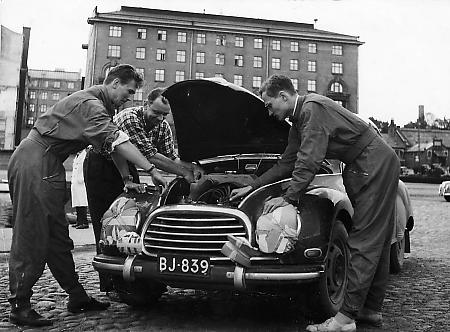
Osmo Kalpala servicing his DKW during the 1956 Rally Finland.

As Auto Union was based in Saxony in what became the German Democratic Republic (East Germany), it took some time for it to regroup after the war. The company was registered in West Germany as Auto Union GmbH in 1949, first as a spare-part provider, but soon to take up production of the RT 125 motorcycle and a new delivery van, called a Schnellaster F800. Their first line of production took place in Düsseldorf. This van used the same engine as the last F8 made before the war.

Their first car was the F89 using the body from the prototype F9 made before the war and the two-cylinder two-stroke engine from the last F8. Production went on until it was replaced by the successful three-cylinder engine that came with the F91. The F91 was in production 1953–1955, and was replaced by the larger F93 in 1956. The F91 and F93 had 900 cc three-cylinder two-stroke engines, the first ones delivering 34 hp (25 kW), the last 38 hp (28 kW). The ignition system comprised three independent sets of points and coils, one for each cylinder, with the points mounted in a cluster around a single lobed cam at the front end of the crankshaft. The cooling system was of the free convection type assisted by a fan driven from a pulley mounted at the front end of the crankshaft.

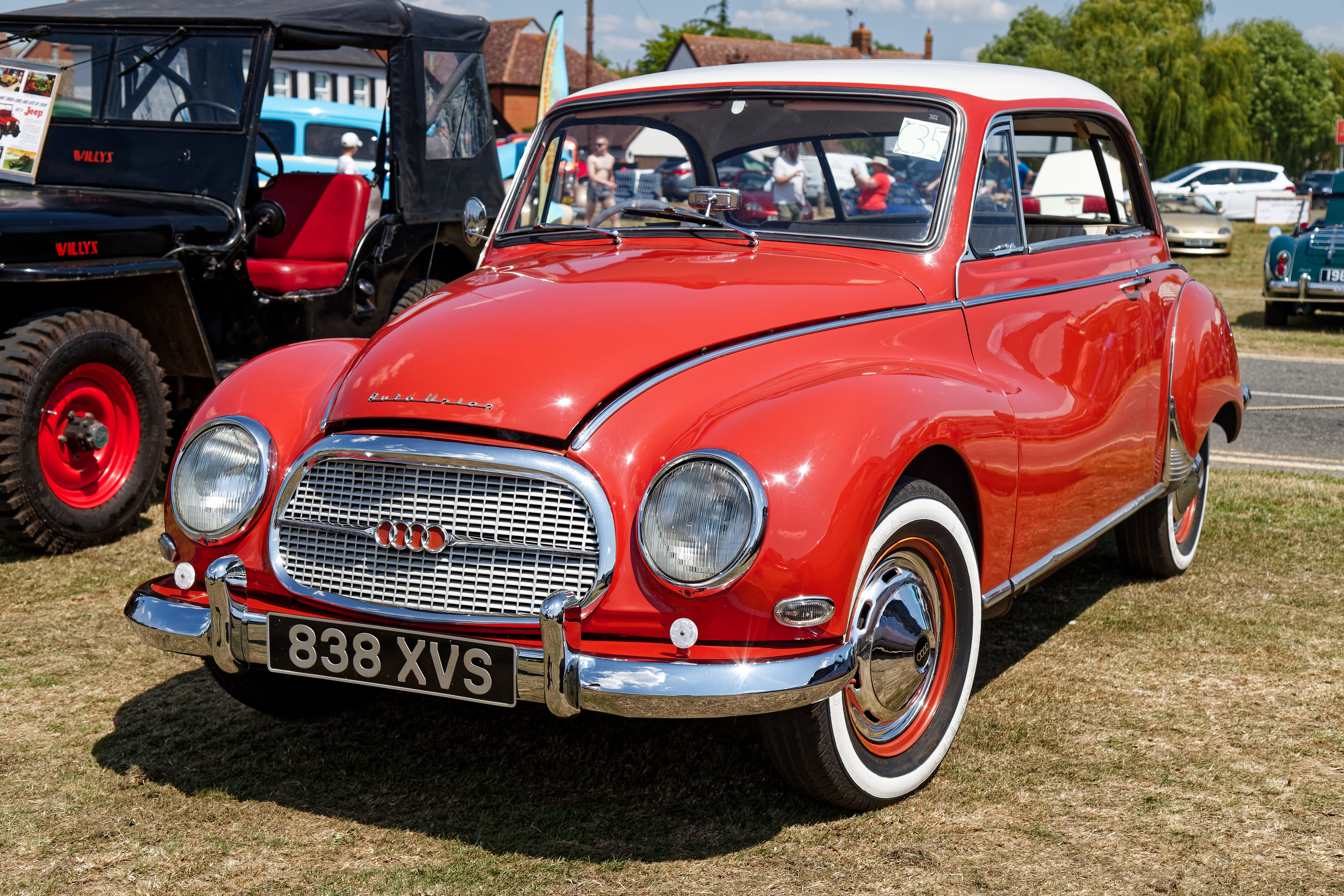
1958 Auto Union 1000 Coupe de Luxe

The F93 was produced until 1959, and was replaced by the Auto-Union 1000. These models were produced with a 1,000 cc two-stroke engine, with a choice between 44 hp (33 kW) or 50 hp (37 kW) S versions until 1963. During this transition, production was moved from Düsseldorf to Ingolstadt, where Audi still has its production. From 1957, the cars could be fitted with a saxomat, an automatic clutch, the only small car then offering this feature. The last versions of the Auto-Union 1000S had disc brakes as option, an early development for this technology. A sporting 2+2 seater version was available as the Auto-Union 1000 SP from 1957 to 1964, the first years only as a coupé and from 1962 also as a convertible.

In 1956, the very rare DKW Monza was put into small-scale production on a private initiative, with a sporting two-seater body of glassfiber on a standard F93 frame. It was first called Solitude, but got its final name from the long-distance speed records it made on the Autodromo Nazionale Monza in Italy in December 1956. Running in Fédération Internationale de l'Automobile (FIA) class G, it set records including 48 hours at an average speed of 140.961 km/h (87.589 mph), 10,000 km at 139.453 km/h (86.652 mph) and 72 hours at 139.459 km/h (86.656 mph). The car was first produced by Dannenhauer & Strauss in Stuttgart, then by Massholder in Heidelberg and lastly by Robert Schenk in Stuttgart. The number produced is said to be around 75, 50 survived. Production finished by the end of 1958.

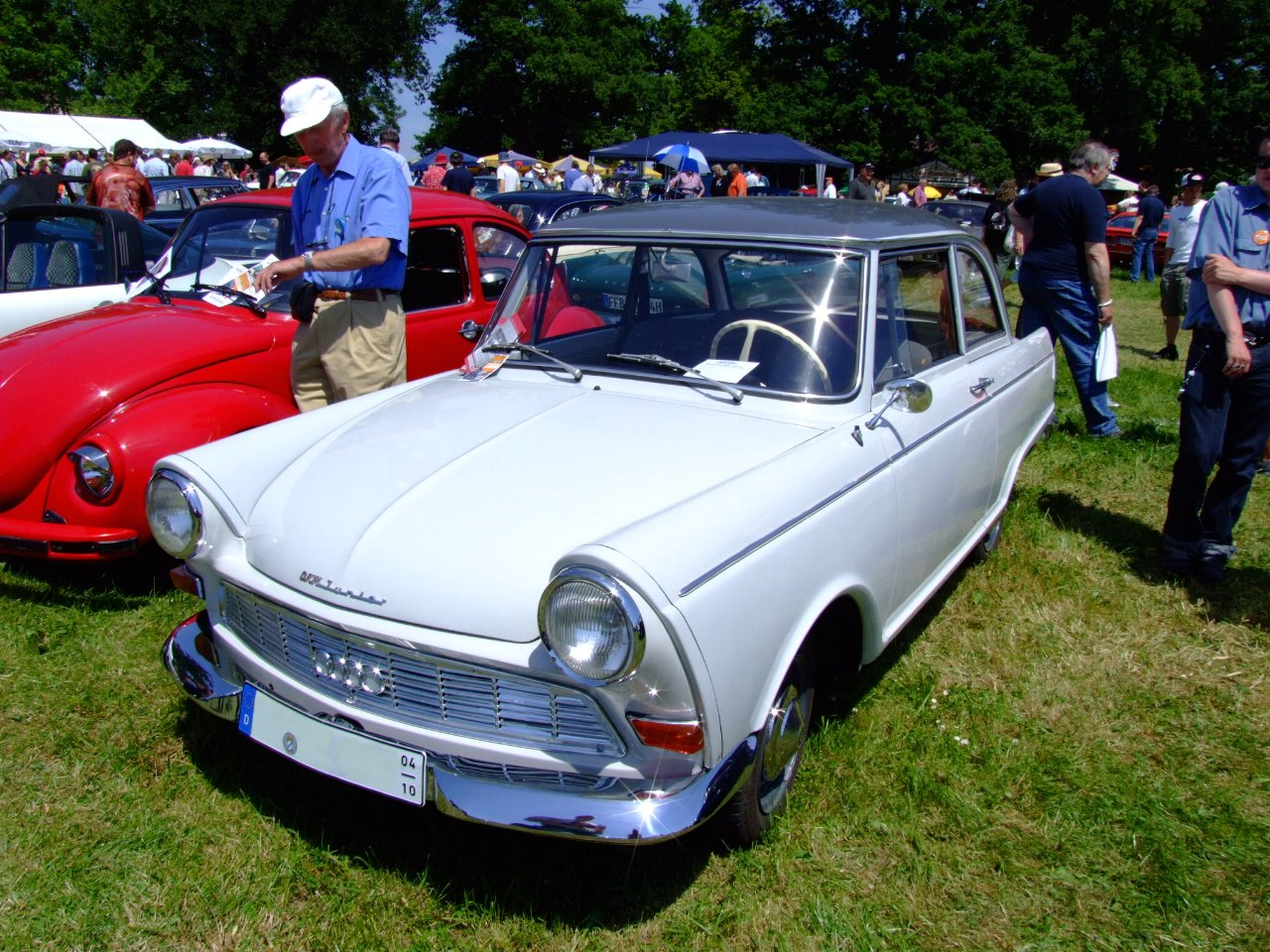
DKW Junior (1962)

A more successful range of cars was sold from 1959, the Junior/F12 series based on a modern concept from the late 1950s. The range consists of Junior (basic model) made from 1959 to 1961, Junior de Luxe (a little enhanced) from 1961 to 1963, F11 (a little larger) and F12 (larger and bigger engine) from 1963 to 1965, and F12 Roadster from 1964 to 1965. The Junior/F12 series became quite popular, and many cars were produced. An assembly plant was licensed in Ballincollig, County Cork, Ireland between 1952 and c.1964 and roughly 4,000 vehicles were assembled, ranging from saloons, vans and motorbikes to commercial combine harvesters. This was the only DKW factory outside Germany in Europe and for many years after its closure its large DKW sign could be visible on the wall of the factory. The building was demolished in the late 2000s and was redeveloped into a German Aldi store and a McDonald's drive-thru.

All the three-cylinder two-stroke post-war cars had some sporting potential and formed the basis for many rally victories in the 1950s and early 1960s. This made DKW the most winning car brand in the European rally league for several years during the fifties.

In 1960, DKW developed a V6 engine by combining two three-cylinder two-stroke engines, with a capacity of 1,000 cc. The capacity was increased and the final V6 in 1966 had a capacity of 1,300 cc, which developed 83 hp (62 kW) at 5,000 rpm using the standard configuration with two carburettors. A four-carburettor version produced 100 hp (75 kW), a six-carburettor one 130 hp (97 kW). It weighed only 84 kg (185 lb). The V6 was planned to be used in the DKW Munga and the F102. About 100 engines were built for testing purposes and 13 DKW F102 and some Mungas were fitted with the V6 engine in the 1960s.

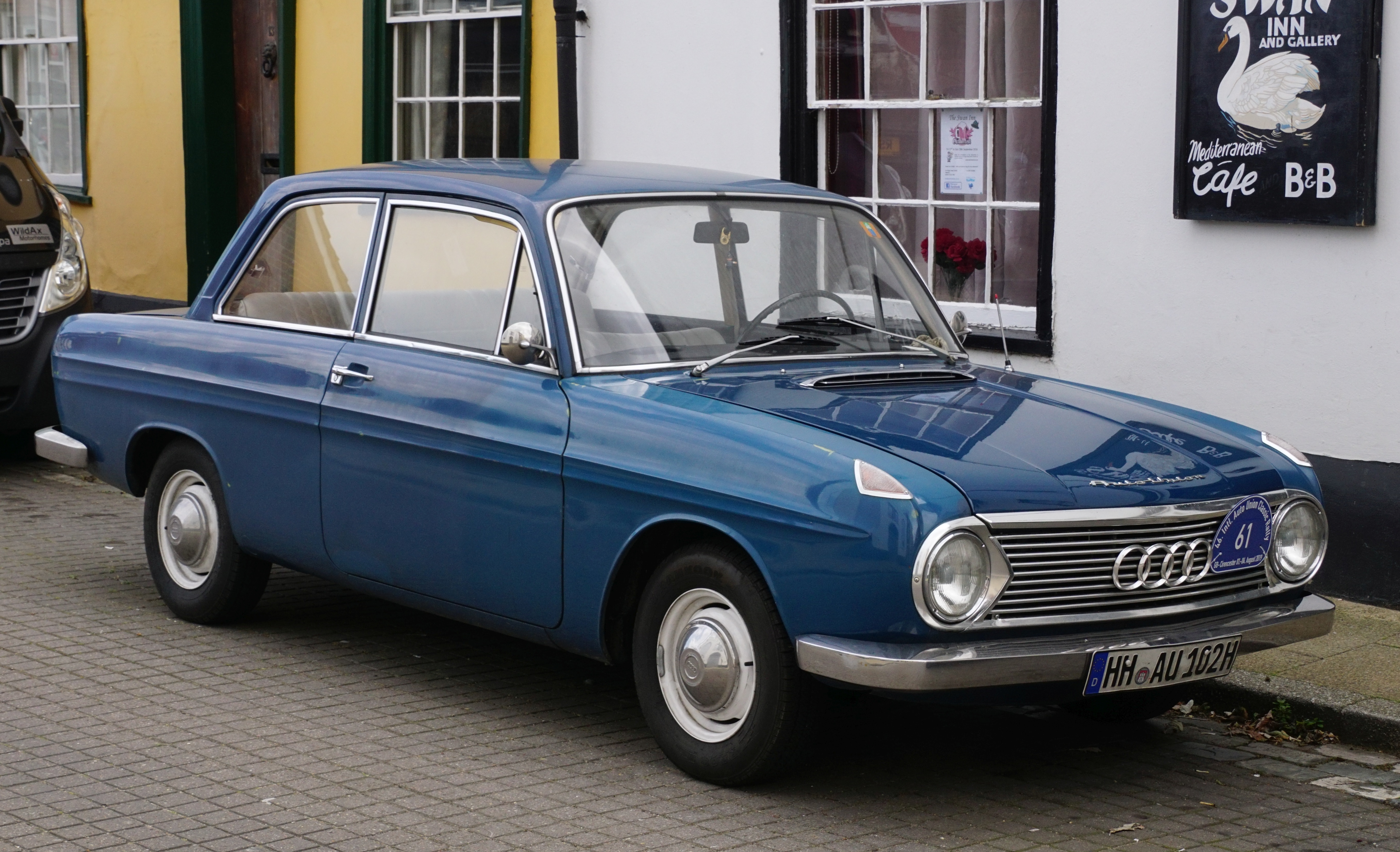
The DKW F102

The last started DKW production model was the F102, coming into production in 1964 (the last model DKW Munga had started 1956) as a replacement for the old-looking AU1000. However, the F102 sold poorly, largely due to its two-stroke engine technology which was at the limit of its development. Auto Union's parent, Daimler-Benz, decided to offload the company to Volkswagen. The car was re-engineered with a four-stroke engine and relaunched as the Audi F103. This marked the end of the DKW marque for cars, and the rebirth of the Audi name.

From 1956 to 1961, Dutch importer Hart, Nibbrig & Greve assembled cars in an abandoned asphalt factory in Sassenheim, where they employed about 120 workers, two transporter, that collected SKD kits from Duesseldorf and built about 13.500 cars. When the DKW plant moved the import of SKD kits stopped, as it became too expensive.

== DKW Worldwide ==
- Brazil

From 1957 to 1967, DKW cars were made in Brazil by the local company Vemag (Veículos e Máquinas Agrícolas S.A., "Vehicles and Agricultural Machinery Inc."). Vemag was assembling Scania-Vabis trucks, but Scania Vabis became an independent company in July 1960. The original plans were to build the Candango off-roader (Munga), a utility vehicle and a four-door sedan, called Vemaguet and Belcar respectively. The first model built was the 900 cc F91 Universal but the Belcar and Vemaguet names were applied later.

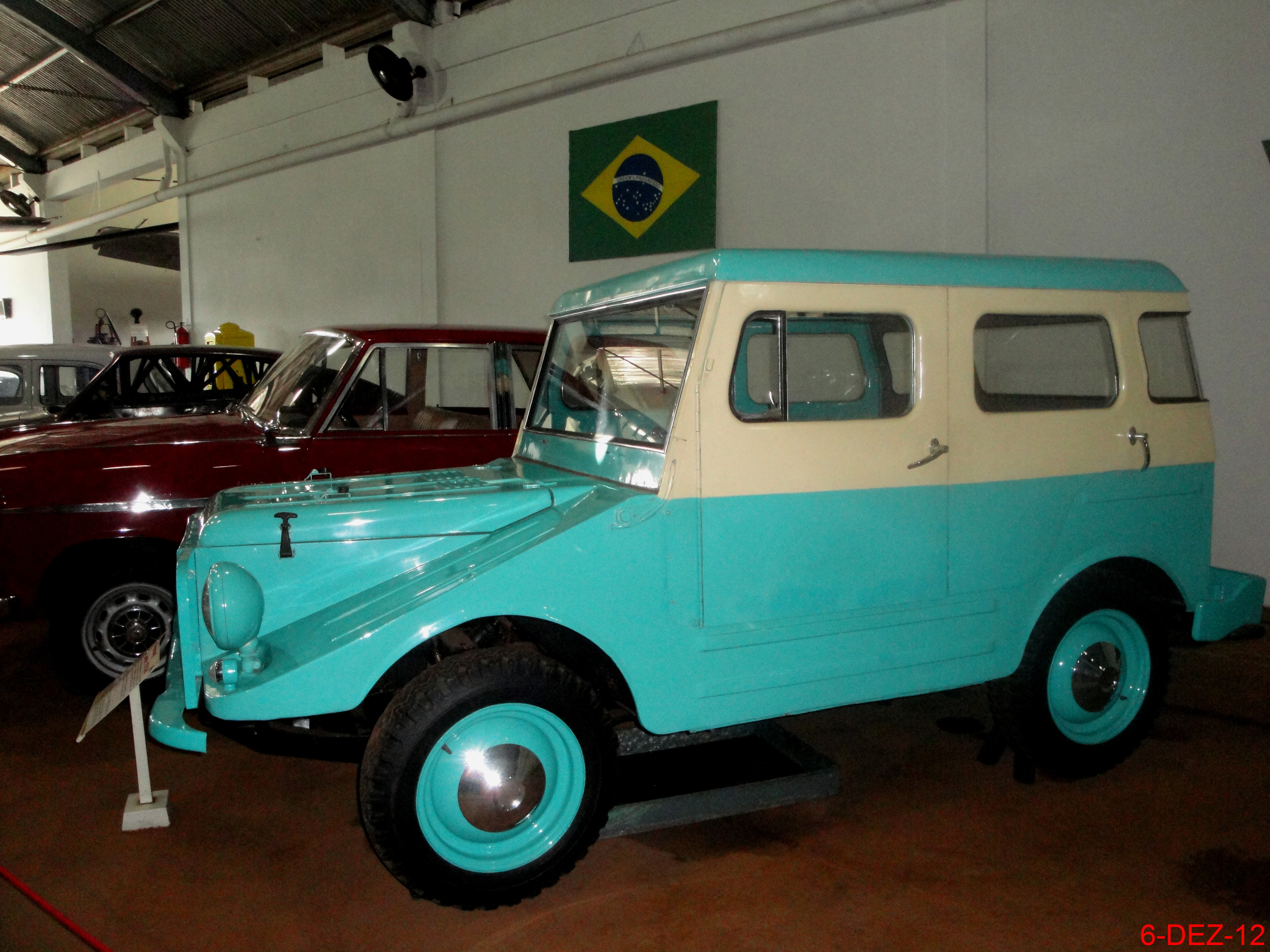
Candango (1957-1963)

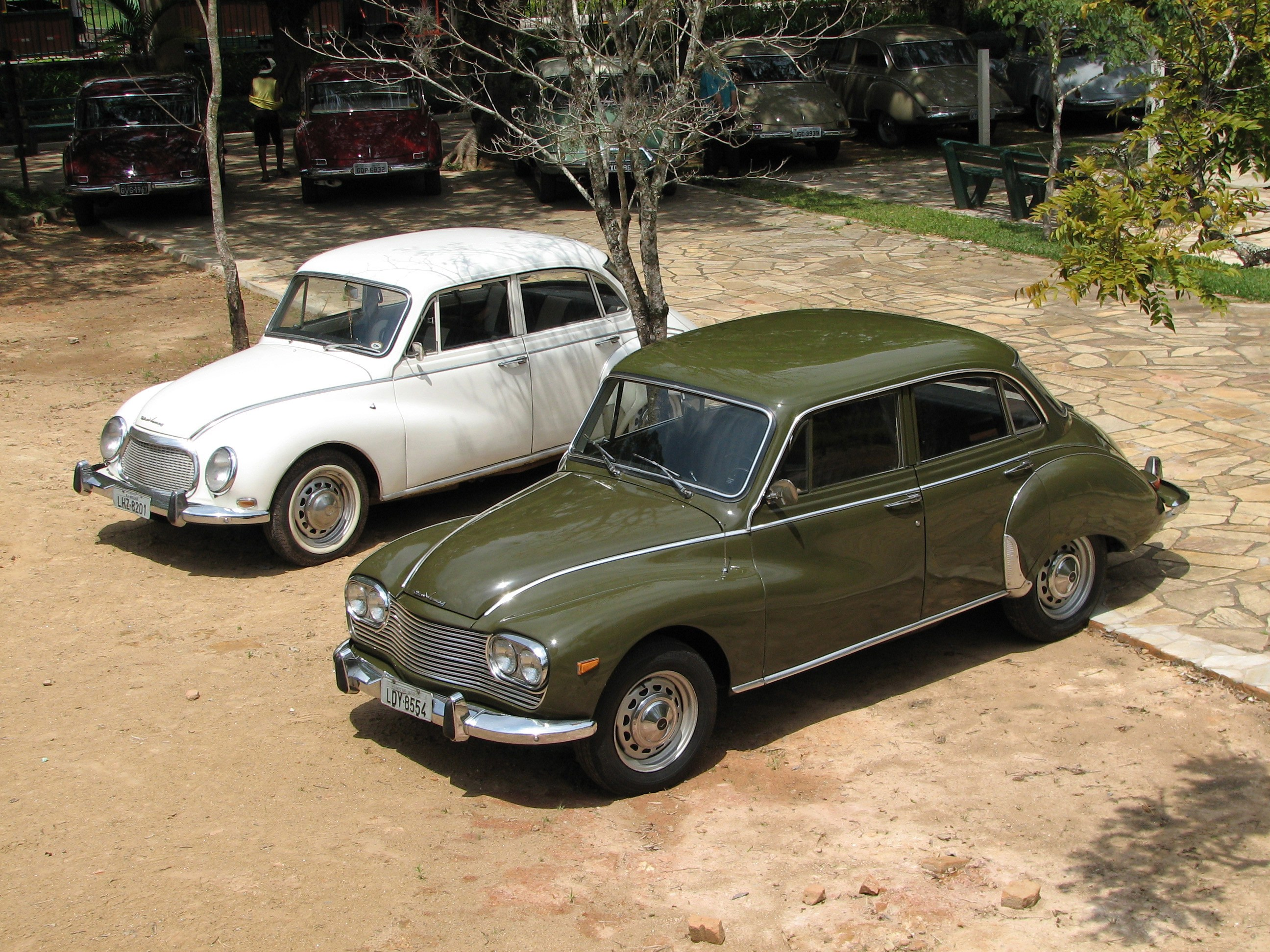
A second series 1967 DKW-Vemag Belcar in front of a first series 1964 DKW-Vemag Belcar

In 1958, the F94 four-door sedan and station wagon were launched, in the early 1960s renamed Belcar and Vemaguet. The company also produced a luxury coupe (the DKW Fissore) and the off-road Munga (locally called Candango). In 1960 Vemag cars received the larger one-litre, 50 PS (37 kW) engine from the Auto Union 1000.

Vemag had a successful official racing team, with the coupe GT Malzoni, with fiberglass body. This project was the foundation of the long-lasting Brazilian sports car brand Puma. The Brazilian F94 line has been improved with several cosmetic changes and became more and more different from the German and Argentine models. Vemag had no capital to invest in new products and came under governmental pressure to merge. In 1964–1965 Volkswagen gradually took over Auto Union, a minority holder in Vemag, and in 1967 Volkswagen bought the remainder of the stock. VW quickly began phasing out DKW-Vemag production and introduced the Volkswagen 1600 sedan to the old Vemag plant, after a total of 109,343 DKW-Vemag cars had been built.

Year	1957	1958	1959	1960	1961	1962	1963	1964	1965	1966	1967	Total
Candango	8	1174	1968	2481	1582	615	20	0	0	0	0	7848
Utility Vehicle	1166	1642	Together	with	passenger	car	↓	↓	↓	↓	↓	2808
Passenger Car	0	2189	4297	7543	9337	14929	14068	12704	15260	14815	11393	106535
Cars Total	1166	3831	4297	7543	9337	14929	14068	12704	15260	14815	11393	109343
Total	1174	5006	6265	10024	10919	15544	14088	12704	15260	14815	11393	117191

Data from GEIA 1959 Data from anfavea

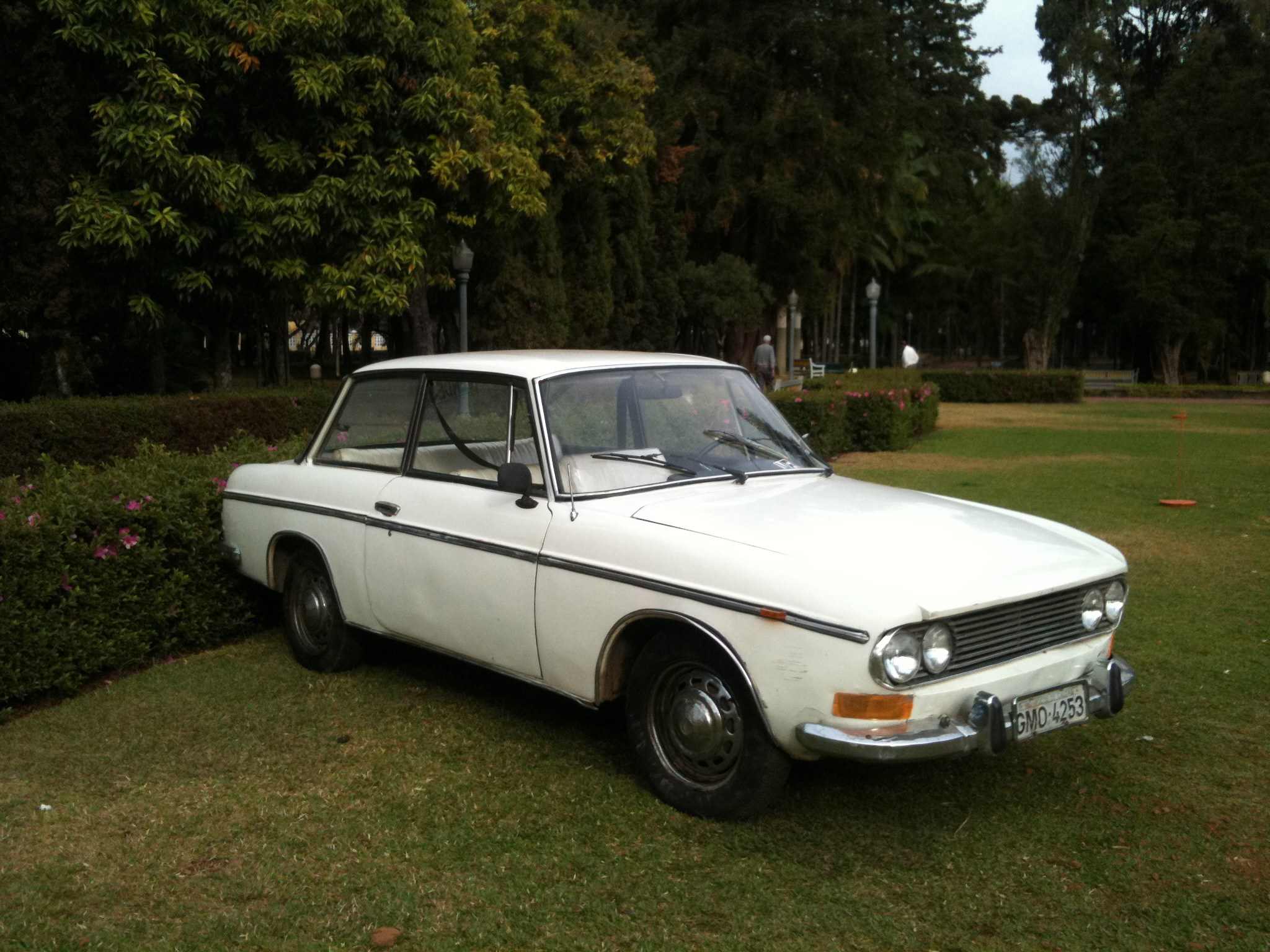
1967 DKW-Vemag Fissore

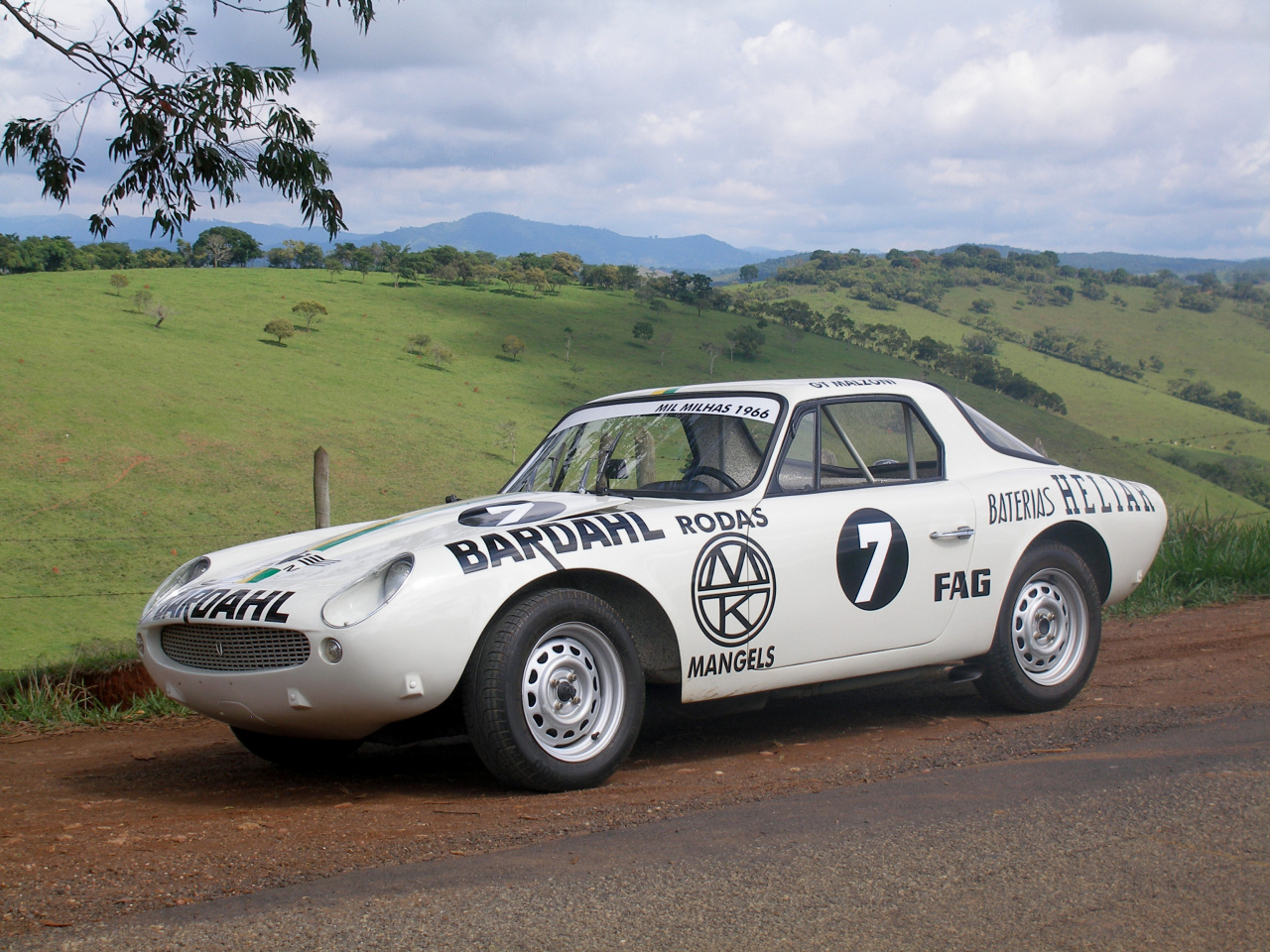
DKW GT Malzoni

- Argentina

DKW vehicles were made in Argentina from 1960 to 1969 by IASF S.A. (Industria Automotriz Santa Fe Sociedad Anónima) in Sauce Viejo, Santa Fe. The most beautiful were the Cupé Fissore, which had many famous owners (Julio Sosa, César Luis Menotti, and others). Other models are the Auto Union 1000 S Sedán (21,797 made until 1969) and the Auto Union 1000 Universal S (6,396 made until 1969). and the Auto Union Combi/Pick-up. The last version of the Auto Union Combi/Pick-up (DKW F1000 L), launched in 1969, survived a few months and was bought out by IME, which continued production until 1979.

Year	1960	1961	1962	1963	1964	1965	1966	1967	1968	1969	Total
Pick up Frontal	0	1100	600	500	942	164	100	69	35	225	3735
1000 SF	0	0	280	0	288	132	0	0	0	0	700
1000 S	904	1800	2000	2400	3350	3686	3978	2182	865	632	21797
Universal	0	150	1195	537	1440	1512	657	568	193	144	6396
Total	904	3050	4075	3437	6020	5494	4735	2819	1093	1001	32628

Data from ADEFA 1966 Data from ADEFA 1970

- Denmark

After the Netherlands, the Danes were the second largest consumers of DKW vehicles. Due to tariffs and import restrictions, DKW was forced to find a solution. Christian Bohnstedt Petersen (1894-1967) was a pioneer in Danish aviation. He had obtained the 50th Danish pilot certificate in 1918 and was a manufacturer of both bicycles, motorcycles, automobiles and aircraft. With the Christian Bohnstedt-Petersen Automobile Assembly Factory in Copenhagen, they found a partner who could assemble DKW F5 Meisterklasse cars on site in Denmark from delivered parts. The wooden bodies delivered from Zwickau were mounted onto the also delivered chassis. Subsequently, the artificial leather upholstery was nailed on. After the installation of the engine and electrical system, one vehicle could be delivered per hour. Production was halted after the German Wehrmacht occupied Copenhagen in April 1940. By then, about 3,000 vehicles had been produced. In addition, a few F7 and F8 were built with steel bodies by M.C. Christensen near the city of Silkeborg.

A fifteen-minute film by the Danish Broadcasting Corporation from 1938 shows the following details: View of the free port Frihavnen. Coachwork for DKW cars unloaded from carriages in Frihavnen and transported by lorry to Bohnstedt-Petersen's factory. On the first floor of the factory, the DKW cars are assembled by upholsterers, cabinet makers, mechanics and others who assemble the cars manually. The finished cars are driven down a slideway to the yard where they are filled up with petrol. The cars in the streets of Copenhagen.

- Switzerland

Holka AG

- Australia

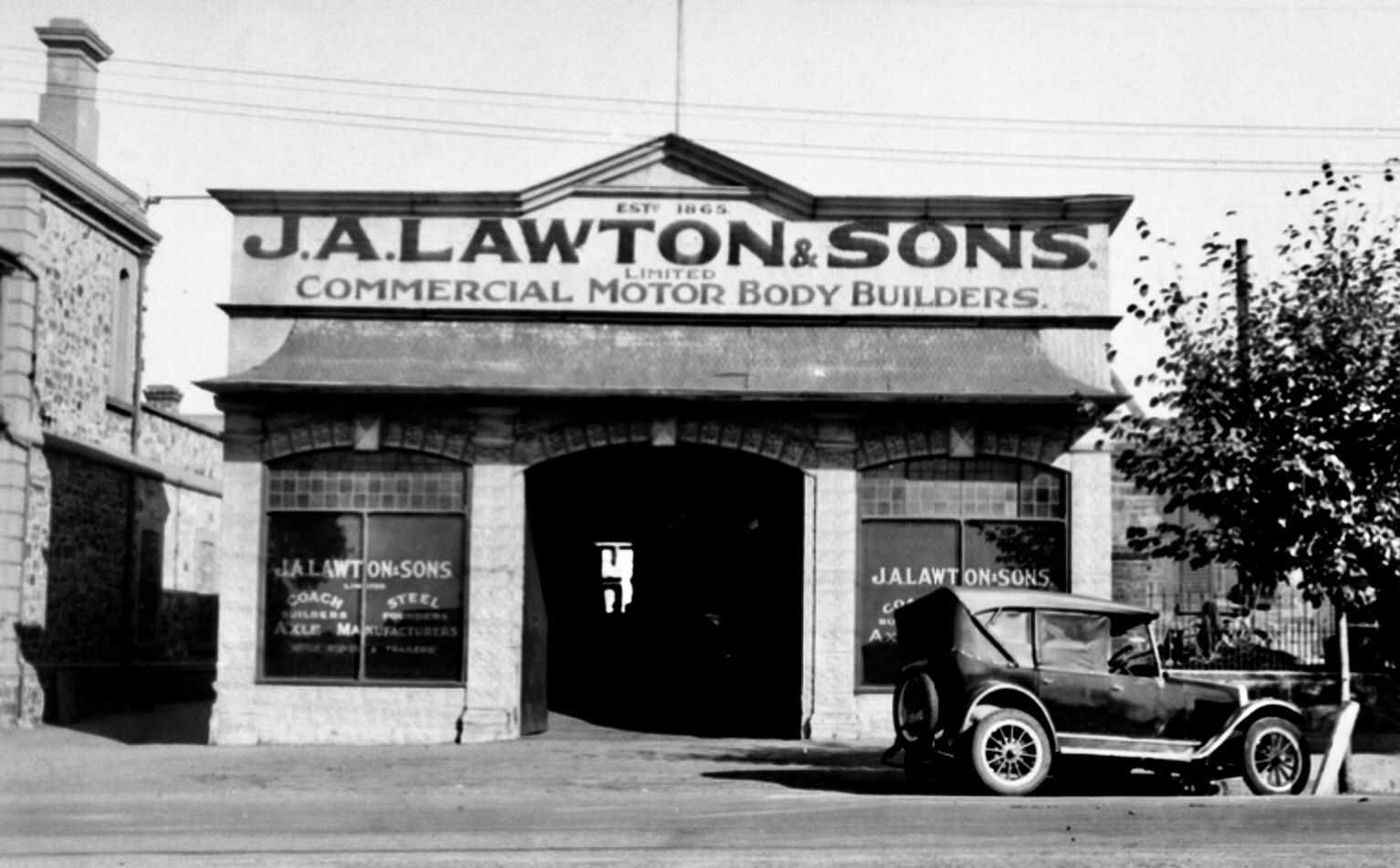
DKW Australia, J. A. Lawton and Sons, North Terrace, Adelaide, Founded in 1865

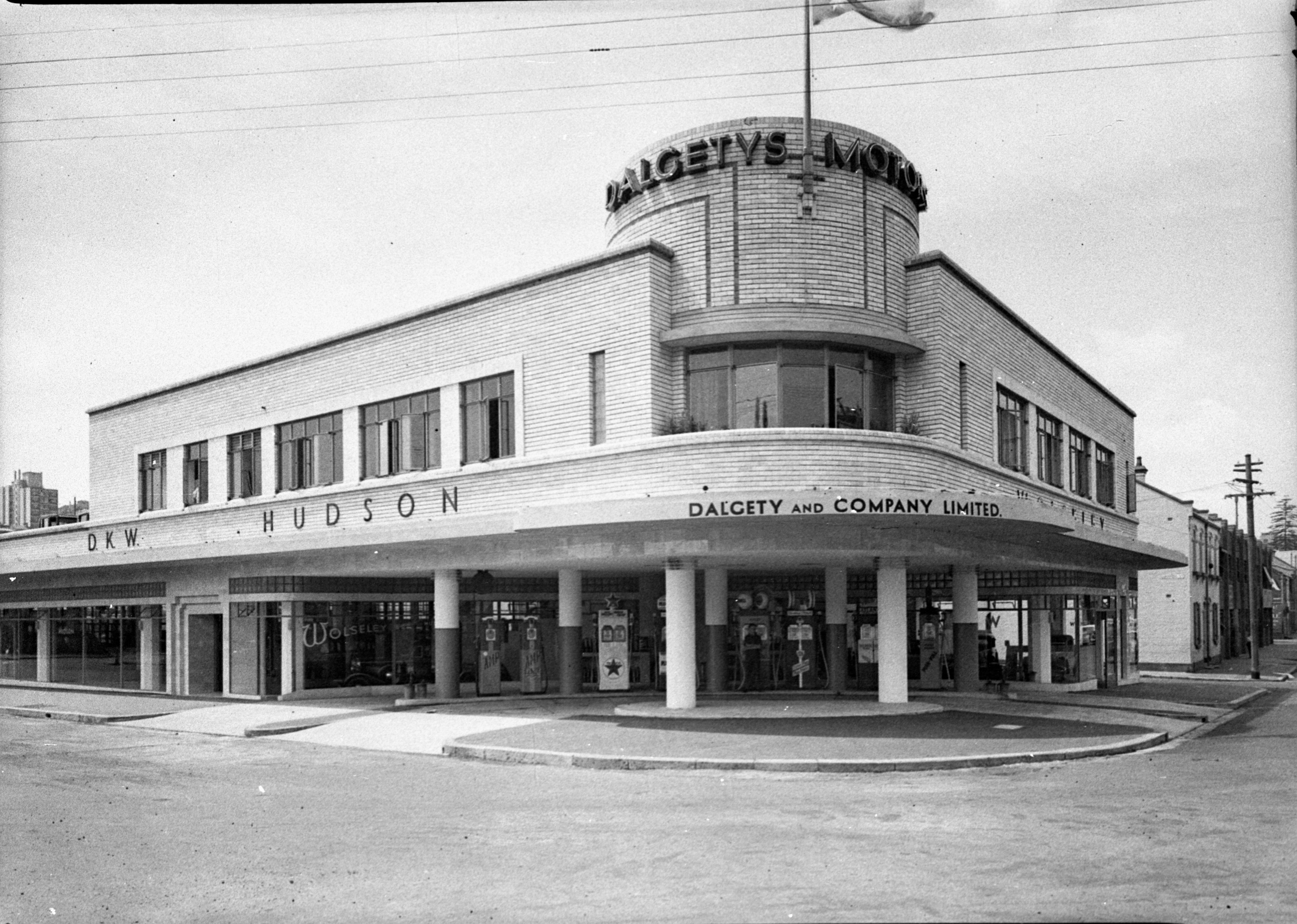
DKW, Hudson and Wolseley car showrooms, Woolloomooloo, Sydney, November 1938

J. A. Lawton and Sons was a company that supplied bodies for the chassis delivered from Germany. A vehicle with an F7 pickup body is documented. The company from Adelaide, which was located on North Terrace, was already founded in 1865. Another supplier of vehicle bodies was Kellow Falkiner from Melbourne.

- Czechoslovakia

Jawa

- Yugoslavia

The company Agroservice from the Slovenian town of Novo Mesto started as a maintenance company for agricultural machines. Under the new name Moto Montaza, CKD assembly of DKW vans began in 1955. In 1959, the company was renamed IMV (Industrija Motornih Vozil). From 1962, DKW passenger cars were assembled from CKD kits. In 1962, a transport vehicle was developed that bore a visual resemblance to the Barkas B 1000. The technical components such as the engine, axles, and other chassis parts continued to come from DKW. The engine of the vehicle called IMV 1000 had a displacement of 981 cc and initially produced 39 hp. Later, up to 44 hp was also achieved. This was sufficient for 100 to 105 km/h. In 1972, engines from British Leyland were supplied for this vehicle. The vehicle designation changed to IMV 1600 B. It is therefore assumed that there was a supply stop by DKW at the end of 1971. The production capacity of IMV was a maximum of 1500 vehicles per year. Exports went to Czechoslovakia and Austria. In Austria, the transporter was sold as Donau 1000.

== Vans and utility vehicles ==
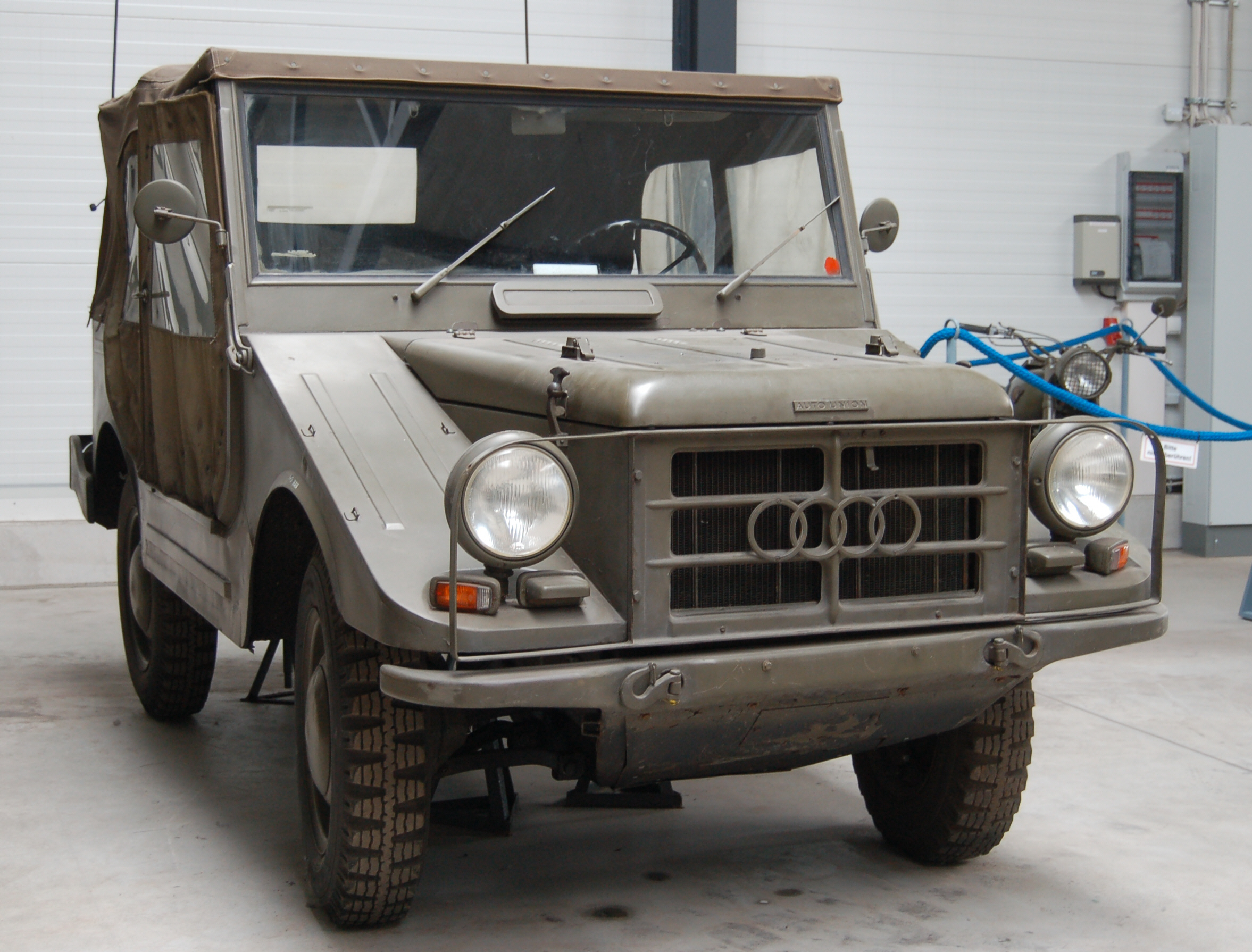
DKW Munga

The DKW Munga was built by Auto Union in Ingolstadt. Production began in October 1956 and ended in December 1968, with 46,750 cars built.

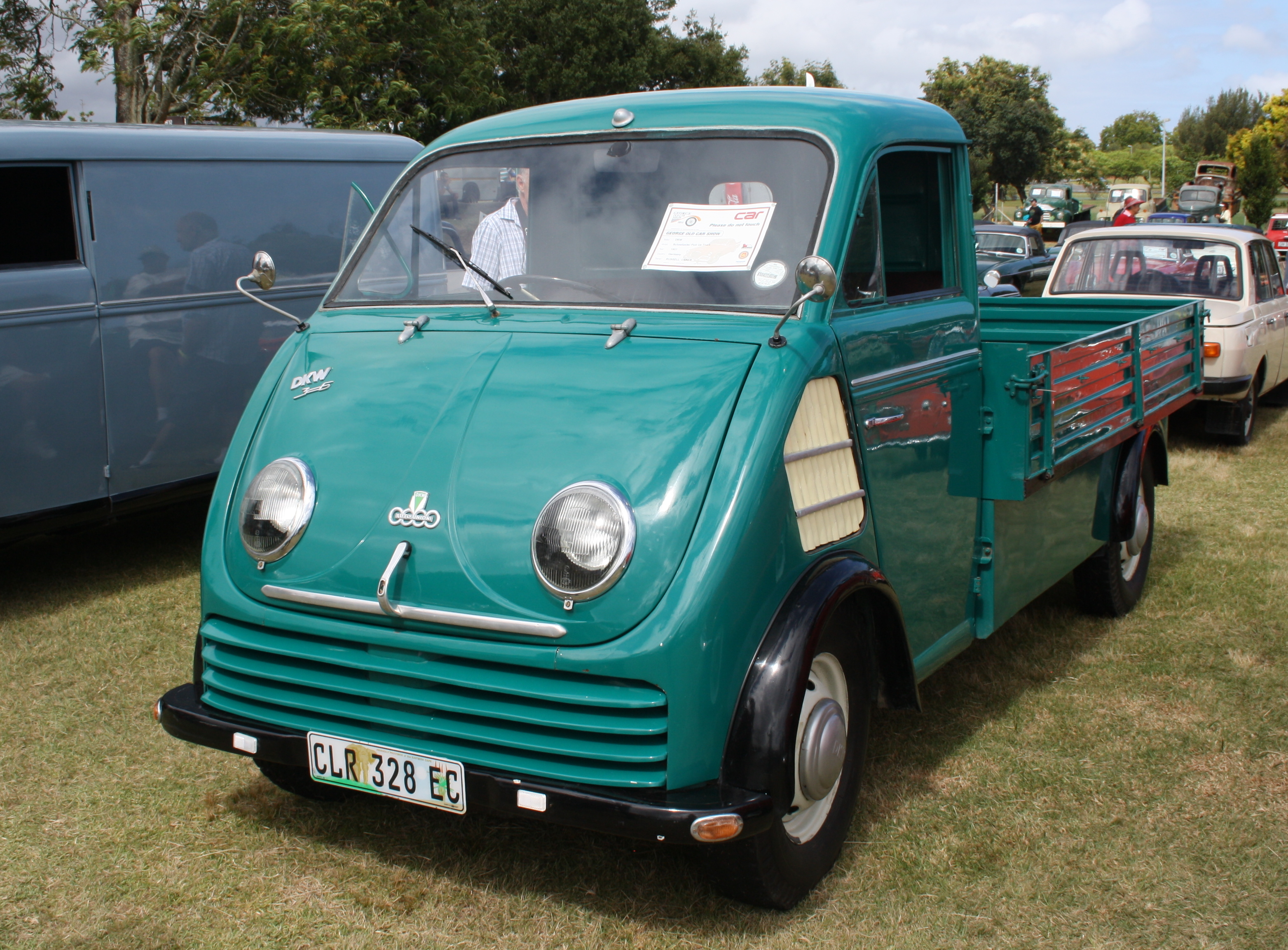
DKW F800/3 Schnellaster

From 1949 to 1962, DKW produced the Schnellaster with a trailing-arm rear suspension system with springs in the cross bar assembly. Spanish subsidiary IMOSA produced a modern successor introduced in 1963, the DKW F 1000 L. This van started with the three-cylinder 1,000 cc engine, but later received a Mercedes-Benz Diesel engine and was renamed a Mercedes-Benz in 1975.

== Motorcycles ==
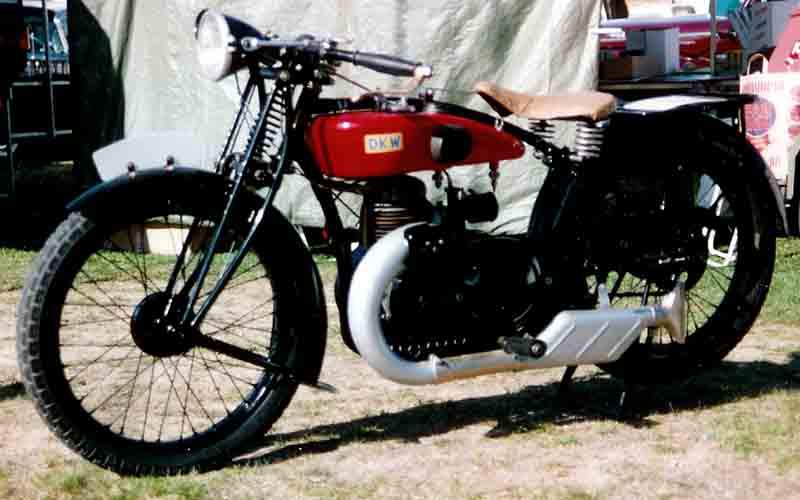
DKW

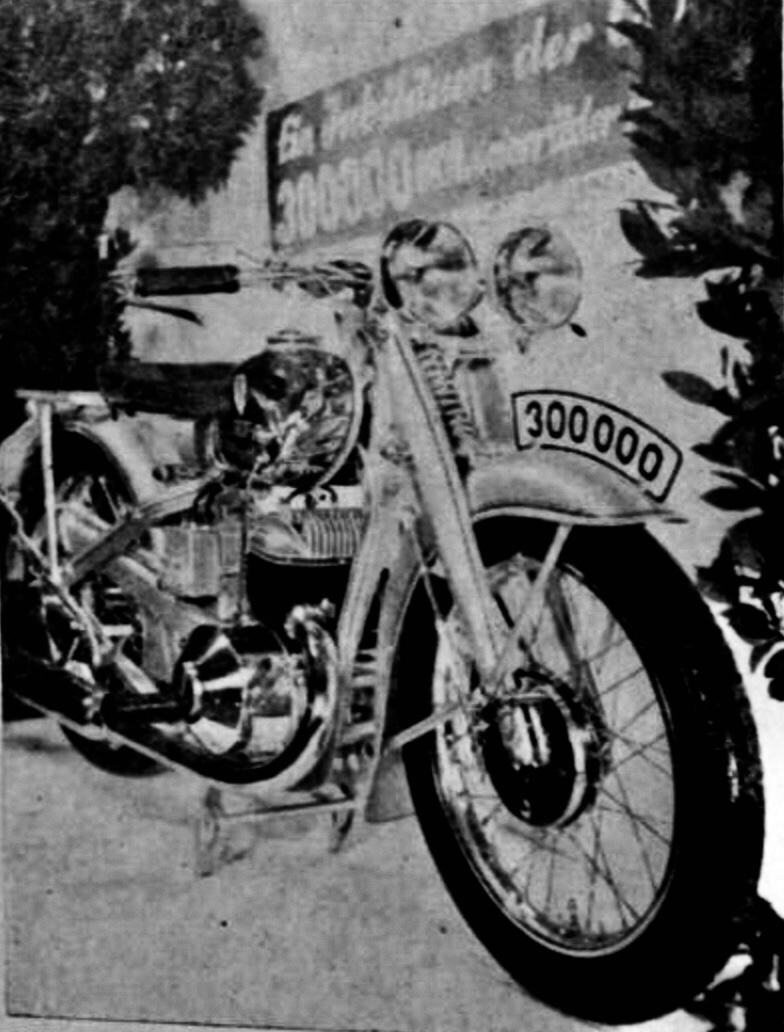
Jubilee DKW motorcycle No. 300,000 (1936)

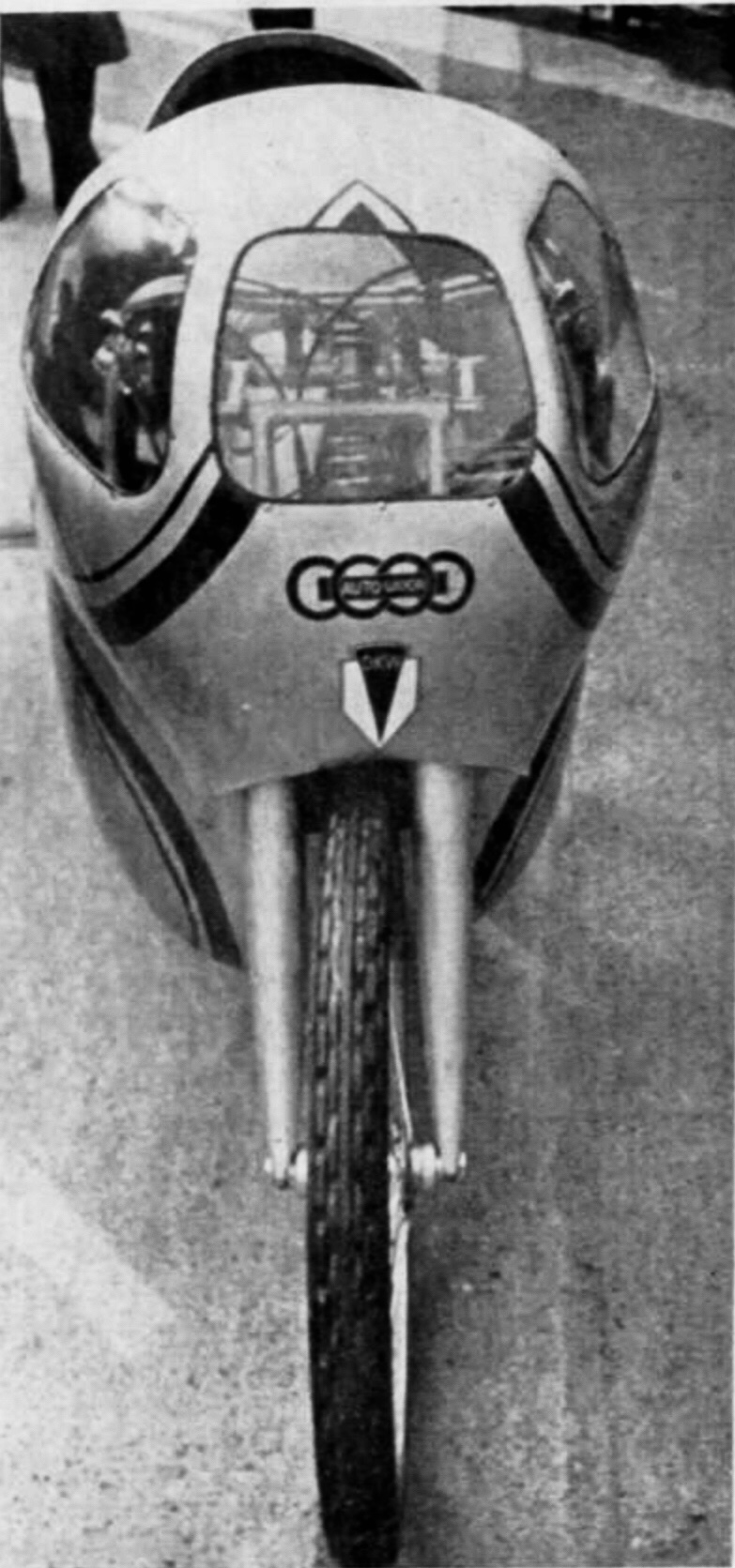
Windshield DKW Record Motorcycle (1937)

During the late 1920s and until WWII broke out, DKW was both the world's largest motorcycle manufacturer, as well as Europe's pioneer of front-wheel drive automobiles with their successful 1931 and later DKW Front models, before the 1932 Adler Trumpf and the 1934 Citroen Traction Avant. In 1931, Arnold Zoller started building split-singles and this concept made DKW the dominant racing motorcycle in the Lightweight and Junior classes between the wars. This included off-road events like the International Six Days Trial where the marque scored some considerable inter-war year successes alongside Bavarian Motor Works At the same time, the company also had some success with super-charged racing motorcycles which because of their light weight were particularly successful in the ISDT

The motorcycle branch produced famous models such as the RT 125 pre- and post-World War II, and after the war with production at the original factory in GDR becoming MZ it made 175, 250 and 350 (cc) models. As war reparations, the design drawings of the RT 125 were given to Harley-Davidson in the US and BSA in the UK. The Harley-Davidson version was known loosely as the Hummer (Hummer is really just a few specific years, but generally people call the Harley lightweights Hummers), while BSA used them for the Bantam. IFA and later MZ models continued in production until the 1990s, when economics brought production of the two stroke to an end. Other manufacturers copied the DKW design, officially or otherwise. This can be seen in the similarity of many small two-stroke motorcycles from the 1950s, including from Yamaha, Voskhod, Maserati and Polish WSK.

== Cars ==
=== Pre-war production ===
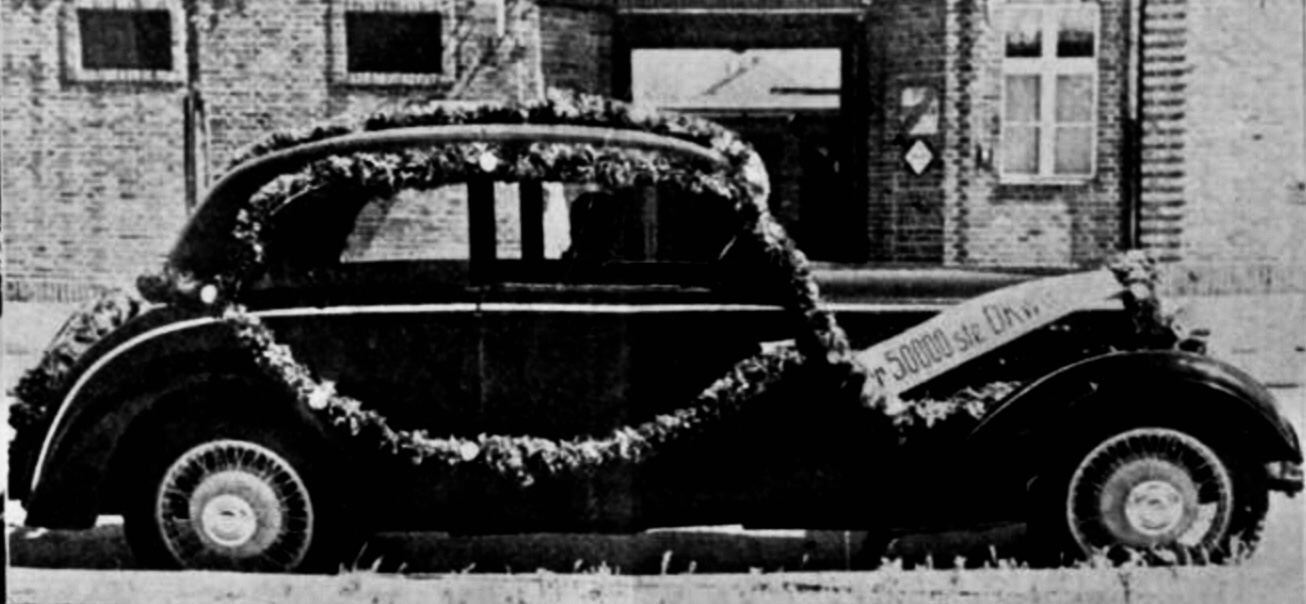
DKW Anniversary car No. 50,000 (1936)

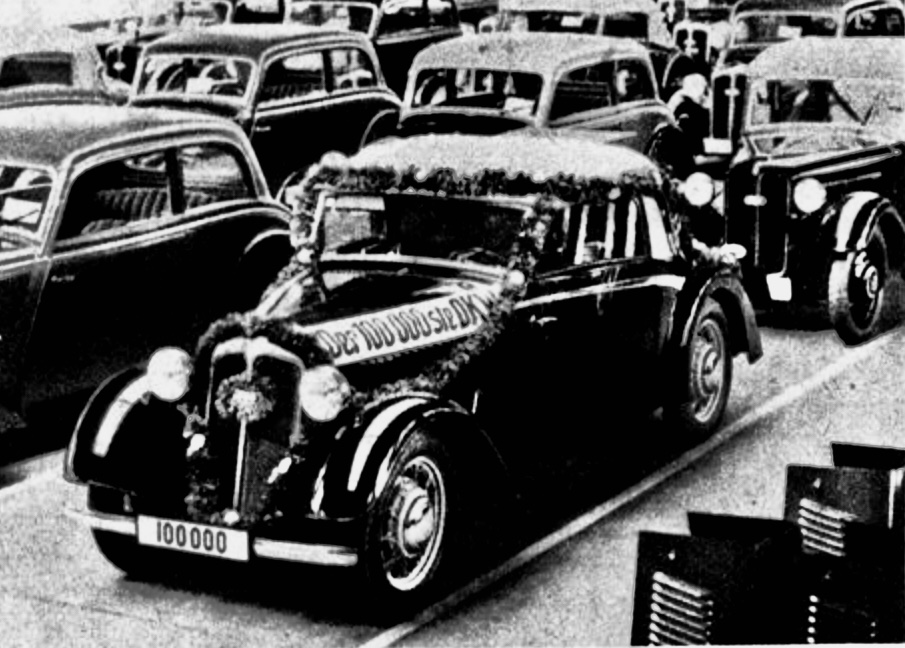
DKW Anniversary car No. 100,000 (1936)

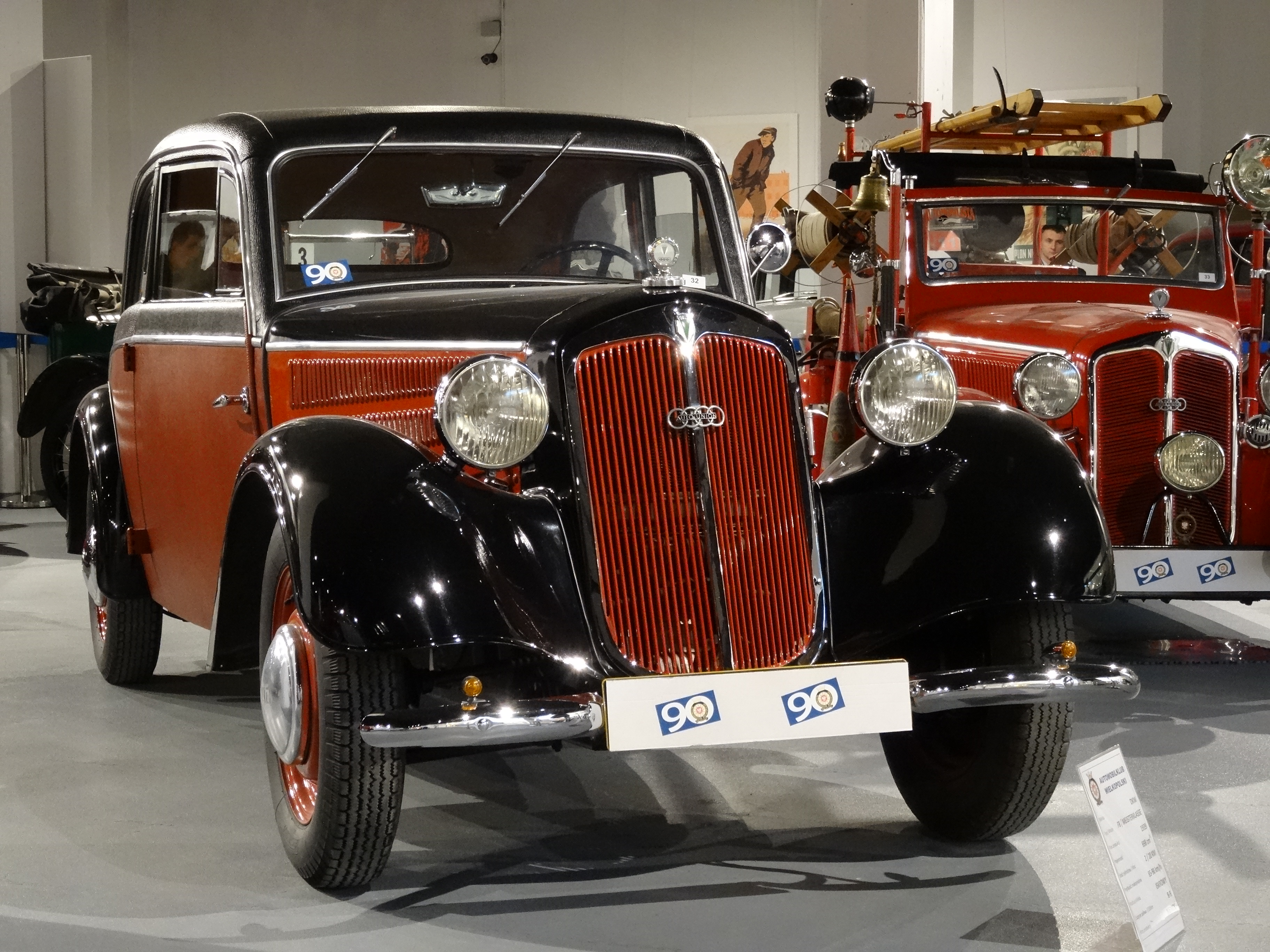
DKW F8 Meisterklasse (1938–1942)

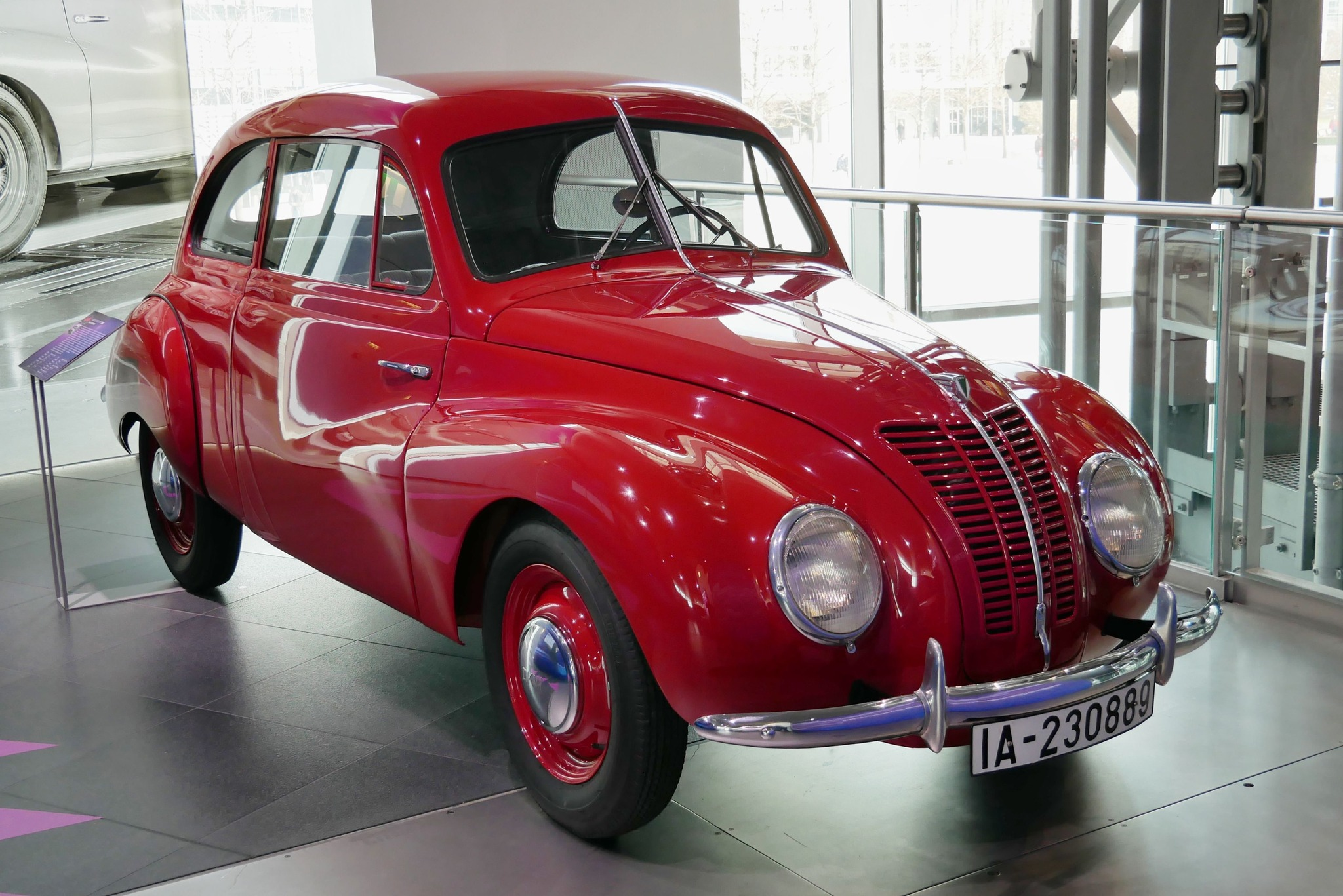
DKW F9 Prototyp (1939–1942)

- DKW Typ P (1928–1933) 5,228 units
- DKW Typ 4=8 (1930–1932) 4,693 units
- Sonderklasse 432 (1932–1933) 966 units
- Sonderklasse 1001, Sonderklasse 1002 (1933–1935) 6,264 units
- Schwebeklasse (1934–1937) 6,999 units
- Sonderklasse 37 (1937–1940) 10,472 units
- DKW F1 (1931–1932) 4,353 units
- DKW F2 Meisterklasse (1932–1935) 8,441 units
- DKW F2 Reichsklasse (1933–1935) 18,591 units
- DKW F3 (1933-1935) 224 units
- DKW F4 (1934–1935) 7,900 units
- DKW F5 Reichsklasse (1935–1937) 30,596 units
- DKW F5 Meisterklasse (1935–1937) 32,901 units
- DKW F5 Cabriolet (1935–1938) 6,374 units
- DKW F5 Einheits two seater (1935–1936) 998 units
- DKW F5K 600 (1936–1937) 1,450 units
- DKW F5K 700 (1936–1937) 1,166 units
- DKW F5 Roadster (1935–1938) 407 units
- DKW F5 Lieferwagen (1935–1937) 765 units
- DKW F6 ≈(1936) ? units
- DKW F7 Reichsklasse (1936–1939) 50,842 units
- DKW F7 Meisterklasse (1937–1939) 41,656 units
- DKW F7 Cabriolet (1937–1939) 2,941 units
- DKW F7 Lieferwagen (1937–1939) 2,266 units
- DKW F8 Reichsklasse (1938–1942) 14,750 units into the war.
- DKW F8 Meisterklasse (1938–1942) 19,405 units into the war.
- DKW F8 Meister Super (1939–1941) 1,379 units into the war.
- DKW F8 Cabriolet (1938–1942) 3,436 units into the war.
- DKW F8 Lieferwagen (1939–1942) 9,517 units into the war.
- DKW F9 prototype (1939-1942) 12 units

Production figures for DKW cars in 1933 amounted to 16,000 vehicles. Pre-war and war-years production of civilian models totalled almost 250,000 units, of which some 218,000 were front-wheel driven.

=== Post-war ===
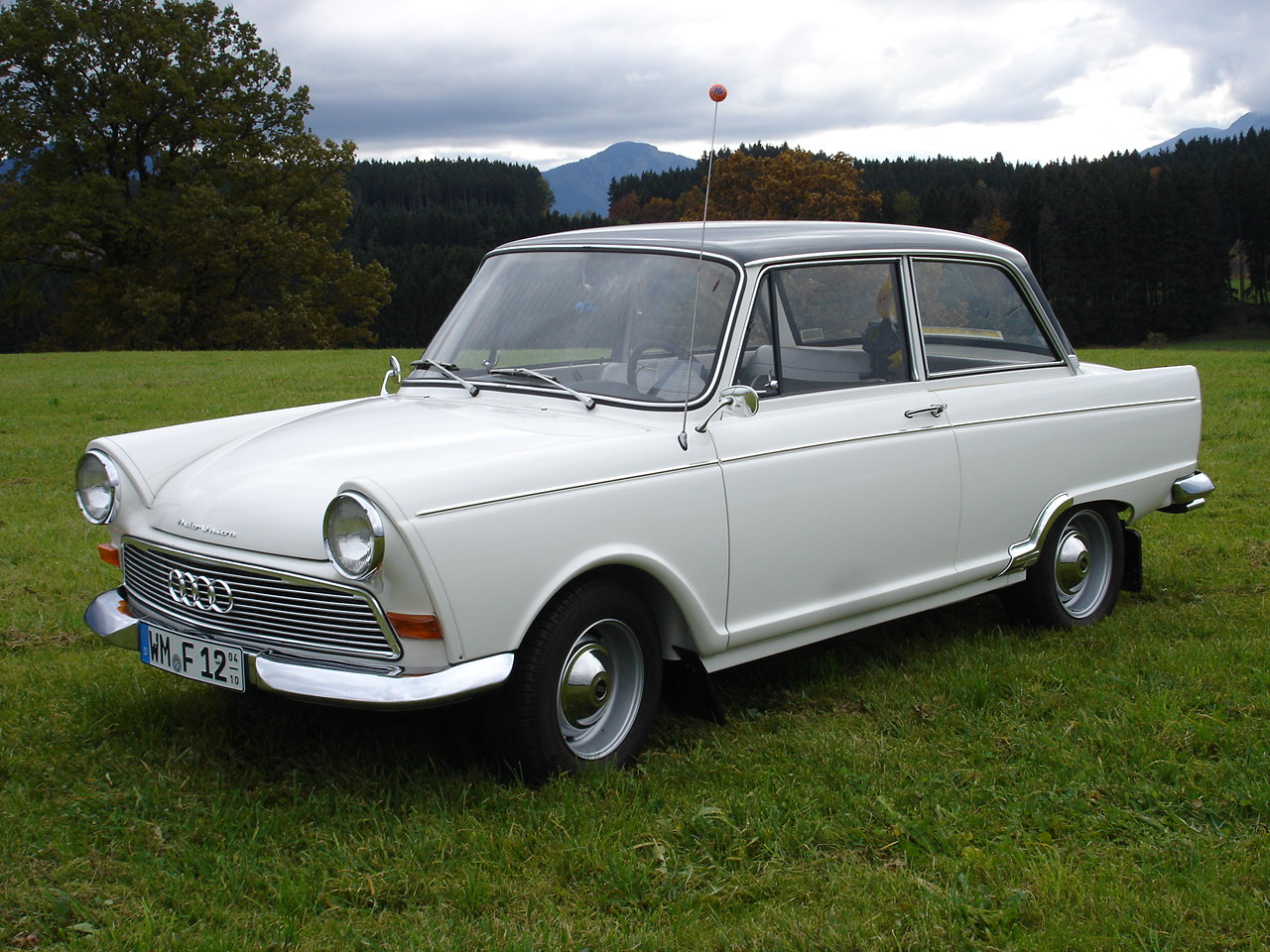
DKW F12 Saloon (1963–1965)

- DKW Schnellaster van (1949–1962)
- DKW F10 (1950)
- DKW F89 (1950–1954)
- DKW 3=6 (F91/F93/F94) (1953–1959)
- DKW Monza (1956–1958)
- DKW Munga off-road (1956–1968)
- DKW Junior (F11/F12) (1959–1965)
- DKW F102 (1963–1966)

== Motorcycles and scooters ==
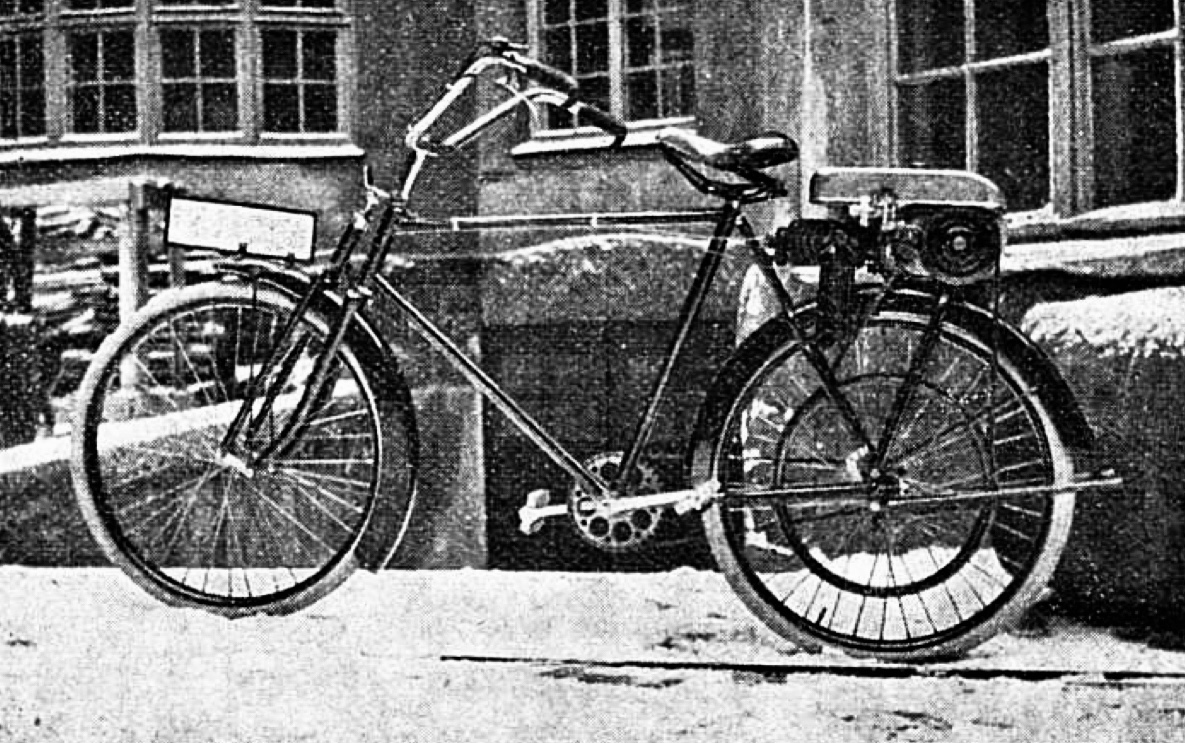
DKW Fahrradhilfsmotor M (1919-1923)

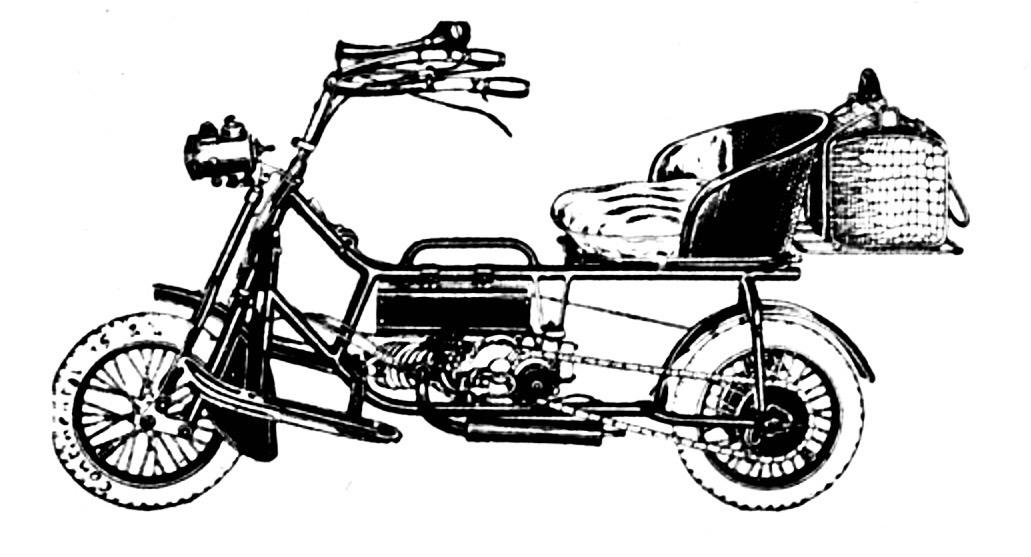
DKW Golem (1921-1922)

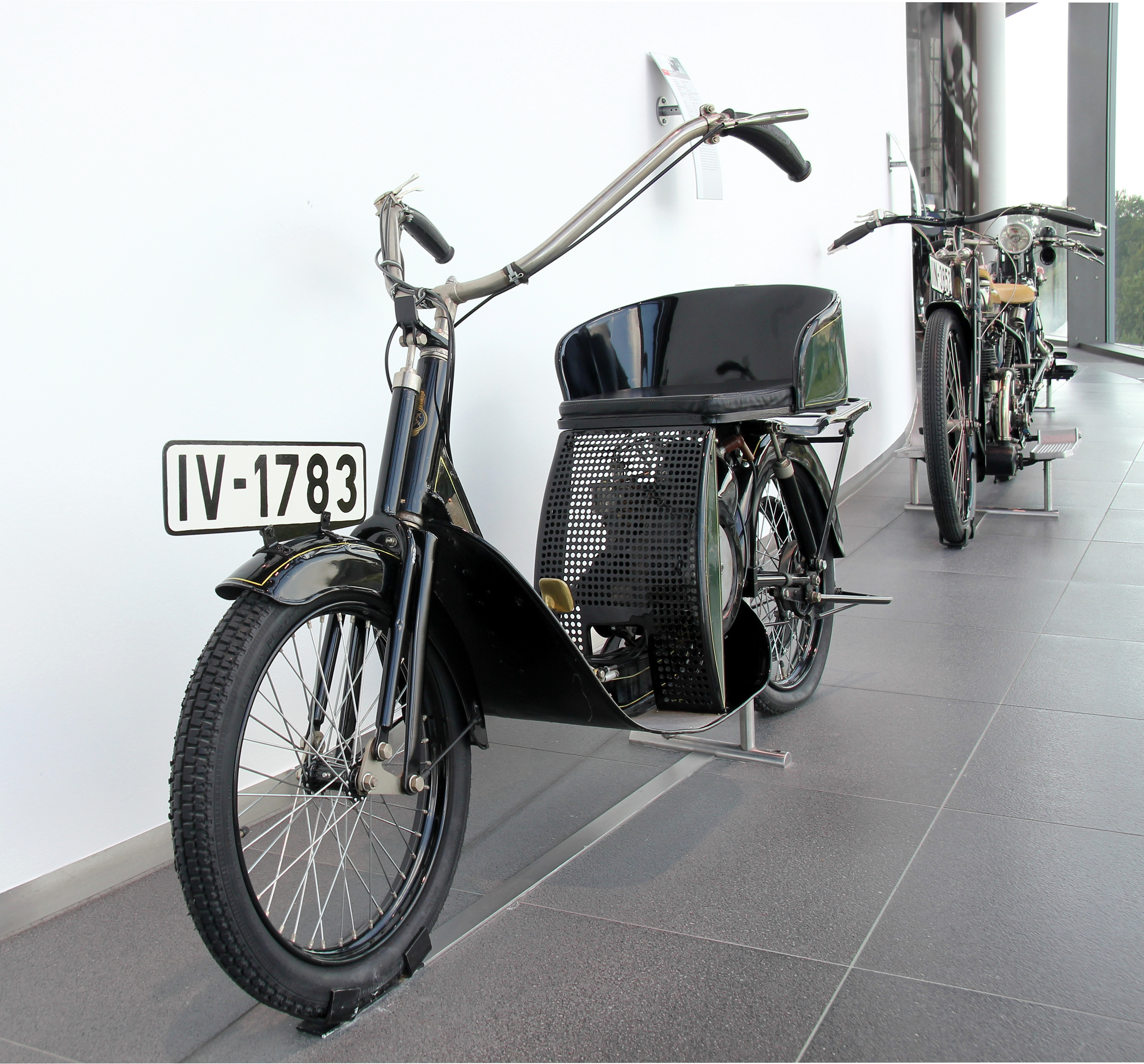
DKW Lomos

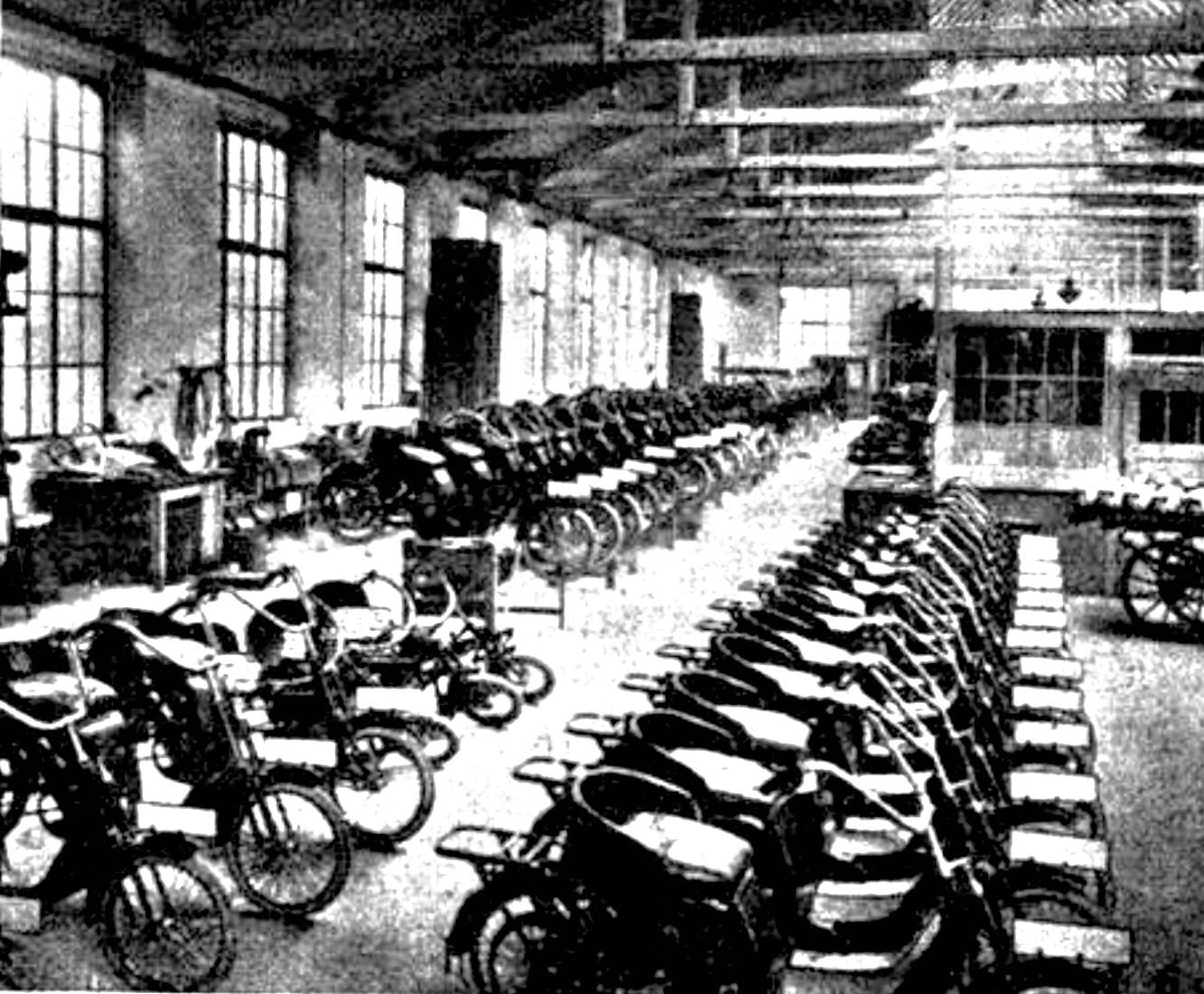
DKW Lomos Production 1923

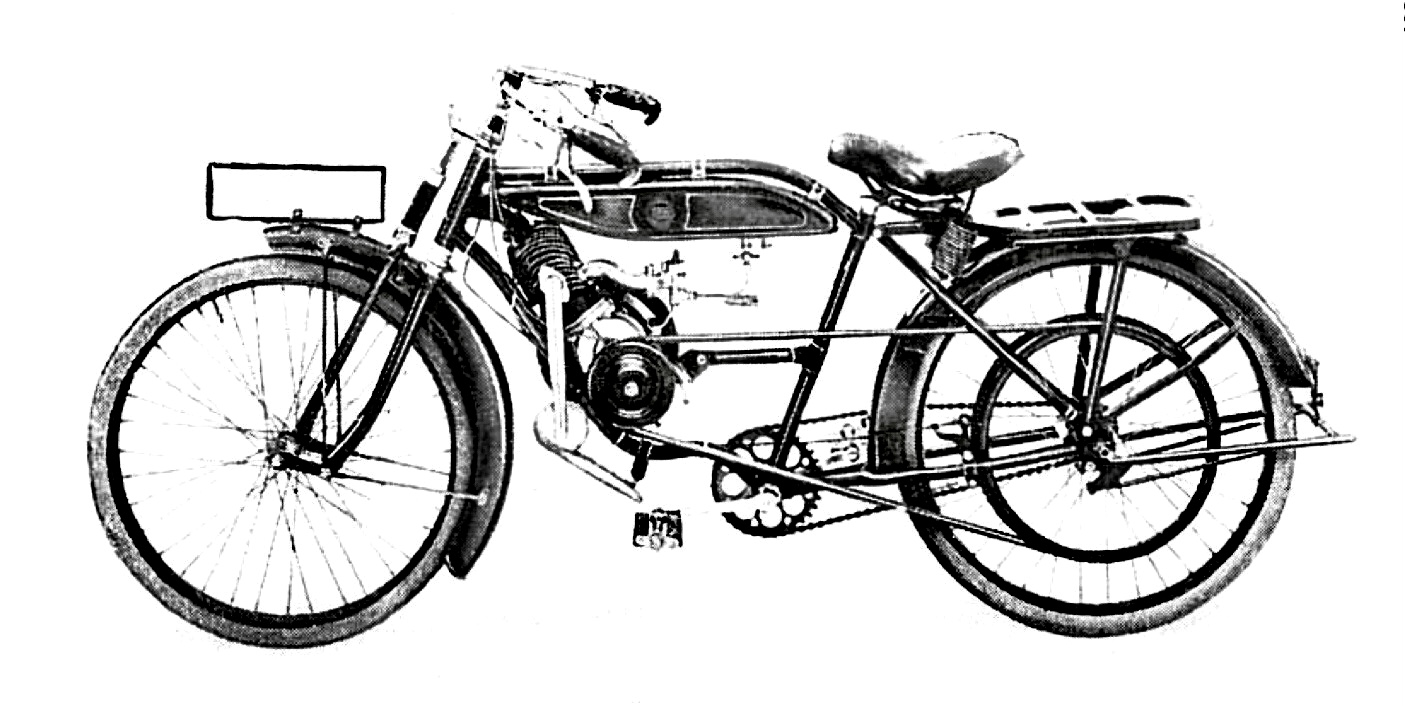
DKW Reichsfahrtmodell RM (1922-1924) RM25 (1925)

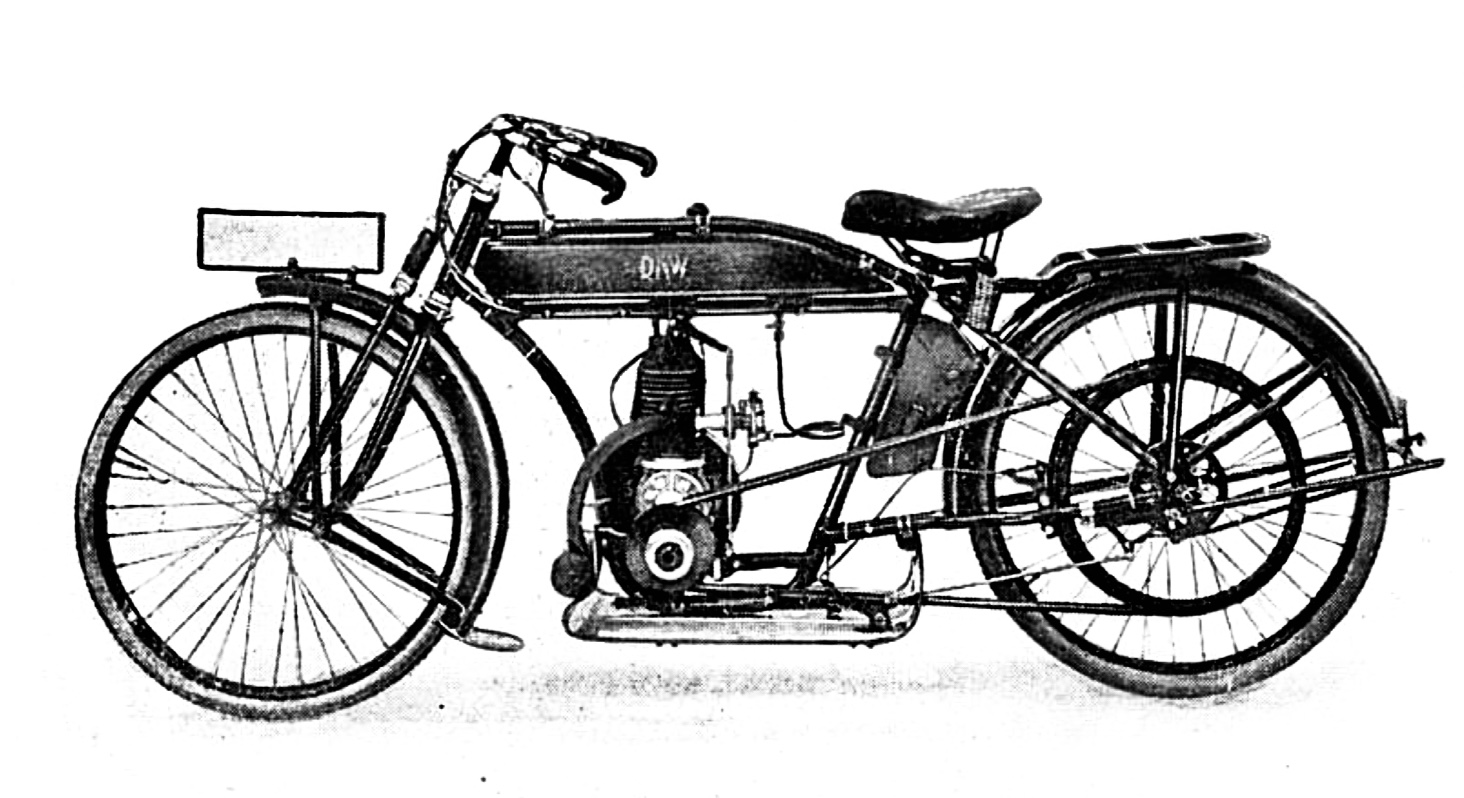
DKW ZM (1924-1925)

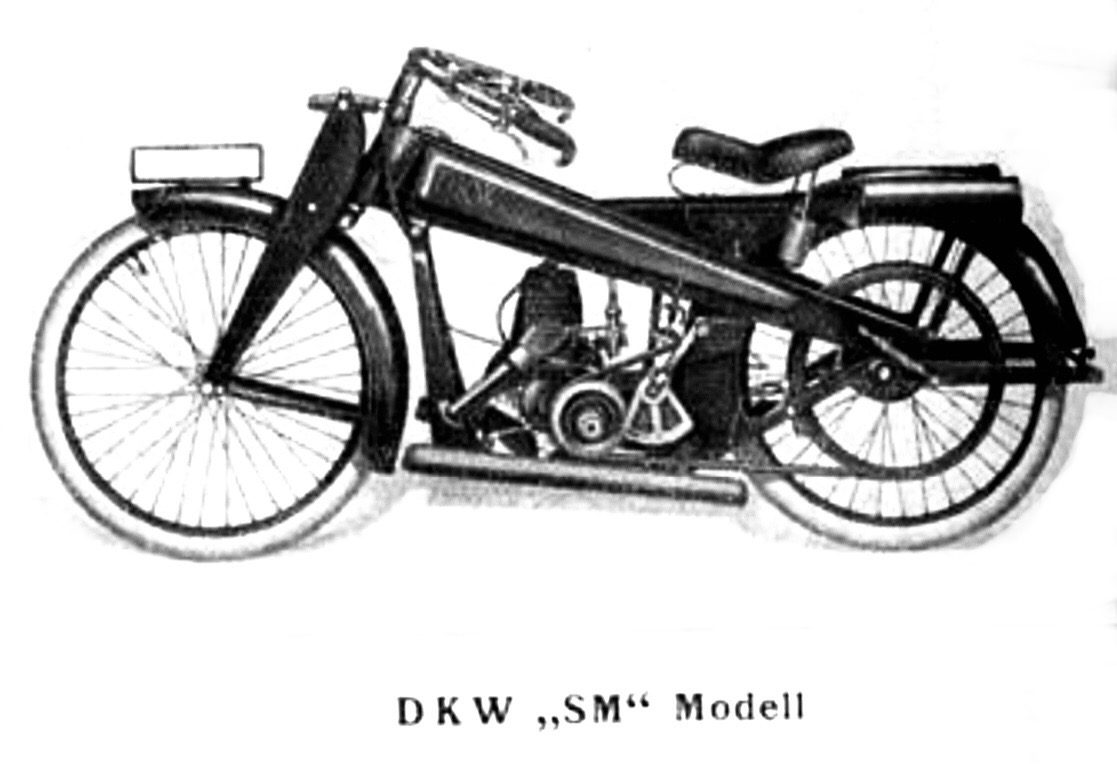
DKW SM (1924-1925)

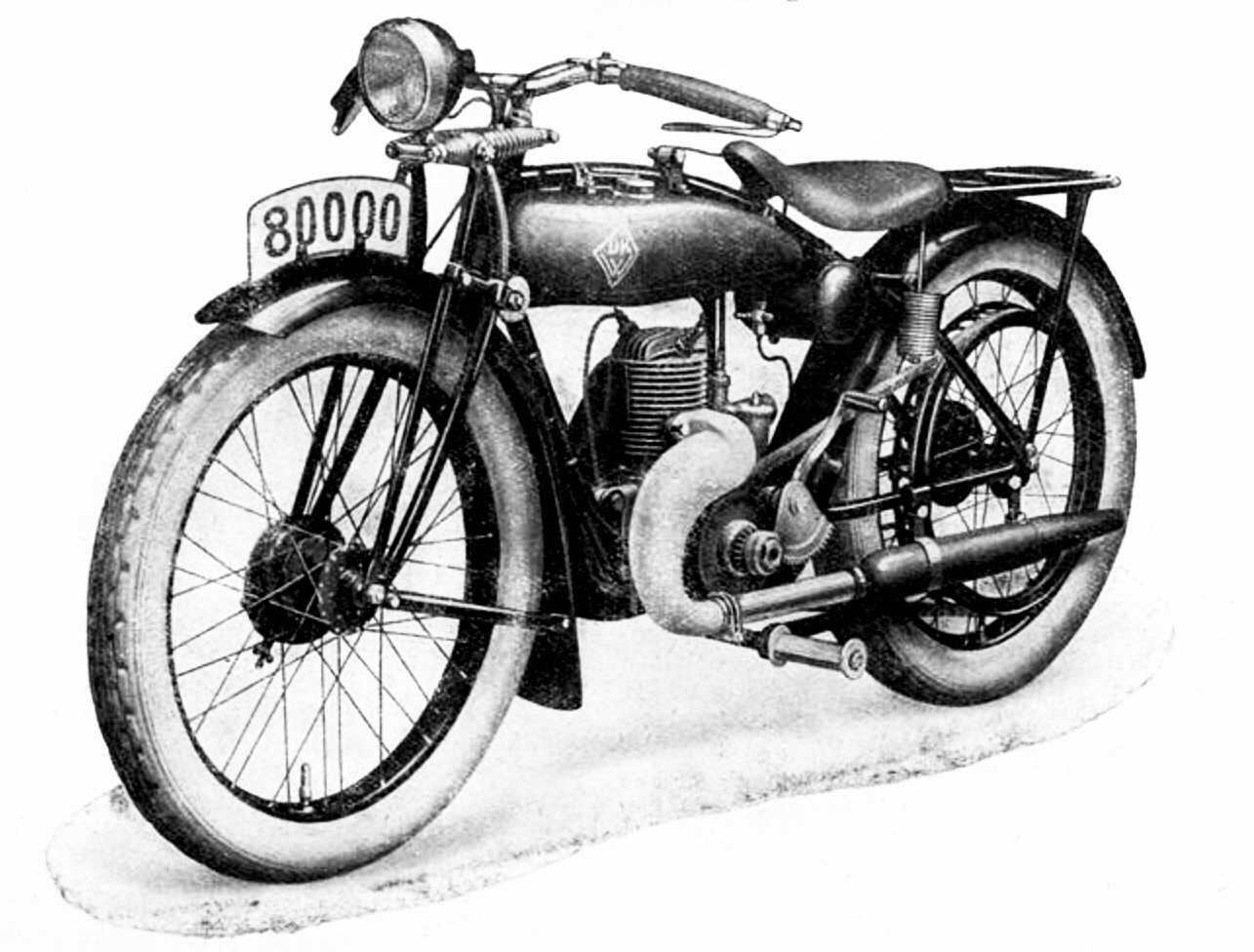
Jubilee No. 80.000 DKW E206 Sport (1925-1928)

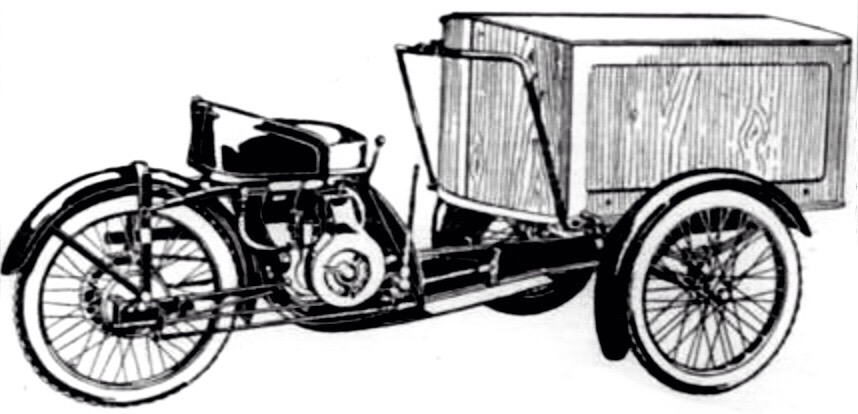
DKW Transportrad (1925-1926)

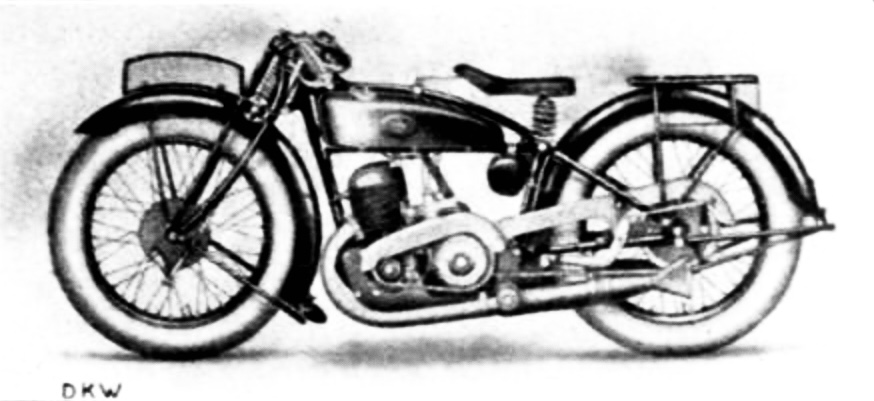
DKW Z 500 (1926-1928)

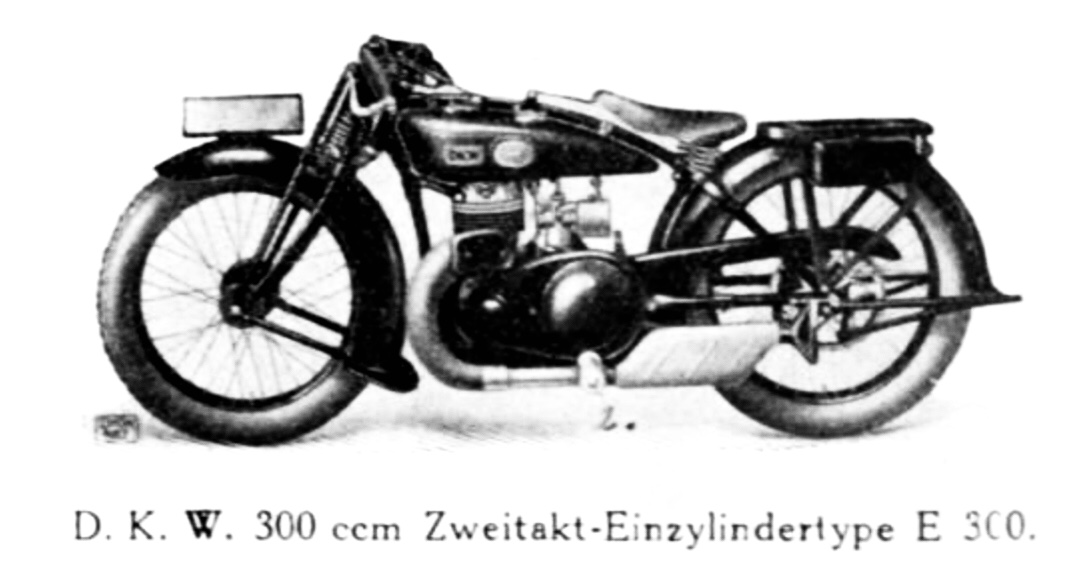
DKW E 300 (1928-1929)

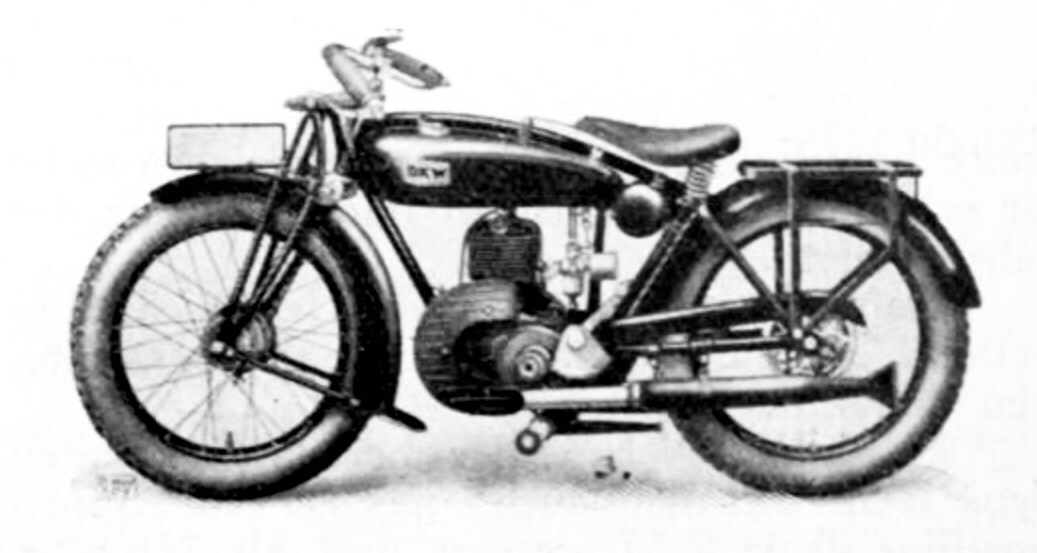
DKW E 200 (1928-1929)

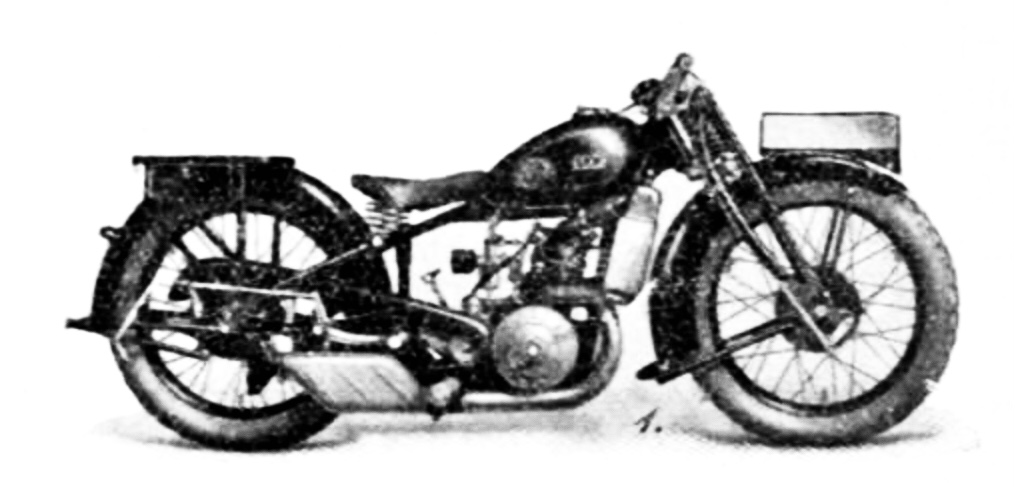
DKW ZSW 500 (1928-1929)

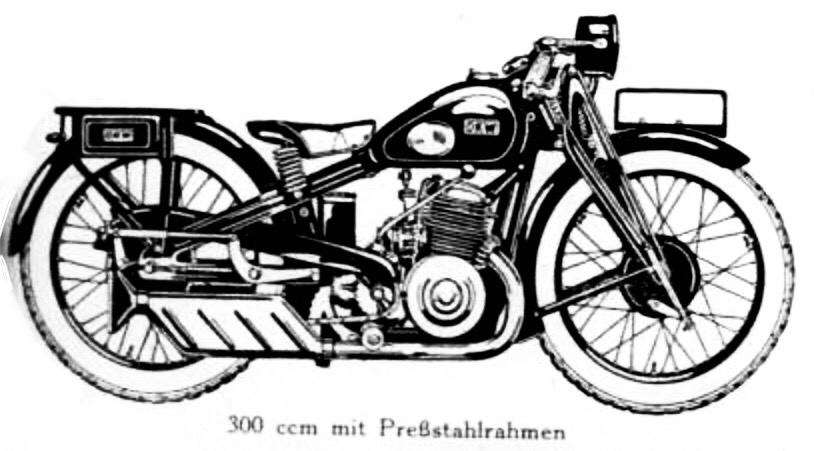
DKW Luxus 300 (1929-1930)

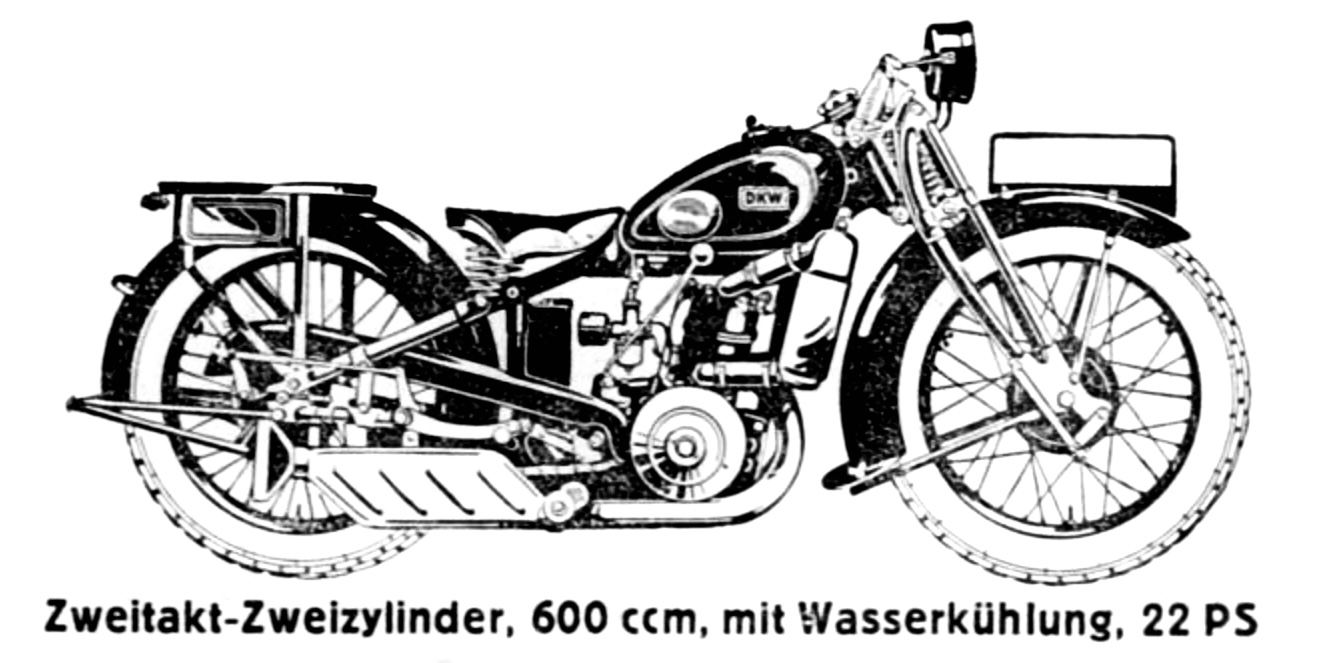
DKW Super Sport 600 (1931-1932) The engine with 584 cc comes from the car type P and was thus the motorcycle with the largest displacement from DKW. The engine of the flagship produced 22 horsepower. Like the 500, it was also available with a sidecar from the factory. The selling prices were at 400 RM.

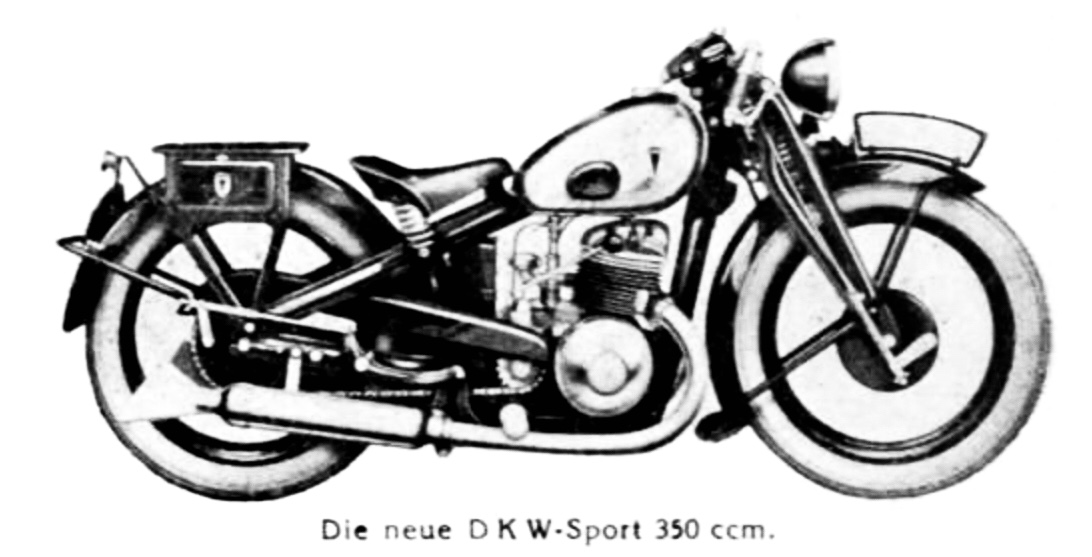
DKW Sport 350 (1933)

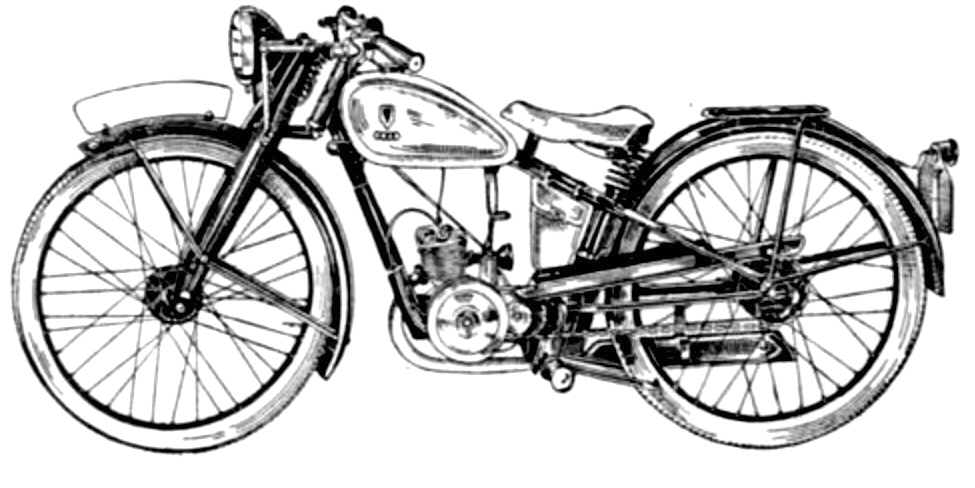
DKW RT 100 (1934-1936)

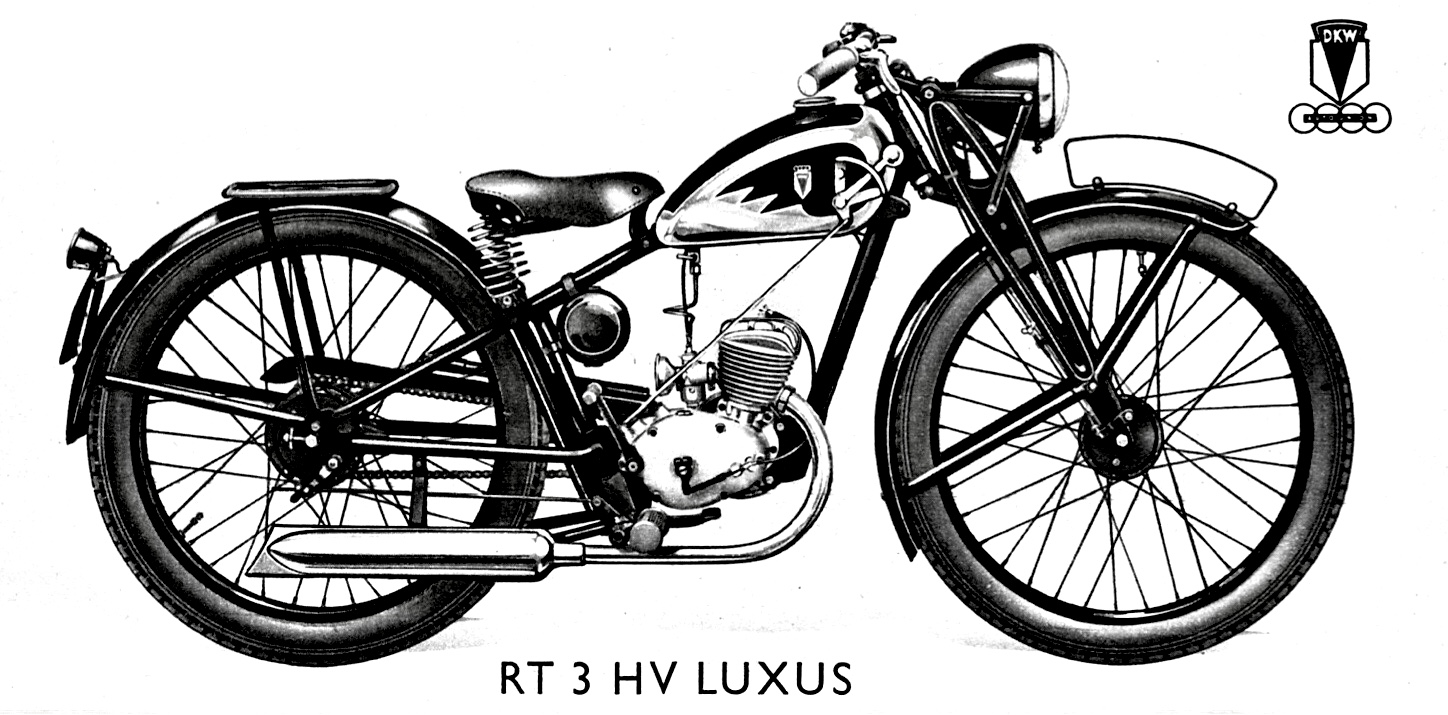
DKW RT 3 PS (1936-1940)

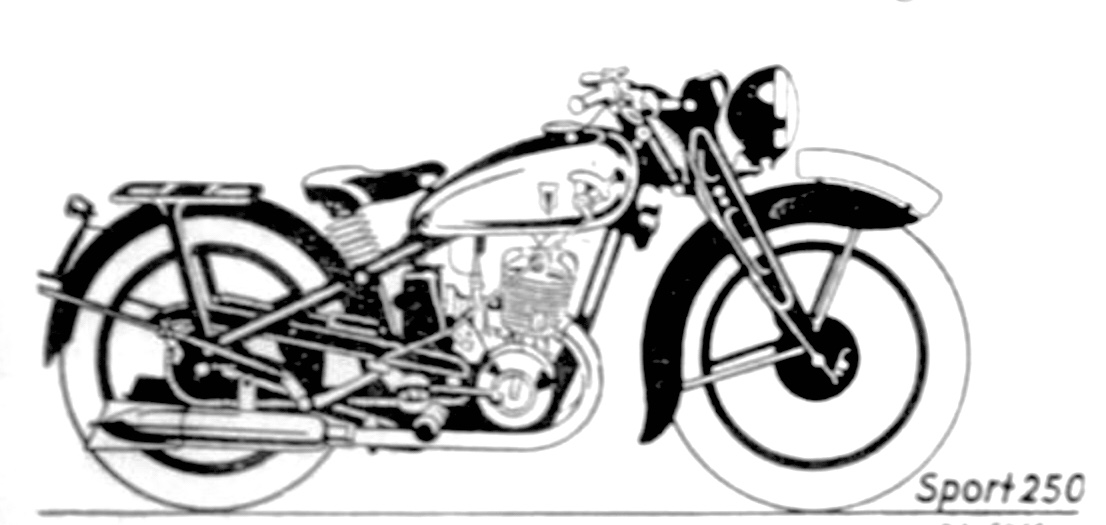
DKW Sport 250 (1938)

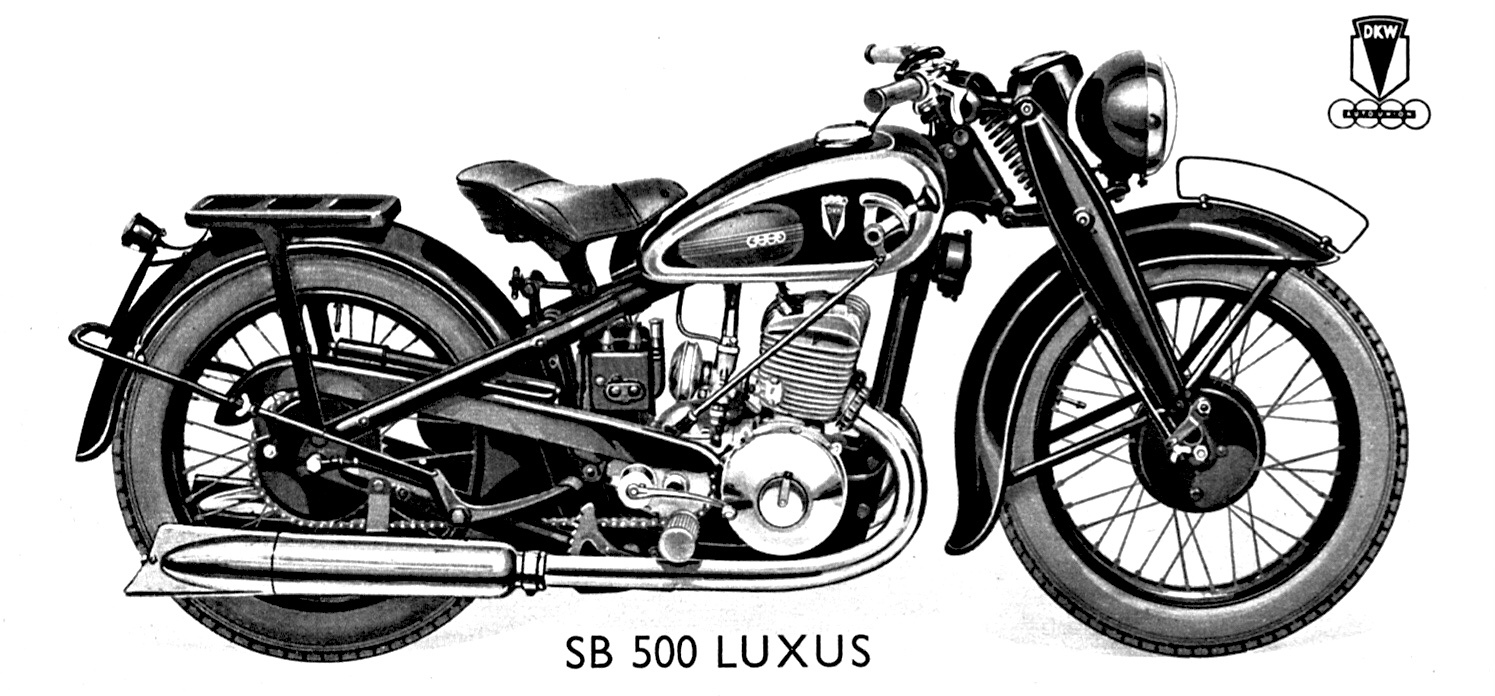
DKW SB 500 (1936-1939)

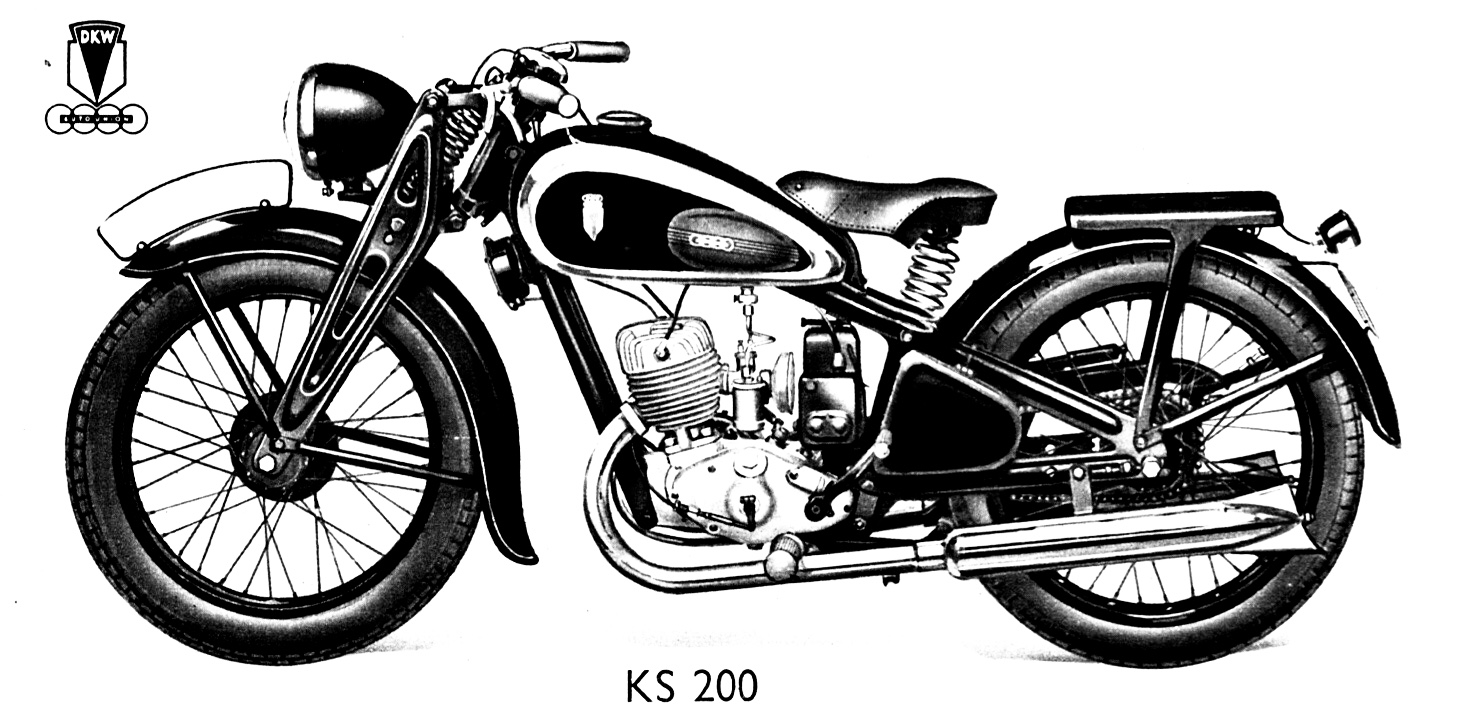
DKW KS 200 (1936-1940)

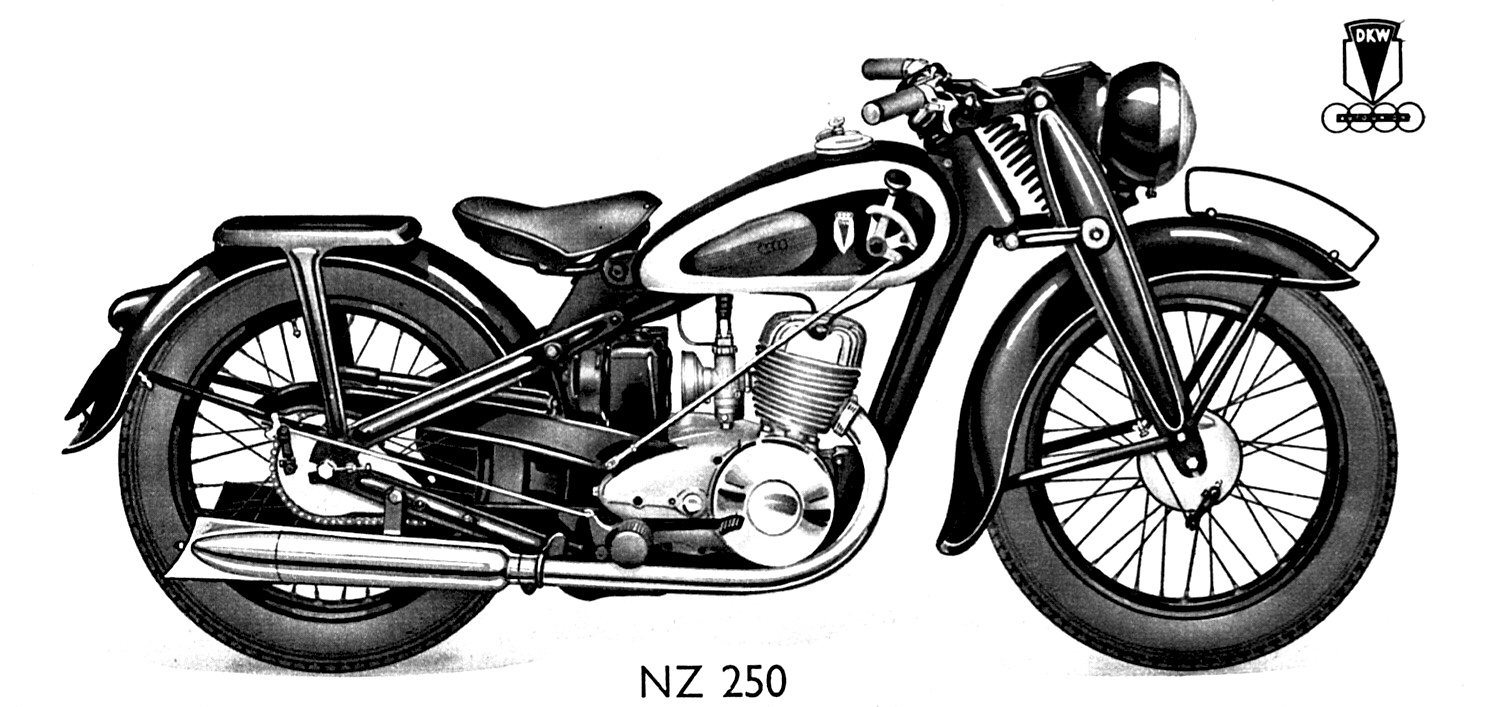
DKW NZ 250 (1938-1941)

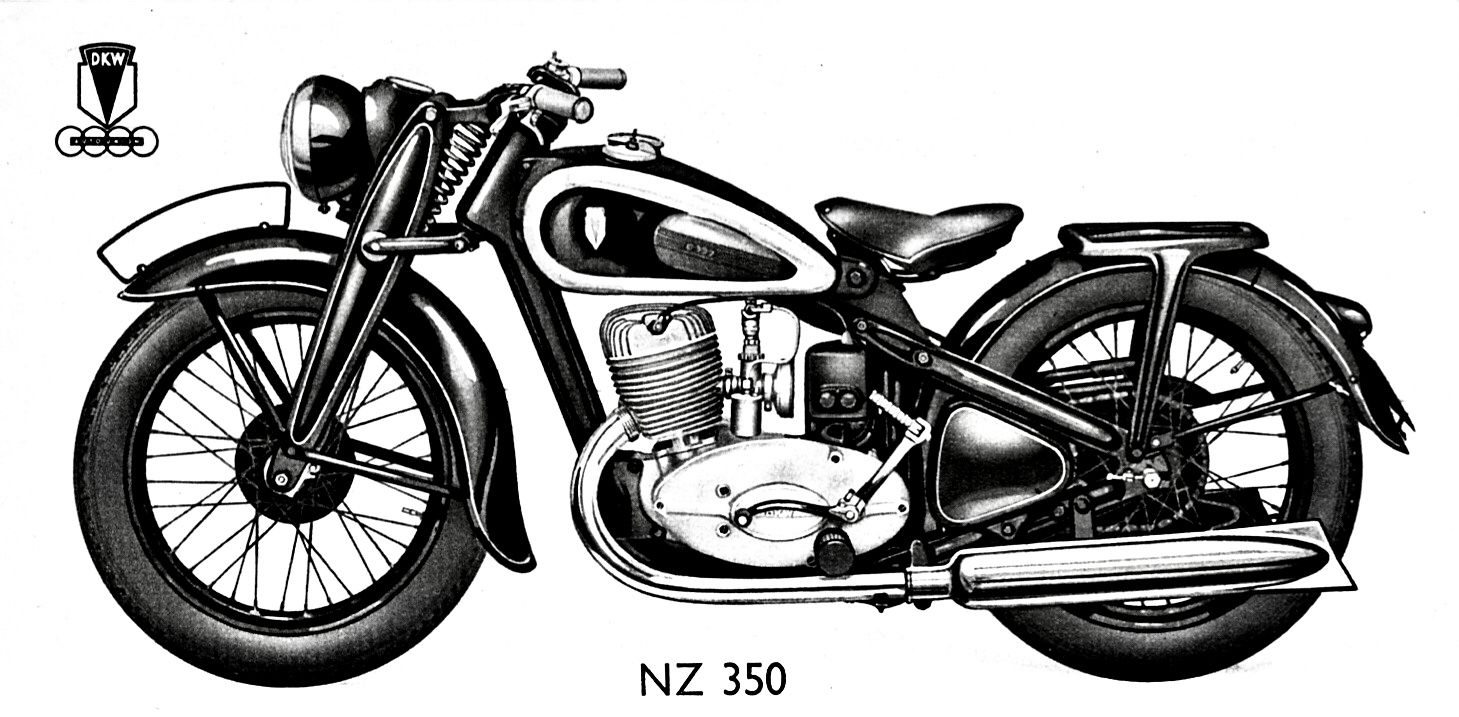
DKW NZ 350 (1938-1943)

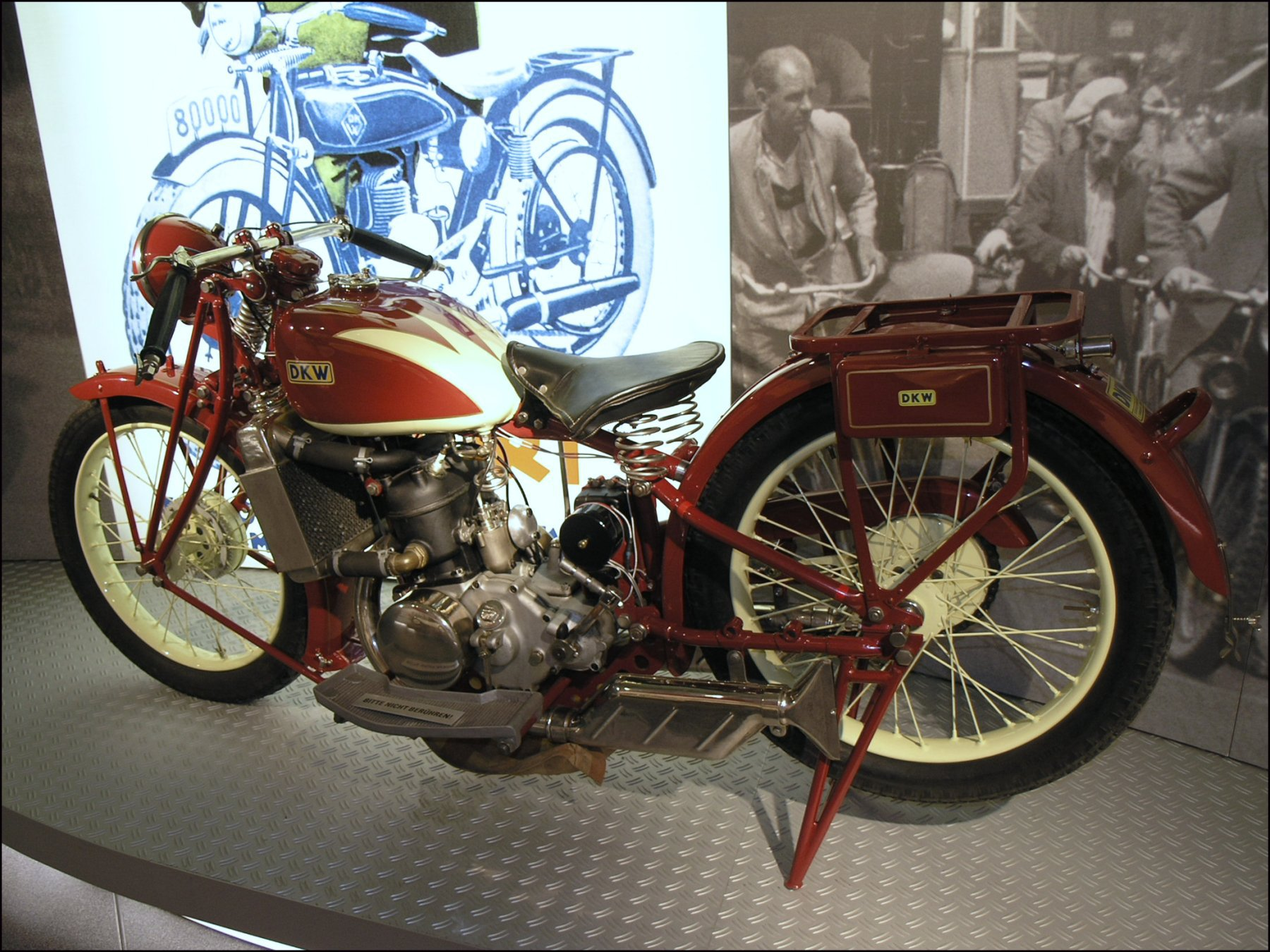
DKW Super Sport 500

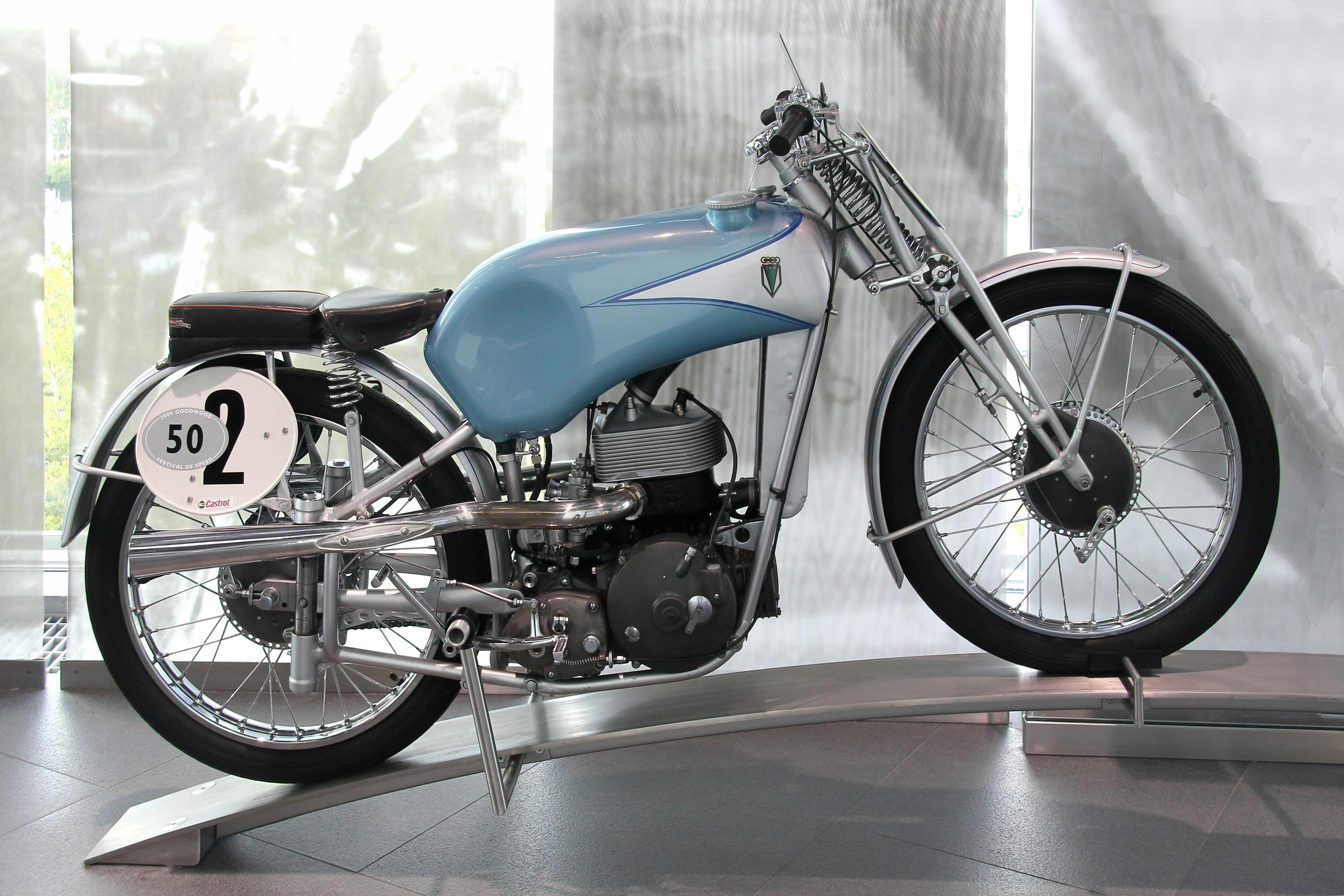
DKW SS 250 from 1938/39

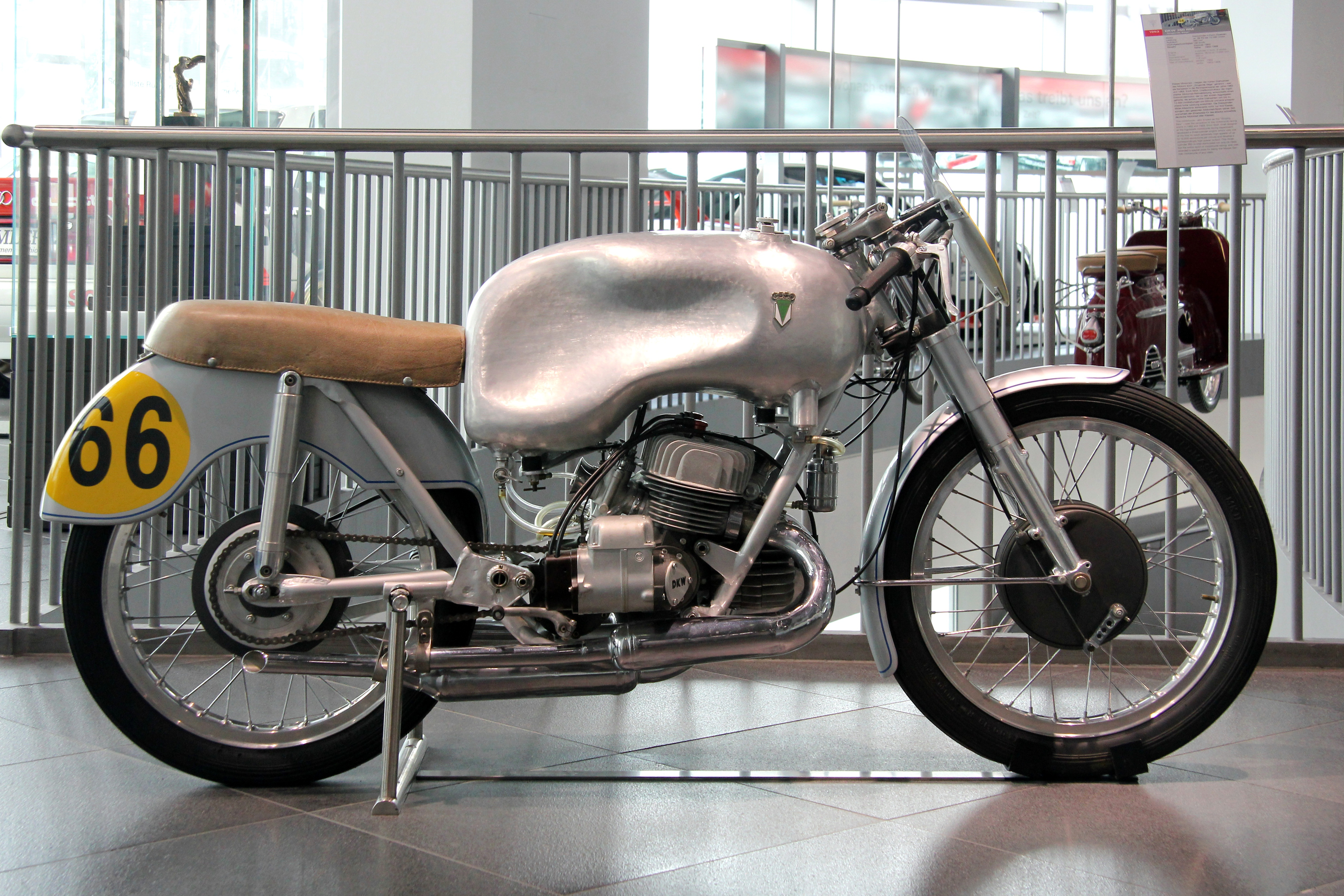
DKW RM 350 from 1953

- DKW Fahrradhilfsmotor M (1919-1923) 30,000 units
- DKW Golem (Sesselmotorrad) (1921-1922) 500 units
- DKW Lomos (Sesselmotorrad) (1922-1925) 2,500 units
- DKW Reichfahrtmodell RM (1922-1924) + RM25 (1925) 20,000 units
- DKW ZM (1924-1925) 7,200 units
- DKW SM (1924-1925) 1,000 units
- DKW E206 (1925-1928) 49,000 units
- DKW Transportrad (1925-1926) 1,100 units
- DKW Z 500 (1926-1928) 1,000 units incl. ZSW 500 (watercooled)
- DKW E 250 (1927-1928) 8,000 units
- DKW E 300 (1928-1929) ? units
- DKW E 200 (1928-1929) 19,200 units
- DKW ZSW 500 (1928-1929) (water-cooled) 1,000 units incl. Z 500 (aircooled)
- DKW Luxus 300 (1929-1930) 6,000 units
- DKW Super Sport 600 (1931-1932) ? units
- DKW Sport 350 (1933) 1,720 units
- DKW RT 100 (1934-1936) 10,000 units
- DKW RT 3 PS (1936-1940) 61,850 units
- DKW Sport 250 (1938) 7,800 units
- DKW SB 500 (1936-1939) 13,300 units
- DKW KS 200 (1936-1940) 58,600 units
- DKW NZ 250 (1938-1941) 26,700 units
- DKW NZ 350 (1938-1943) 45,300 units
- DKW NZ 500
- DKW ORE 250
- DKW RT 125 (1940-1941) 21,000 units
- RT 125-1 (1943-1944) 12,000 units
- RT 125 w (1949-1950) 25,000 units
- RT 125 w Telegabel (1950-1951) 30,600 units
- RT 125/2 (RT 125/2a) (1952-1954) 56,000 units
- RT 125/H (1954-1957) 22,350 units
- DKW RT 175
- DKW RT 200
- DKW RT 200H
- DKW RT 250/2
- DKW RT 250 H
- DKW RT 350 S
- DKW SB 200
- DKW SB 350
- DKW SS 350
- DKW SS 500 (water-cooled)
- DKW SS 600 (water-cooled)
- DKW ZS 500
- DKW Hercules (Wankel)
- DKW ARE 175
- DKW Hobby-Roller
- DKW Hummel (1956-1958)
- DKW KM 200
- DKW URe 175
- DKW 502 (1968-1969) 3,045 units
- DKW 502 Extra (1968-1969) 874 units
- DKW 503 (1968-1969) 612 units
- DKW 504 (1970-1972) ? units
- DKW 505 (1970-1972) ? units
- DKW Sportmofa (197?-1979)

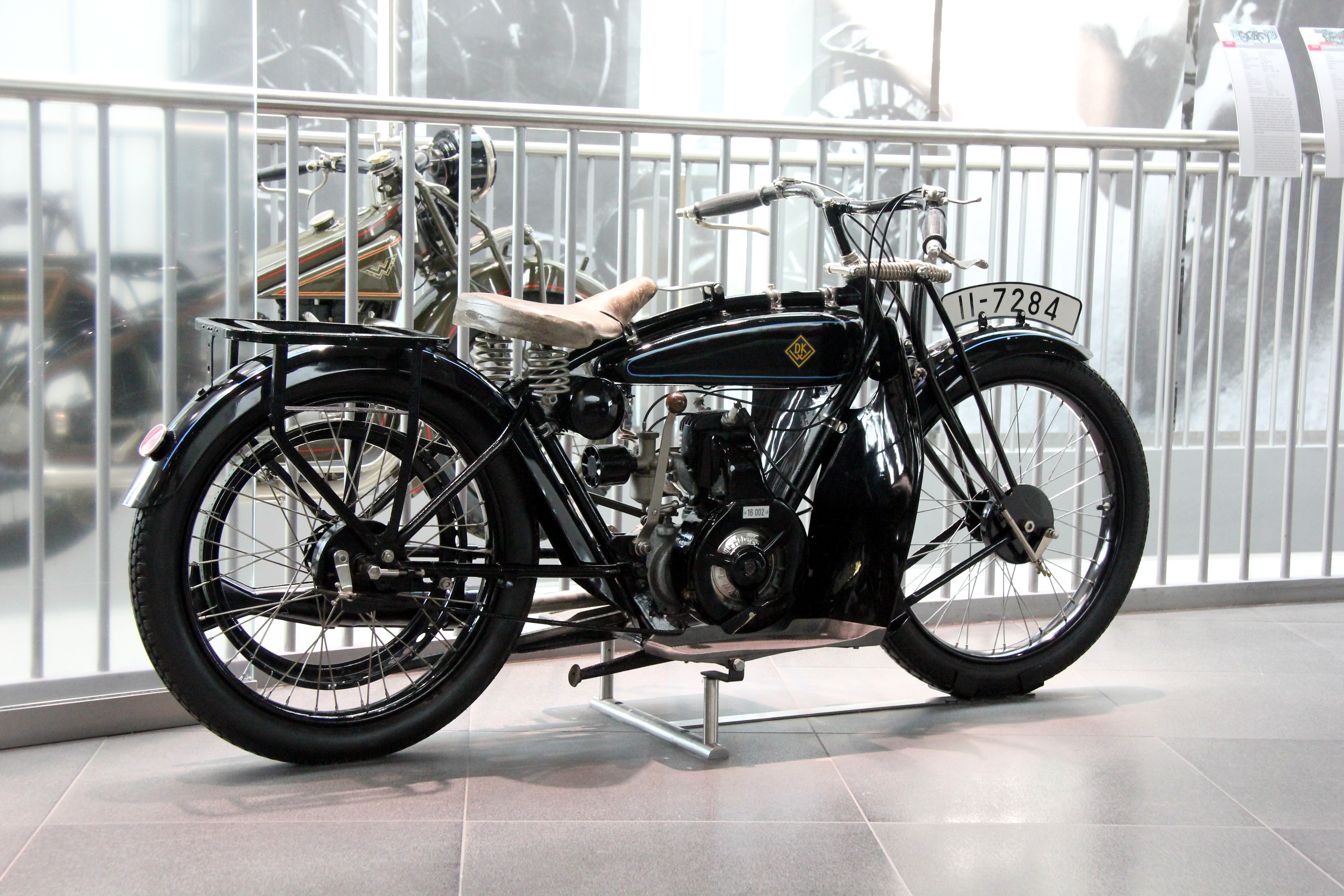
DKW E 206, 1927

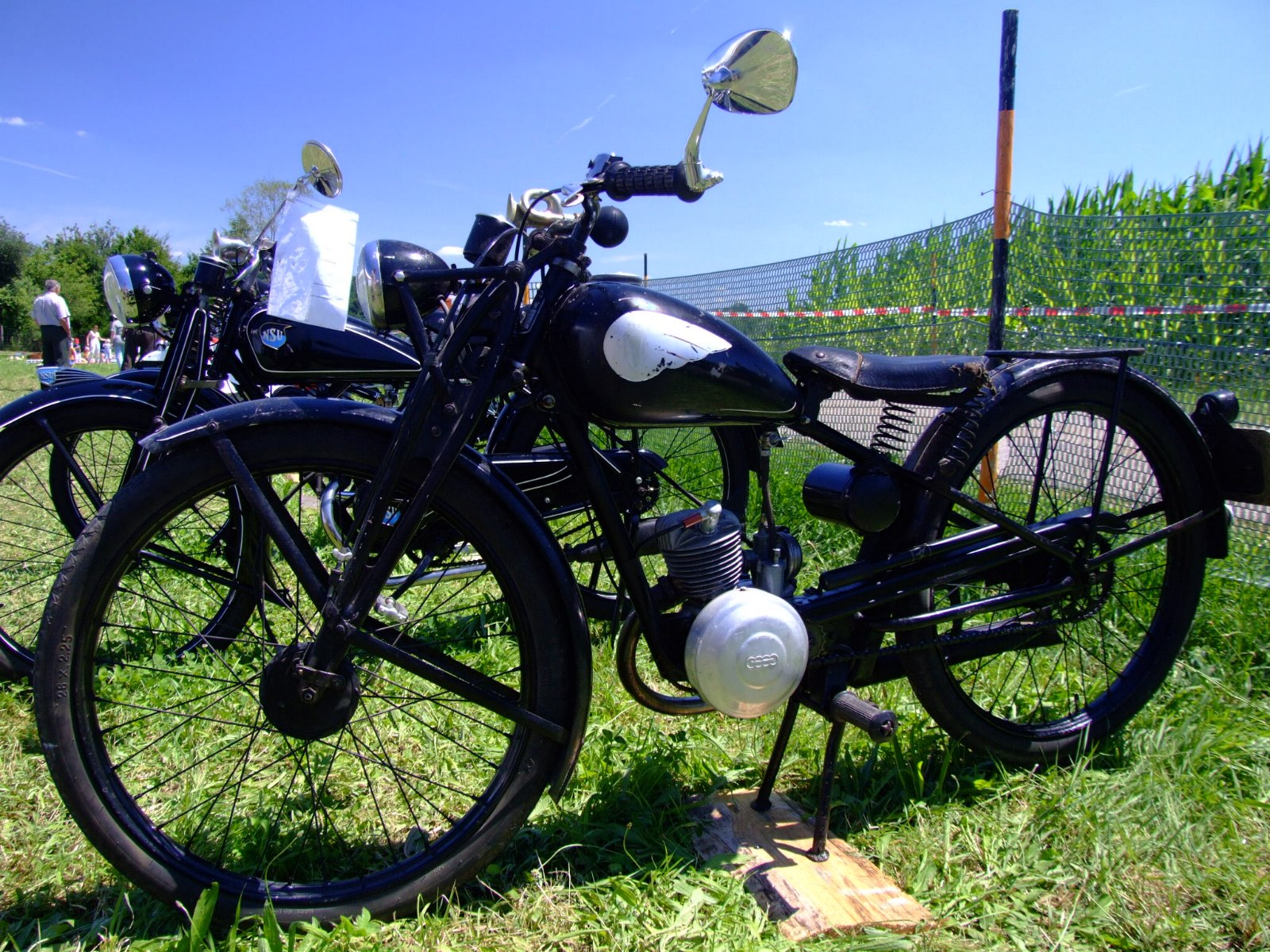
DKW RT 3 PS (1939)

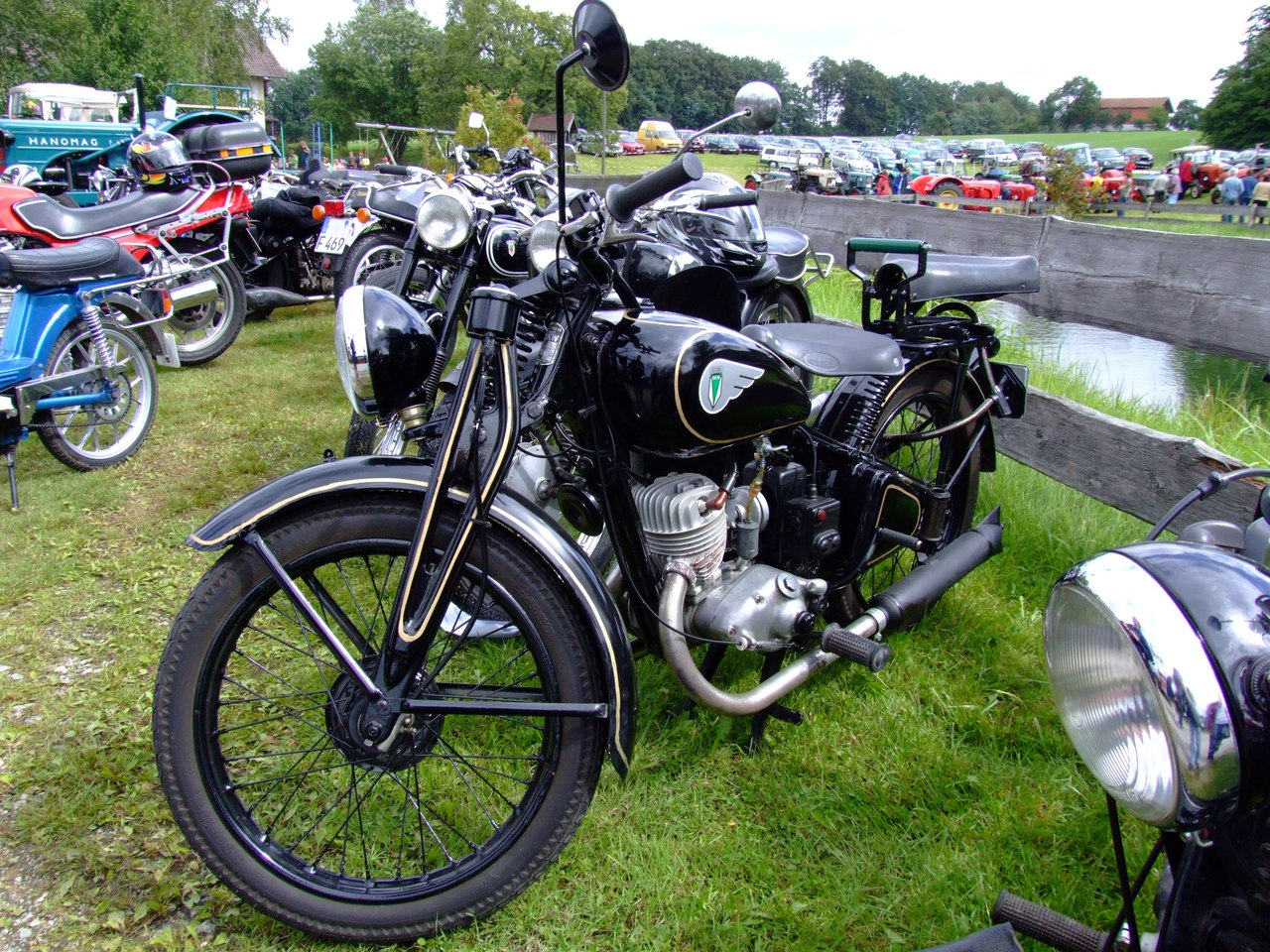
DKW (1940)

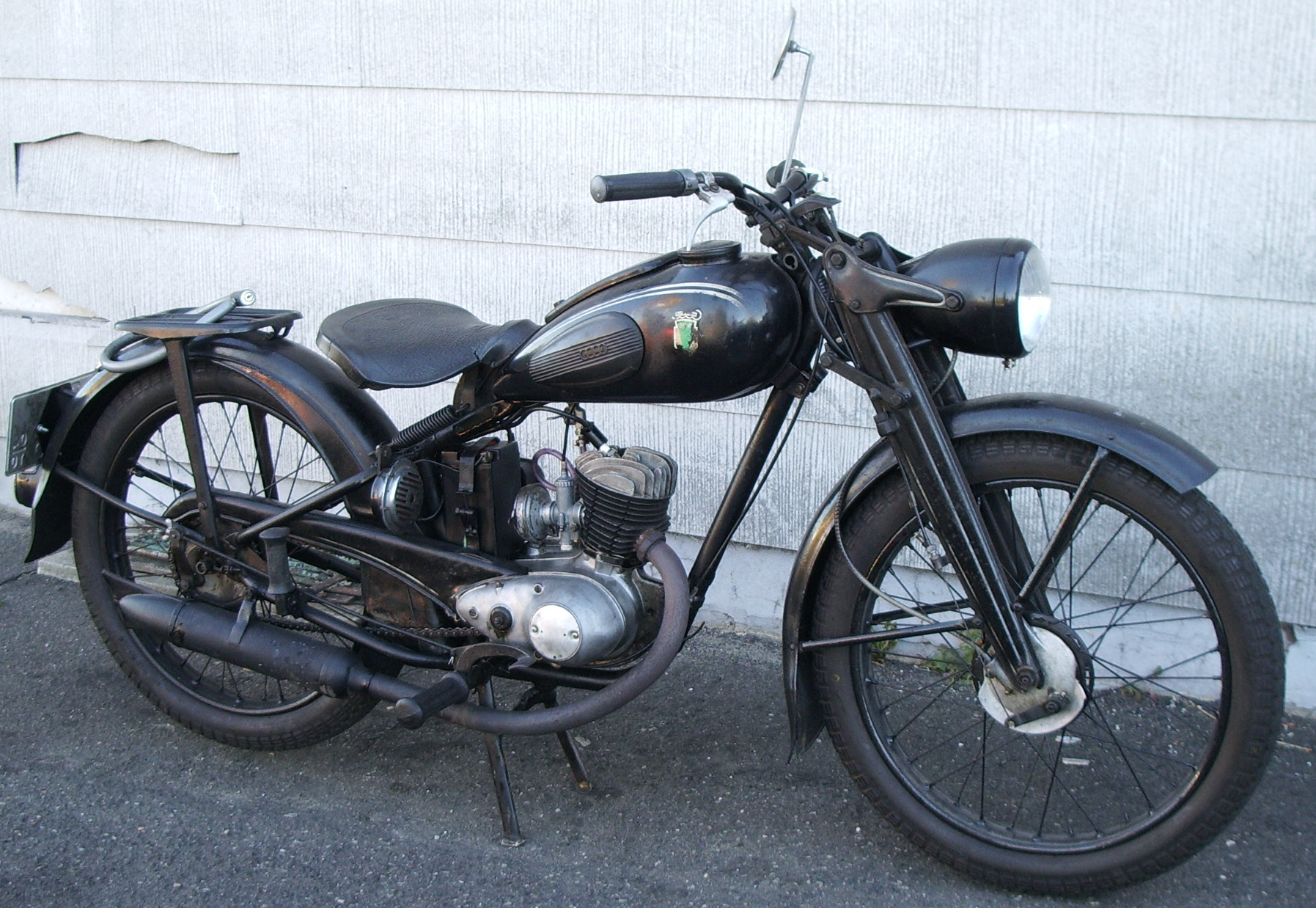
DKW RT 125 W (1950)

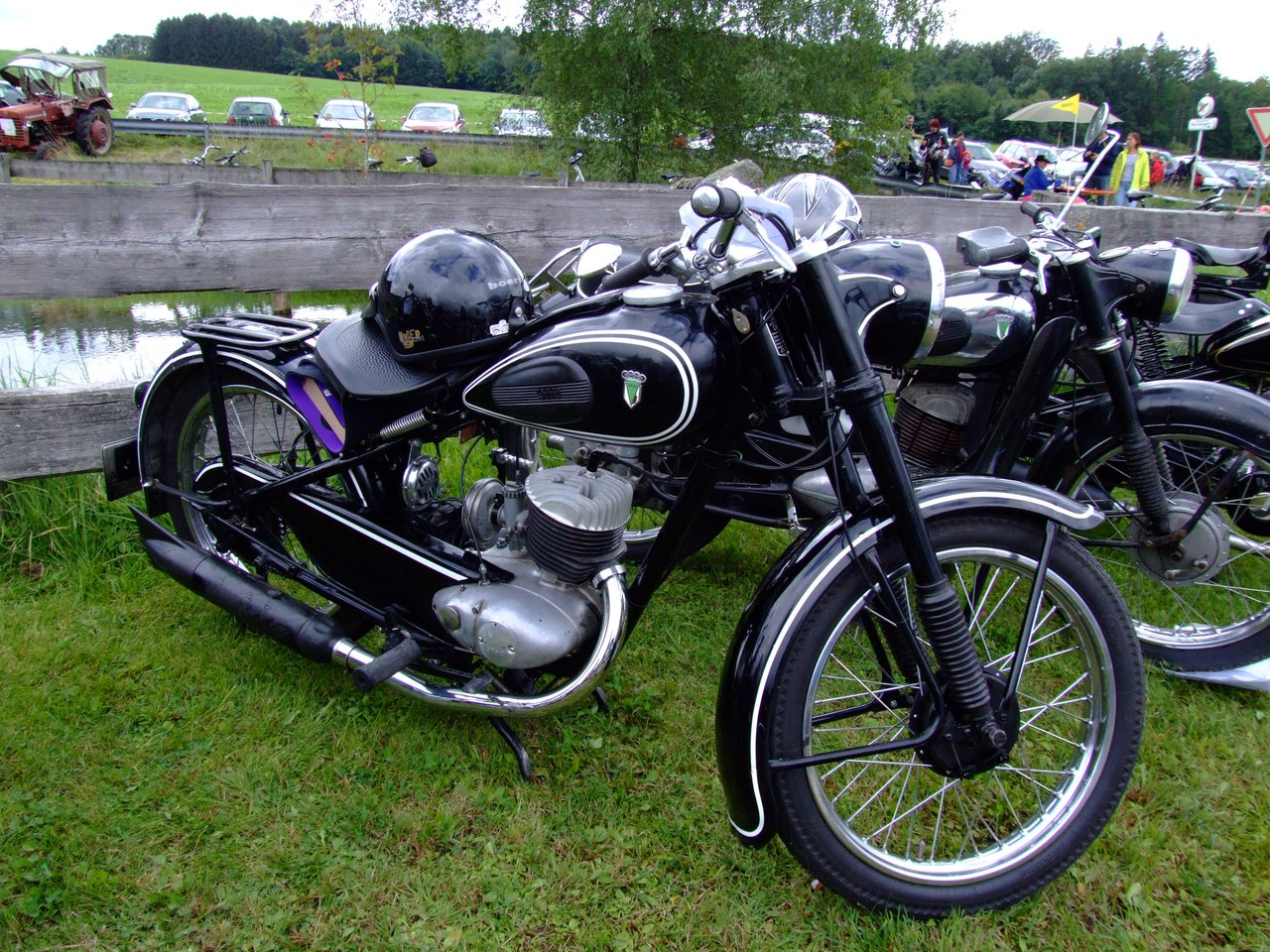
DKW RT 200 (1952)

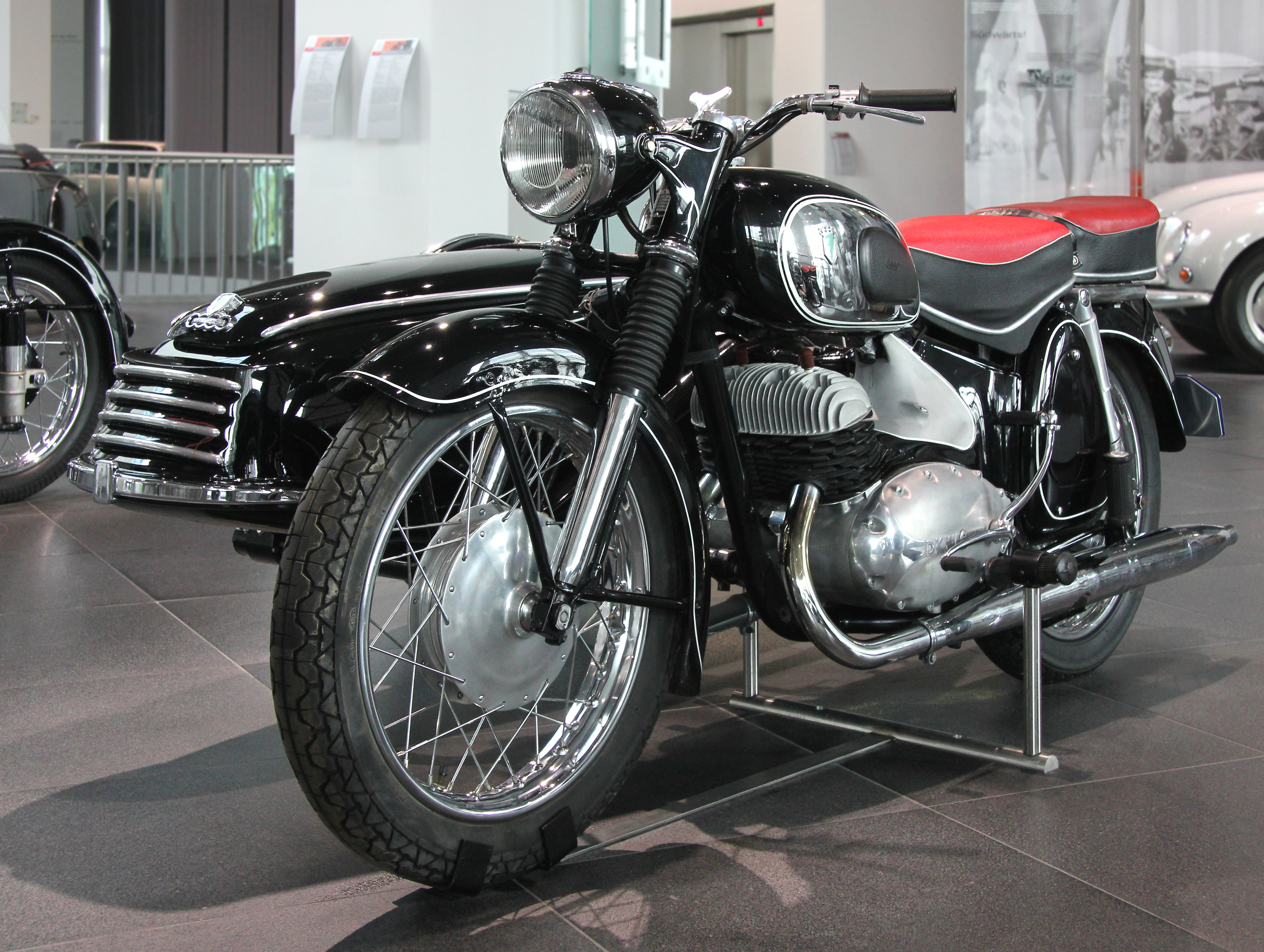
RT 350 S, 1956

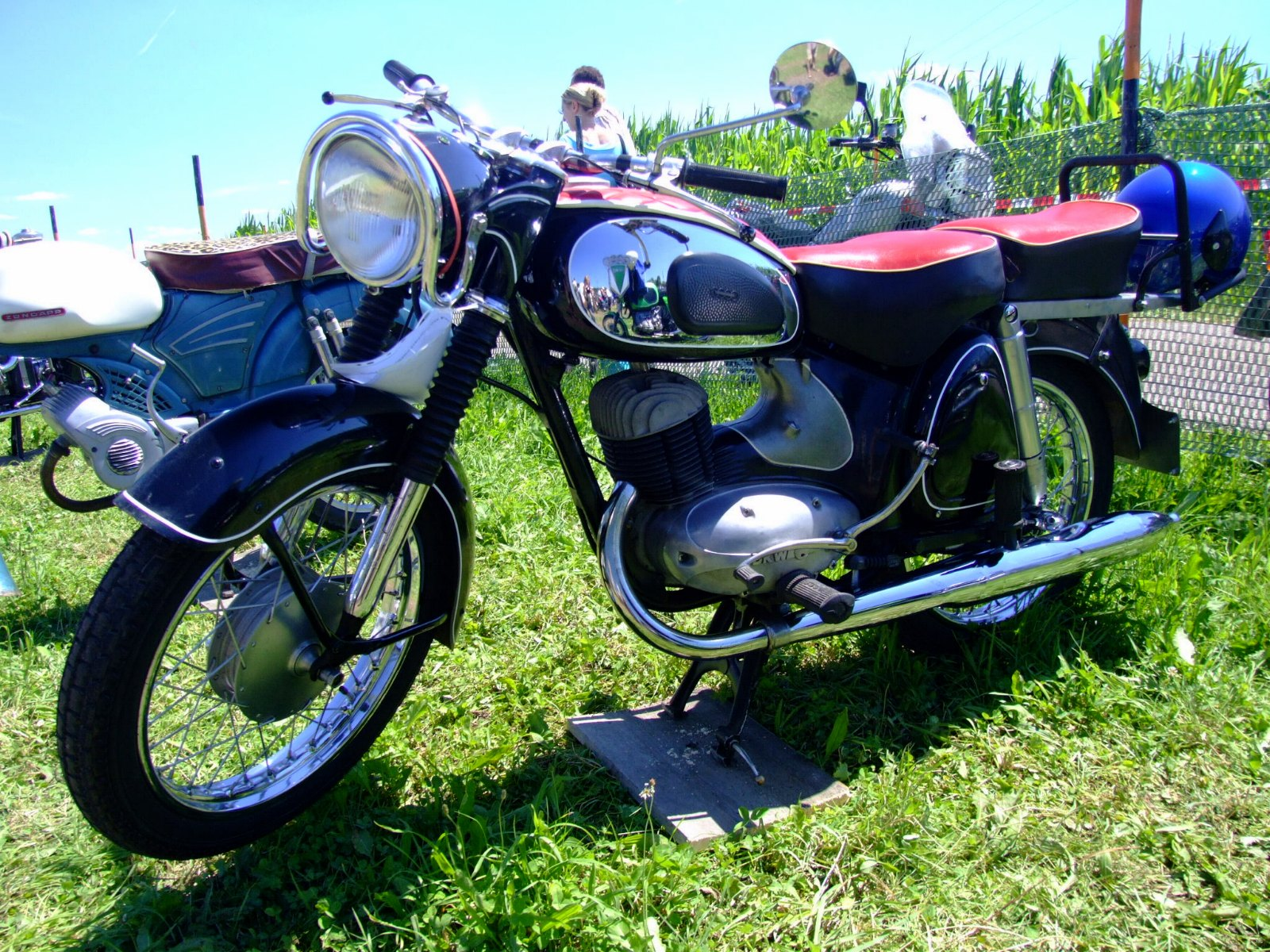
DKW RT 175 S (1955)

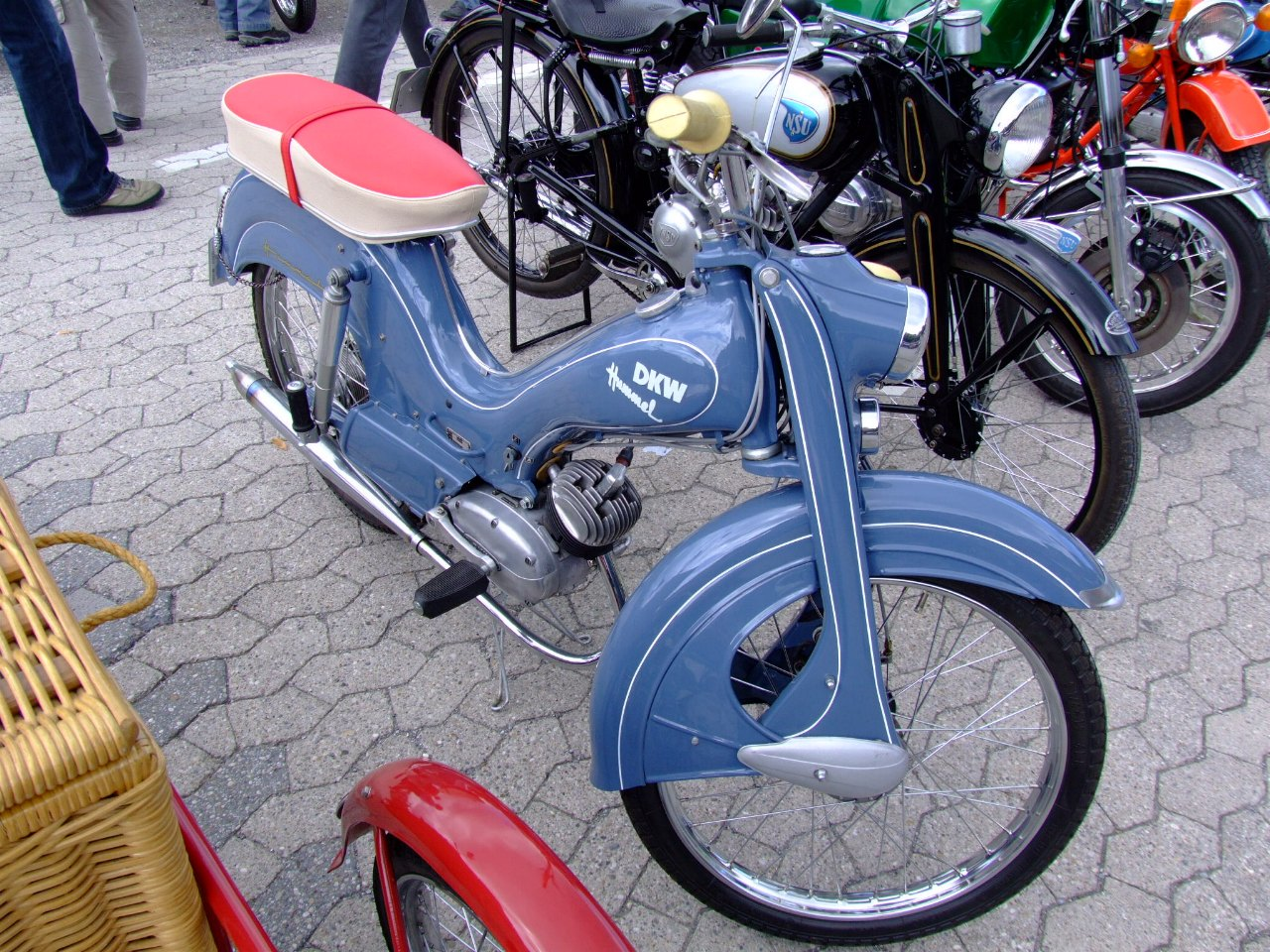
DKW Hummel

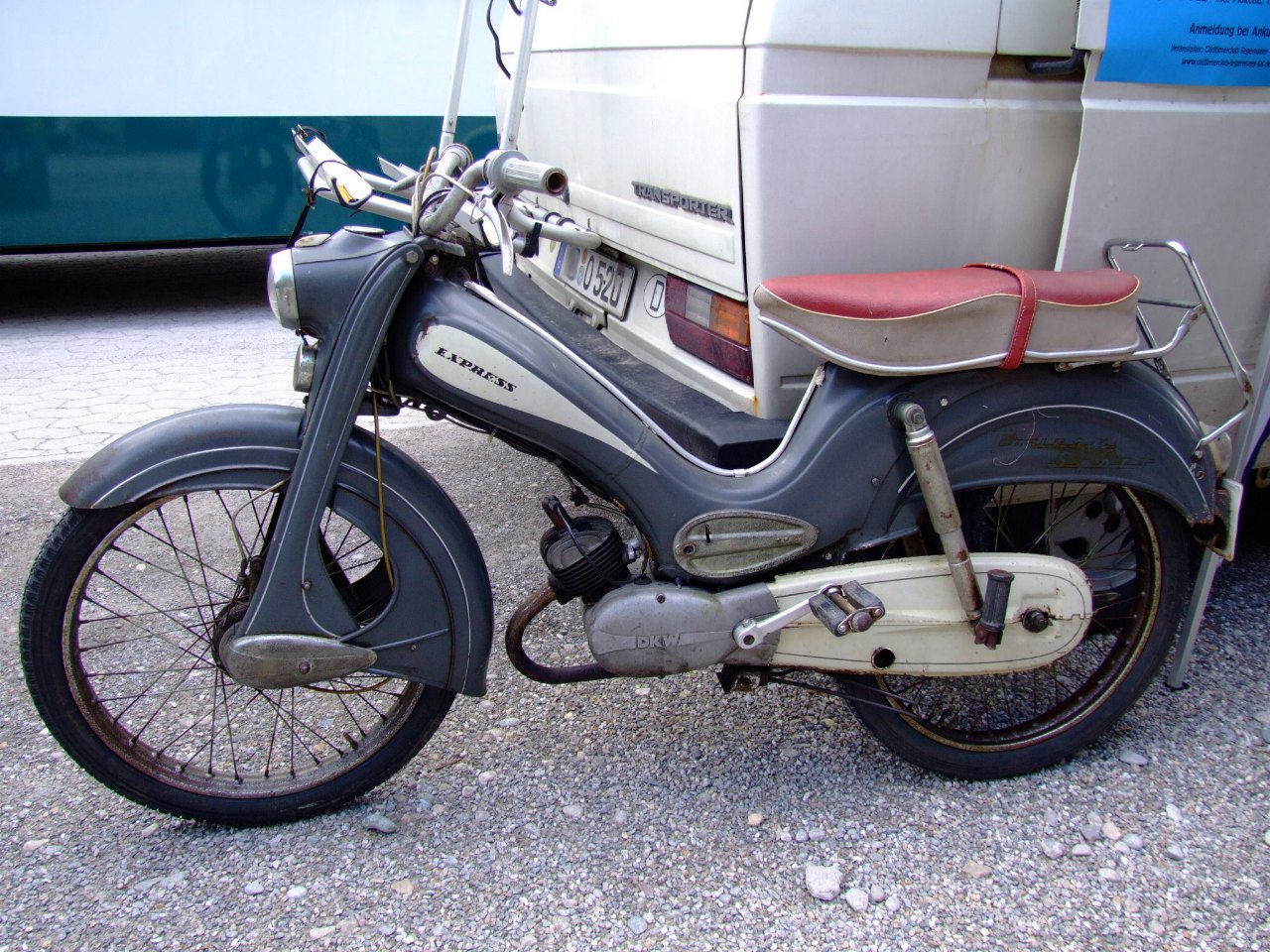
Express T. Sport (DKW-Motor)

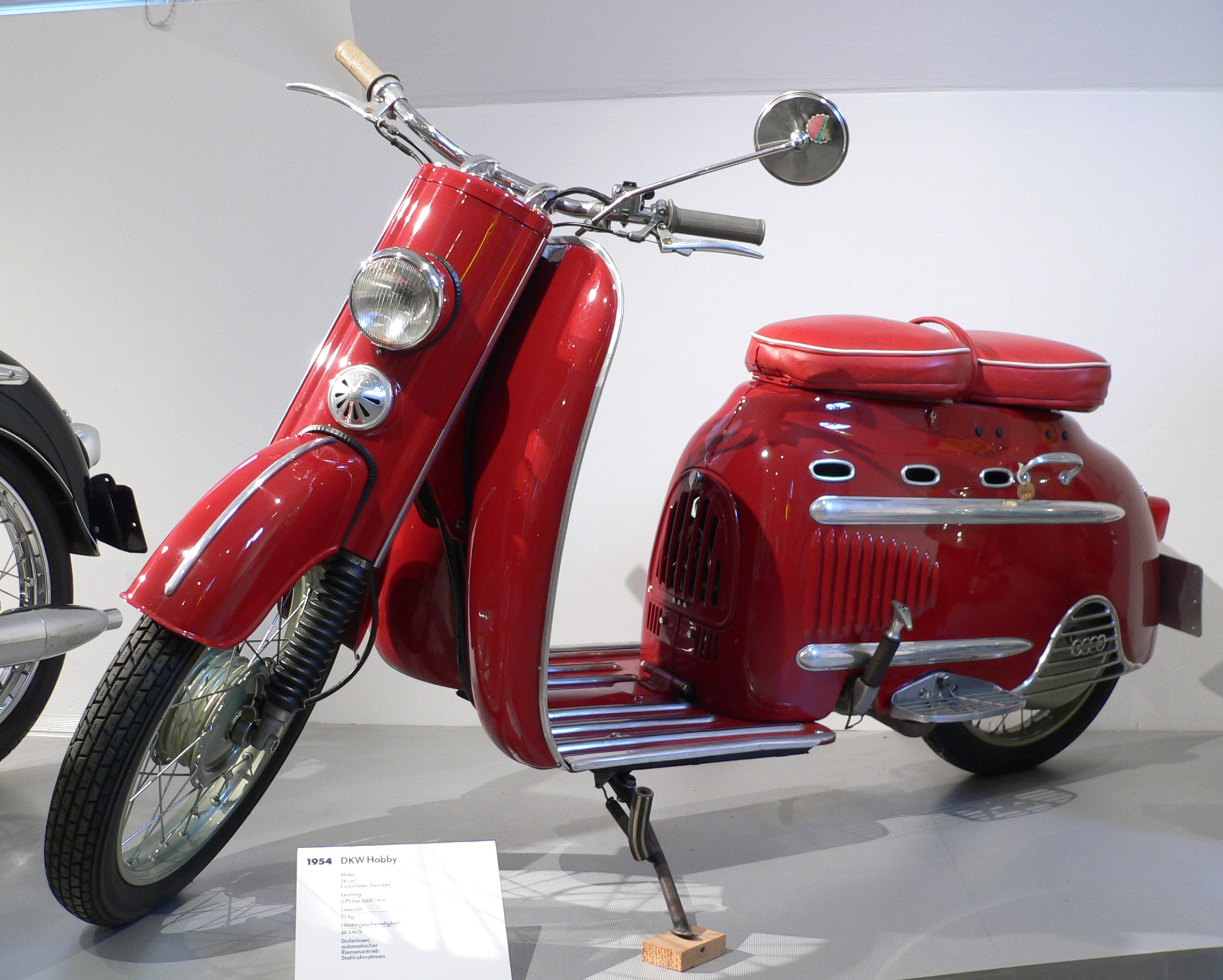
DKW Motorroller Hobby of 1954 in the Deutsches Zweirad- und NSU-Museum

== Companies that used DKW engines ==
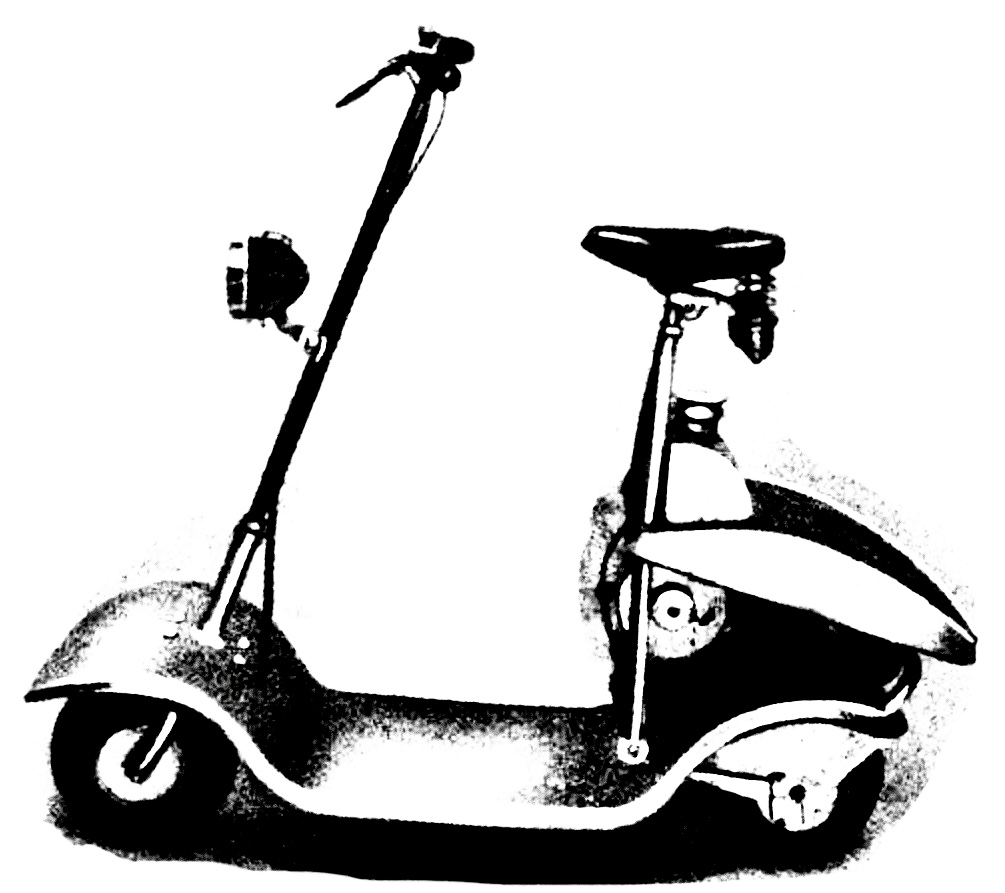
W.A.D. 78 cc (1936)

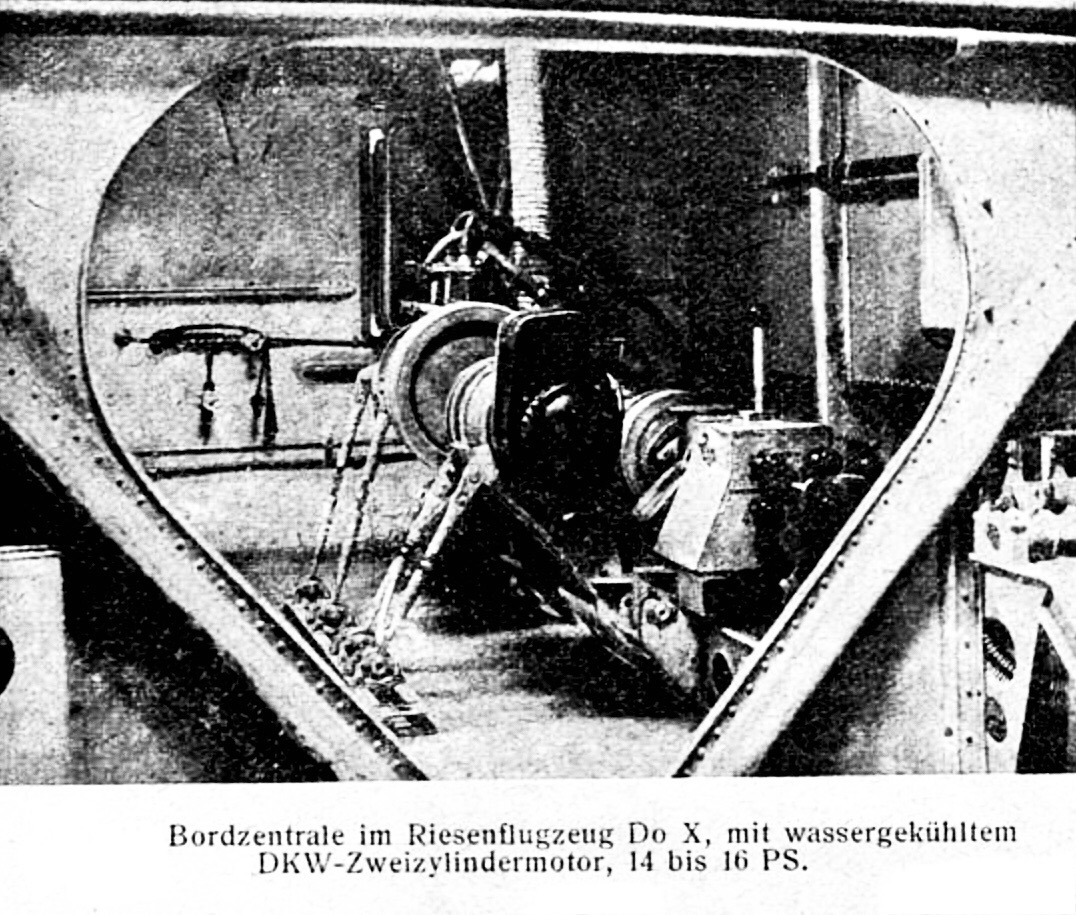
DKW power supply of the DO X; also for the start of the main engines

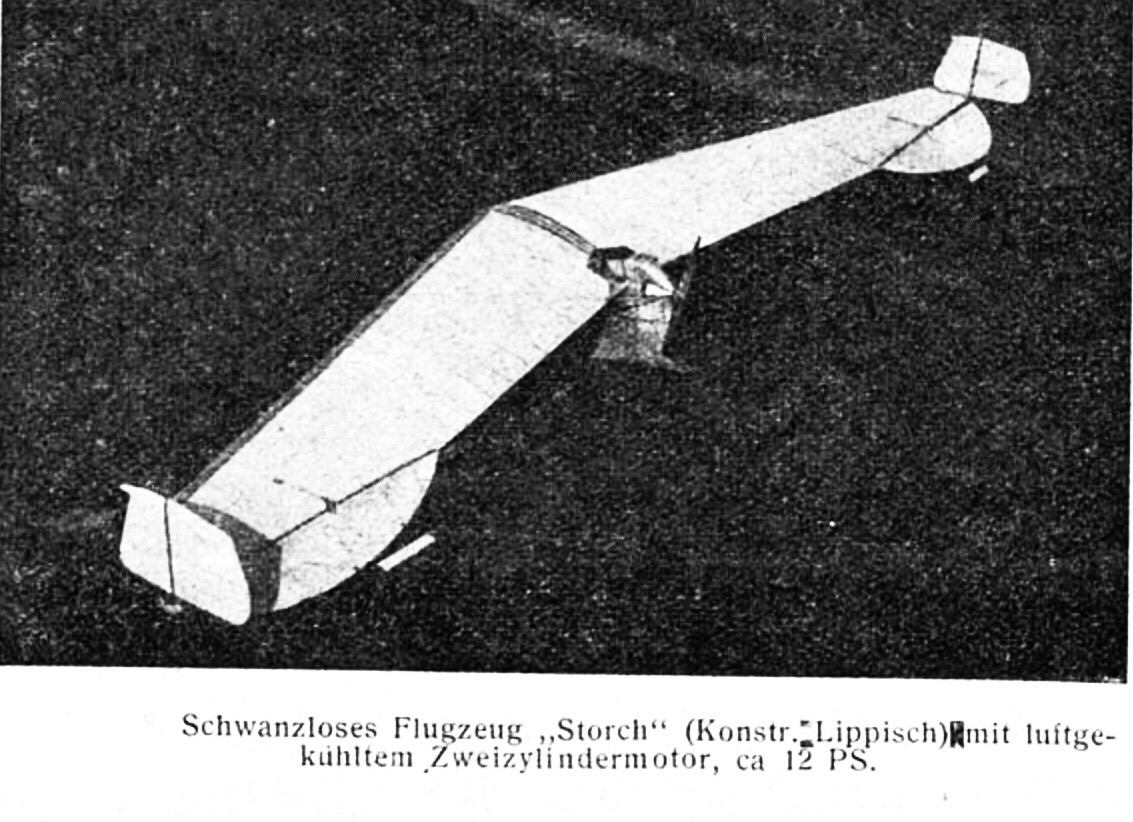
Lippisch Storch V with DKW 500 cc

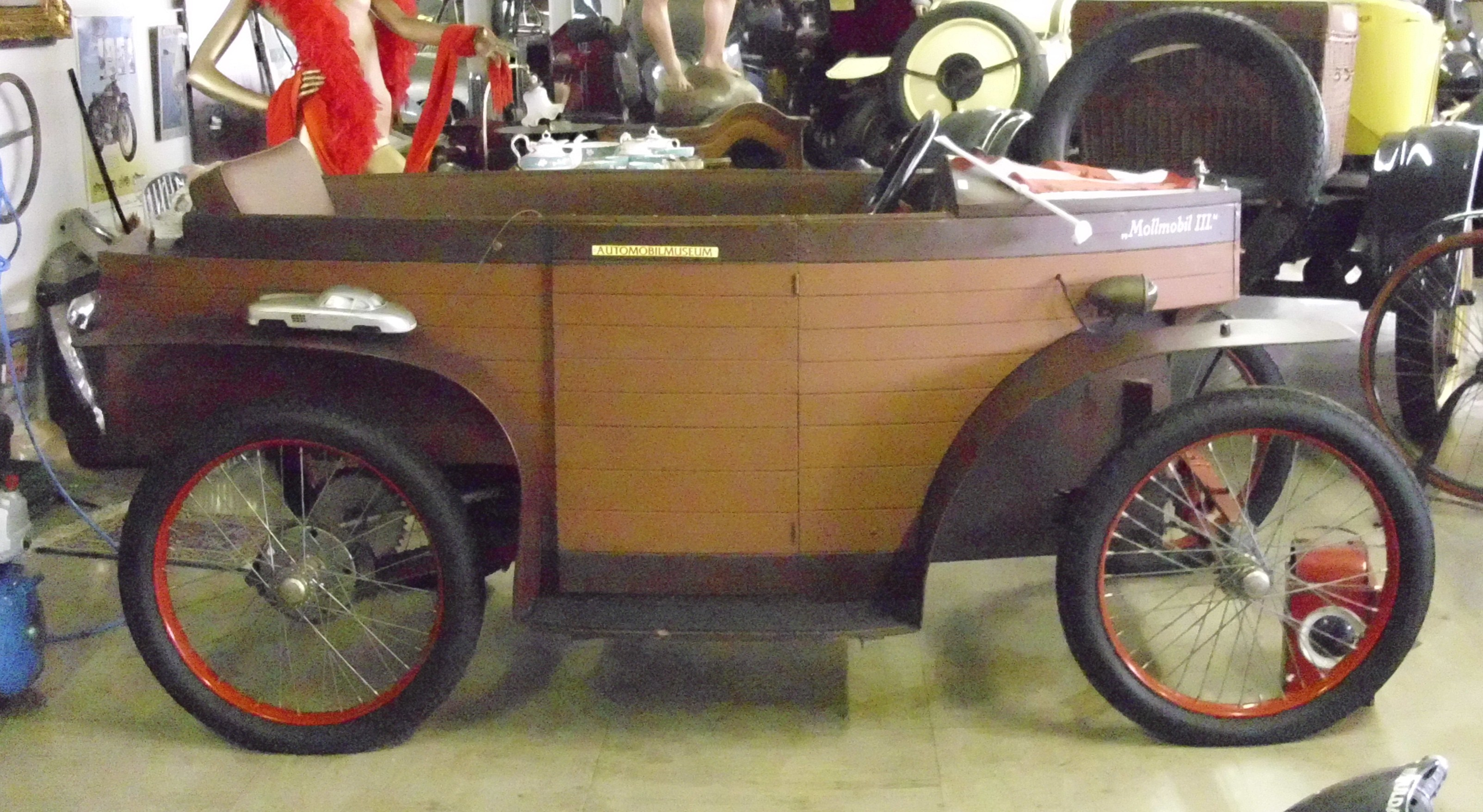
Mollmobil DKW 200 cc
- W.A.D (Wolf A. Doerhoeffer)
- Framo
- Dornier Do X
- RRG Storch V
- E. C. Flader Feuerlöschgerätefabrik
- Erla 5
- Moll-Werke
- Blitzkarren
- Autobau-Genossenschaft CH
- IFA F9
- Baur DKW F-10
- Dobro-Motorist

== Refrigerators from DKW ==
In 1927, the company founder J.S. Rasmussen acquired a license for the production of scroll compressors and refrigerators based on the design of the American manufacturer Norge. In 1928, three workers were engaged in the production of refrigerators. In 1929, the DKW refrigeration was presented at the Leipzig fair and was so successful that by 1930, thirty workers were employed in the production of refrigerators. In 1931, the company was renamed in DKK (Deutsche Kühl und Kraftmaschinengesellschaft m.b.H. = German Refrigeration and Power Machinery Company Ltd.). In 1938, DKK had 1200 employees.

== DKW replicas, copies, and licensed replicas ==
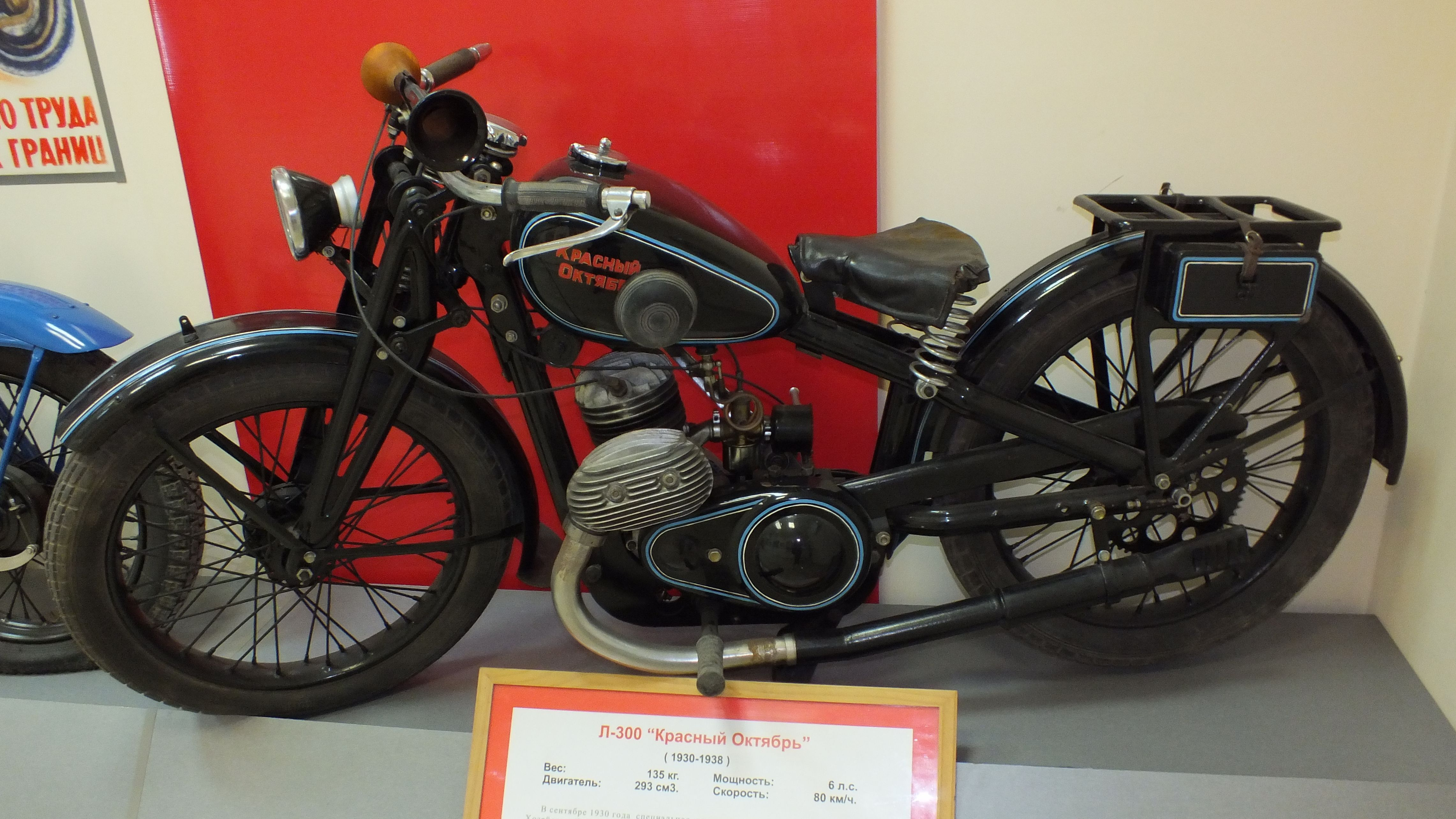
Л-300 from Promet or Red October

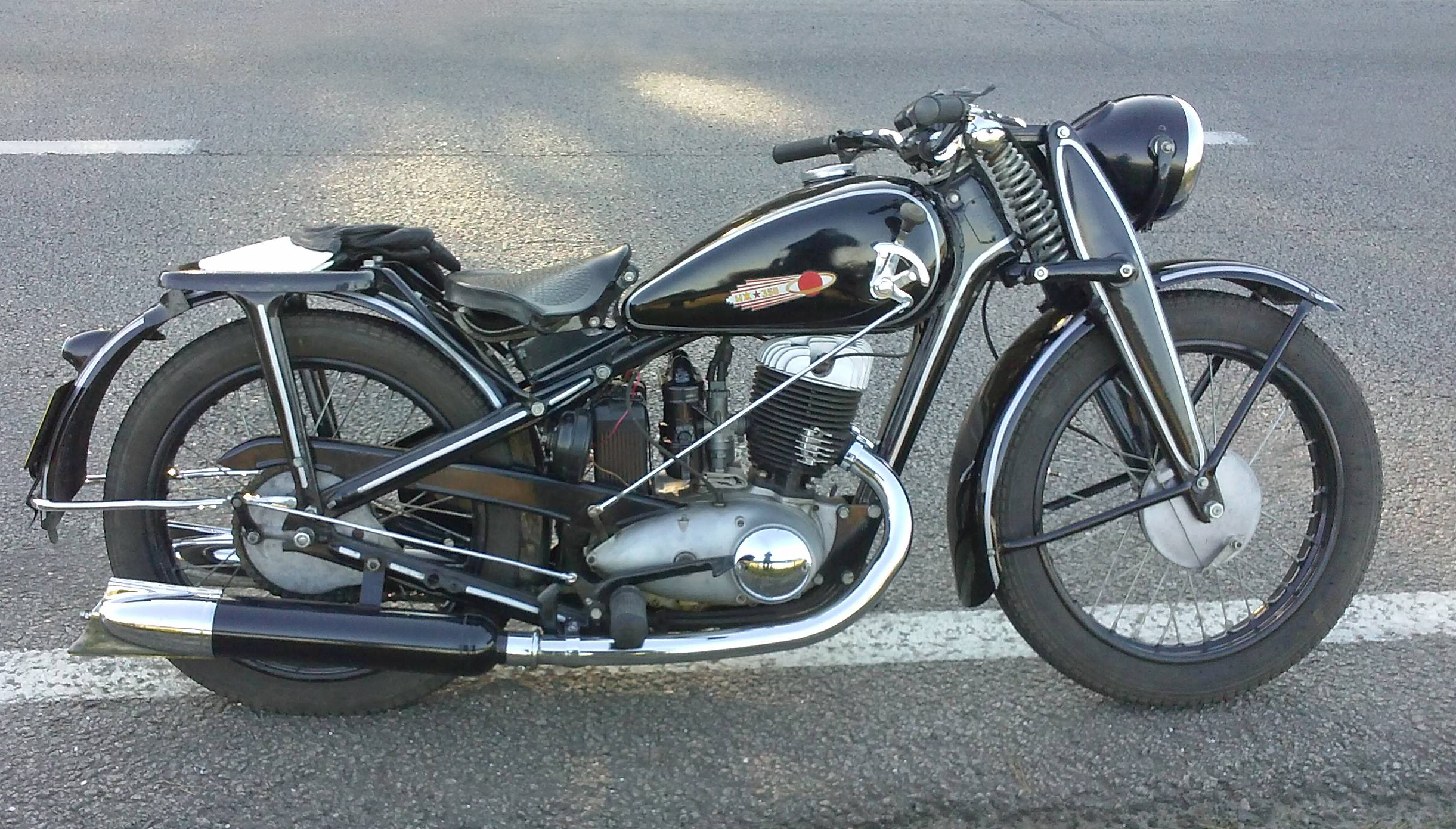
ISCH-350 from Ischmasch

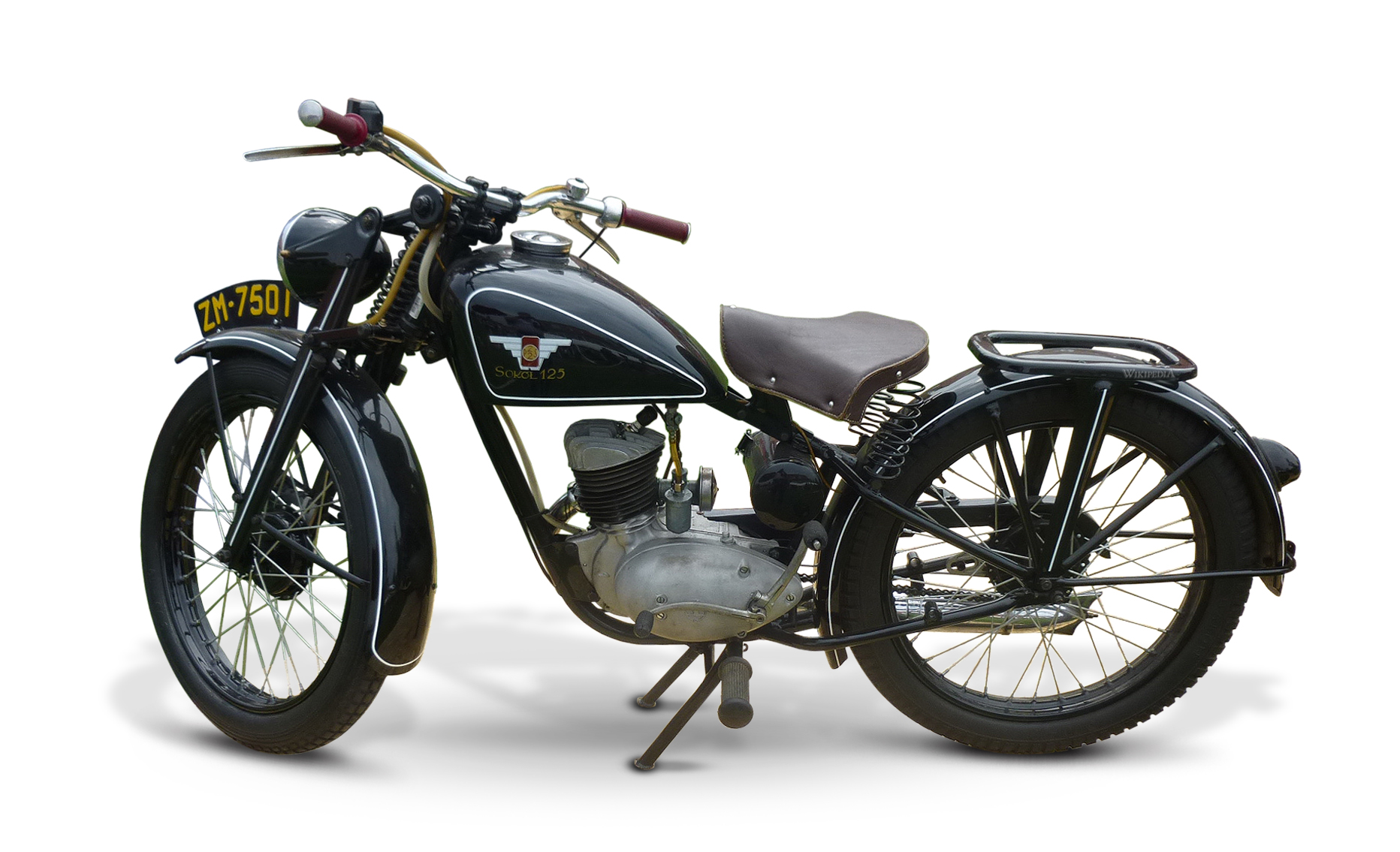
Sokół 125 from Państwowe Zakłady Samochodowe no. 2

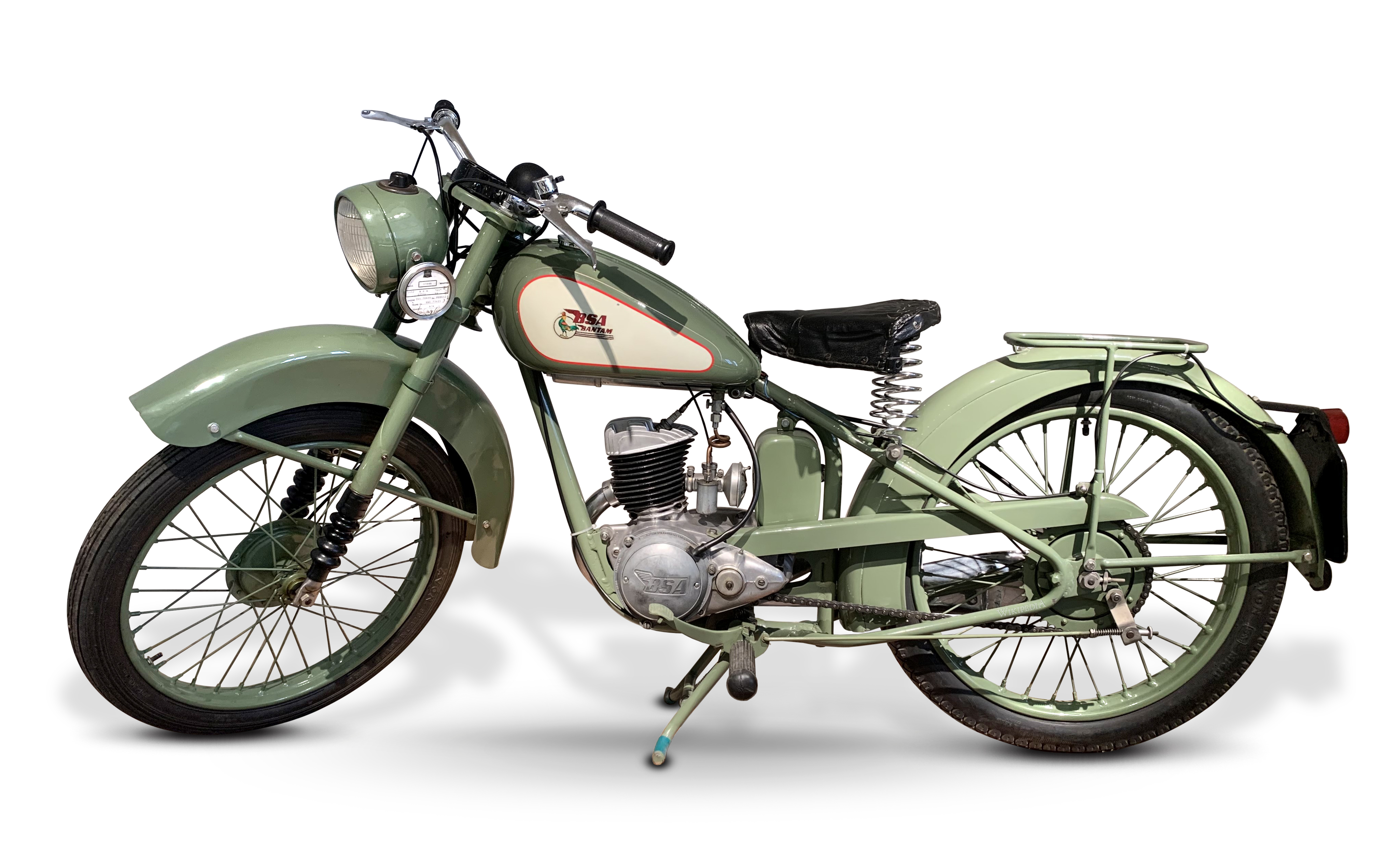
BSA Bantam D1 from Birmingham Small Arms Company (BSA)

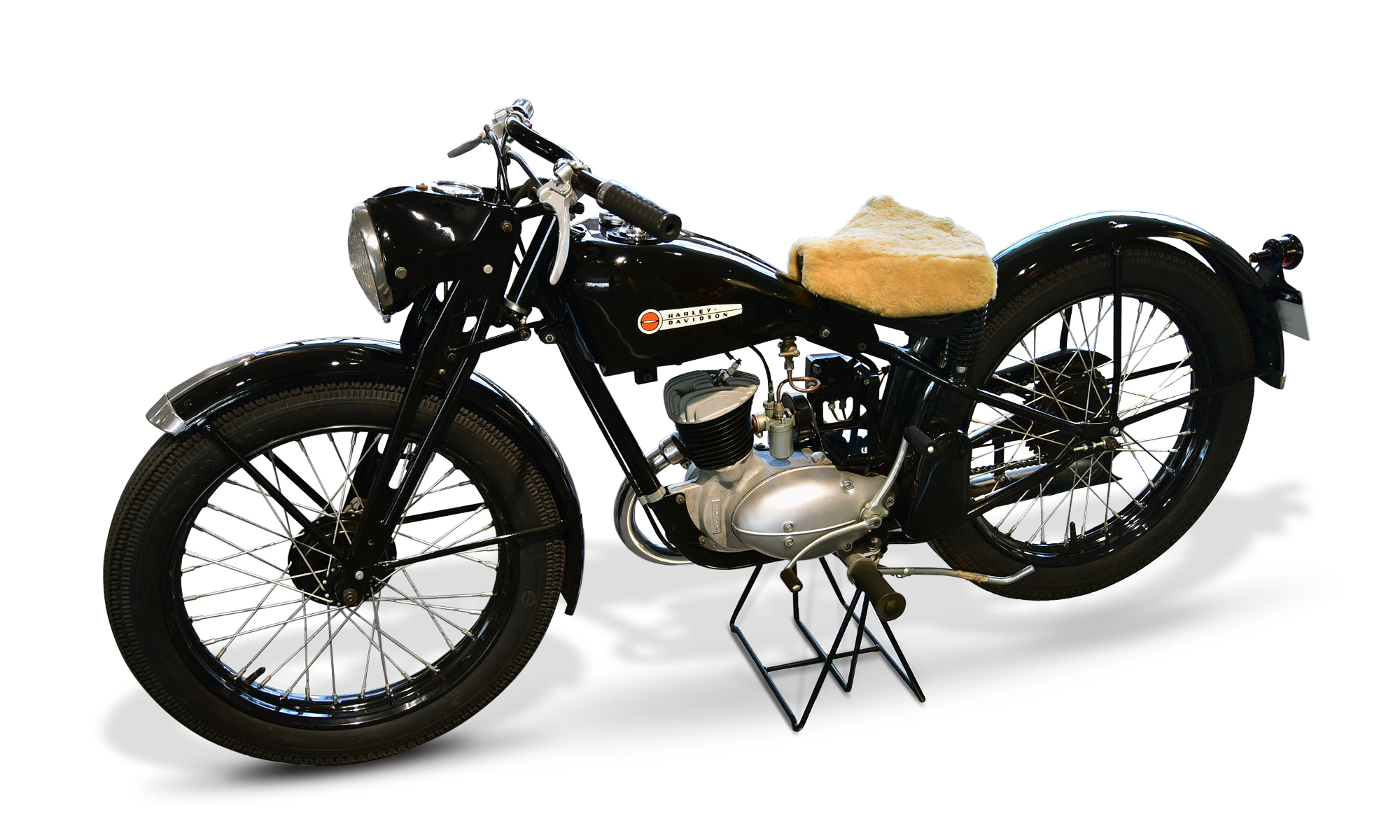
Harley Davidson 125

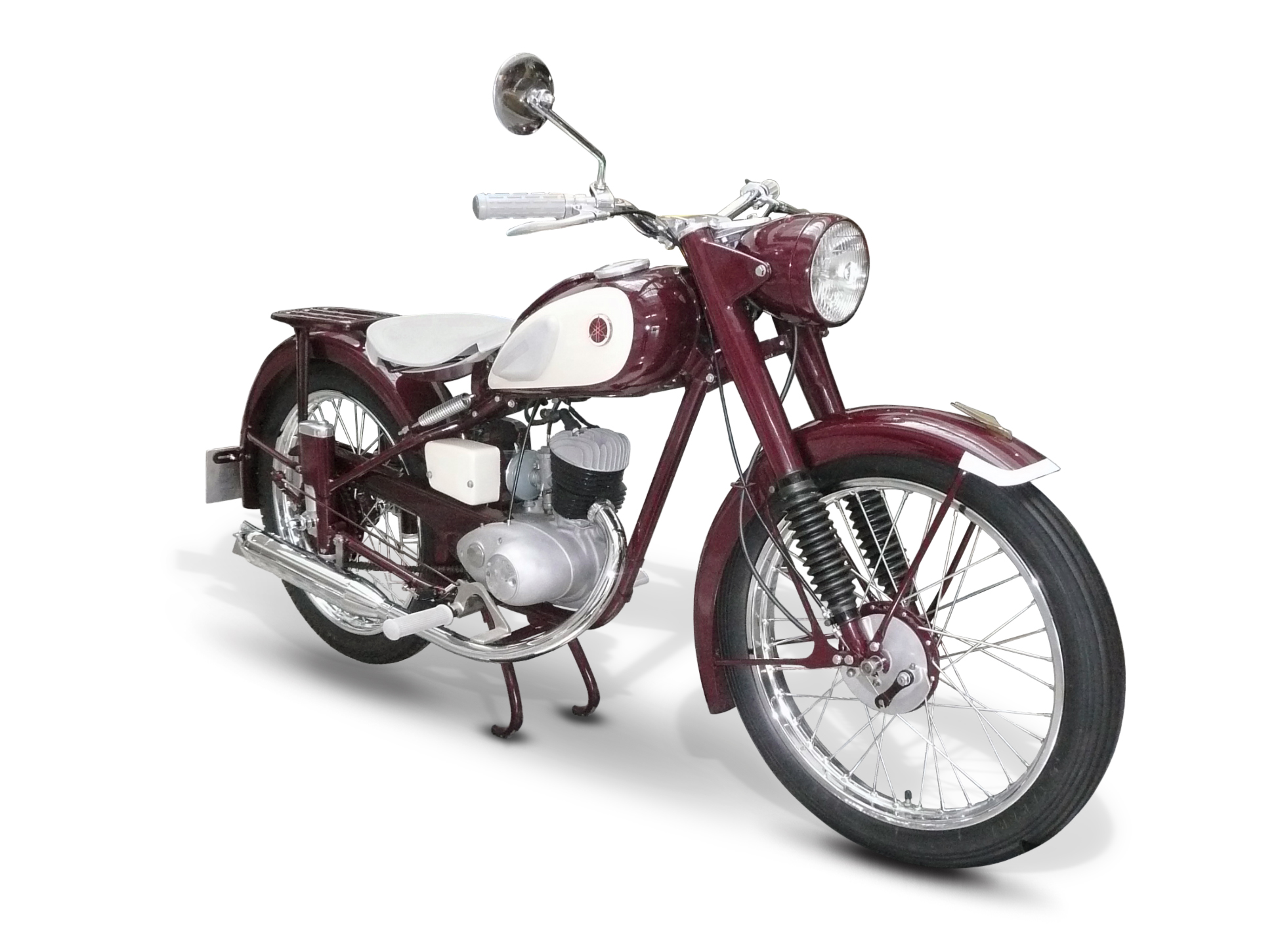
Yamaha YA-1
- L-300 (Л-300) from Promet (1930–1934)
- L-300 (Л-300) from Red October (1933–1939)
- ISCH-350 (ИЖ-350) from Ischmasch (1946-1951)
- Sokół 125 from Państwowe Zakłady Samochodowe no. 2 (PZS) (1948-1950)
- BSA Bantam D1 from Birmingham Small Arms Company (BSA) (1948-1963)
- Harley-Davidson Hummer S-125 (1947-1952); Model 165 (1953–1959); Hummer (1955–1959); Super 10 (1960–1961); Ranger (1962); Pacer (1962–1965); Scat (1962–1965); Bobcat (1966)
- Yamaha YA-1 (1955-1958)
- Motauto „Lusso“; „Sport“; „Monza“ (1955-1959)

== DKW engines and stationary engines, boat engines, aircraft engines, agricultural engines ==
The engine division of DKW is underestimated in terms of its importance to the company. In the autumn of 1921, the 10,000th DKW engine was produced. In February 1924, the next anniversary was reached with the 50,000th engine.

== See also ==
- Eucort
- List of automobile manufacturers of Germany
