= DKW F10 =

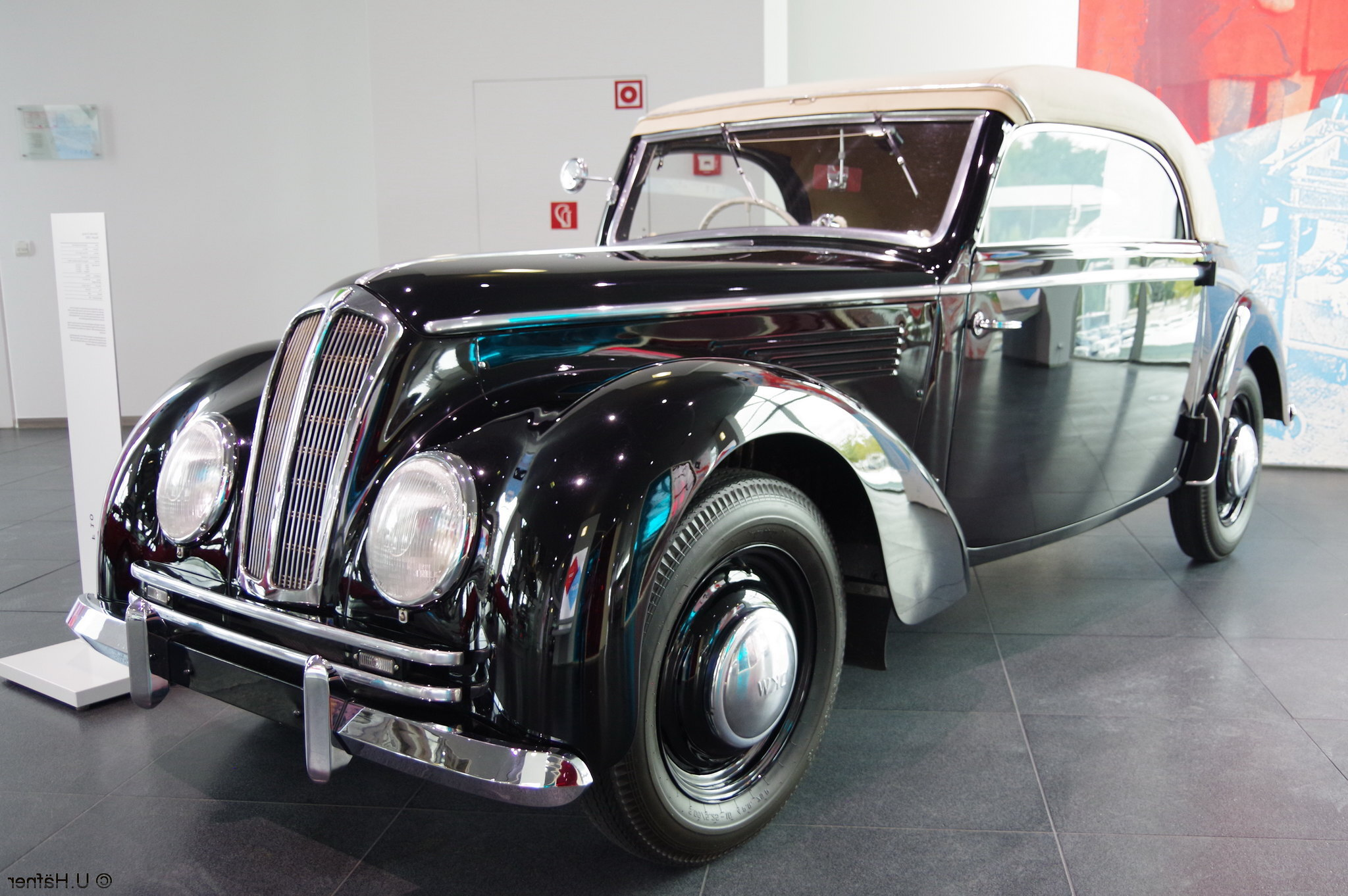

Overview
- Manufacturer: DKW (Auto Union)
- Production: 1949–1950; 180 produced
- Assembly: Germany: Ingolstadt

Body and chassis
- Class: Small family car (C)
- Body style: 2-door saloon; 2-door cabriolet
- Layout: FF layout

Powertrain
- Engine: 688 cc two stroke I2
- Transmission: 3-speed manual

Chronology
- Predecessor: DKW F8
- Successor: DKW F89

The DKW F10 was a car sold by DKW of Ingolstadt, West Germany, during 1949 and the early part of 1950 only. It was the first postwar car produced by the firm, though they initially utilized leftover or damaged pre-war stock of F8 chassis, powered by existing stock of 688 cc, two-stroke two-cylinder F8 engines (around 180 such examples were produced). The F8 had originally been built between 1939 and 1942.

== Design ==
After the war, DKW's body factory in Spandau was behind the Iron Curtain, having becoming part of IFA, which meant that the West German company was forced to outsource the bodywork for the early post-war years. The Baur coachbuilding firm of Stuttgart had been supplying convertible bodies for the pre-war F5, F7, and F8 between 1936 and 1941. Karosserie Baur was thus selected to manufacture a new design, more modern than the original, wood-framed F8 models. The bodies, however were also considerably more expensive than the original design, partly because of their hand-built nature. Only two-door bodystyles were available: a limousine (saloon, often called a coupé by later commenters) or a cabriolet (convertible).

== Production ==
Starting in December 1949, DKW began production of their new Schnellaster which meant availability of new parts. This allowed them to use brand new engines mounted in new-built, updated chassis, which were then delivered to Baur. The new chassis incorporated post-war advancements such as hydraulic brakes and telescopic shock absorbers. A total of 22 new-build F10 chassis were produced at the very end of 1949, with 174 being completed during the first half of 1950. Serial numbers ranged from F 10 10002 to F 10 10197, which means a total of 196 fully new cars were built. When production of the F89 began in Ingolstadt, in August 1950, the F10 was taken out of production. Very few F10 cars were sold in Germany; most were exported.

The Baur coachbuilding firm had presented its new F10 body as early as 1948 on a used prewar DKW F8 chassis, and from late-1948 to 1952, 1,110 of these new bodies were mounted on actual prewar F8 chassis whose wood-framed bodies had deteriorated, thus essentially turning them into new cars, and giving them a new lease on life.

== In East Germany ==
Baur's F10 bodywork was also procured by the East German IFA concern. IFA had been building the former DKW F8 as the IFA F8 since 1949; Baur had extra capacity after the F89 had been introduced at Ingolstadt, and sold convertible bodies to IFA, thus producing cars that were largely identical to the DKW F10. About 250 of these Baur IFA F8 cars were built from the latter part of 1950 to about 1952. These were sold as the IFA F8 Luxus-Cabriolet and were only available in export markets.
