= DKW Schnellaster =

Van produced by DKW from 1949 to 1962

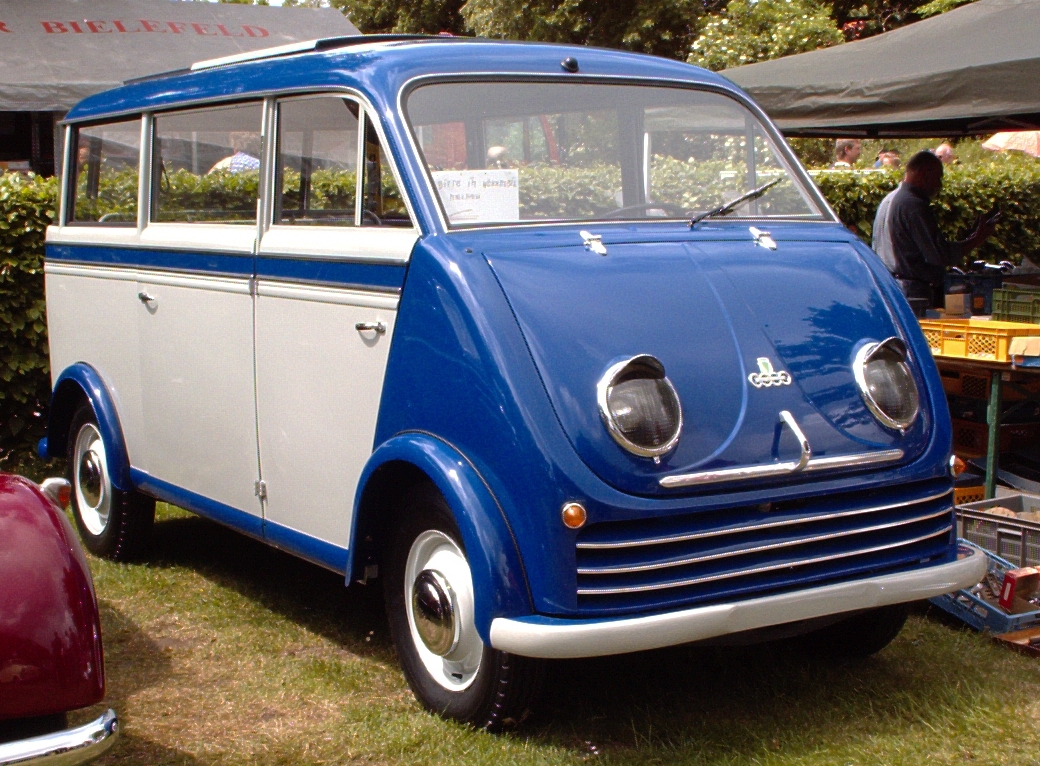
- 1954 DKW Schnellaster F 89 L minibus

Overview
- Manufacturer: DKW (Auto Union)
- Also called: Donau-Sisu (Finland)
- Production: 1949–1962
- Assembly: West Germany: Ingolstadt; Argentina: Sauce Viejo (IASFSA); Finland: Karis (Suomen Autoteollisuus); Spain: Vitoria-Gasteiz (IMOSA); Ireland: Ballincollig (Hennessy’s)

Body and chassis
- Class: Light commercial vehicle
- Body style: panel van, minibus, pickup
- Layout: FWD layout

Powertrain
- Engine: 0.7 L I2 two-stroke 0.8 L I2 two-stroke 0.9 L I3 two-stroke

Dimensions
- Wheelbase: 2,500 mm (98.4 in) – 3,000 mm (118.1 in) (pickup)
- Length: 3,930 mm (154.7 in) – 4,455 mm (175.4 in) (pickup)
- Width: 1,550 mm (61.0 in) – 1,670 mm (65.7 in)

Chronology
- Successor: DKW F1000 L

The DKW Schnellaster, also known as the DKW F89 L, was a van produced by DKW from 1949 to 1962. Alongside the DKW F89 passenger car, it was the first vehicle to be manufactured by the new Auto Union conglomerate in Ingolstadt following the re-establishment of the business in West Germany. The model name Schnell-Laster translates from German to English as Rapid Transporter.

== Design ==
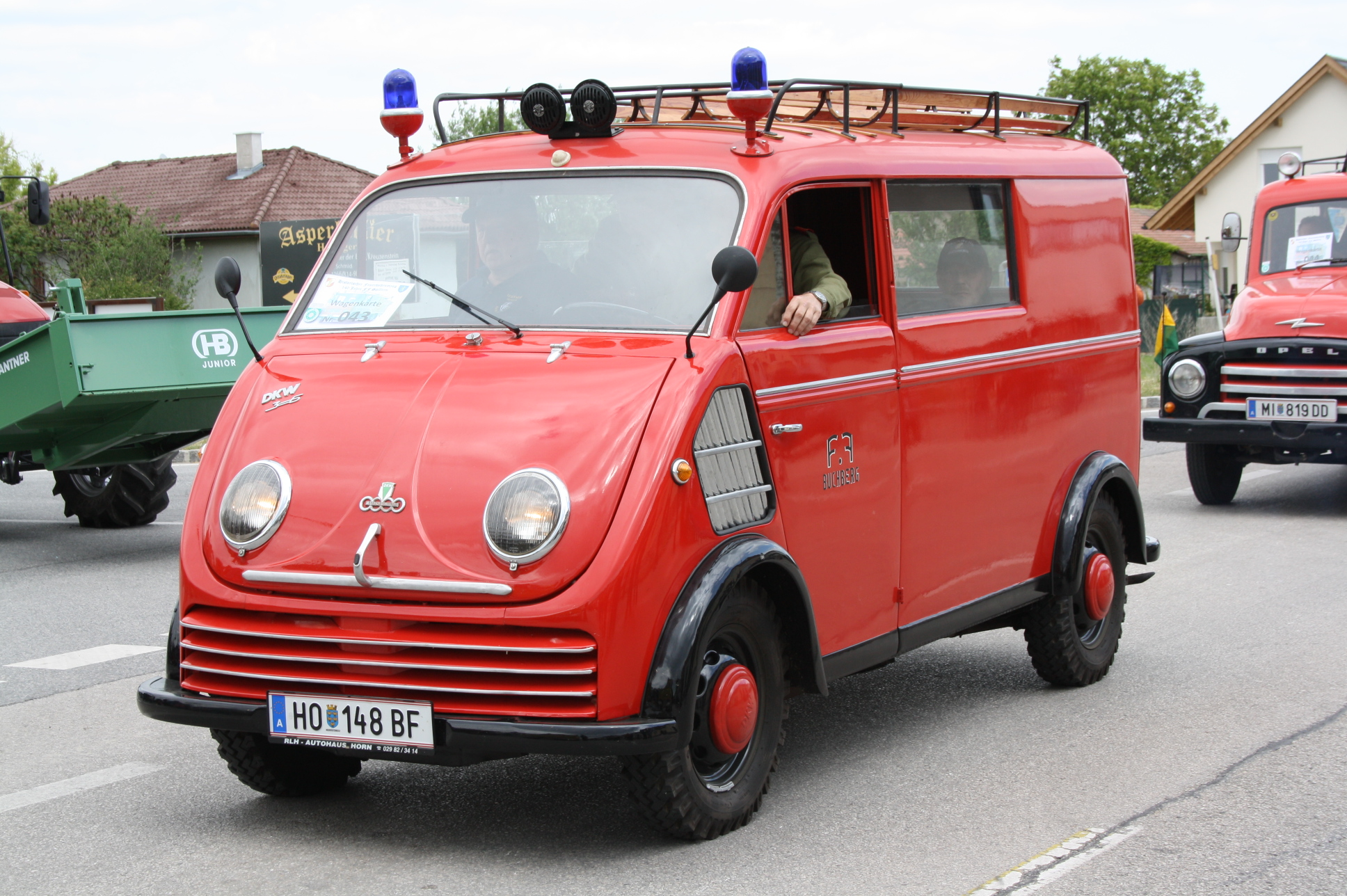
DKW Schnellaster van

The Schnellaster is of a one box or monospace configuration featuring front wheels set forward in the passenger cabin, a short sloping aerodynamic hood, front wheel drive, transverse engine (early, two cylinder models only), flat load floor throughout with flexible seating and cargo accommodations. These same features make the Schnellaster a precursor of the modern minivan, a body configuration subsequently popularized in notable examples such as the Renault Espace, or the Chrysler Voyager/Dodge Caravan and, mechanically, of the BMC Mini plus most modern cars.

The van included a trailing arm rear suspension system incorporating springs in the cross bar assembly. The modern layout featured a prewar two-cylinder 700 cc two-stroke engine of the DKW F8 rated at 20 hp (22 hp after 1952). In 1955 the van (Typ 3) received the DKW F9's three cylinder unit with 900 cc, producing 32 hp (24 kW).

The van's layout enabled a flat loading floor only 40 cm (16 in) off the ground. It was also fitted with a large single rear door fitted to hinges on the right-hand side.

== World markets ==
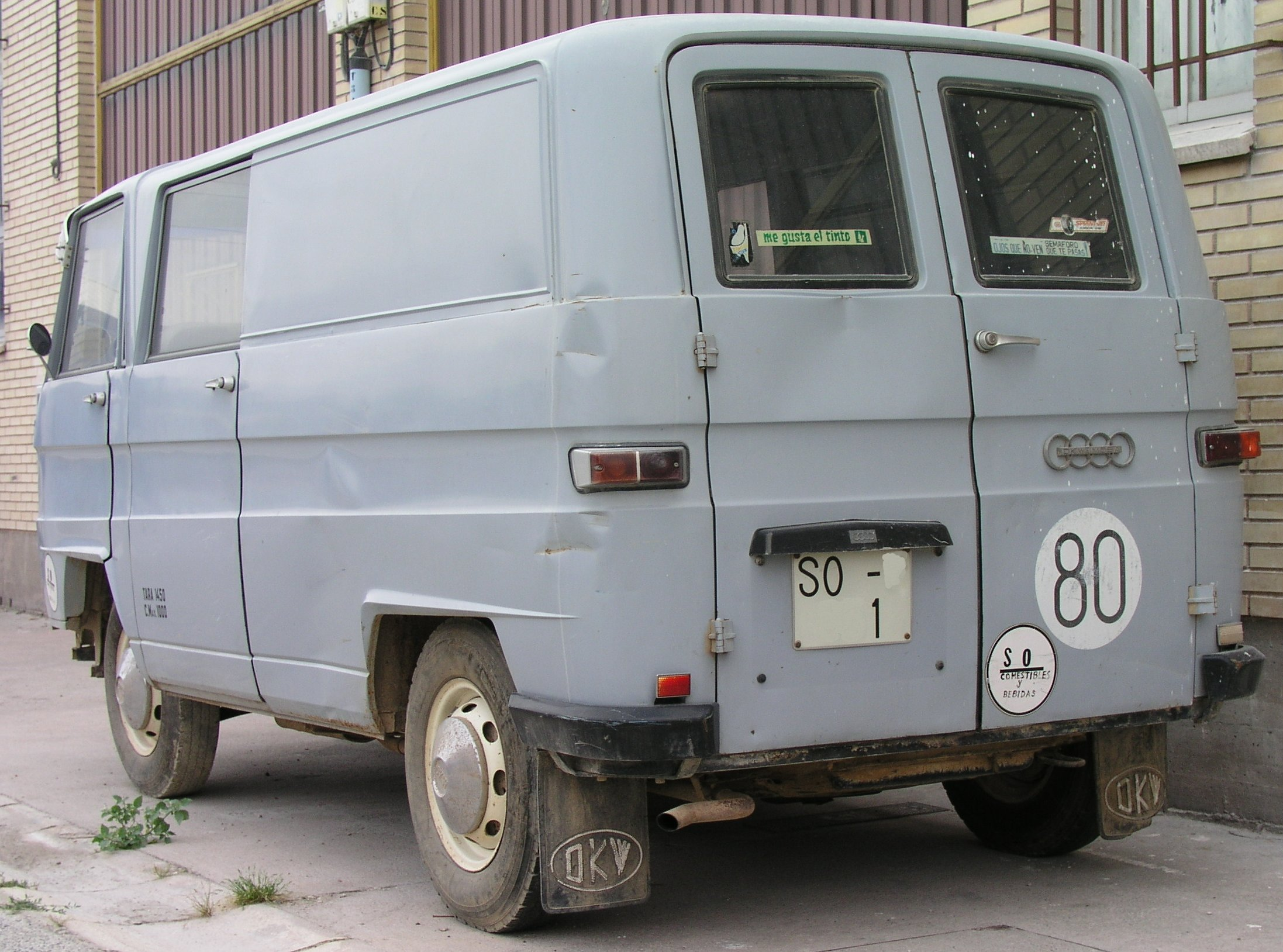
Spanish built DKW F 1000 L van

The van was also produced in Vitoria, Spain, by subsidiary Industrias del Motor S.A. (IMOSA) from 1954. In Spain, DKW became a common term for any van, and is still used today. The Spanish subsidiary also produced a modern successor with all new bodywork, introduced in 1963 and called the DKW F1000 L. This van started with the three-cylinder 981 cc two-stroke DKW engine, but later received a Mercedes-Benz Diesel engine and was finally renamed a Mercedes-Benz in 1975.

The Finnish heavy vehicle producer Suomen Autoteollisuus assembled a series of ten Schnellasters in Karis, Finland, at the turn of November 1956. The vehicle was branded Donau-Sisu. The bodies were welded in Finland by use of fixtures delivered from West Germany. Welding of the complete body took just two hours per unit. Plans were in place for a larger scale production but it was not started because the technically archaic vehicle did not meet the needs of the potential Finnish customers. One repairable Donau-Sisu has survived and saved by vintage vehicle enthusiasts at the end of 2011.

=== Argentina ===
From 1960 to 1969 the DKW van was manufactured under licence by Industrias Automotriz de Santa Fe (IASFe) in Argentina as the Auto Union Combi, Pickup, Furgón (van) and Ambulance after producing the Schnellaster for 10 years. The factory had closed its doors, but Industrias Mecánicas del Estado (IAME) continued production of the DKW F1000 L as the Rastrojero Frontalito from 1969 until 1979 in single and double cab pickup and flatbed, minibus, and van versions. The Frontalito F 71 received the Indenor 1948 cc XD88 diesel engine, as did so many other Rastrojero vehicles. Claimed power is 60 CV (44 kW; 59 hp) DIN. In 1974 the Frontalito was updated and was now called the SM 81.

== See also ==
- Tempo Matador
- VW T1
