= Wartburg 311 =

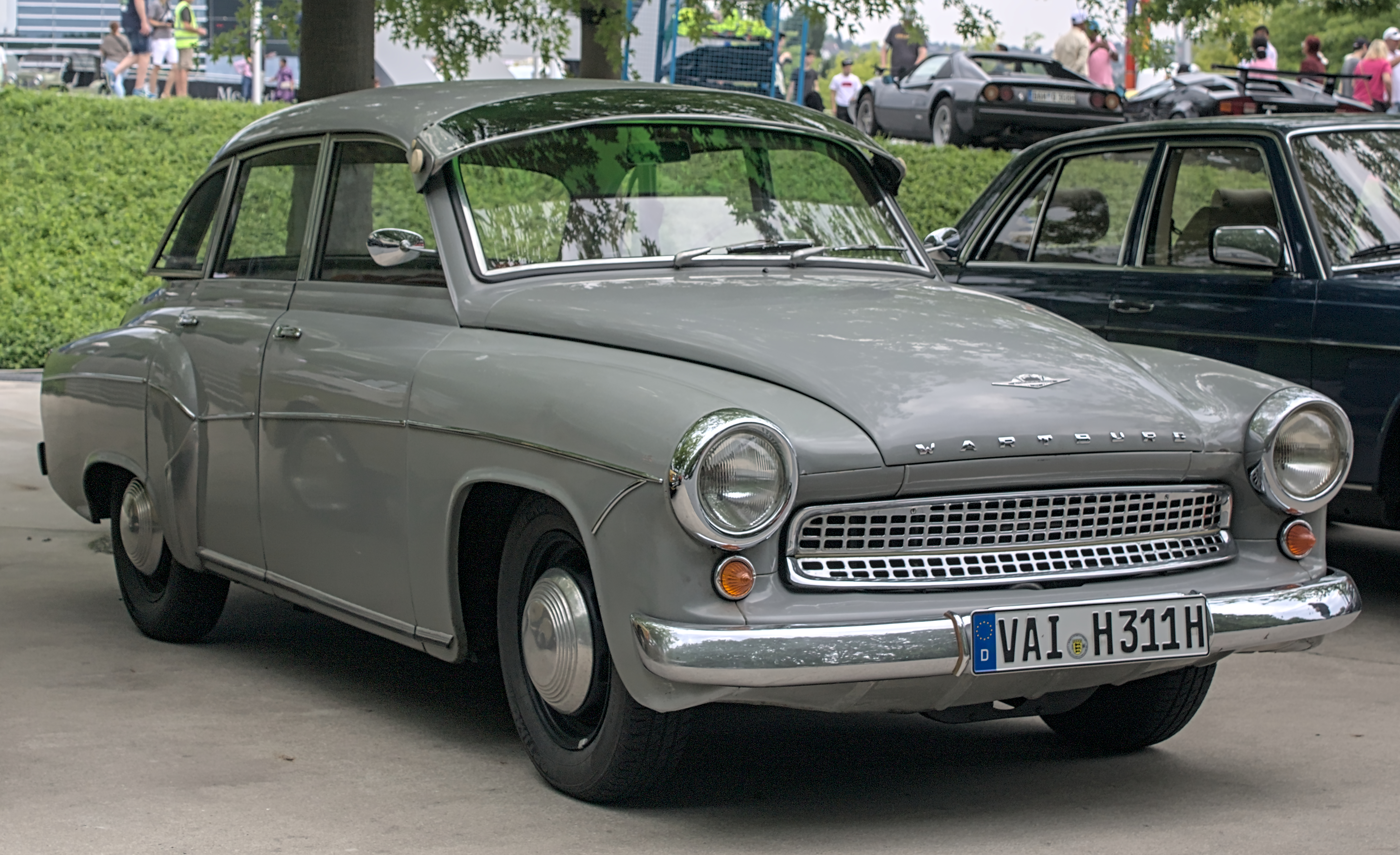
- Wartburg 311 Limousine

Overview
- Manufacturer: VEB Automobilwerk Eisenach
- Also called: Wartburg 312; Wartburg 313 Sport
- Production: 311: 1956–1965; 288,535 produced 312: September 1965 – March 1967
- Assembly: East Germany: Eisenach
- Designer: Hans Fleischer

Body and chassis
- Body style: 4-door saloon; 3/5-door estate; 2-door pickup truck; 2-door coupé; 2-door roadster
- Layout: Longitudinal FF layout

Powertrain
- Engine: 0.9L (901 cc) two-stroke I3 (1956–1962); 1.0L (992 cc) two-stroke I3 (1962–1967)
- Transmission: 3-speed manual (1956–1957); 4-speed manual (1958–1967)

Dimensions
- Wheelbase: 2,450 mm (96.5 in)
- Length: 4,300 mm (169.3 in)
- Width: 1,570 mm (61.8 in)
- Height: 1,450 mm (57.1 in)
- Curb weight: 960 kg (2,116 lb)

Chronology
- Predecessor: IFA F9 (EMW 309)
- Successor: Wartburg 353

The Wartburg 311 is a car produced by East German car manufacturer VEB Automobilwerk Eisenach from 1956 to 1965. The 311 model was manufactured in a number of variations, including pickup, sedan, limousine, coupé, and as a two-seat roadster. The two-stroke engine was enlarged to 992 cc in 1962. An interim model, called the Wartburg 312 and featuring the chassis developed for the succeeding 353, was built from 1965 until 1967.

== Background ==
Production of the Wartburg 311 was already underway at Eisenach by the end of 1955. The car was a development of the existing EMW 309. This was the car previously identified as the IFA F9, which, in turn, had been based on the 1940 DKW F9 scheduled for launch in 1940 until the Second World War intervened.

== The car ==
The basic architecture of the pre-war design, acquired from Zwickau-based Auto Union, was retained, albeit with the chassis lengthened by 10 cm, which combined with long overhangs to create a larger car with a relatively spacious four-door sedan/saloon body.

The name "Wartburg" came from the very first model (Wartburgwagen) produced in 1898 at the Automobilwerk Eisenach factory, three decades before that company was acquired by BMW, and nearly five decades before the plant's location, following the defeat of Third Reich, in the Soviet occupation zone placed it under state control. The "311" designation followed the tradition of the plant's previous owner, BMW, whose Eisenach-produced passenger cars had all been identified by a three-digit number starting with a "3".

The use of a separate chassis facilitated the adaptation of the car to a range of differing body shapes. On the other hand, the use of a separate chassis with the frame rails running under the passenger compartment's floor during a period when automakers elsewhere in Europe were increasingly standardizing on self-supporting car bodies, left the Wartburg approach looking increasingly dated, and also added to the car's height, while "low-long-sleek" was becoming the order of the day in car styling.

The 313-1 was a two-seat roadster, sold as the Wartburg Sport, built from 1957 until 1960. Of 469 cars that were built, about one-third were exported to the United States. A plethora of other body styles were available, including a rare four-door military utility roadster, coupés, and several station wagon versions.

== Export markets ==
Exports of the Wartburg 311 to West Germany beginning in 1958, and by the early 1960s the car was exported to many other countries, including the United Kingdom and United States. In all, 737 right-hand-drive 311s were built from 1961 until 1964.

== Argentinian production ==
In Argentina a small two-door sedan with small, two-stroke two- and four-cylinder engines had been built by IAME in Córdoba between 1952 and 1955 as the Justicialista. After the 1955 coup d'état, IAME was renamed DINFIA. From 1956 it was equipped with the 901 cc engine from the Wartburg 311, it looked mostly the same, but its name was changed to Graciela. It was built in 2280 examples until 1961. Pickup and van versions were also available. From 1962 the local bodywork was replaced with that of the four-door Wartburg 311; this was sold as the Graciela W. It retained the same engine, and 646 were built until 1964.

== Replacement ==
The succeeding, boxier 353 model was to receive a modernized chassis with independently coil sprung wheels, with a significantly better ride. Before the arrival of the 353, there was an interim model, the Wartburg 312 (September 1965 – March 1967). It had the updated chassis and also had smaller 13-inch wheels. The chassis also no longer needed regular lubrication. The 353 parts were gradually installed in the 312 as they were ready, meaning that later models were equipped with the 50 PS (37 kW; 49 hp) engine, rather than the 45 PS (33 kW; 44 hp) unit from the 311. Some were also equipped with disc brakes at the front. Some enthusiasts replace the body of a 353 with the body of a 311 on the same chassis, which does not require major modifications, thus making a more old-fashioned car with modern underpinnings. The smoother riding 312 is very popular in the German veteran car scene today for precisely those reasons.

The 312 continued to be available with a wide variety of body styles until the late-1966 arrival of the 353, after which only the estate and the station wagon remained on sale. As with the 353 Tourist, these models were built by the VEB Karosseriewerk Halle, rather than in the Eisenach main plant.

== Variants ==
=== Wartburg 311 ===
- 311/0 Standard Limousine (four-door saloon)
- 311/1 Luxus-Limousine (four-door luxury saloon)
- 311/2 Cabriolet two-door (from March 1956)
- 311/3 Coupé 2-door
- 311/4 Kübelwagen (Police off-road), with only 891 produced from 1959–1964
- 311/5 Camping-Limousine (five-door estate)
- 311/6 Limousine (RHD four-door saloon)
- 311/7 pickup two-door (from March 1956)
- 311/8 Schiebedach-Limousine (four-door saloon, with sunroof)
- 311/108 Luxus-Limousine (four-door luxury saloon with sliding sunroof)
- 311/9 Kombi (estate) 3-door (from March 1956)
- 311-300 Hardtop Coupé (HT) 2-door
- 313/1 Sportwagen (two-door roadster / from the spring of 1957, with 50 hp)
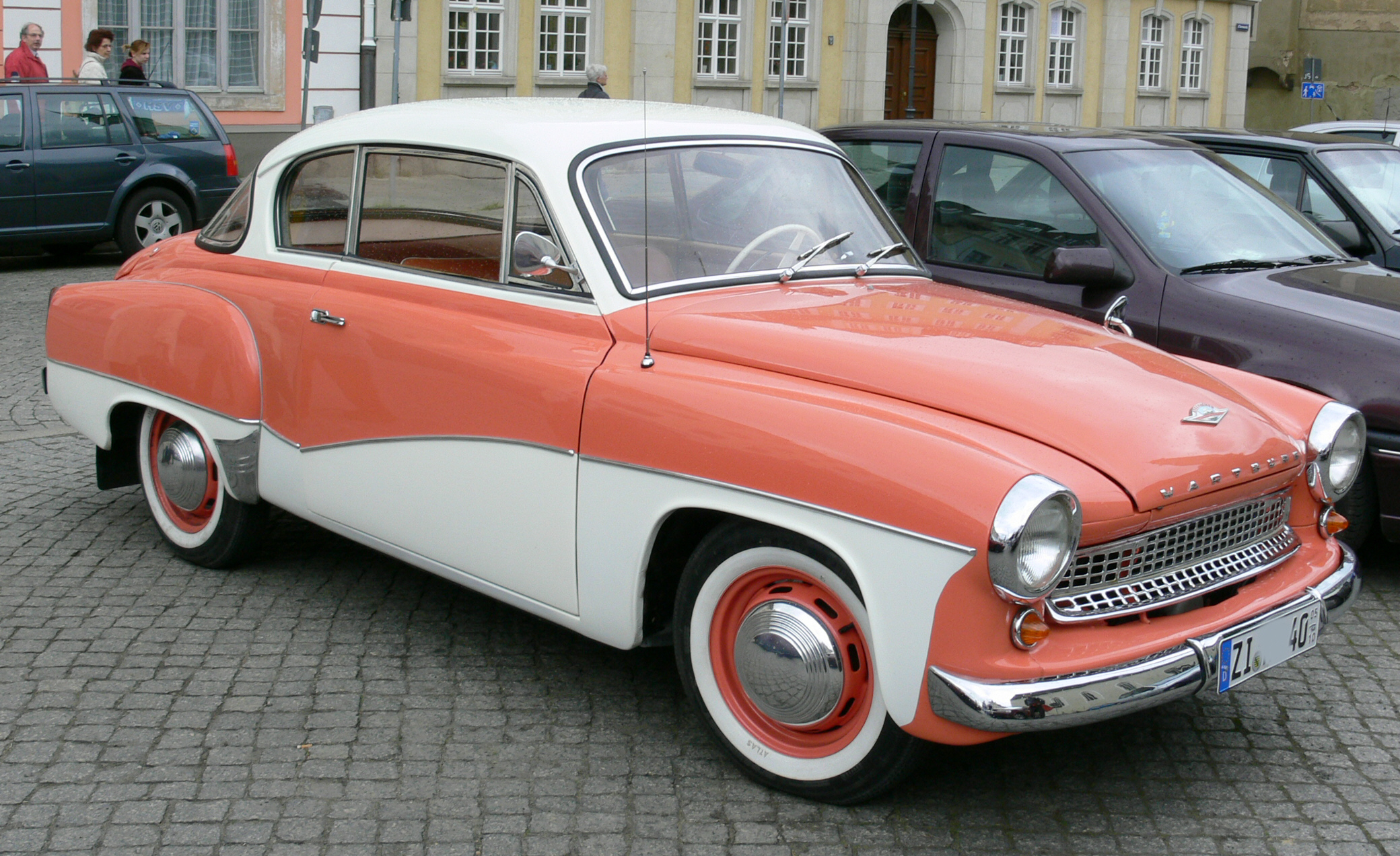
Wartburg 311/3 Coupé

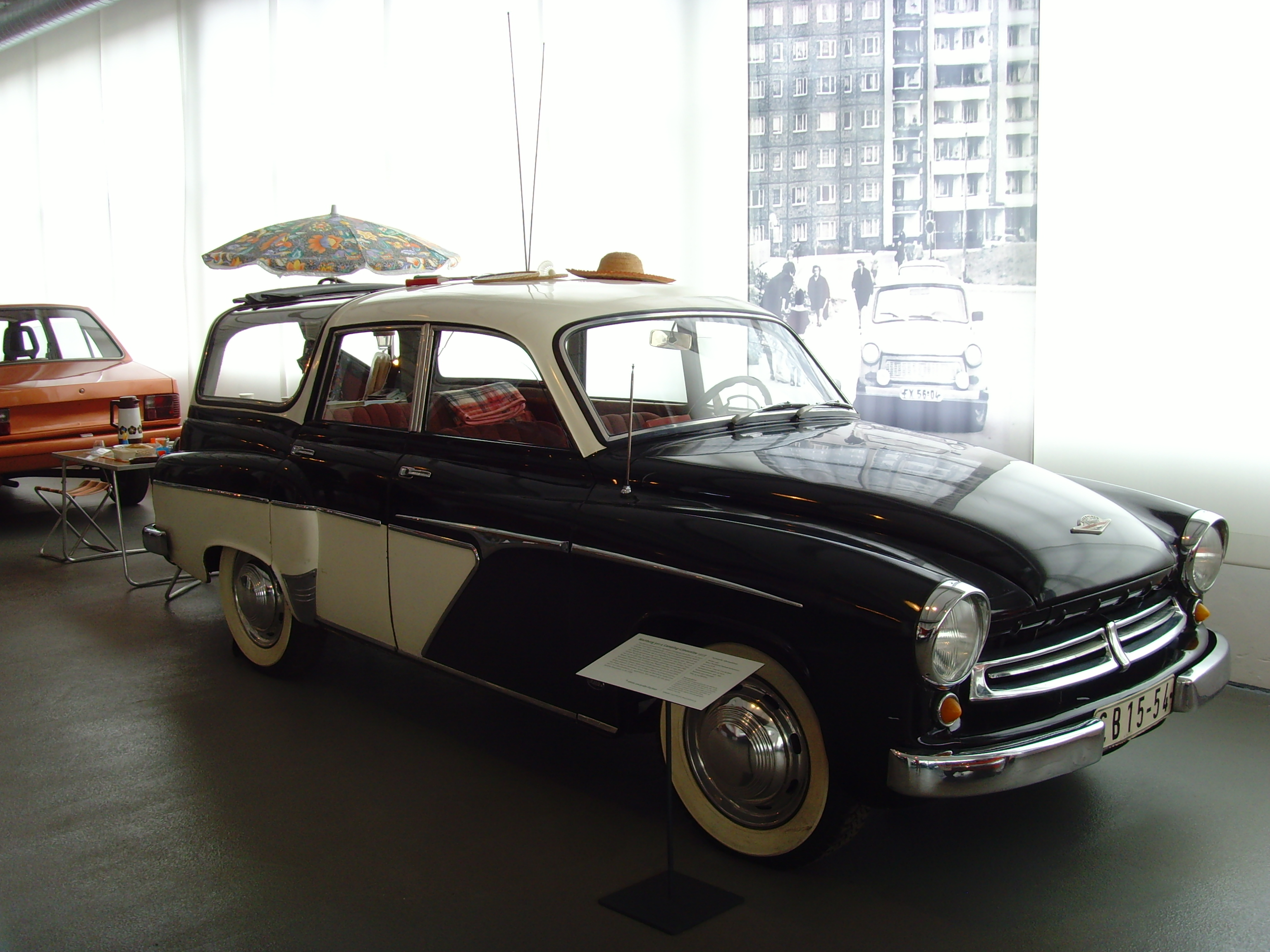
Wartburg 311/5 Camping Limousine

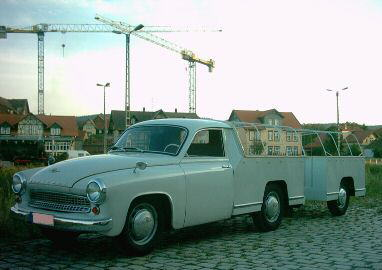
Wartburg 311/7 pickup

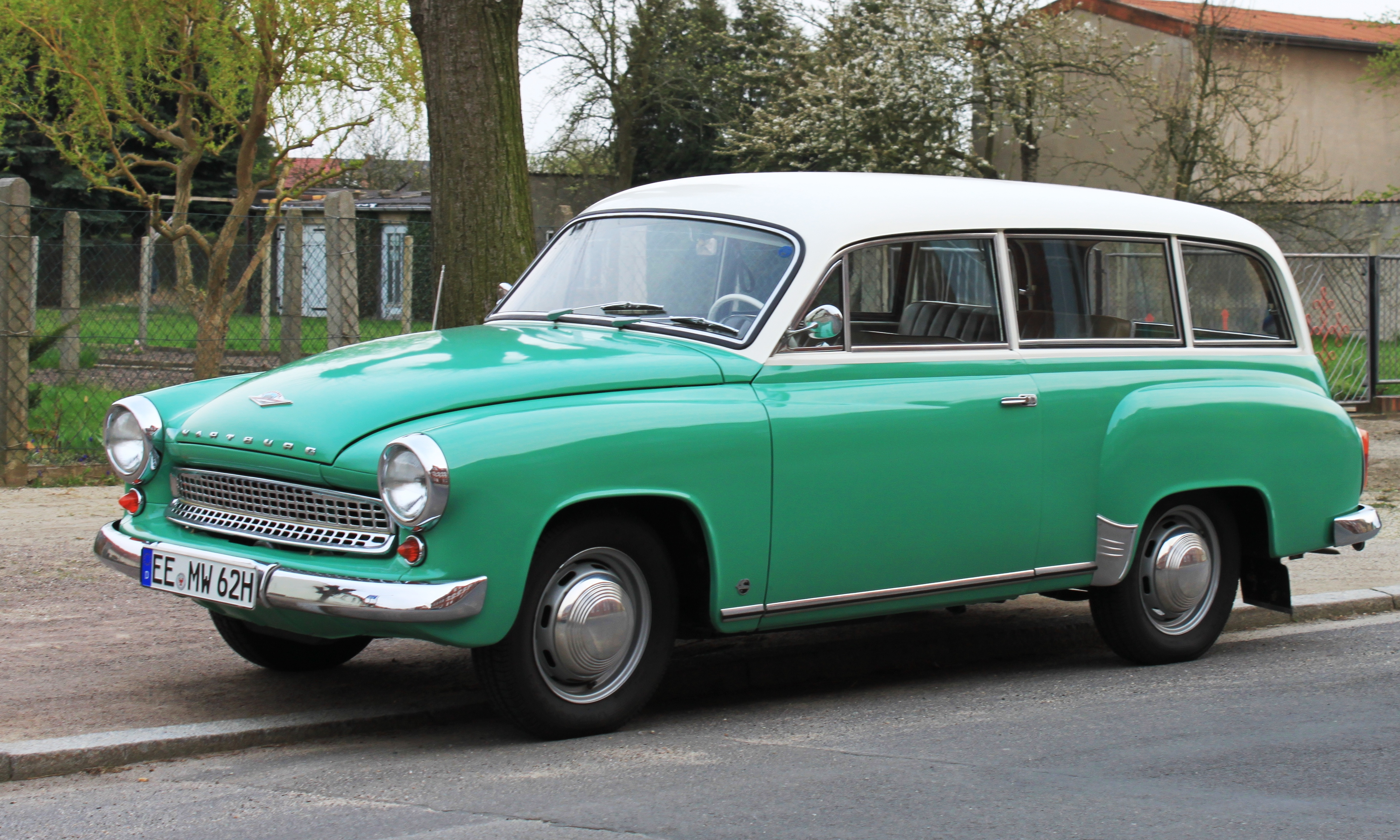
Wartburg 311/9 Kombi

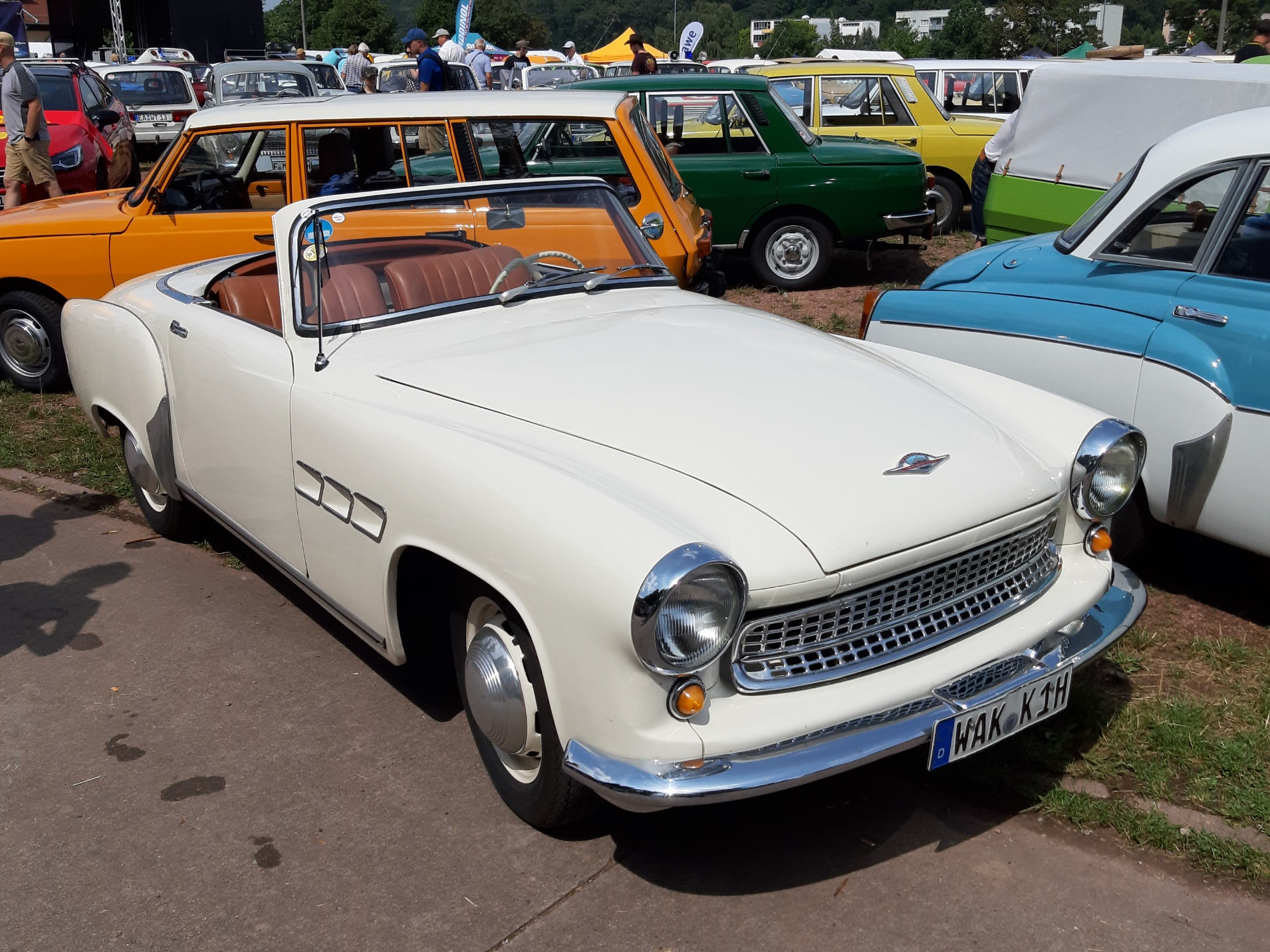
Wartburg 313/1 Sportwagen

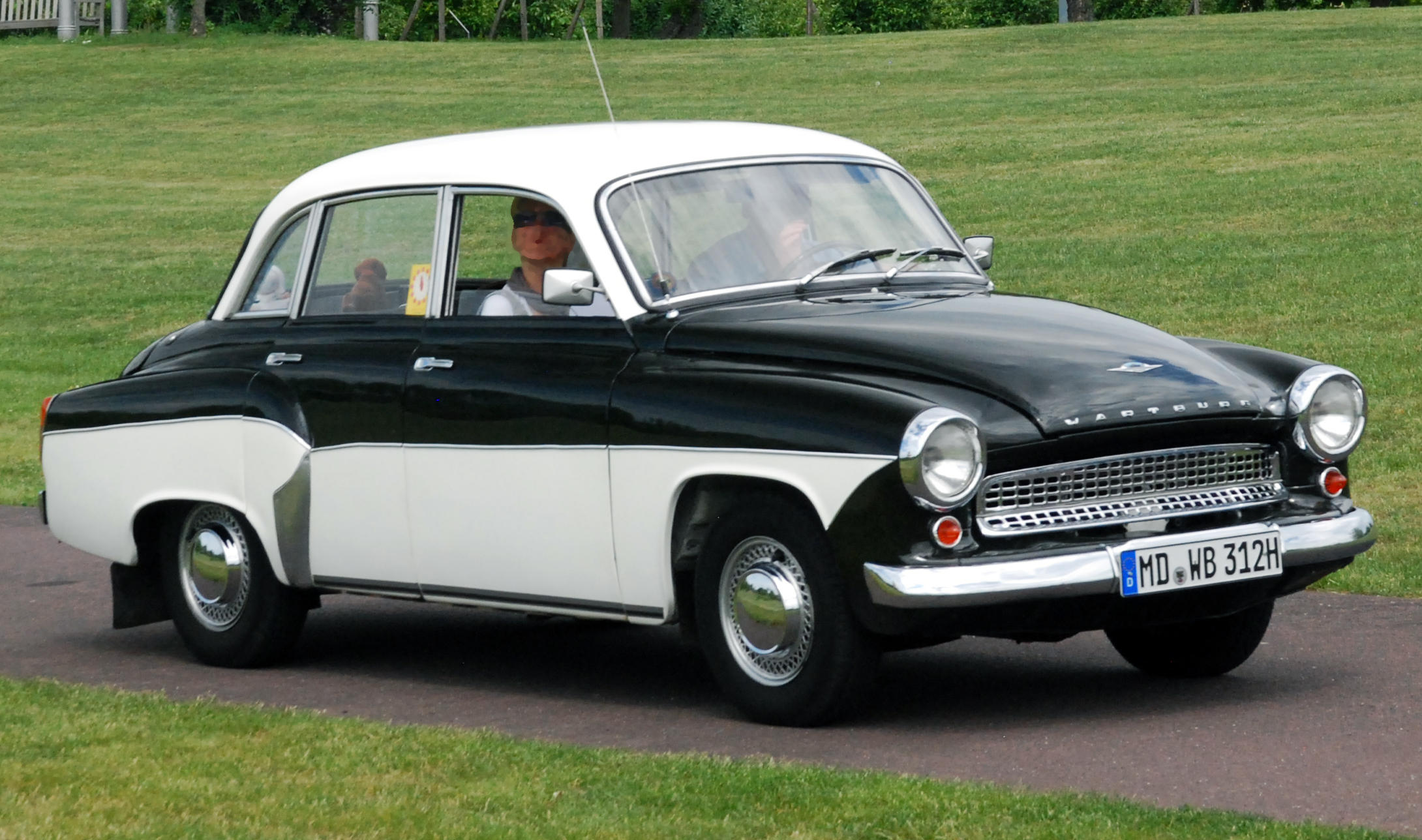
Wartburg 312 saloon

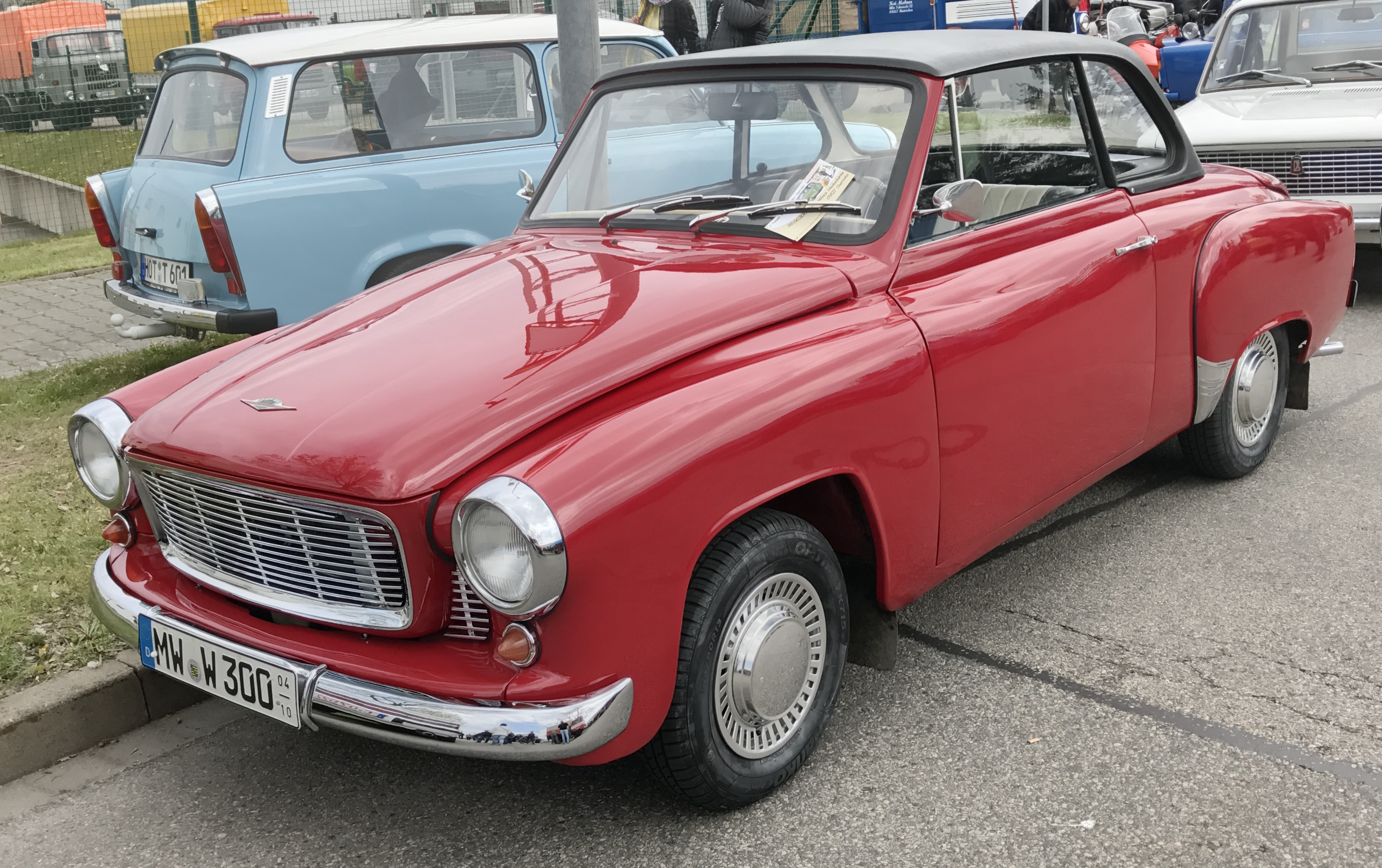
Wartburg 312-300 HT Coupé

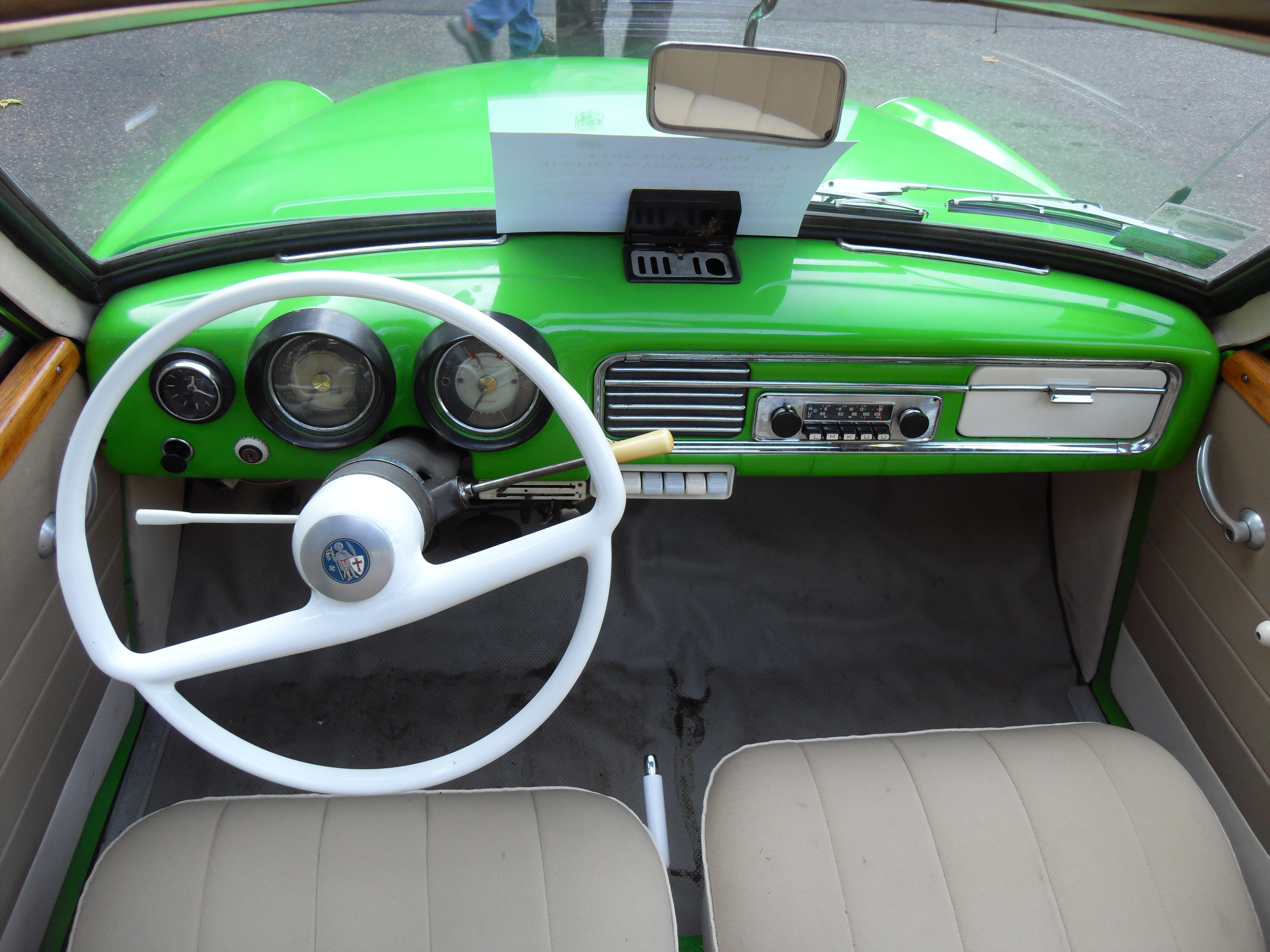
Wartburg 311 interior

=== Wartburg 312 ===
- 312/0 Standard Limousine (4-door saloon)
- 312/1 Luxus-Limousine (4-door saloon)
- 312/5 Camping-Limousine (5-door station wagon)
- 312-300 Hardtop-Coupé (HT) 2-door
- 312 Pick-up truck. It is unknown whether they were made by the factory, or were later conversions. However, the later 353 was available as pickup truck.
