= DKW F89 =

Car model

DKW Meisterklasse DKW F89
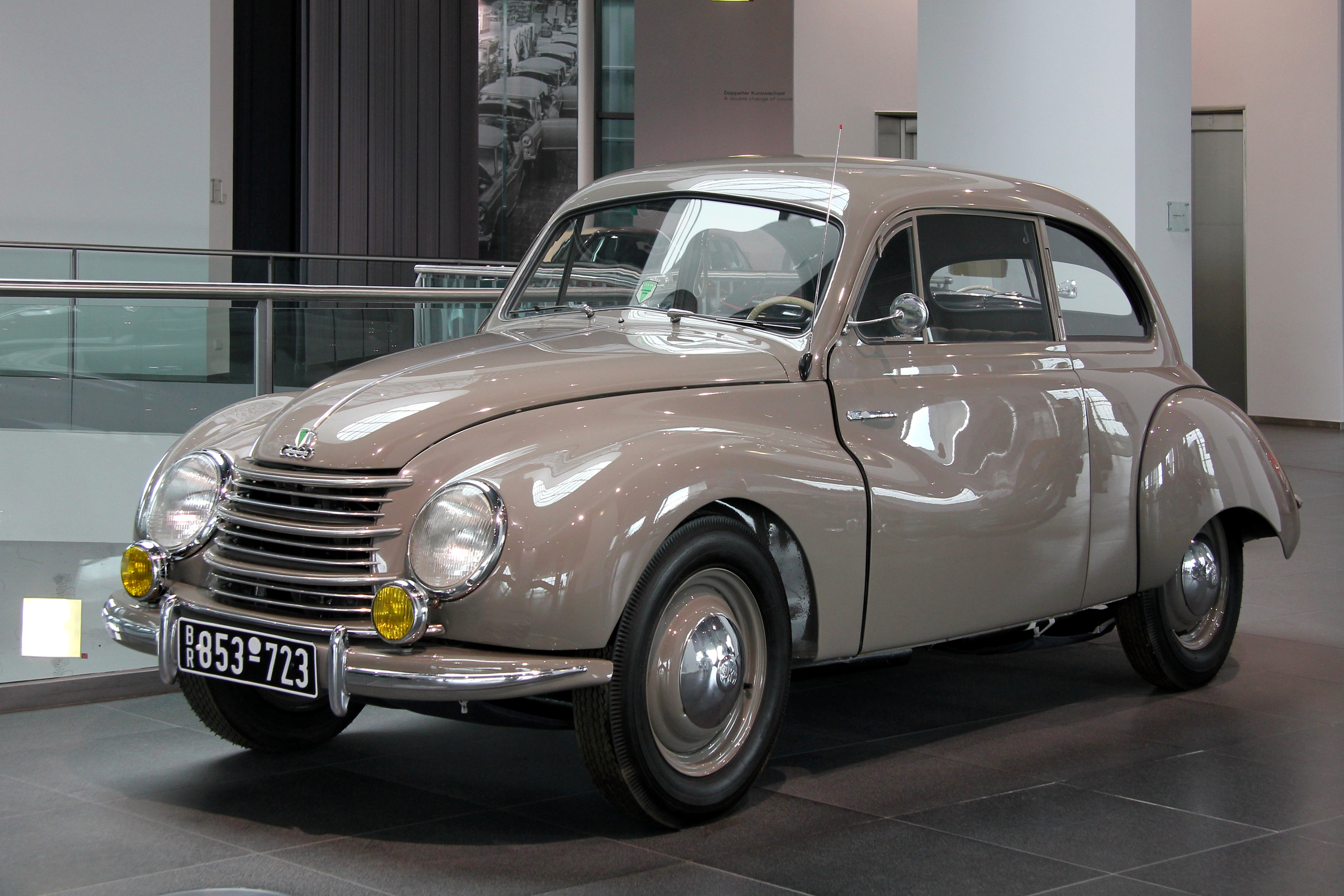
- DKW F89 2-door saloon

Overview
- Manufacturer: Auto Union
- Production: 1950–April 1954
- Assembly: Germany: Düsseldorf

Body and chassis
- Class: Small family car (C)
- Body style: 2-door saloon 3-door 'Universal' Estate; 2-door cabriolet
- Layout: FF layout
- Related: DKW Schnellaster; IFA F9

Powertrain
- Engine: 684 cc two-stroke I2
- Transmission: 3-speed manual 4-speed manual (offered from 1953)

Dimensions
- Wheelbase: 2,350 mm (93 in) (2-door); 2,450 mm (96 in) (Estate)
- Length: 4,200 mm (170 in) (saloon)
- Curb weight: 860–900 kg (1,900–1,980 lb) (empty)

Chronology
- Predecessor: DKW F10
- Successor: DKW 3=6

The DKW Meisterklasse (English: "Master Class"), also known as the DKW F89, is a compact front-wheel drive saloon manufactured by Auto Union GmbH between 1950 and 1954. It was the first passenger car to be manufactured by the new Auto Union company in West Germany following the re-establishment of the business in the west in 1949.

== The Factory ==
Apart from the former DKW factory at Berlin-Spandau, the Auto Union's manufacturing plants had been located in Saxony at Zwickau, Chemnitz and Zschopau when war had put an end to passenger vehicle production in 1942. After the war the company was no longer able to access its production facilities in the Soviet occupation zone. The first post war DKWs were therefore built under contract in a refurbished plant by Rheinmetall-Borsig in Düsseldorf.

== The Origins ==
The F89 shared its underpinnings with the DKW F8 / 'Meisterklasse' which had been available between 1939 and 1942, but the F89 has a steel body based on that of the DKW F9, a prototype which would have directly replaced the F8 on the Zwickau production lines had the war not intervened. Although many of the machine tools at that plant were crated up and shipped to the Soviet Union in 1945, Zwickau's new controllers also built their own version of the DKW F9 prototype, and indeed the eastern version was put into production as the IFA F9, probably shortly before the Düsseldorf built F89.

The F89 was not the first vehicle built by Auto Union after the war. That honor goes to the DKW F89 L “Schnelllaster”, Rapid Transporter in English, a curiously modern light van built on the same chassis and using the same engine / transmission package, introduced in 1949.

== The Body ==
The form of the saloon's body closely followed that of the prewar DKW F9. However, extensive 'streamlining' had been applied to the earlier design, and impressive claims were made for the F89's lowered wind resistance.

In 1951 a two-seater hardtop coupe version, built by coach builders Hebmüller of Wuppertal became available, and the range was completed in October 1951 with the addition of a three-door estate version, employing a body conversion that made extensive use of timber, which was replaced in March 1953 by an all-steel body. The F89 estate, like its steel bodied, successors, was branded as the 'Universal'.

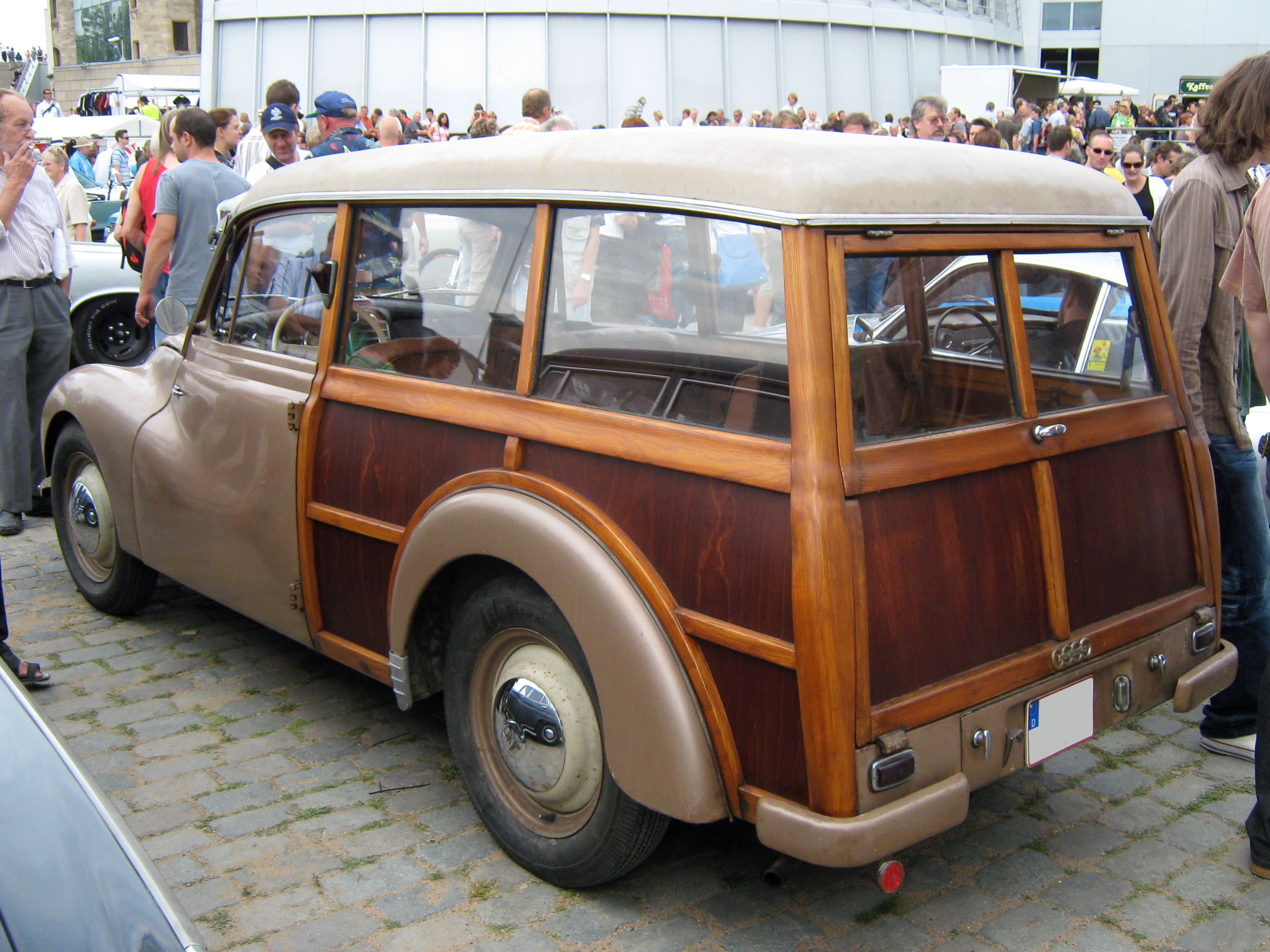
The estate conversion, offered from late 1951, made extensive use of timber.

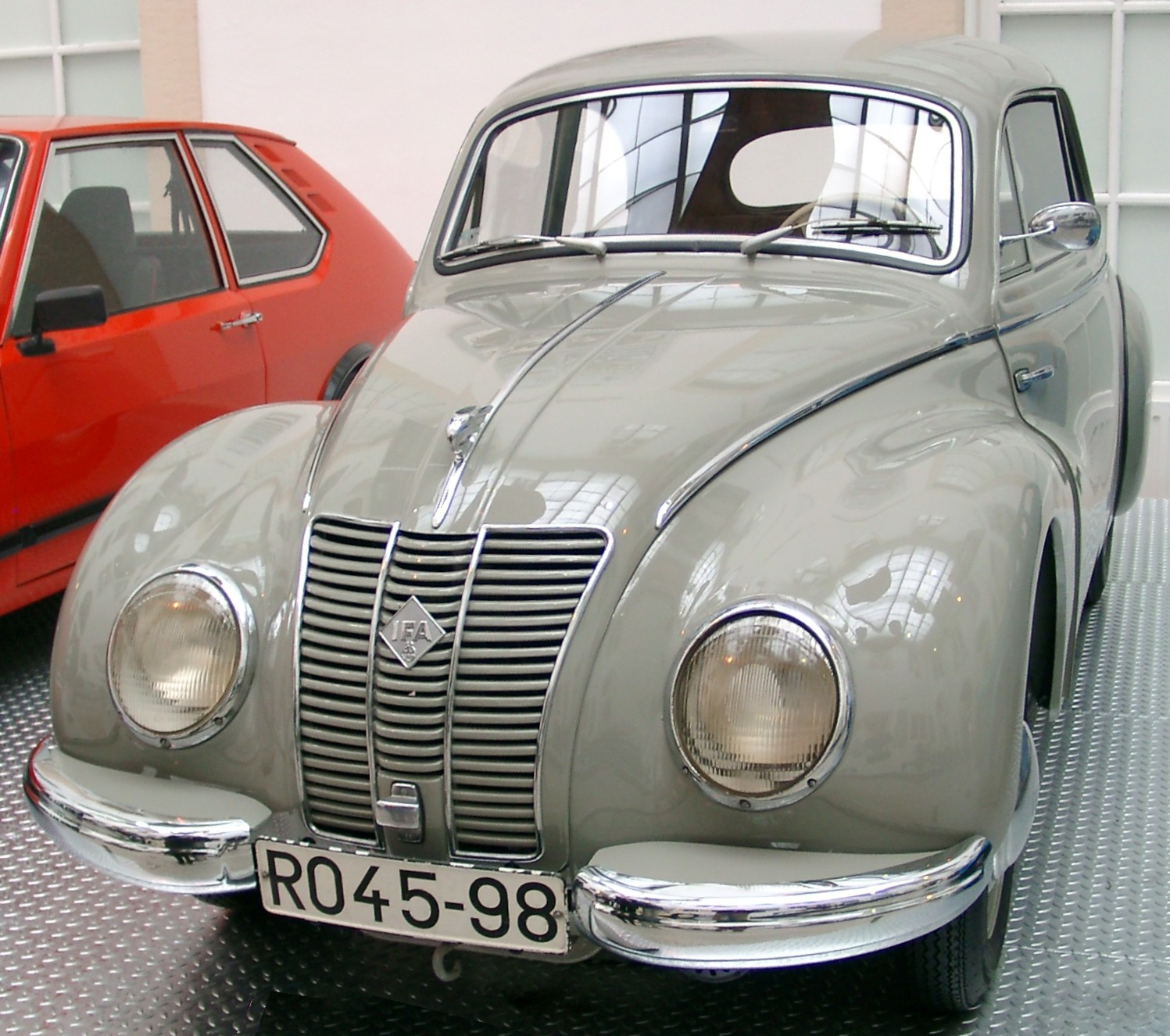
While Auto Union built the F89 in West Germany, the Zwickau plant that had passed to the Soviet-controlled GDR was producing the IFA F9. 30,000 or more IFA F9s had been produced initially at Zwickau and subsequently at Eisenach by 1956. Both western and eastern cars were closely based on the DKW F9 prototype first exhibited in 1939.

== Technical ==
The F89 featured a two-cylinder two-stroke engine of 684 cc with a stated output, at launch, of 23 bhp. A maximum speed of 100 km/h (62 mph) was claimed for the saloon (95 km/h (59 mph) for the 'Universal' estate). The engine was water-cooled, but there was no water pump. Cooling was by a convection-based thermosiphon system. The front wheels were connected to the engine by means of a three-speed manual gear box controlled via a dash-board mounted Krückstockschaltung lever similar to that familiar to later generations from its application in the Citroën 2CV and Renault 4. Towards the end of the production run a four-speed manual box was offered on the Meisterklasse.

== Data ==
Technical data DKW F89 / Meisterklasse (Manufacturer's figures except where stated)
	F89 2-door saloon	F89 3-door estate
Produced:	1950–1954	1953 -
Engine:	2-cylinder-inline engine (two-stroke), transversely front-mounted	
Bore × Stroke:	76 mm × 76 mm	
Displacement:	684 cc	
Max. Power at rpm:	23 hp (17 kW) at 4500	
Cooling:	Water cooling 'Thermosyphon' gravity powered	
Fuel feed:	single Solex carburetor	
Transmission:	3-speed manual driving front wheels: 4-speed optional after 1953. Facia mounted control lever	
Body structure:	Separate steel body on box-frame chassis	
Wheelbase:	2,350 mm (93 in)	2,450 mm (96 in)
Track front/ rear:	1,190 mm (47 in) 1,250 mm (49 in)	1,190 mm (47 in) 1,250 mm (49 in)
Length:	4,200 mm (170 in)	4,055 mm (159.6 in)
Width:	1,600 mm (63 in)	1,520 mm (60 in)
Height:	1,450 mm (57 in)	1,555 mm (61.2 in)
Dry weight:	860 kg (1,900 lb)	900 kg (2,000 lb)
Tyre/Tire sizes:	5.50–16“ 1950–1953; 5.60–15“ 1953–1954	

== See also ==
- DKW Schnellaster
