= IFA F9 =

Eastern-bloc compact saloon car model

IFA F9 / EMW 309
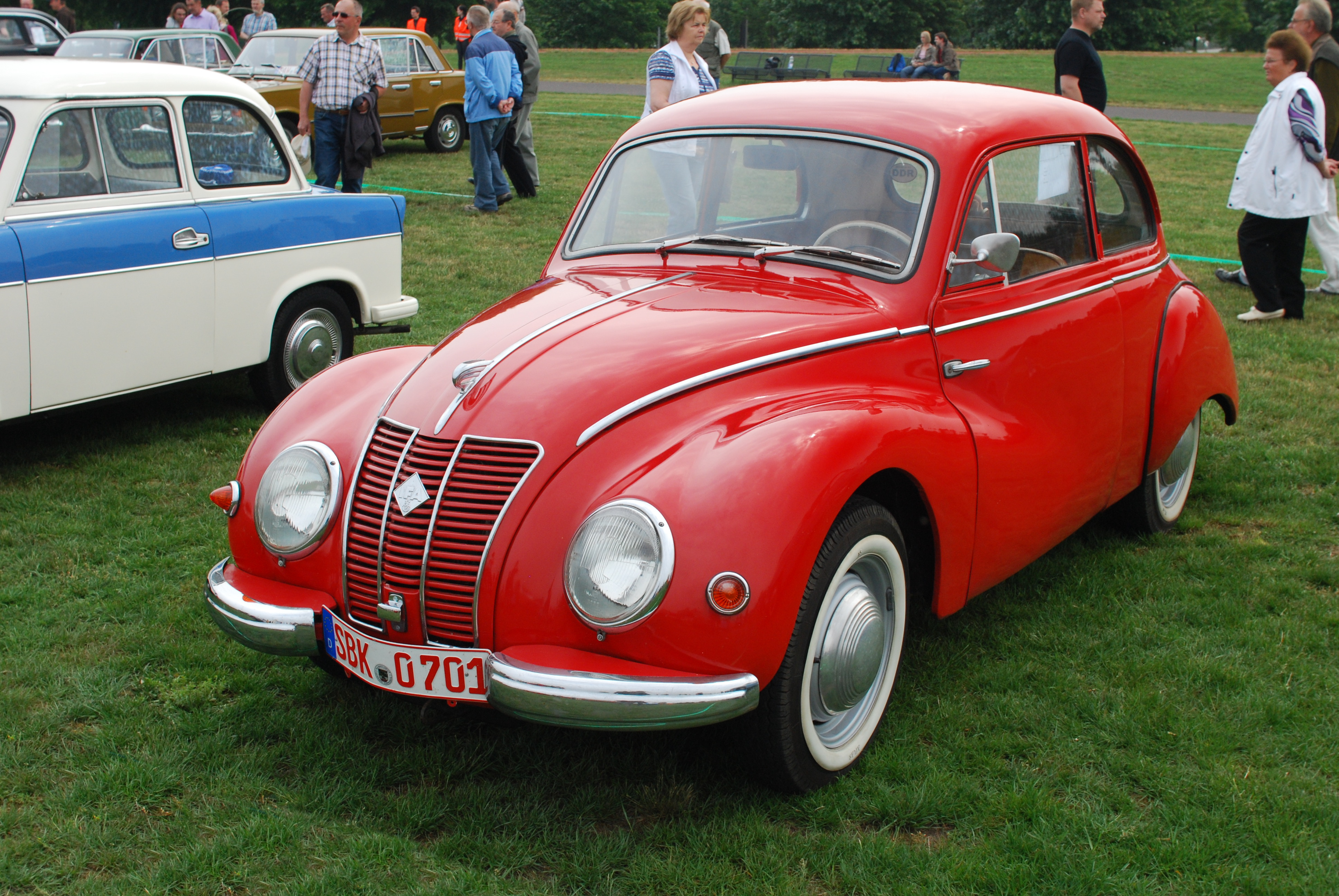

Overview
- Manufacturer: Automobilwerk Zwickau (1950–1953); Automobilwerk Eisenach (1953–1956)
- Production: 1950 – April 1956; 40,663 produced
- Assembly: East Germany: Zwickau (IFA); East Germany: Eisenach (EMW)

Body and chassis
- Body style: 2 door saloon 2-door cabriolet 3-door estate
- Layout: FF layout
- Related: DKW F89

Powertrain
- Engine: 910 cc two-stroke straight-3 28 / 30 bhp
- Transmission: 4-speed manual

Dimensions
- Wheelbase: 2,350 mm (93 in)
- Length: 4,200 mm (170 in) saloon
- Width: 1,600 mm (63 in) saloon
- Height: 1,450 mm (57 in) saloon
- Curb weight: 820 kg (1,810 lb) (empty)

Chronology
- Predecessor: DKW F8
- Successor: Wartburg 311 (EMW 311)

The IFA F9, subsequently rebadged as the EMW 309, is a compact saloon manufactured under the auspices of the Russian and East German states between 1949 or 1950 and 1956. It was initially built at Zwickau at the plant previously owned by Auto Union. In 1953 production was transferred to the EMW, former BMW manufacturing plant at Eisenach under the name EMW 309 until 1956 where its underpinnings subsequently found their way into the Wartburg 311.

== Origins ==
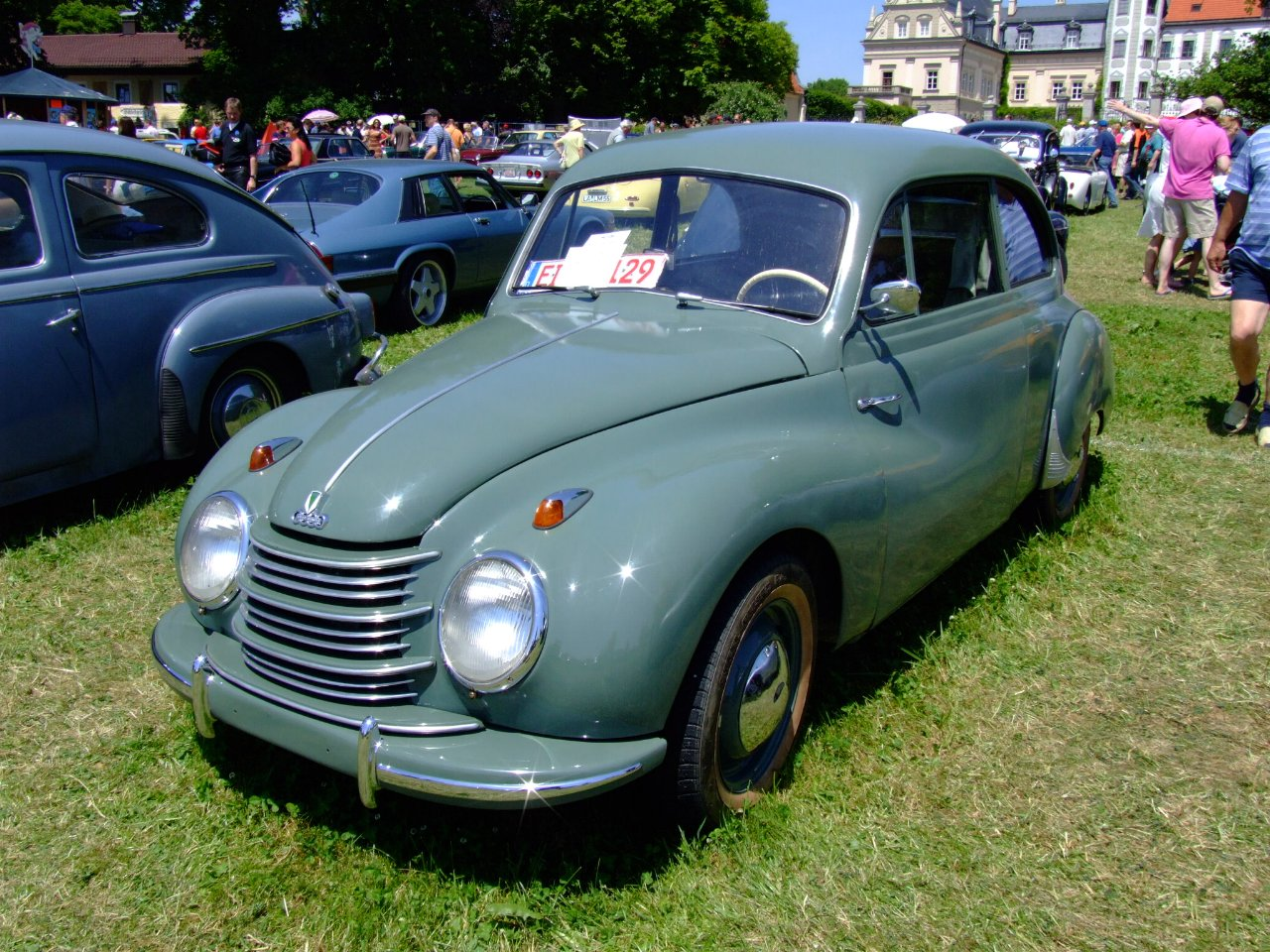
While the Zwickau plant was producing the IFA F9, in the west Auto Union launched the DKW F89 derived from the same prewar DKW F9 prototype. At this stage, however, the western car was still powered by a two-cylinder 684 cc engine.

Mechanically the F9 derived from the DKW F8 which had been available between 1939 and 1942. The body closely followed the design of the DKW F9, a prototype with which Auto Union would have replaced the F8 on the Zwickau production lines earlier, had the war not intervened. After the war, the first car assembled at Zwickau was the prewar DKW F8, but the more modern F9 started to appear in 1949 or 1950 (sources differ). Materials shortages probably delayed introduction in both German states, but the eastern car beat the western to the market, and certainly featured the three-cylinder motor from the 1938 F9 prototype (rather than the two-cylinder motor that had been in serial production in 1942) at least three years before Auto Union in Düsseldorf were installing it in their F91. The Western group, however, had access to the original F9 body tooling which had been ordered before the war and had been produced but neither delivered to Zwickau nor scrapped, instead remaining at supplier Allgaier's facility in Uhingen, Baden-Wuerttemberg.

== The bodies ==
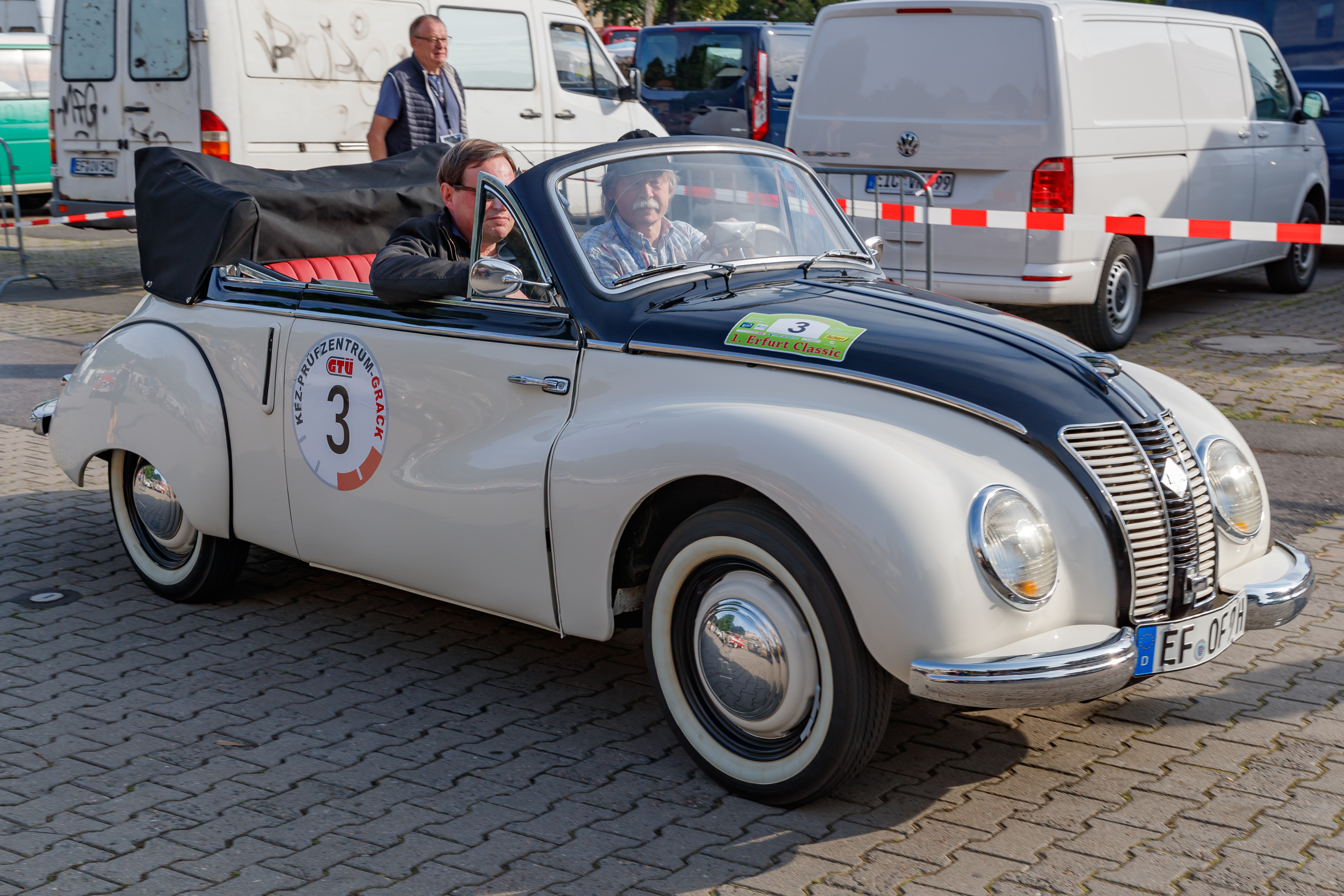
IFA F9 cabriolet

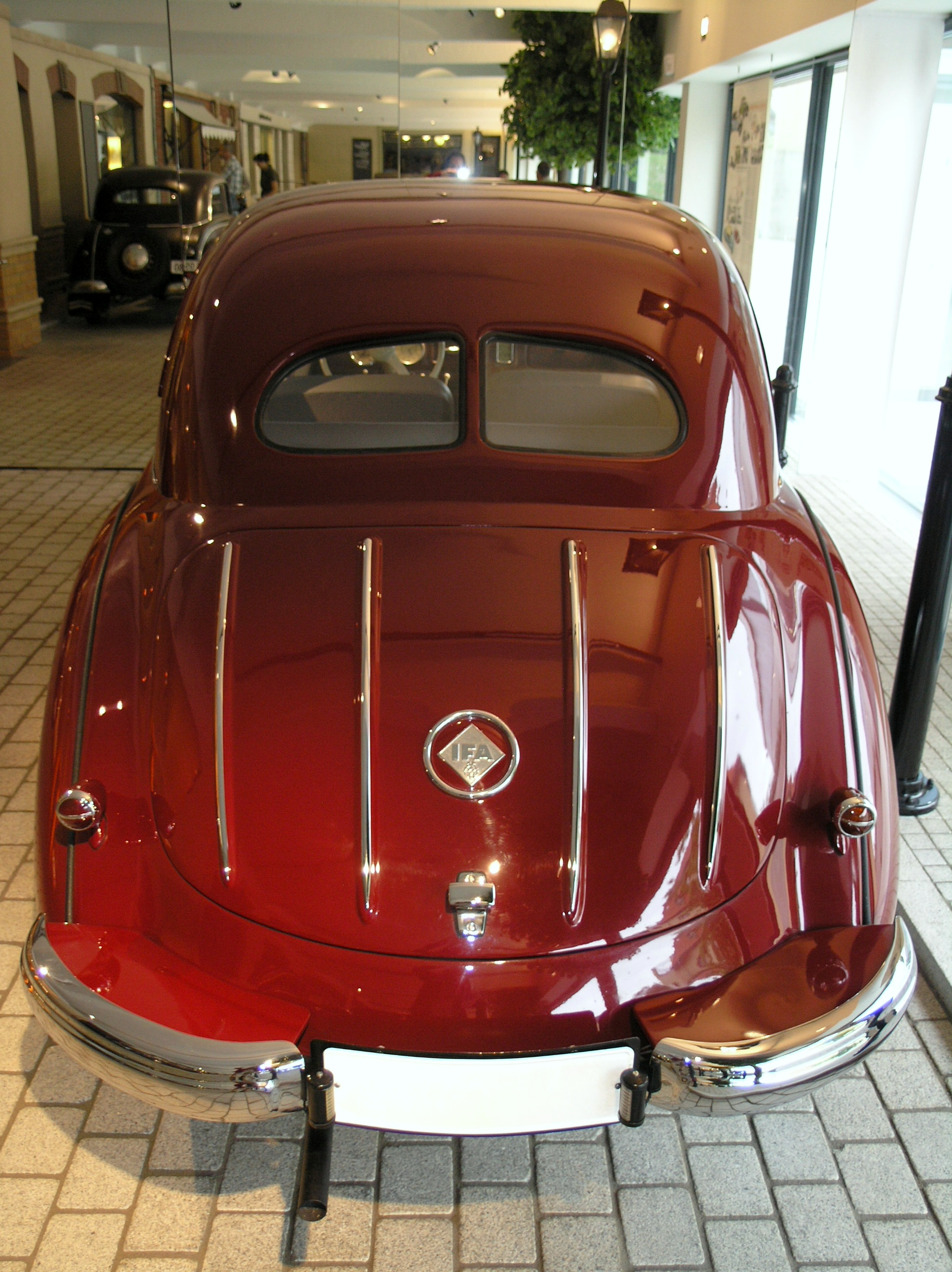
IFA F9 rear

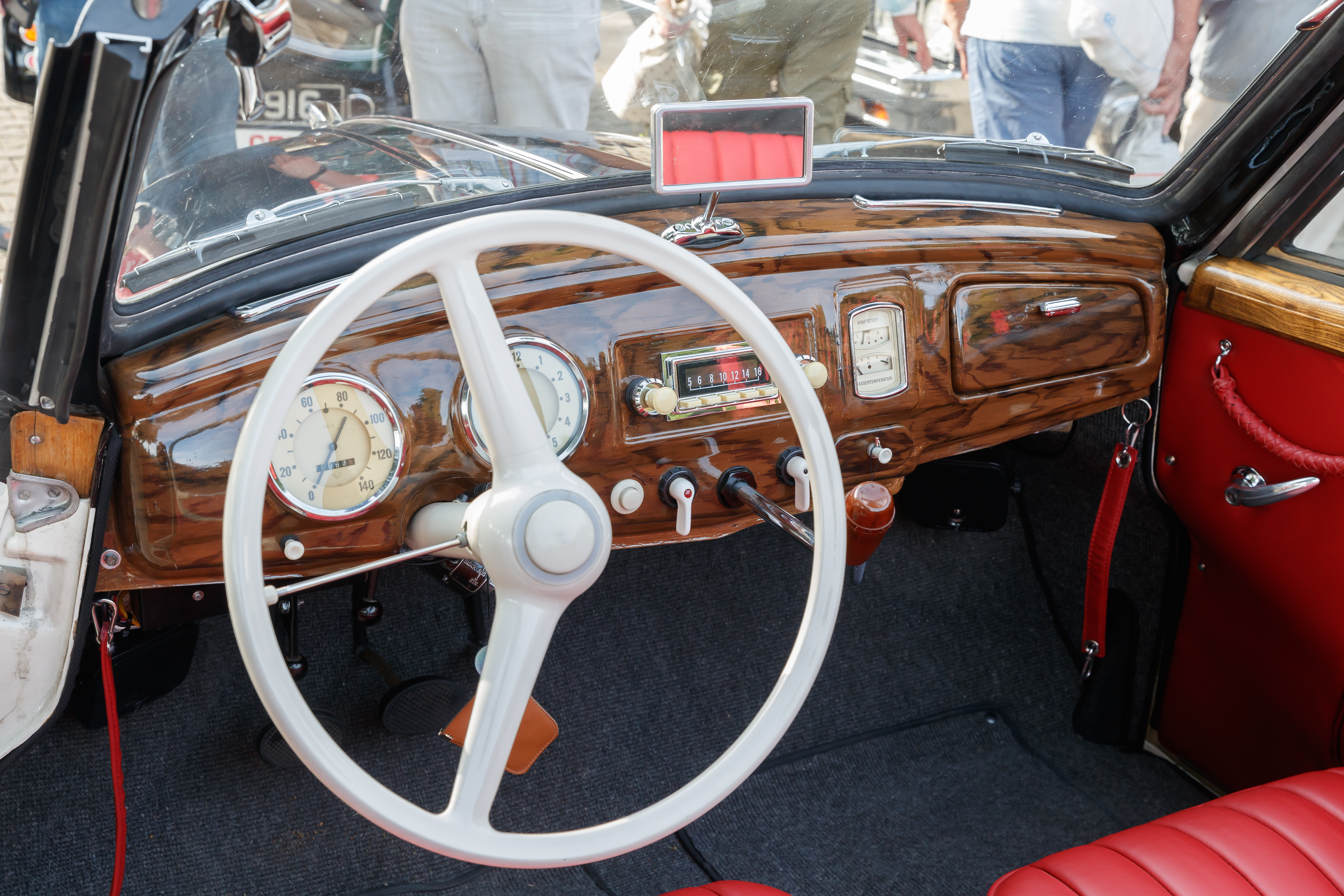
IFA F9 cabriolet interior

Surviving F9s appear largely restricted to saloon versions, but various sports and cabriolet versions were also produced. Steel for consumer industries was in short supply across many parts of Europe during this period, and the F9’s body construction increasingly involved plastic panels, especially after production was moved to Eisenach in 1953. The car was accordingly usefully lighter than its western built Auto Union equivalent.

== Technical ==
The F9 featured a three-cylinder two-stroke water-cooled engine of 910 cc with a claimed output, at launch, of 28 bhp (21 kW). The engine was water-cooled, the radiator being located behind the engine, an unusual configuration but one also found on the DKW F91. The front wheels were driven via a four-speed manual gear box with a free wheel.
