= DKW F7 =

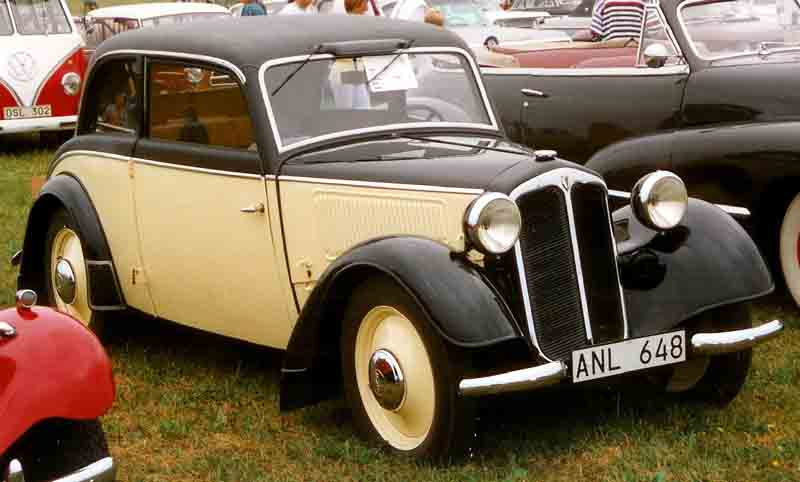
- DKW F7 saloon

Overview
- Manufacturer: Auto Union AG
- Also called: Reichsklasse; Meisterklasse
- Production: 1937–1938
- Assembly: Germany: Zwickau

Body and chassis
- Class: Subcompact family car (C)
- Body style: 2-door saloon 2-door cabriolet saloon 2-door coupe cabriolet coupe utility van
- Layout: FF layout
- Related: Toyota EA

Powertrain
- Engine: 584 cc & 692 cc two stroke I2
- Transmission: 3-speed manual

Dimensions
- Wheelbase: 2,610 mm (103 in)
- Length: 3,985 mm (156.9 in)
- Width: 1,480 mm (58 in)
- Height: 1,500 mm (59 in)
- Curb weight: 750 kg (1,650 lb) approx

Chronology
- Predecessor: DKW F5
- Successor: DKW F8

The DKW F7 is a front-wheel-drive, two-stroke, subcompact family car produced by Auto Union’s DKW division from 1937 to 1938, succeeding their DKW F5 range. In the F7 update, the slightly smaller entry-level 'Reichsklasse' body was dropped – instead all F7s, including the base trim, now got the slightly longer body previously reserved for the 'Meisterklasse' model.

Some 80,000 of these front-wheel drives were sold until the 1939 DKW F8 successor was released.

== The body ==
The entry level 'Reichsklasse' saloon now shared the hitherto slightly longer body of the 'Meisterklasse' saloon. Otherwise, changes between the F5 and the F7 were mostly at a detail level.

From launch, a 2-door saloon and a 2-door cabriolet saloon, with fixed sides, were offered. In 1938 a full cabriolet 2‑door, the 'Front Luxus Cabriolet', was added to the range.

== Engine and running gear ==
The car has the two cylinder two-stroke engine of its predecessor. The Reichsklasse engine was of 584 cc with an output of 18 bhp (13 kW). The Meisterklasse’s 692 cc engine had an output of 20 bhp (15 kW). Respective claimed top speeds were 80 km/h (50 mph) and 85 km/h (53 mph).

Like all the small DKWs of the 1930s, the F7 had front-wheel drive, which in its era was still very innovative, but in subsequent decades would become the default drive layout in the majority of cars around the world.

== Commercial ==
The popular F7 was replaced by the DKW F8 in 1939. By this time, approximately 80,000 F7s had been built.

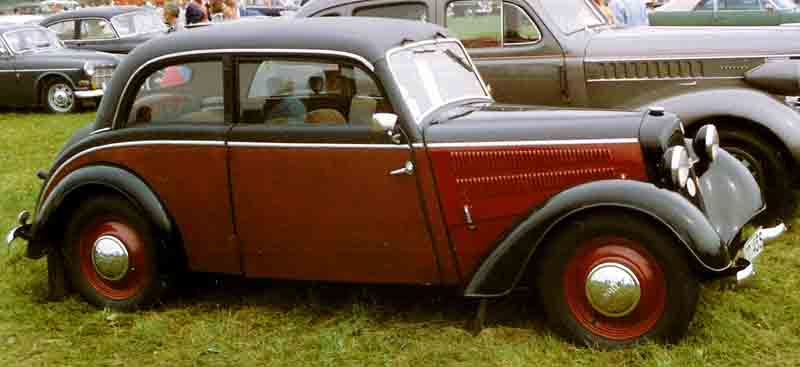
DMW F7 saloon

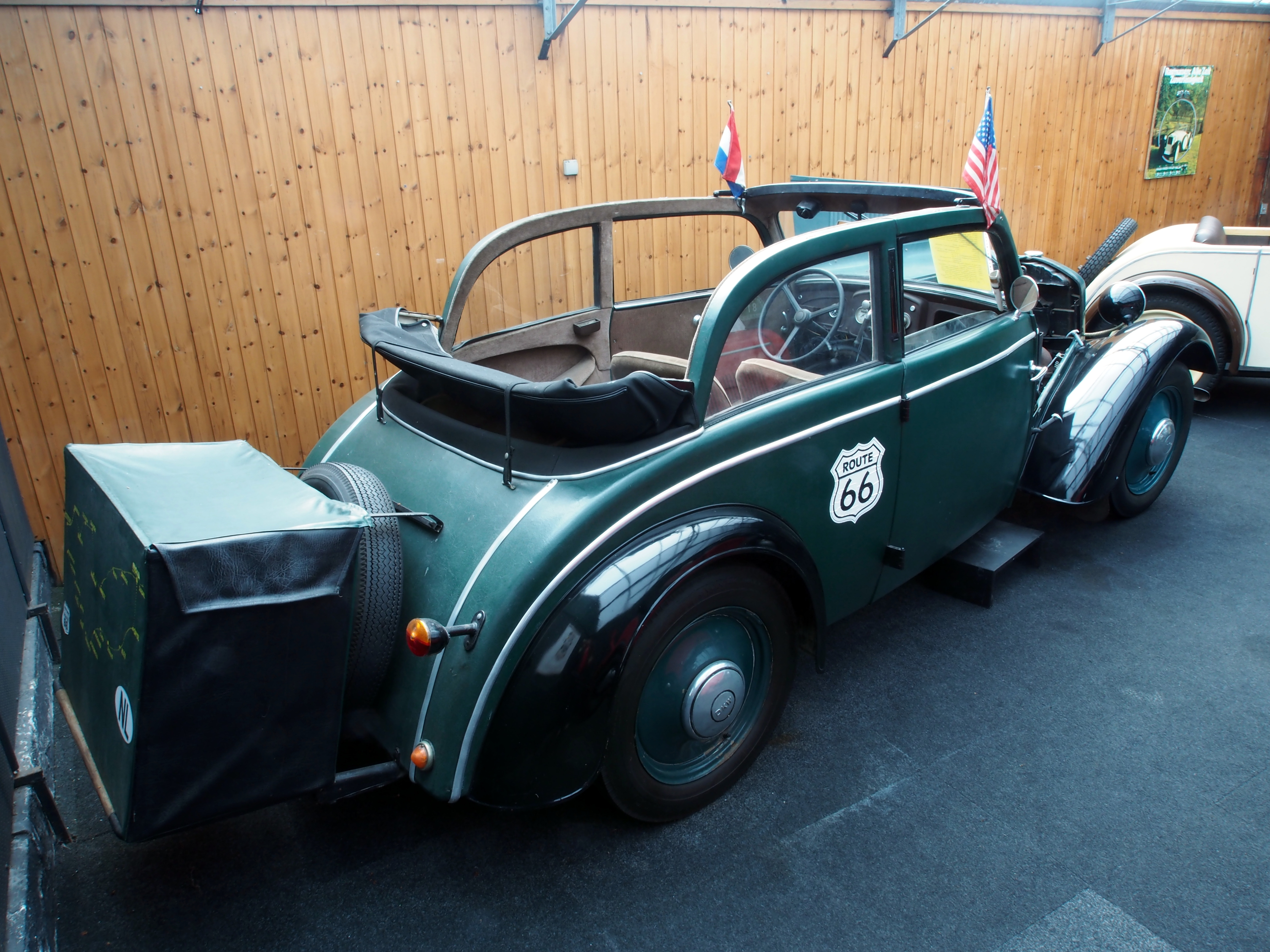
DKW F7 cabriolet saloon

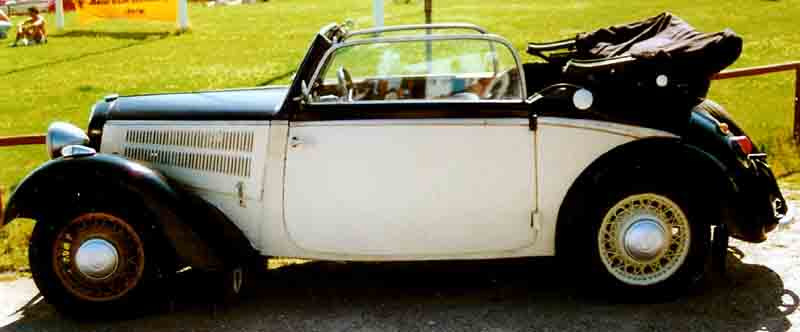
The DKW F7 Front Luxus Cabriolet, introduced in 1938, shared the 692 cc engine of the Meisterklasse.

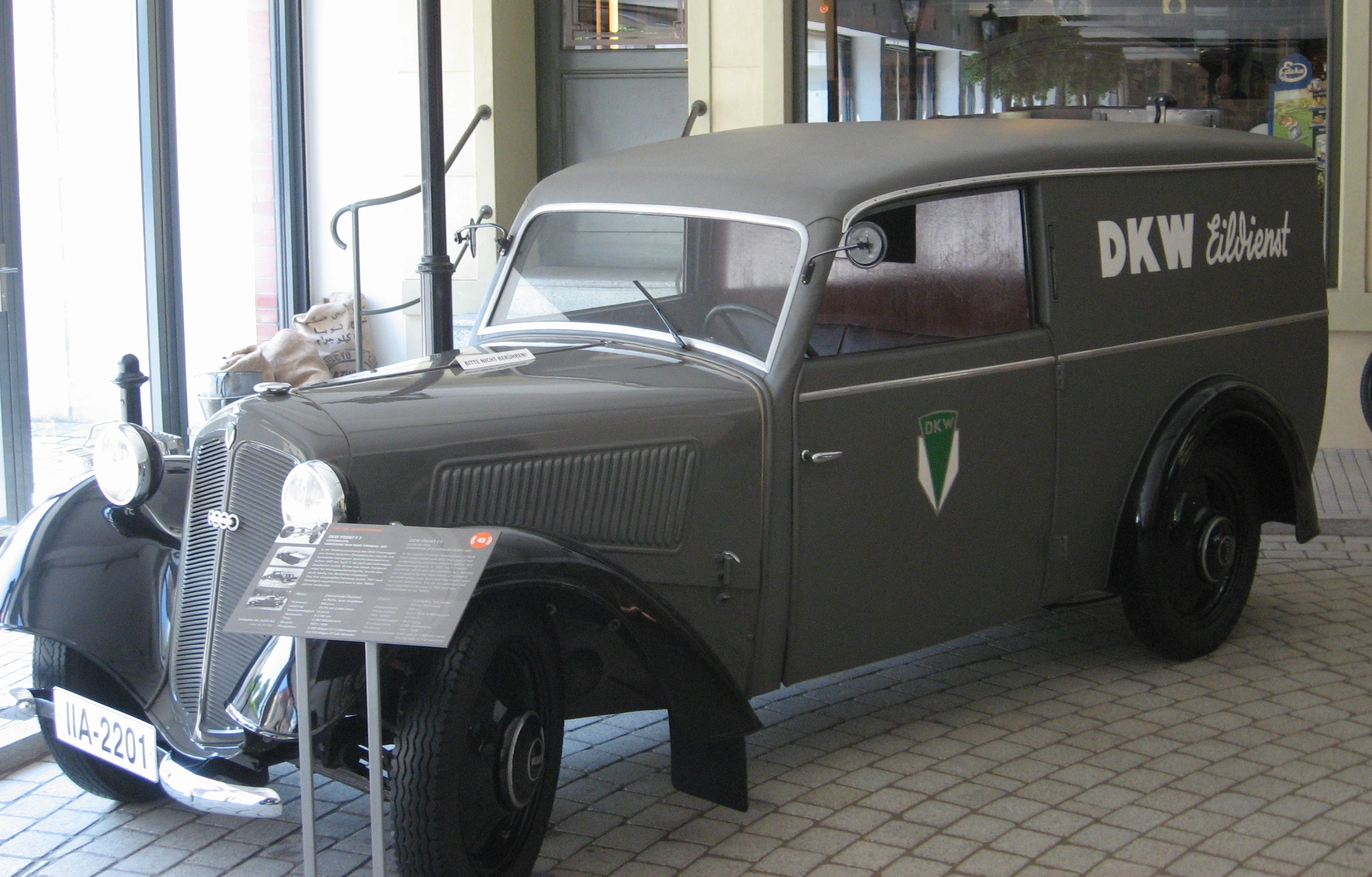
DKW F7 van
