= Allgaier =

Allgaier is a surname. Notable people with the surname include:

- Justin Allgaier (born 1986), American stock car racer
- Johann Baptist Allgaier (1763–1823), Austrian chess master

== See also ==
- Allgaier (company)
