= DKW F8 =

DKW F8 IFA F8
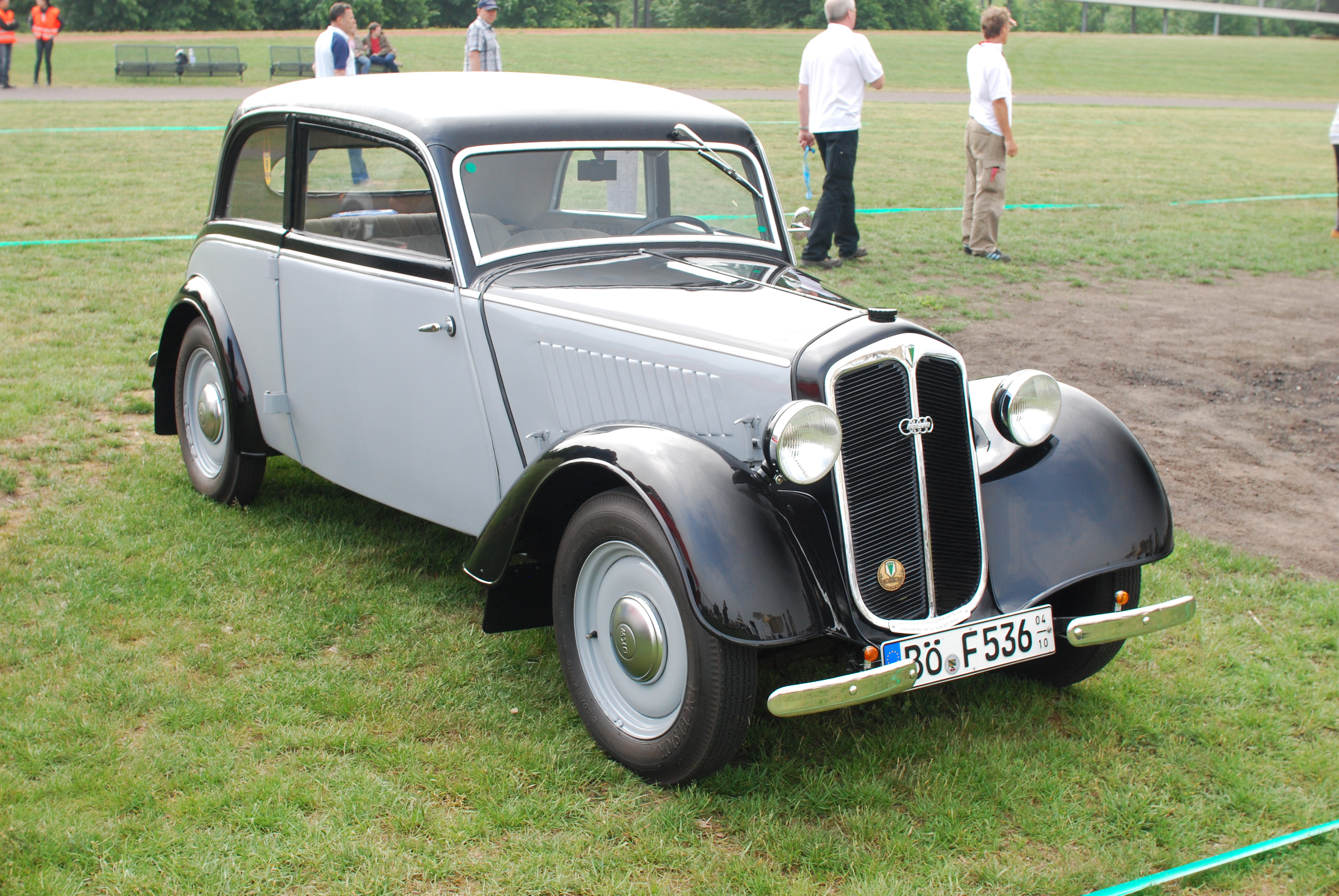

Overview
- Manufacturer: Auto Union AG; Industrieverband Fahrzeugbau
- Also called: Reichsklasse; Meisterklasse
- Production: 1939–1942 (DKW); 1948–1955 (IFA)
- Assembly: Germany: Zwickau (DKW); East Germany: Zwickau (IFA)

Body and chassis
- Class: Small family car (C)
- Body style: 2-door saloon; 2-door cabriolet; 2-door sedan delivery; 2-door station wagon (IFA); 2-door flatbed truck (IFA)
- Layout: FF layout

Powertrain
- Engine: 589 / 692 cc two stroke I2
- Transmission: 3-speed manual

Dimensions
- Wheelbase: 2,600 mm (102.4 in)
- Length: 3,900–4,000 mm (154–157 in)
- Curb weight: 700–900 kg (1,543–1,984 lb)

Chronology
- Predecessor: DKW F7
- Successor: DKW F89; IFA F9

The DKW F8 is a compact front-wheel drive two-stroke engined saloon, introduced in 1939. The F8 was slightly shorter than its predecessor despite having a marginally increased wheelbase. The base model, known as the Reichsklasse ("National Class"), was manufactured only until 1940, but the Meisterklasse sedan continued in production until 1942. In addition to the saloons, cabriolet versions were offered.

The "F" in the car's name stood for "Front" which referred to its front wheel drive configuration. Although in retrospect it is almost always identified as the "F8" which distinguishes it from the "F7" which preceded it and from the "F9" which was intended to replace it, the manufacturer's publicity material from 1939 calls it simply the "DKW Front".

After the war the car reappeared in 1949 as the IFA F8, from the Zwickau plant which now operated under Soviet control. The factory and operation was reorganized as a Volkseigener Betrieb (or "People Owned Enterprise") Automobilwerke Zwickau (AWZ). The F8 continued in production at Zwickau until approximately 1955: in addition to the sedan and cabriolet bodies, various additional body types available post war included a panel van and an estate variant.

== Engine options ==
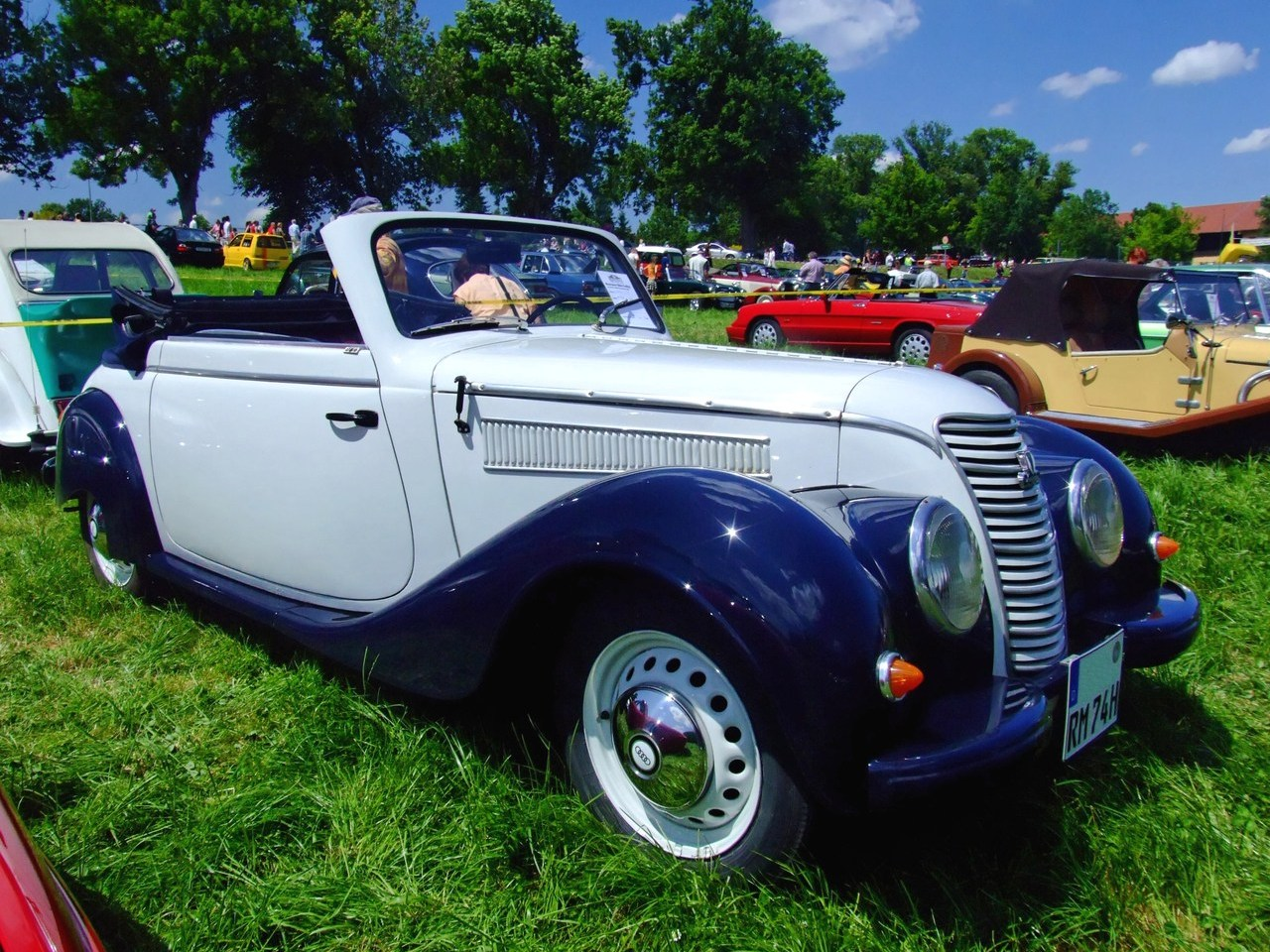
1940 DKW F8 Luxus-Cabriolet

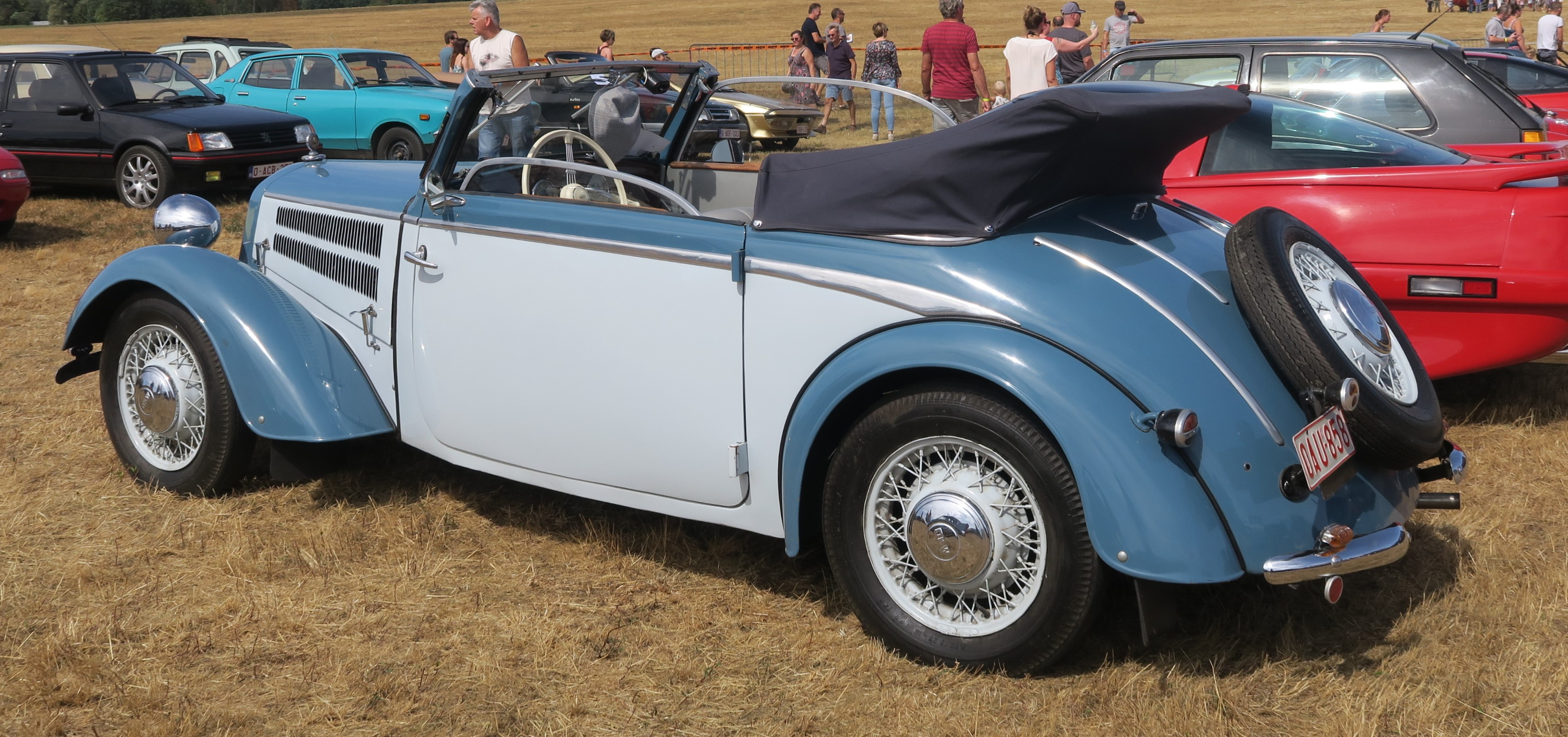
DKW F8 Cabriolet viewed from behind

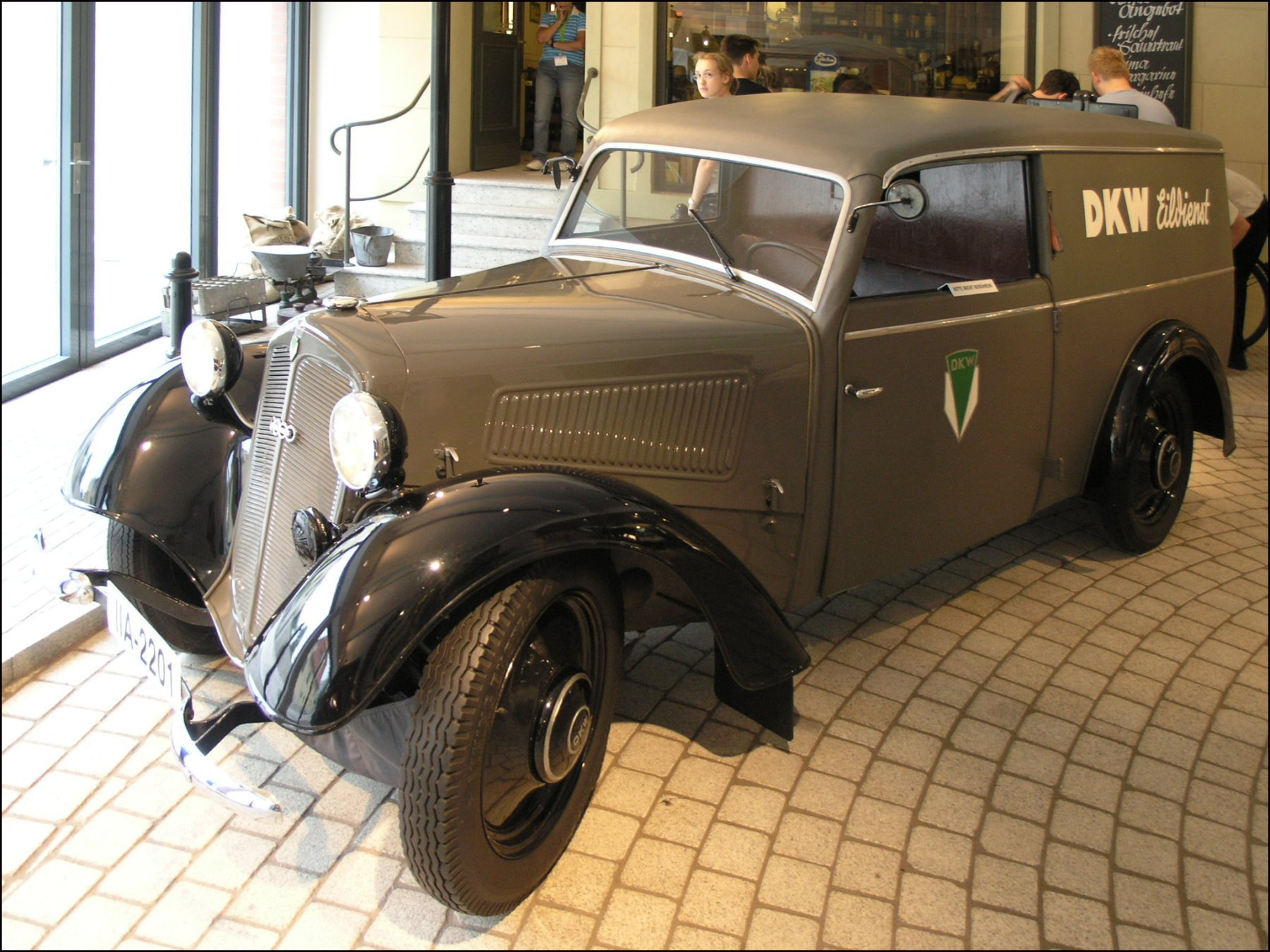
DKW F8 Kastenwagen, a sedan delivery variant.

The base Reichsklasse model kept the two-stroke twin-cylinder engine from its predecessor, but fractionally bored out. Engine capacity was now 589 cc. Claimed output and top speed were as before at 18 PS (13.2 kW) and 80 km/h (50 mph).

The ‘Meisterklasse’’ version of the DKW F8 also inherited its predecessor's similarly configured engine of 692 cc. For this engine 20 PS (14.7 kW) was claimed, with a top speed of 85 km/h (53 mph). It was this larger engine that reappeared in the IFA F8 in 1949 (although IFA calculated the displacement to be 690 cc); the F8 had the same claimed top speed.

Power was delivered to the front wheels by means of a three-speed manual gear box with a lockable freewheel mechanism on all three ratios. The engine was started using a Dynastart device, which was a combination starter motor / generator.

== Body ==
The body was mounted on a box frame chassis which facilitated the fitting of different body options, such as the light vans and trucks produced during the IFA period. The outer skin of the car comprised a combination of steel panels and, for the central portion, fabric covered timber frame bodywork. After 1953 key panels were made from duroplast, reducing the weight of the car and anticipating the light weight technologies that would be applied to Trabant construction.

The Swiss coachbuilding firm of Holka produced their own bodies for the imported F8 chassis. Importations of F8 chassis began in 1939, and continued till 1944 (despite production having ceased in 1942) in small numbers. In 1944, Holka even designed and produced (in very small quantities) their own version of a cabriolet, formerly imported. The final Holka-bodied car was finished in January 1945.

== Model life ==
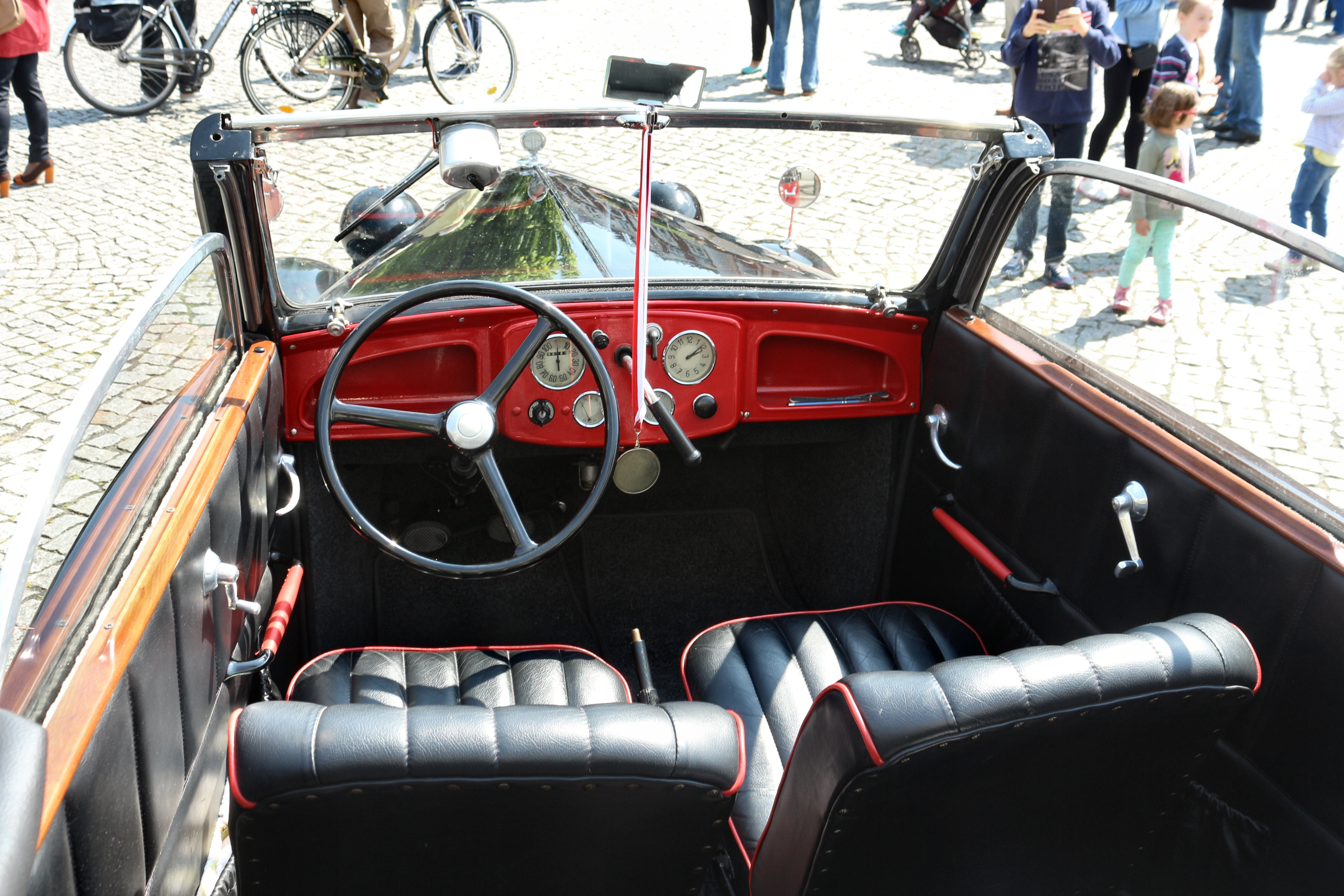
DKW F8 Cabriolet, interior

The F8 had replaced the DKW F7 after only a two-year model life. The small DKWs were among the best selling small cars in Germany during the 1930s, and regular model replacement was part of Auto Union's successful marketing strategy. It seems that the F8 was itself scheduled for relatively rapid replacement by the steel bodied DKW F9. War intervened, however, and production of the Reichsklasse and Cabriolet was ended in 1940. Production of the Meisterklasse continued until 1942. By 1942, when passenger car production at Zwickau was ended, approximately 50,000 F8s had been produced. Sales of new F8 cars and chassis continued until 1944, and the Swiss coachbuilding firm of Holka was still bodying new F8 chassis during 1943 and 1944. That firm even introduced a new cabriolet in 1944, though only a small number were produced. Directly after the war it took some time for DKW production to resume, but prewar F8s did soon appear on German roads: the car had been a big seller before the war and military personnel during the first half of the 1940s had found the modest dimensions and performance of the F8 relatively unappealing, often allowing them to escape military requisition.

At the 1947 Leipzig Fair the car reappeared, badged now as the DKW-IFA F8. Production of the eastern IFA F8 (without DKW badges) recommenced in or before 1949 at the Auto Union's Zwickau factory which was in the Soviet occupied zone of Germany and was expropriated to become the VEB Automobilwerke Zwickau (AWZ).

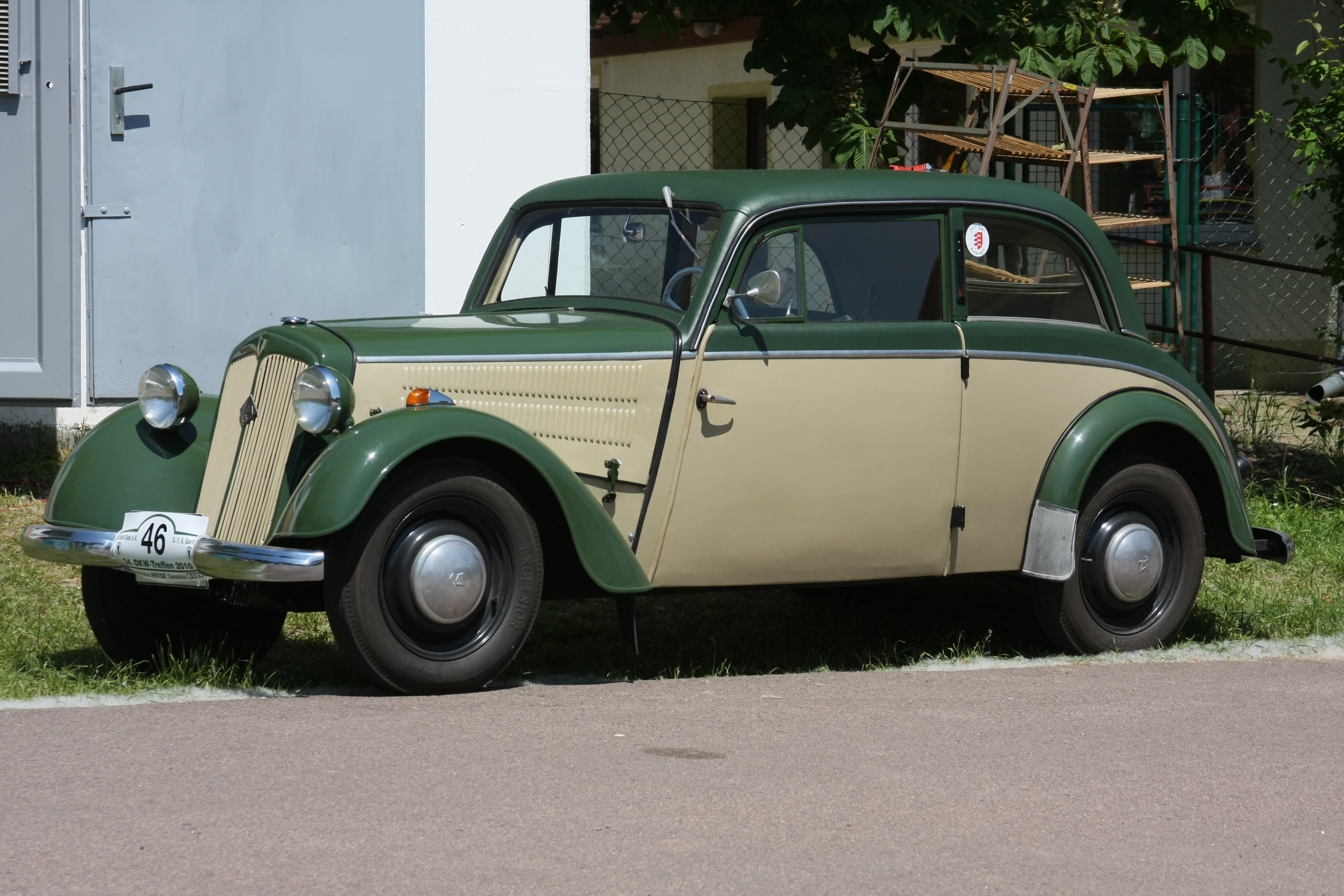
IFA F8 two-door saloon

It is believed that by 1955 a further 26,267 of the cars had been built as IFA F8s. Under an "inter-zone" trade agreement concluded in 1950/51 approximately 1,000 of the cars were exported to what had by now de facto become the separate country of West Germany. A wider range of body options included an estate and light commercial variants. In 1953, a Luxus-Cabriolet with special streamlined bodywork by VEB Karosseriewerk Dresden (Gläser) was introduced, intended primarily as an export special for the western market.

After the IFA brand had been phased out, the final F8s were evidently badged as Wartburgs. A handful of Luxus-Cabriolets were completed in 1956 and 1957, while replacement bodies for F8 Kombis continued to be manufactured until 1964. East German media commented on the outmoded and labour-intensive construction of the F8 Kombi in 1964, noting that the body took twice as long to build as that of one of the new Trabant estates. The two-cylinder 700 cc two-stroke engine lived on in the iconic Trabant.

== Technical date ==
Technical data DKW F8 Reichsklasse / Meisterklasse (Manufacturer's figures except where stated)
DKW / IFA F8	DKW F8 Reichsklasse 2-door saloon 2-door cabriolet	DKW F8 Meisterklasse 2-door saloon 2-door cabriolet	DKW F8 Front Luxus Cabriolet 2-door sports body cabriolet	IFA F8 2-door saloon 2-door cabriolet	IFA F8 cabriolet 2-door sports body cabriolet	IFA F8 Commercial Delivery Van
Produced:	1939–1940	1939–1942	1939–1940	1948–1955	1949–1955	-
Engine:	2-cylinder in-line engine (two-stroke), front-mounted					
Bore x Stroke:	74 mm x 68.5 mm	76 mm x 76 mm				
Displacement:	589 cc	692 cc		690 cc		
Max. Power @ rpm:	18 PS (13.2 kW) at 3500	20 PS (14.7 kW) at 3500				
Max. Torque @ rpm:	-	-	-	49 N⋅m (36 lb⋅ft) at 2500		
Fuel feed:	single carburetor			single carburetor "VEB Berliner-Vergaser-Filterwerke"		
Fuel Mixture:	Petrol/gasoline:oil 25:1					
Cooling:	Water Thermosiphonkühlung (gravity-powered water pump)					
Gearbox:	3-speed-manual with lockable freewheel device: facia mounted gear lever & front-wheel drive.					
Electrical system:	6 volt					
Front suspension:	-					
Rear suspension::	-					
Brakes:	4-wheel drum					
Steering:						
Body structure:	Box-frame chassis Bodywork: combination of fabric covered steel frame and steel panels					
Dry weight:	700 kg (1,543 lb)	750 kg (1,653 lb)	790–830 kg (1,742–1,830 lb)	750 kg (1,653 lb)	780 kg (1,720 lb)	900 kg (2,000 lb)
Track front/rear:	1,190 mm (46.9 in) / 1,250 mm (49.2 in)					
Wheelbase:	2,600 mm (102.4 in)					
Length:	3,900 mm (153.5 in)	3,990 mm (157.1 in)	4,000 mm (157.5 in)	3,900 mm (150 in)	4,000 mm (157.5 in)	3,900 mm (153.5 in)
Width:	1,490 mm (58.7 in)			1,480 mm (58.3 in)		
Height:	1,480 mm (58.3 in)	1,480 mm (58.3 in)	1,480 mm (58.3 in)	1,480 mm (58.3 in)	1,480 mm (58.3 in)	1,480 mm (58.3 in)
Turning circle:	12.0 m (39 ft 4.4 in)			-	-	-
