= DKW F9 =

Prototype of a car

The DKW F9 was the prototype of a car Auto Union intended to launch as a successor to the DKW F8.

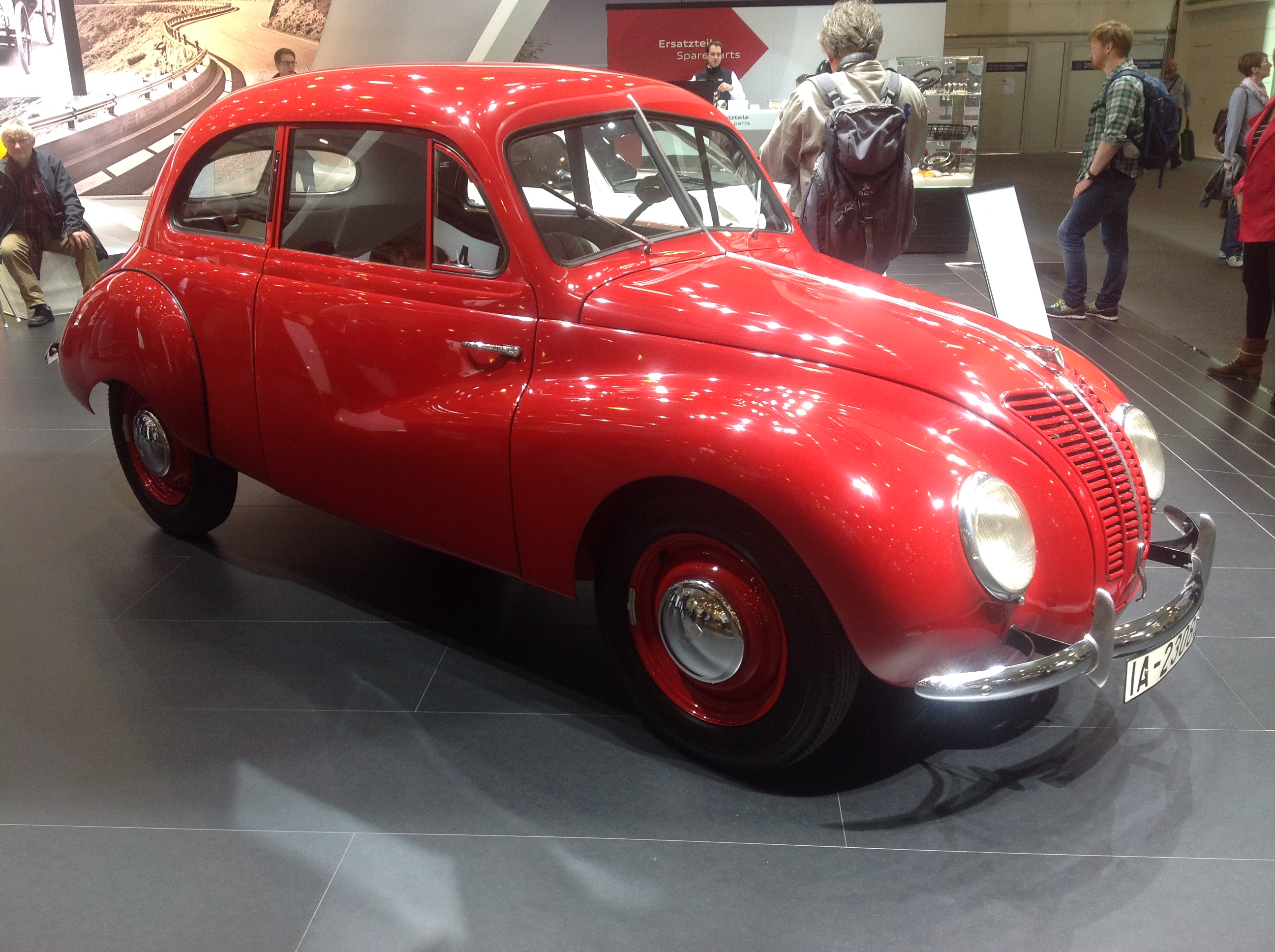
DKW F9 prototype

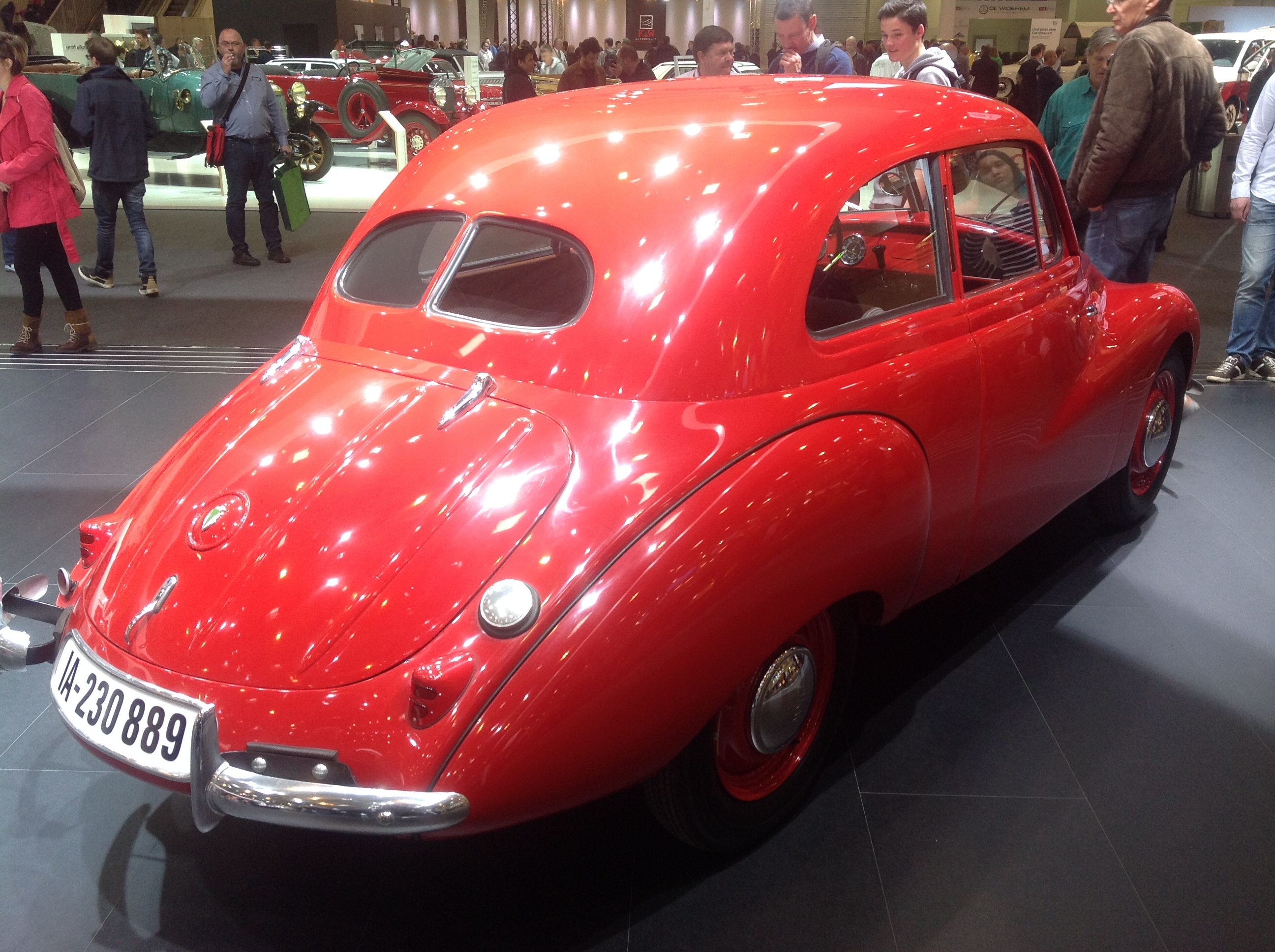
rear view

The small DKWs were among top selling small cars in Germany in the 1930s, and regular model updates were part of the company's strategy for maintaining commercial success in this growing market sector. With its all steel body designed by Guenther Mickwausch the F9 would have represented a significantly greater step forward than the F8 had done: it appears that the F9 was already under development in 1937, two years before launch of its F8 predecessor. Several prototypes were built during the 1939–1942 period.

A Cd factor of 0.42 was claimed for the new design and the look of the car was significantly smoother than the 1930s DKW designs. For the first time, a three cylinder engine was specified, implying useful performance advantages. In other respects, DKW traditions were respected. The engine was still a two stroke unit, and the driven wheels were still the front wheels. The chassis was still of box frame construction.

Had the war not intervened it is believed that the F9 would have replaced the F8 in 1940. In the event, production of the F8 Meisterklasse was prolonged until 1942 when passenger car production at Zwickau came to an end.

However, after the war the car reappeared as the IFA F9 and was offered for sale by the Zwickau plant's new controllers between 1949 and 1956. In the west of Germany Auto Union's successor company started off with two cylinder products that in many ways owed more to the old F8 than to the F9, but with the introduction in 1953 of the DKW F91 the western business, too, offered its own development of this innovative pre-war prototype.
