= Wanderer W21 =

Wanderer W21 (1933-1934) Wanderer W235 (1935) Wanderer W35 (1936)
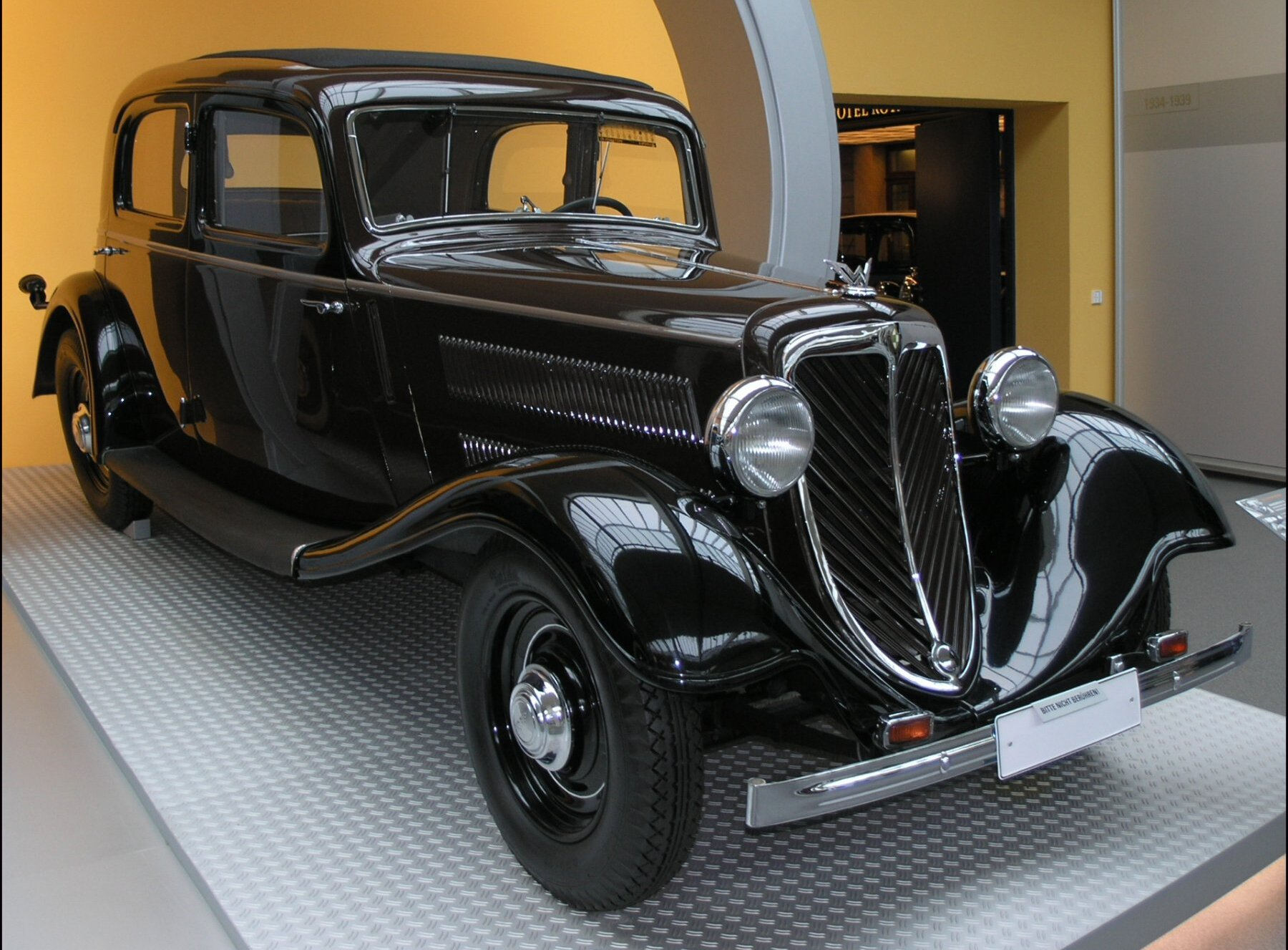

Overview
- Manufacturer: Wanderer-Werke AG
- Production: 1933 – 1936
- Assembly: Zwickau, Germany

Body and chassis
- Related: Wanderer W22

Powertrain
- Engine: 1,690 cc ohv Straight six
- Transmission: 4-speed manual with floor-mounted shift

Dimensions
- Wheelbase: 3,000 mm (120 in)
- Length: 4,500 mm (180 in)
- Width: 1,670 mm (66 in)
- Height: 1,650 mm (65 in)

Chronology
- Predecessor: Wanderer W17

The Wanderer W21 was a middle-class six-cylinder sedan introduced by Auto Union's Wanderer company in 1933. The W21 replaced the Wanderer W17, from which it inherited its ohv engine. The car shared its chassis with the more powerful Wanderer W22, but its engine was smaller.

Two years after introduction, in 1935, the car was renamed as the Wanderer W235, and in 1936 it was renamed again as the Wanderer W35. The engine and principal mechanical components remained very little changed throughout, however, as did the wheelbase and other principal chassis measurements. The car therefore was, and generally still is, regarded as a single model despite the name changes.

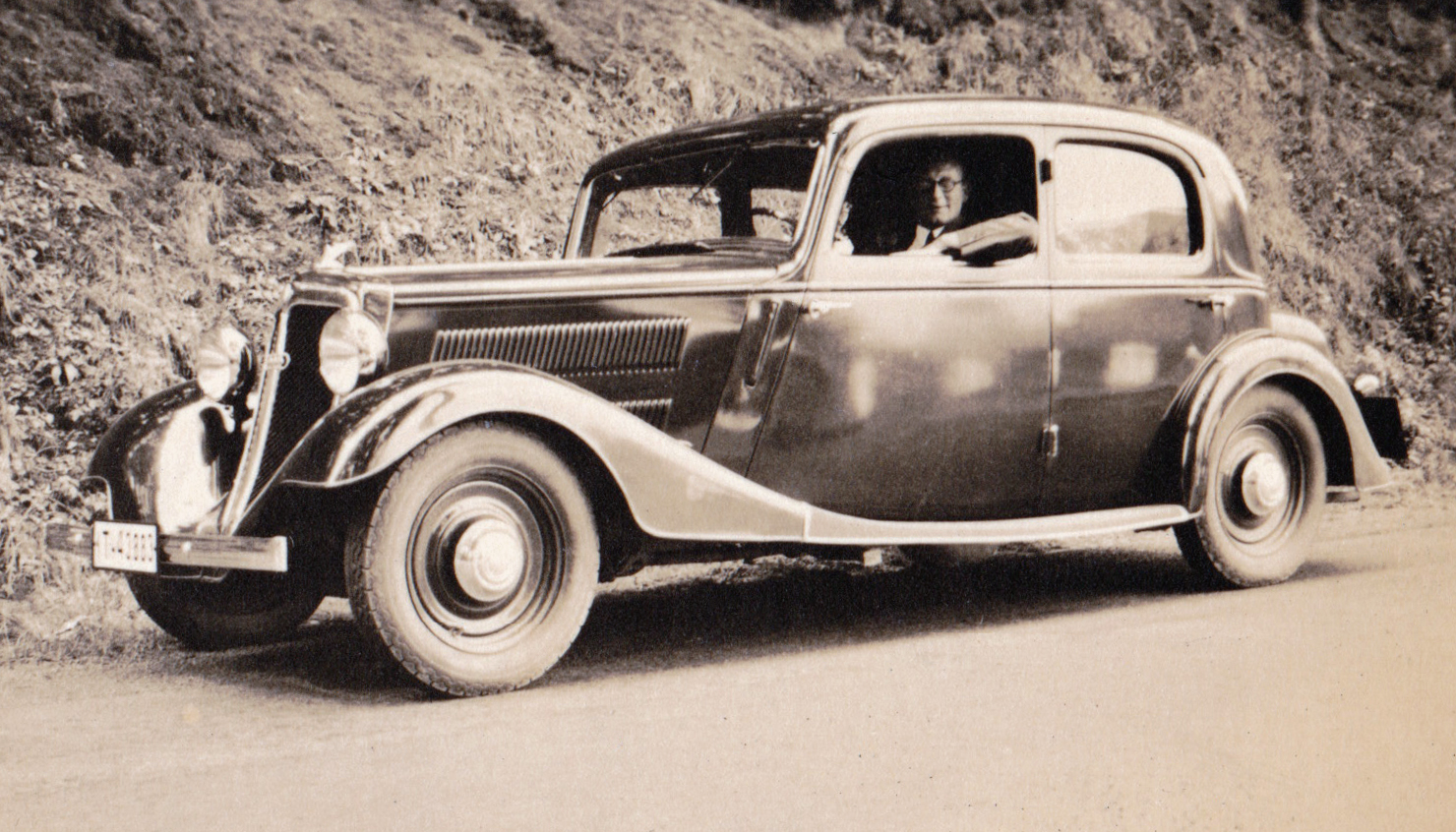
1934 Wanderer W21

At launch the W21 differed from its predecessor most notably on account of its subframe and swing rear axle, supported by lateral leaf springing, adopting a pattern established by Professor Porsche during his time with the (at that time still independent) Austrian Steyr company. Another new feature in the W21 was the hydraulic braking system.

The car was powered by a six-cylinder four-stroke ohv engine of 1690 cc driving the rear wheels via a four-speed gear box. Claimed maximum power output was 35 PS (26 kW; 35 hp), supporting a top speed of 95 km/h (59 mph).

Initially the compact-six-engined Wanderer was offered as a four-door saloon and as a two-door cabriolet. The 1935 name change from W21 to W235 coincided with the withdrawal of the cabriolet version and the introduction of a four-door ‘tourer’. There were no significant changes to the car accompanying the 1936 name change to Wanderer W35.

The Wanderer W21/W235/W35 shared its 3,000 mm (118.1 in) wheelbase both with the six-cylinder 1950 cc W22/W240/W40 and, after 1935, with the six-cylinder 2257 cc W245/W250/W45/W50 models. Taking all the 3 meter wheelbase models together, 29,111 of these six-cylinder Wanderers were produced between 1933 and 1938.

Arguably Auto Union did not directly replace the Wanderer W35. However, the four-cylinder Wanderer W24 with its 42 PS (31 kW) engine was probably seen by some to be occupying the same middle market sector.
