= Audi Type P =

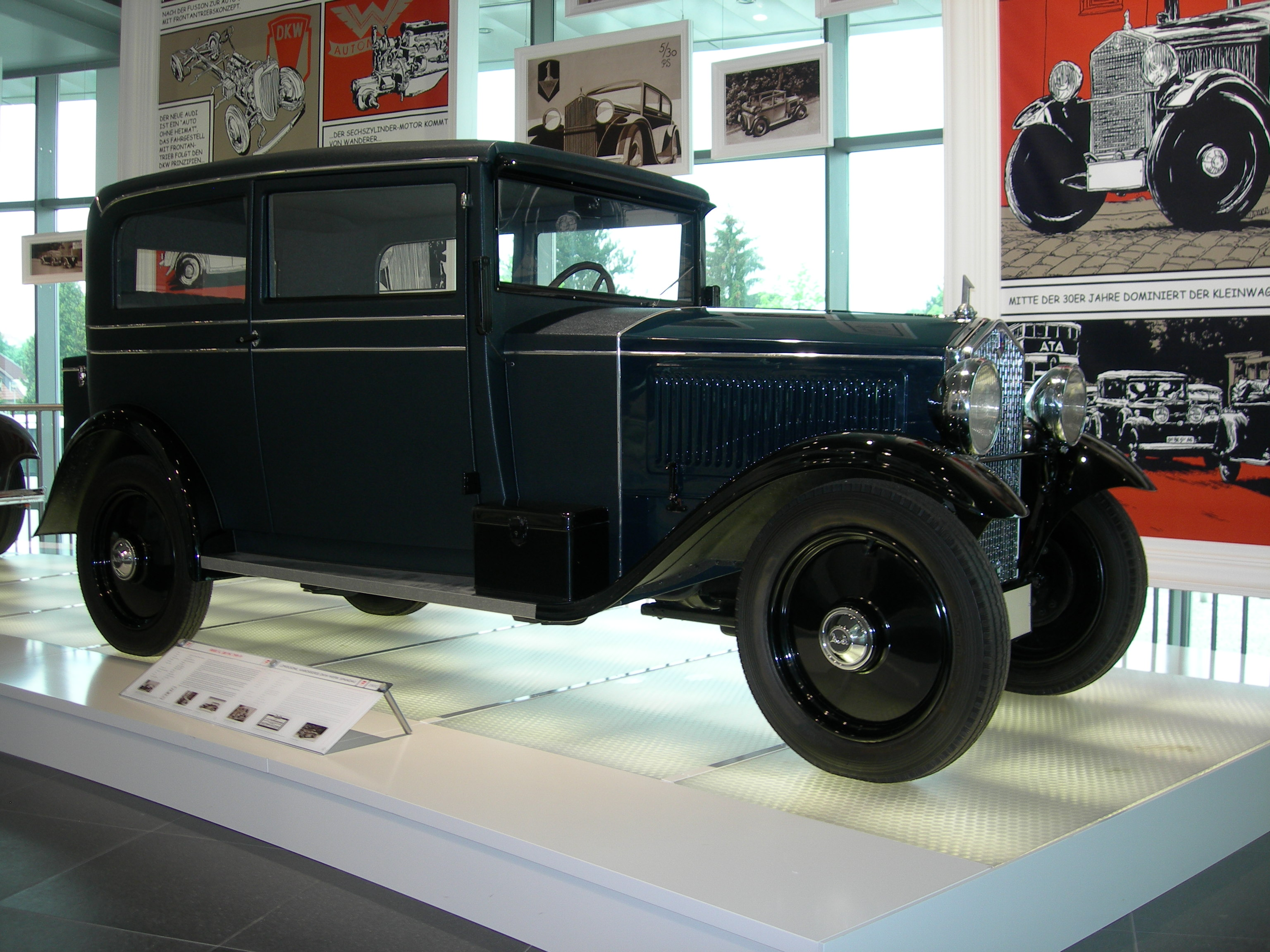

Overview
- Manufacturer: Audi-Werke
- Also called: Audi 5 / 30
- Production: 1931–1932
- Assembly: Spandau, Germany

Body and chassis
- Layout: FR layout

Powertrain
- Engine: 1,122 cc 4-stroke I4 (from Peugeot 201)

Dimensions
- Wheelbase: 2,700 mm (110 in)
- Length: 3,680 mm (145 in)
- Width: 1,400 mm (55 in)
- Height: 1,650 mm (65 in)
- Kerb weight: 825 kg (1,819 lb)

The Audi Type P was a small two-door sedan/saloon car introduced by Audi in 1931. It was discontinued by 1932.

== History ==
Jørgen Skafte Rasmussen who had purchased Audiwerke AG in 1928 was concerned that the Audi Zwickau plant was badly underutilized because demand for the expensive luxury cars that Audi produced was still restricted by the economic contraction that had followed the 1929 Stock-market crashes. The other company owned by Rasmussen was Zschopauer Motorenwerke with its brand DKW, which had in 1929 introduced the small rear-wheel drive DKW Typ 4=8. Zschopauer Motorenwerke was the nation's largest producer of motor-bikes, and used a motor-bike style two-stroke engine in their own small cars. Rasmussen became persuaded that the then noisy and lumpy two-stroke engines might be deterring customers: his short-term solution was the Audi Type P which combined the body of the DKW Typ 4=8 with a four-stroke 1,122 cc engine. Rasmussen avoided time as well as development and tooling costs for creating a new small four-stroke units from scratch by buying engines for the Type P from Peugeot, across the Rhine in France. The Audi Type P therefore combined the body of a DKW 4=8 with engine of a Peugeot 201.

The vehicle's four-cylinder in-line side-valve engine front mounted Peugeot engine developed a maximum output of 30 PS (22 kW) at 3,200 rpm. Power was delivered to the rear wheels through a three-speed manual transmission. The car had two rigid axles with transverse leaf springs. Claimed top speed was 80 km/h (50 mph). The footbrake operated on all four wheels via a hydraulic control mechanism.

The Type P was available only as a two-door sedan with four windows. It was priced in 1931 at 3,385 Marks.

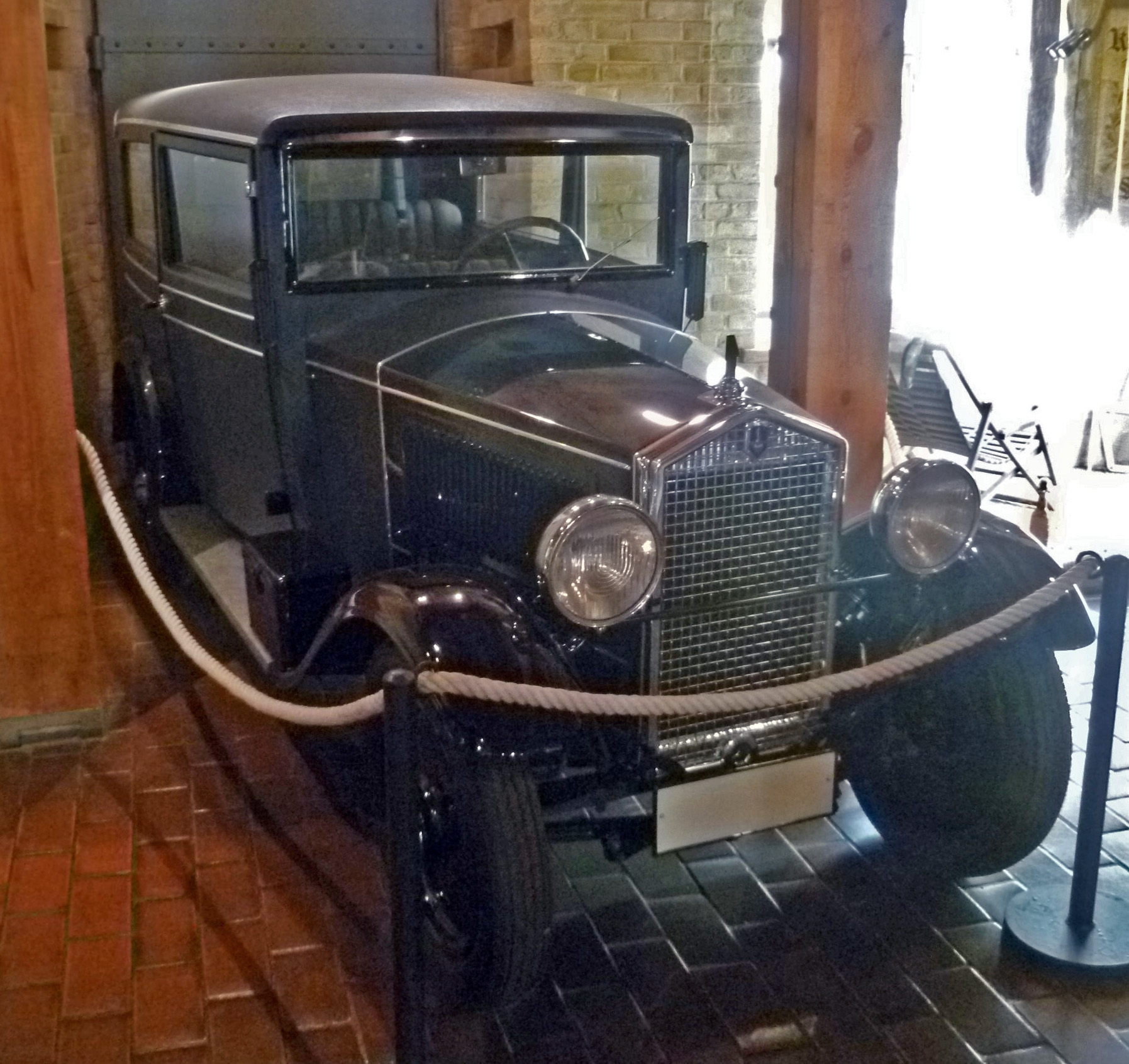
Audi P 5/30 in Spandau

Rasmussen seems to have hedged his bets when deciding how to use the spare capacity of his Spandau plant. At about the same time as he arranged to produce the new Peugeot-powered Audi Type P there, he also gave instructions for the development of a new front-wheel drive car to be derived from the company's innovative DKW Typ P. The result was the DKW F1, developed and to be produced at Zwickau, priced at approximately 2,000 Marks, and first seen in public in February 1931 at the Berlin Motor Show. The only slightly cheaper 782/990 cc two-stroke DKW found approximately 4,000 buyers between 1931 and 1932: in the same period fewer than 400 of the four-stroke 1,122 cc Audi Type Ps were produced. Audi themselves gives the precise number of Audi Type Ps as 327. The Audi Type P was not directly replaced: after 1932 Audi retreated from their brief excursion into compact cars, restricting themselves for the rest of the decade to large six-cylinder engined automobiles. Meanwhile the DKW F1 and its successors, introduced to fill unused capacity in what had been the Audi Zwickau plant, proved so popular that for the rest of the 1930s Audi's own cars had to be produced at Auto Union's nearby Horch plant.

== Specifications ==
| Production | 1931-1932 |
| Engine | 4 Cylinder, 4 Stroke |
| Bore x Stroke | 63 mm (2.5 in) x 90 mm (3.5 in) |
| Capacity | 1,122 cc |
| Power | 30 PS (22 kW) |
| Top Speed | 80 km/h (50 mph) |
| Empty Weight | 750 kg (1,653 lb) (Chassis) |
| Electrical | 6 Volt |
| Wheelbase | 2,700 mm (106.3 in) |
| Track Front/Rear | 1,120 mm (44.1 in) / 1,170 mm (46.1 in) |

== Sources ==
- Oswald, Werner: Deutsche Autos 1920-1945, Motorbuch Verlag Stuttgart, 10. Auflage (1996), ISBN 3-87943-519-7
- Oswald, Werner (2001). Deutsche Autos 1920-1945, Band (vol) 2 (in German). Motorbuch Verlag. ISBN 3-613-02170-6.
