= W24 =

W24 may refer to:

- W24 (band), a South Korean band
- British NVC community W24, an underscrub community in the British National Vegetation Classification system
- Burduna language
- Compound of five tetrahedra
- LSWR O2 Class W24 Calbourne, a locomotive
- Mercedes-Benz W24, a German sedan
- W24 engine, an engine with twenty-four cylinders
- Wanderer W24, a German sedan
- Witt design, a block design in combinatorics
