= W40 =

W40 may refer to:

- W40 (nuclear warhead)
- Kembuchi Station, in Hokkaido, Japan
- Ngarla language
- Nissan Civilian (W40), a minibus
- Wanderer W40, a sedan
- Westerhout 40, a star-forming region
- W 40, a classification in masters athletics
- W40, a Toyota W transmission
