= DKW Typ 4=8 =

DKW 4=8 (1929–1932) DKW Sonderklasse (1932–1934) DKW Schwebeklasse (1934–1937) DKW Sonderklasse (1937–1940)
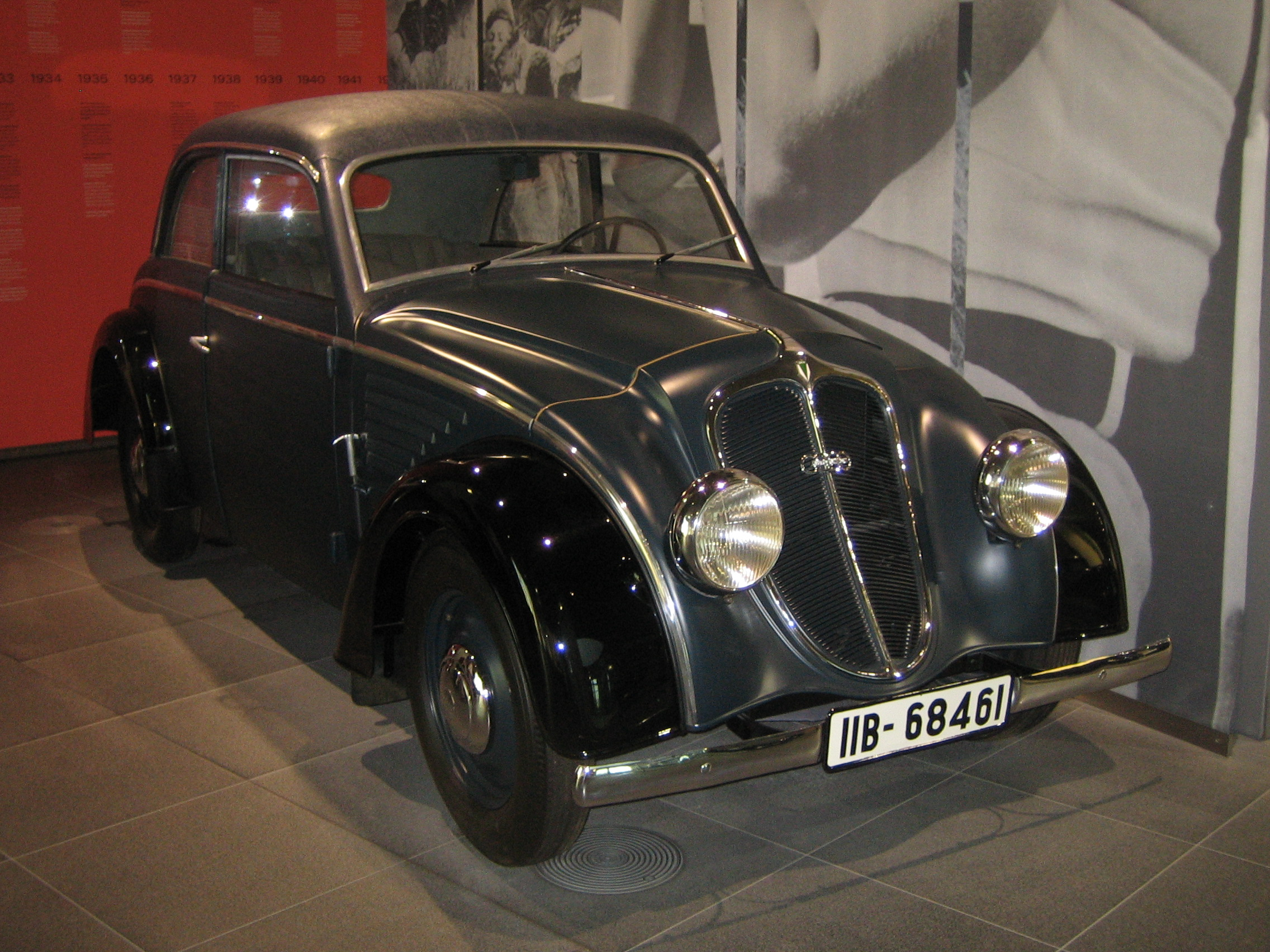
- DKW Schwebeklasse 1935–1937

Overview
- Manufacturer: DKW, later part of Auto Union
- Also called: DKW 4=8 Typ P 25 PS (1929); DKW 4=8 Typ V 800 (1930–1931) 1,698 units DKW 4=8 Typ V 1000 (1931–1932) 2,995 units DKW Sonderklasse Typ 432 (1932-1933) 966 units DKW Sonderklasse 1001/1002 (1933–1935) 6,264 units DKW Schwebeklasse (1934–1937) 6,999 units DKW Sonderklasse (1937–1940) 10,472 units
- Production: 1929–1932; Approx 3,000 units 1932–1934; Approx 7,000 units 1934–1937; Approx 6,000 1937–1940; Approx 8,000
- Assembly: Zwickau, Germany

Body and chassis
- Body style: 2 door ”limousine” (saloon); 2 door “cabrio-limousine” (soft top saloon/sedan); 2 door cabriolet
- Layout: FR layout

Powertrain
- Engine: 1929; 980 cc 4 cylinder 2-stroke 1930–1931; 762 cc 4 cylinder 2-stroke 1931–1935; 990 cc 4 cylinder 2-stroke 1935–1940; 1054 cc 4 cylinder 2-stroke
- Transmission: 1929–1932; 3-speed manual 1932; 4-speed manual 1932–1940; 4-speed manual with lockable freewheel device

Dimensions
- Wheelbase: 1929; 2,800 mm (110 in) 1930–1932; 2,700 mm (110 in)1932 2,760 mm (109 in) 1932–1937; 2,850 mm (112 in) 1937–1940; 2,600 mm (100 in)
- Length: 1929; 3,600 mm (140 in) 1930–1932; 3,680 mm (145 in) 1932; 4,000 mm (160 in) 1932–1934; 4,150 mm (163 in) 1934–1937; 4,300 mm (170 in) 1937–1940; 4,150 mm (163 in)
- Width: 1929; 1,450 mm (57 in) 1930–1932; 1,380 mm (54 in)1932 1,400 mm (55 in) 1932–1934; 1,500 mm (59 in) 1934–1937; 1,590 mm (63 in) 1937–1940; 1,600 mm (63 in)
- Height: 1929–1932; 1,630 mm (64 in) 1932; 1,650 mm (65 in) 1932–1937; 1,560 mm (61 in) 1937–1940; 1,510 mm (59 in)

The DKW Typ 4=8 is a small rear-wheel drive two-stroke V4 engined car produced at the company's Spandau plant by DKW (later part of the Auto Union). It was launched at the Berlin Motor-show in 1929 as a successor to the DKW Typ P built at the same factory, although the DKW Typ P 4=8 was significantly larger than the Typ P: in terms of market positioning a more direct successor to the DKW Type P was probably the DKW F1 produced in Zwickau from 1931.

Initially, in 1929, very few Typ 4=8s were produced, but volumes built up as the DKW Typ P and its sporting derivative was phased out, and between 1929 and 1940 approximately 24,000 Typ 4=8s were manufactured. The figure is dwarfed by the approximately 218,000 smaller DKW F1 and its successors produced at Zwickau between 1931 and 1942, and in retrospect the Typ 4=8 tends to be overlooked when compared to its front-wheel drive sibling; but it was nevertheless in the 1930s a significant participant in the growing German auto-market.

The DKW Typ 4=8 underwent several name changes and step by step modifications before production ended, in 1940, of what was by now the 1054 cc DKW Sonderklasse, but the V4 two-stroke engine and market positioning remained consistent throughout.

== Names ==
The name "4=8" was used for several versions of the car between 1929 and 1932 and was based on the way that on a two stroke engine every descent of the piston within the cylinder is driven by an explosion inside the cylinder, whereas in a four stroke engine only one in two of the cylinder's descents within the cylinder is driven by an explosion ( the alternate down strokes involving merely the induction - sucking in - of a combustible mixture of fuel and air). The case made by the name was that accordingly a two-stroke engine worked twice as hard as a four-stroke engine, and the little four-cylinder DKW was comparable, in terms of engine effort, with a four-stroke, eight-cylinder engine.

The name "Sonderklasse" which the car used between 1932 and 1934 does not translate comfortably into English, but the literal translation is "special class." The Sonderklasse name became associated with unfortunate publicity involving car body failures and the car was renamed in 1934, but the Sonderklasse name returned in 1937.

The name "Schwebeklasse" which was used for models produced between 1934 and 1937 apparently referred to the cars "floating" axle, a component of the suspension system which was advertised as providing superior handling. Schweben is a German verb for "to float," or "to hover.")

== Evolution ==
=== DKW 4=8 Typ P25 (1929) ===
The car launched in 1929 had a 4-cylinder V4 engine of 980cc mounted at the front and fed by two fuel pumps. Power, maximum output of which was claimed at 25 PS (18 kW), was transmitted to the rear wheels via a 3-speed manual transmission controlled from a lever in the middle of the floor. The wheels were attached to rigid axles each suspended on a traditional transverse leaf spring.

Like its smaller predecessor the car came with a timber frame body coated with synthetic leather. At this stage the only body offered was a two-door four seater limousine sedan/saloon with a perpendicular style characteristic of the period.

=== DKW 4=8 Typ V 800 (1930–1931) ===
It had been hoped that the reconfigured fuel feed arrangement and the use of four smaller cylinders in place of two larger ones would address the problem of high fuel consumption and the need for frequent spark-plug replacement which had been a feature of the manufacturer's first car, the predecessor of the Typ 4=8. When it became clear that fuel and spark-plug consumption were still excessive, a replacement model was introduced in 1930, the DKW V 800 4=8. This had a smaller 782 cc engine and only 20 PS of claimed power. The performance of the car was reduced, but not the fuel consumption. The engine tended to overheat, even in cold weather, and could become very jerky in operation.

The car was now offered either as a two-door cabrio-limousine (a soft topped four seater with fixed side windows) or as a full two-seater cabriolet.

=== DKW 4=8 Typ V 1000 (1931–1932) ===
In 1931 engine capacity was increased again, now to 990 cc, and claimed power returned to 25 PS. The name changed to DKW 4=8 Typ V 1000. The 990cc engine specification that continued to be included through several successive model upgrades, although changes to compression ratios and the increase in production and sales levels suggest that detailed work continued in order to address the more acute engine problems reported on the early cars. 1931 was also the year that the mechanically operated brake system was replaced by a hydraulically controlled one.

The timber framed body was now available as a four-seater limousine (sedan/saloon), a soft-topped, four-seater cabrio-limousine, or as a full two-seater cabriolet, all three body types supplied with two doors and all three offered at the same manufacturer's published retail price of 3,300 Marks.

=== DKW Sonderklasse Typ 432 ( 1932) ===
An interim replacement in 1932 was primarily distinguished by reshaped front wheel arches and slightly more stylish bodywork at the front. The car also acquired a new name and a new gear box. The DKW Sonderklasse Typ 432 was still powered by the now familiar 990cc 2-stroke V4 engine and the gear lever was still in the middle of the floor, but now the driver had a choice from four forward gear ratios rather than three.

The wheel base was also moderately lengthened from 2,700 mm (110 in) to 2,760 mm (109 in). The overall length of this interim 1932 car, which was offered only as a soft-topped four seater cabrio-limousine, increased from 3,680 mm (145 in) to 4,000 mm (160 in), apparently reflecting an increased rear overhang.

=== DKW Sonderklasse 1001 (1932–1934) ===
Later in 1932, in October, the car appeared with a further lengthened wheel base and claimed power from the 990 cc engine increased from 25 PS at 3,200 rpm to 26 PS at 3,500 rpm. The name was modified to DKW 1001 Sonderklasse and the rear suspension was redesigned, now featuring a "floating axle" (in German Schwebeachse) suspended from a high level laterally mounted leaf spring.

The wheelbase was again lengthened, this time from 2,760 mm (109 in) to 2,850 mm (112 in), with corresponding increases in overall body length. Once again customers could choose between a four-seater limousine (sedan/saloon), a soft-topped four seater cabrio-limousine or a full (two-seater) cabriolet, all three body types supplied with two doors and all three offered at the same manufacturer's published retail price down to 3,000 Marks, reflecting the currency deflation affecting many European economies in the mid-1930s.

The increased wheelbase enabled the manufacturer to provide more elegant bodies, with longer wings over the wheels and more elegantly raked rears, but the body was found to be less durable than that of the previous model. The traditional timber-frame construction seemed to be reaching the frontiers of its structural possibilities, and the cars tended to flex on bumpy roads or even, in the case of a few older cars, to come apart in the middle.

=== DKW Schwebeklasse (1934–1935) ===
1934 saw the arrival of a new model, still powered by the familiar 990cc engine and using the gearbox and underpinnings of the previous model, but the floating axle for the rear wheels was now joined by a second floating axle, suspended from a high level transversely mounted leaf spring, for the front wheels. The new suspension was said to confer superior handling, and DKW celebrated with another name change for the car which now became the DKW Schwebeklasse.

=== DKW Schwebeklasse (1935–1937) ===
In July 1935 the engine was bored out slightly further than before. Engine capacity now increased to 1054 cc and claimed power output to 32 PS. This was not a completely new engine, however: the stroke length of 68.5 mm remained unchanged as did the 2-stroke 4-cylinder configuration. The Solex FH 26 S carburettor had been replaced in 1934, during the previous car's production run, with twin Solex 26 BFH carburetters, and this new fuel feed arrangement was retained with the larger engine that arrived in 1935.

The Schwebeklasse came with a strikingly more streamlined silhouette than its predecessor, with longer front and rear overhangs. Timber-frame construction was at this stage retained, but there was no further increase in the wheelbase length, and the body was more rigid than that of the earlier model, though durability remained an issue. The choice of bodies was now between a four-seater limousine (sedan/saloon) and a soft-topped four seater cabrio-limousine: the two-seater cabriolet was no longer offered.

=== DKW Sonderklasse (1937–1940) ===
The name DKW Sonderklasse returned in 1937. The engine and suspension were unchanged from those on the previous year's car. Keen-eyed buyers might have spotted the reduction in brake-drum diameters on all four wheels from 250 millimetres (9.8 in) to 225mm.

The big news for 1937 was an all new steel body. This put an end to concerns that had arisen since 1932 when the timber frame bodies had gained a reputation for distorting or even snapping as the manufacturer introduced modified bodies with successively lengthened wheel-bases. The new body, which DKW celebrated with a return to the DKW Sonderklasse name, was in fact shared with the Wanderer W24 from DKW's fellow member of the Auto Union. In this form the Sonderklasse continued to be produced in useful volumes and without further significant changes until 1940.

== Commercial ==
During eleven years between 1929 and 1940 DKW produced approximately 24,000 of their small rear wheel drive cars. Approximately 8,000 of these were steel bodied cars produced during the final three years of production.
