= Zweirad Einkaufs Genossenschaft =

European purchasing association

The Zweirad-Einkaufs-Genossenschaft (ZEG) is a purchasing association of over 1,000 bicycle shops in Europe. The seat of the cooperative is in Cologne.

== History ==
ZEG was founded in 1966 by Bernhard Lakamper, Hans Krämer, Lisa Ludwigs († March 24, 2016), Paul Jung, Otto Dürr and three other bicycle dealers. The goal was to jointly create cheaper shopping opportunities for bicycle retailers. In 1978 the first own wheels were manufactured.

With NSU-Rubin, the first own brand was brought onto the market in 1983, which was a great success with 55,000 bicycles sold within one year. In the years that followed, ZEG continued to grow.

In 1994, specialist bicycle dealers outside of Germany joined the ZEG for the first time. First, dealers from the Netherlands joined, in 1999 bicycle dealers from Belgium, Austria and Switzerland joined the cooperative. French dealers followed in 2002 and Italian dealers in 2004. With Veloland, ZEG took over a dealer group in France in 2008, under whose name ZEG has been appearing in France ever since. Bicycle dealers from Lithuania, Latvia, Estonia and Poland were added in 2009. In 2014, ZEG had a turnover of 543 million euros with around 110 employees.

Since 1983, ZEG has not only acted as a purchasing cooperative, but also appears as a manufacturer on the bicycle market with its own brands, with the different brands being geared towards different areas. There has been a profit and loss transfer agreement with the Paul Nettersheim company since 1988. In 2002 there were 900 specialist shops in Germany alone. The current logo was introduced in the same year. From 2000 to 2009, ZEG also sold bicycles directly to end customers via its own online shop.

Since 2013, the Wanderer bicycle manufacturer has belonged to ZEG, which has thus expanded its range.

ZEG has the exclusive distribution rights for numerous products, e.g. for the folding bikes from the Dahon brand (until 2018) or the racing bikes from the Italian brand Pinarello. Pegasus, Bulls and Yazoo own-brand bicycles are manufactured in Vietnam and Cambodia.

In 2014, ZEG acquired the rights to the Hercules brand from the Accell Group.

In December 2015, ZEG took over the Rilchingen-Hanweiler (Saarland)-based bicycle division of the manufacturer Kettler, who was in insolvency proceedings at the time.

In 2016, ZEG entered the bike rental business and expanded into Switzerland. At the same time, it was announced that it would no longer be represented at the Eurobike trade fair. In 2019, the company returned there again. In the same year, uniform quality standards for bicycle workshops were developed together with TÜV Nord for the first time.

In 2017, ZEG took over the Swiss e-bike manufacturer Biketec AG (Flyer brand), which has since been renamed FLYER AG. In the same year, the first e-scooter was presented together with BMW.

Pedelecs with ABS were presented for the first time in 2018.

From 2017 to 2019, the site E-Bike.com was operated, which provided information about pedelecs.

== Brands of ZEG ==
Only the brands currently in active use are listed.

=== Bikes ===
- Pegasus (since 1984) – City, Trekking and Pedelec
- A.N.T.
- Bulls (since 1995, also named: BULL) – Mountainbike, Rennrad, Crossbike, BMX & Dirt/Slalom
- Fish Bone – BMX
- Flyer – Pedelec
- Hercules – Ebikes
- i:SY – Compact bike
- Katagra
- Kettler – City
- Simplex – City
- Wanderer - Ebike
- Yazoo – Kids Bikes
- Zemo – Pedelec

=== Accessories ===
- Apura – Bekleidung
- Centano – bikecomputer
- I-Rack – Racksystem (also known as CarryMore)
- Fuxon – Parts & Tools
- Monkey Link – Innovative fastening system
- NorthWind – Bags
- Styx – Tires and Stems

=== Other ===
- Eurorad – Leasing
- Travelbike – Renting
- BikeArena – sales chain
- Veloland – sales chain
- Der Zweirad Experte – sales chain
- Der Kleine Biker – Onlineshop

== Sponsoring ==
The mountain bike team BULLS has been sponsored by ZEG since 2007.

== Other ==
In 2015, the entire Bulls Green Mover series had to be called to workshops for a software update due to faulty software.

Using merchandise management software specially issued for members, the ZEG can show the customer on the websites of the affiliated dealers which partner has the bike they are looking for. The customer can have the desired bicycle or e-bike delivered to the dealer of his choice or to his home address.

Dealer training courses, which ZEG offers its members in various areas, take place on ZEG premises in Cologne.

Although the Bull brand has long since been abandoned, their website continued to exist until mid-2021.
