= Wanderer Puppchen =

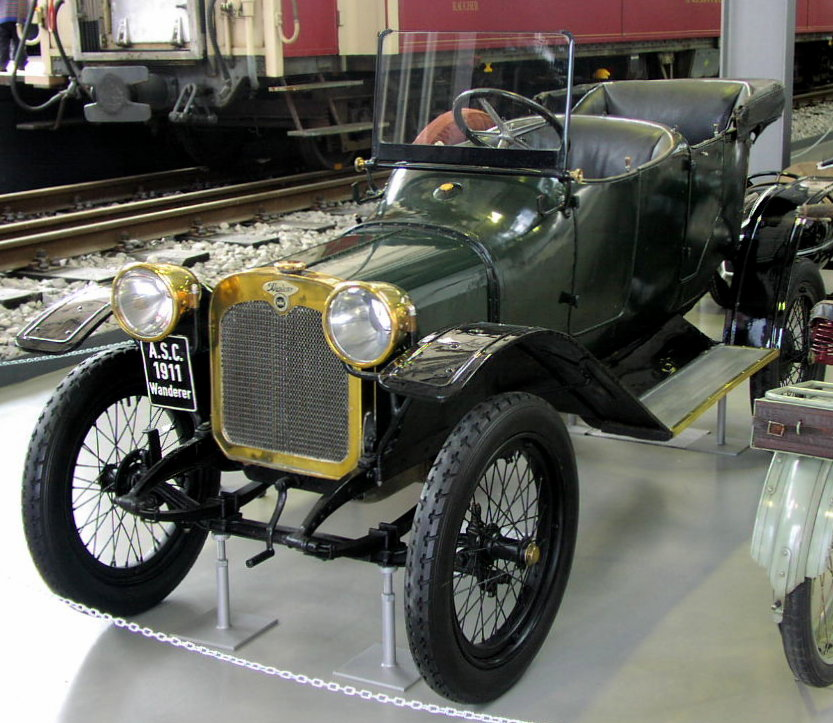
- 1911 Wanderer W1 pre-series vehicle, Deutsches Museum, Munich

Overview
- Manufacturer: Wanderer-Werke AG
- Also called: Wanderer W1 5/12, Wanderer W2 5/15, Wanderer W3 5/15, Wanderer W4 5/15, Wanderer W8 5/20
- Production: 1912–1926
- Assembly: Chemnitz, Germany

Powertrain
- Engine: 1147 cc IOE I4 (W1); 1222 cc IOE I4 (W2); 1286 cc IOE I4 (W3); 1306 cc OHV I4 (W4/W8)
- Transmission: 3-speed manual

Dimensions
- Wheelbase: 2,250 mm (89 in) / 2,395 mm (94.3 in)
- Length: 3,100–3,250 mm (122–128 in)
- Width: 1,330 mm (52 in)
- Height: 1,420–1,500 mm (56–59 in)

The Wanderer Puppchen was a small passenger car introduced by the Chemnitz-based Wanderer automotive company in 1911. It had a tiny 4-cylinder engine and a 3-speed gearbox, and went on sale the following year. The car was delivered as an open topped tourer with two seats positioned one behind the other. There were two doors, also one behind the other, and both on the left-hand side of the car.

== Name ==
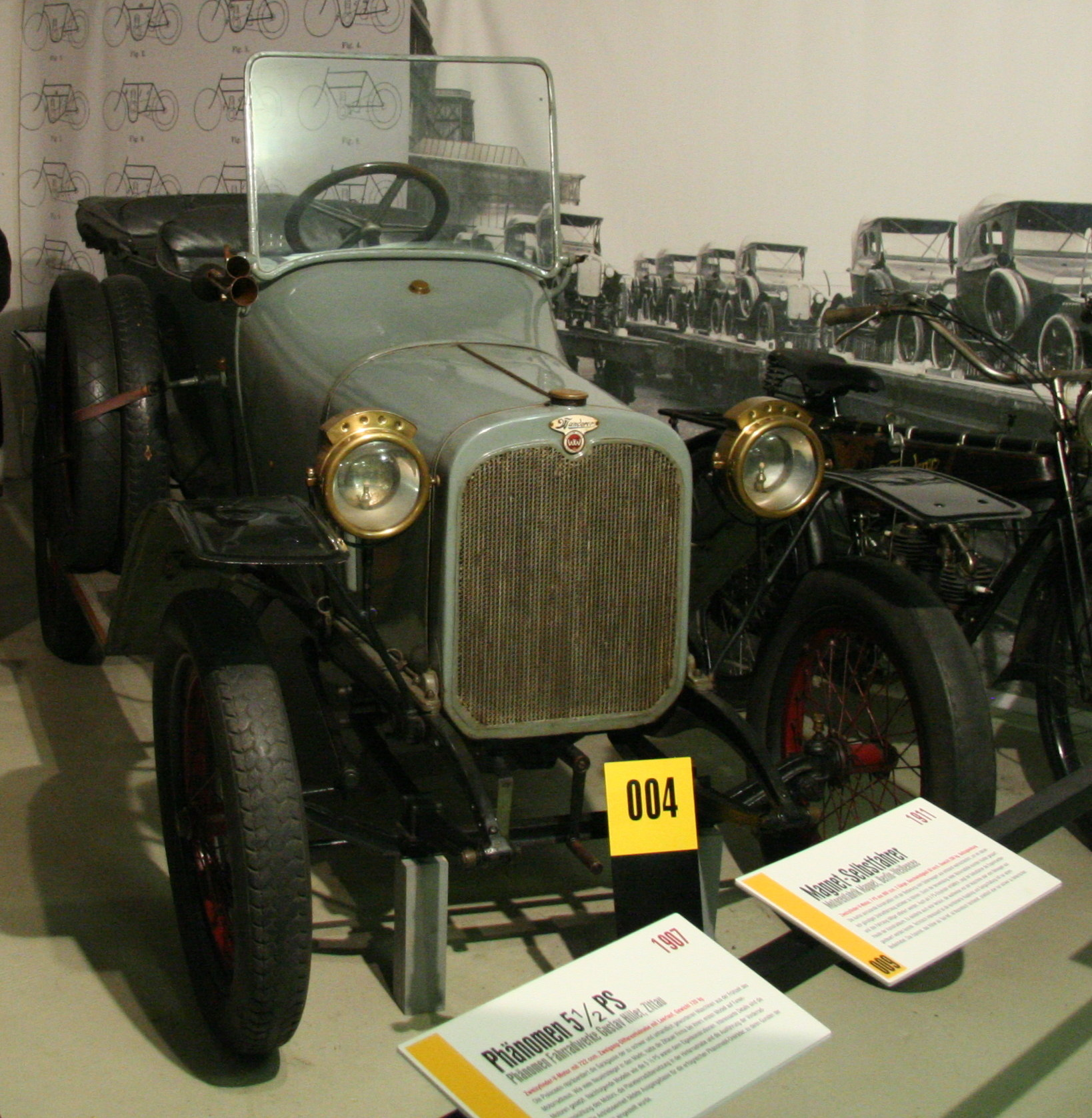
1913 Wanderer W3 5/15 PS

The small car quickly became known, affectionately, as the Puppchen ('little doll'), presumably derived from a 1912 operetta by Jean Gilbert. Nevertheless, its more conventional name was Wanderer W1 5/12 PS. "W1" reflected the fact that it was the first volume motor car offered by the Winklhofer & Jaenicke company who had adopted the brand name Wanderer (English equivalents might be "Rambler" or "Rover") for their motor vehicles in 1911. "5" was the fiscal horsepower rating, based on the engine capacity, and "12" was the actual horsepower claimed. During the ensuing years the Puppchen progressed through the W2, W3 and W4 models to the Wanderer W8, now with an actual claimed power output of 20 PS.

The Wanderer models W5, W6 and W7 were slightly larger cars which did not attract the Puppchen soubriquet.

== Engine ==
As launched, the first W1 model had a four-cylinder four-stroke engine of 1,147 cc offering 12 PS. The W2 version introduced in 1913 had its engine size increased to 1,222 cc and power output boosted to 15 PS. A year later the W3 featured a 1,286 cc engine. After the war, in 1919, the firm increased advertised power in what was now their W4 model to 17 PS, the engine being now an ohv 1,306 cc unit. The W4 continued to be offered till 1925. The final Puppchen W8, introduced in 1925 and withdrawn a year later, retained the 1,306 cc engine capacity, but with claimed power now raised to 20 PS.

== Body ==
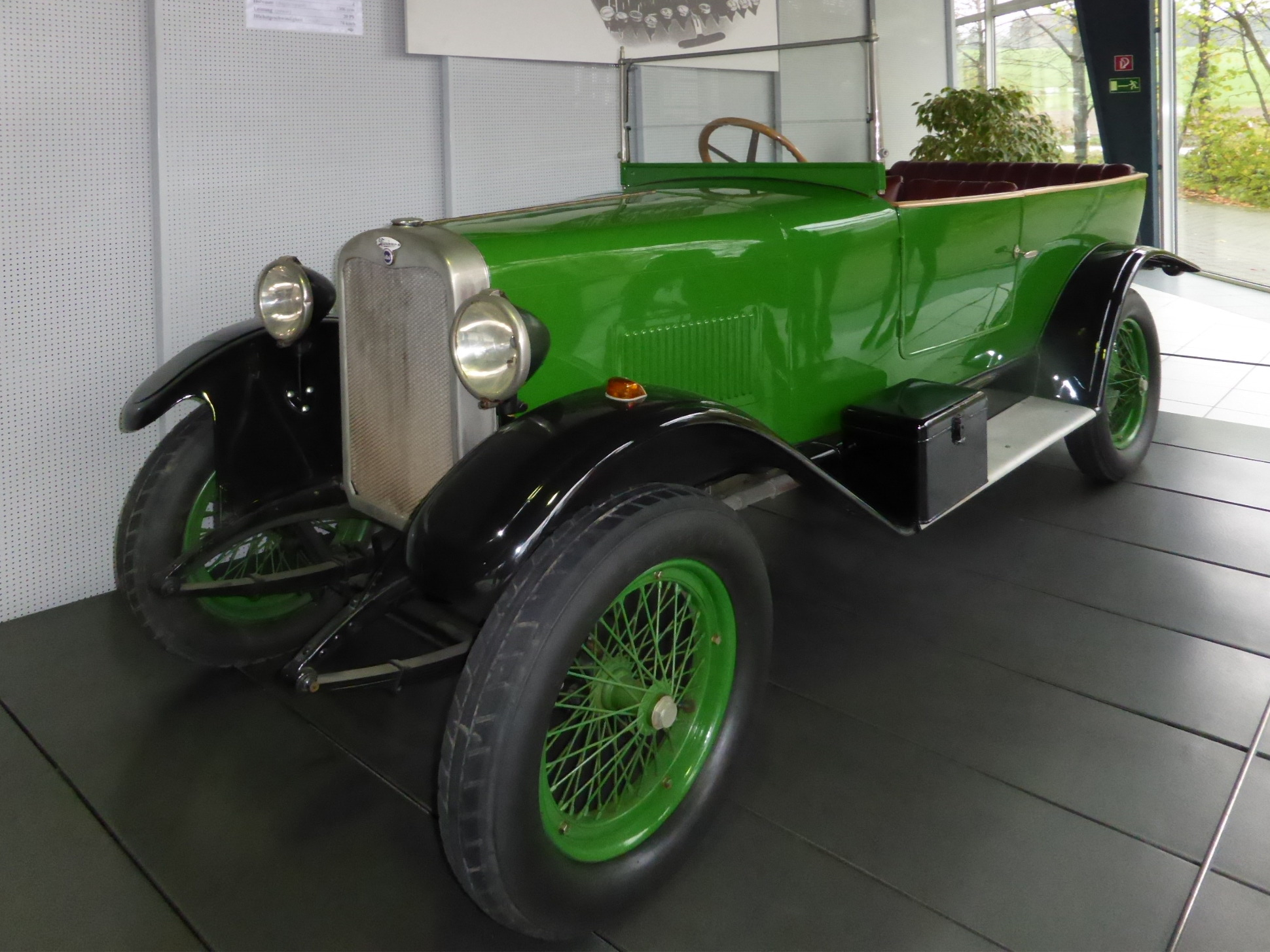
Wanderer W8 5/20 PS

The car continued to be delivered as an open topped tourer throughout its life. However, the 1913 upgrade saw the originally Model H body with one seat behind the other complemented by the Model N in which the two seats were positioned side by side. Cars in which the passenger sat beside the driver featured just one door, however: this door was again positioned on the car’s left side.

With the appearance in 1914 of the W3 version, Wanderer took the opportunity to offer the Model Nv body which provided a third seat. The W3 continued unchanged until 1919.

The principal advances on the W4 concerned the engine. A further change in 1919 was the withdrawal of the by now unfashionable Model H configurations. A passenger in a standard bodied two-seater Puppchens was now obliged to sit beside the driver. With the W8, which replaced the W4 in 1925, the Puppchen was now available with a four-seater body.

== End of production ==
In 1926 Wanderer withdrew from the 'baby car' market which, as matters turned out, was poorly timed. By the time the Puppchen was withdrawn, in that year, approximately 9,000 of the little cars had been produced.

The small car market segment in Germany was now dominated by the Opel Laubfrosch, which had been introduced in 1924.
