= Kettler =

German manufacturing company

- Type: GmbH & Co. KG
- Industry: Sports equipment
- Founded: 1949
- Founder: Heinz Kettler
- Headquarters: Ense, Germany
- Key people: Karin Kettler
- Products: Bicycles, exercise machines, Kettcar, patio furniture, table tennis tables, pedal vehicles
- Number of employees: 2000 (est.)
- Website: intl.kettler.net

Kettler (German pronunciation: [ˈkɛtlɐ]) is a German company based in Ense-Parsit. The company produces riding toys, leisure gear, patio furniture and exercise equipment.

In the United Kingdom Kettler (G.B.) Limited was registered in 1985 and is the owner of the KETTLER trademark in the UK. Since the death of Karin Kettler it has operated as an autonomous company within the Heinz Kettler Foundation. The company retains the brand values of the original Kettler company and concentrates mainly on outdoor and indoor furniture. The Managing Director, Paul Bevington has been with the company since 1990.

== History ==
The company was founded in 1949 in Parsit by Heinz Kettler. Originally starting in the attic of a sawmill, Kettler grew into a worldwide manufacturing and distribution organization, selling products in over 60 countries. In 2005, Heinz Kettler died and his daughter Karin took over the company. The CEO is Ludger Busche.

The company filed for bankruptcy under own management (similar to Chapter 11 bankruptcy) to avoid an uncontrolled takeover by an investor. The bicycle unit was subsequently sold to ZEG (Zweirad Einkaufs Genossenschaft) in December 2015, and the company exited the bankruptcy proceedings in March 2016. Karin Kettler, who had mostly retired from the day to day business, died in a traffic accident in March 2017, aged 57.

The company filed for bankruptcy again in July 2018, and the court opened the bankruptcy proceedings again in October 2018. On October 11, 2019, the end of the company was decided, and the employees were informed about this on October 14. Production officially ended at the end of January 2020.

== Products ==
In 1949, Kettler started producing patio furniture and added the Kettcar toy car to their inventory in 1962.

In 1977, Kettler added aluminium bicycles to their product line and started producing fitness equipment and table tennis tops soon after. Kettler now sells a full line of children's toys, from push trikes for toddlers to licensed pedal tractors for children.

=== Toys ===
The model of the original Kettcar (2010)

==== Kettcar ====
The Kettcar was introduced in 1962 as Kettler's first pedal vehicle. Similar to a bicycle, the pedals turn the wheels over a chain. The Kettcar, however, has four wheels and requires no balancing to ride. Since its debut, Kettler has made many different varieties of the Kettcar and has sold more than 15 million of them worldwide.

The popularity of the Kettcar in Germany is so immense that the word "Kettcar" has become a synonym for four wheeled pedal cars and was entered into the Duden, the official German dictionary, describing it as a "pedal powered chain vehicle for children" The first four letters of the word Kettcar are derived from the company "Kettler" and the German word for chain, "Kette". The last three letters are derived from the word "car".

==== Licensed pedal vehicles ====
Next to their own brand name, Kettler produces and sells pedal vehicles under the license of multiple other companies. Kettler is the sole producer of CAT, Case, Massey Ferguson and New Holland pedal tractors.

=== Table tennis tables ===
The official table tennis table used in the 1996 Summer Olympics

Kettler produces a number of table tennis tables, that are tournament bounce certified. In January 1996, the committee of the Olympics in Atlanta chose Kettler as the official provider for table tennis gear for the summer games. Kettler still manufactures and sells the same table that was used in the Olympics under the name "Atlanta".

=== Bicycles ===
Kettler started manufacturing aluminium bicycles in 1977. The bicycle unit was sold in 2015; ZEG as the new owners continue to manufacture the bicycles under the "Kettler Alurad" brand.

=== Fitness ===
Kettler has a fitness equipment line, ranging from exercise bikes and crosstrainers to treadmills and rowers.

=== Furniture ===
Having its roots in building furniture, Kettler continued producing it and expanded its selection to aluminum, wrought iron, resin and teak wood furniture. Kettler produces furniture mainly for outdoor use.
