= List of Isle of Wight-based O2 Class locomotives =

Below are the names and numbers of the 23 LSWR O2 class locomotives that were transferred to the Isle of Wight. Another successful publicity campaign by the Southern Railway gave them names from 1925 onwards, representing places in the Island.

BR/SR No.	SR Name	LSWR No.	Builder	Built	To IoW	Withdrawn	Notes
W14	Fishbourne	178	LSWR, Nine Elms	1889	1936	1967	
W15	Cowes	195	LSWR, Nine Elms	1890	1936	1956	Surplus after Bembridge Branch closure
W16	Ventnor	217	LSWR, Nine Elms	1892	1936	1967	
W17	Seaview	208	LSWR, Nine Elms	1891	1930	1967	
W18	Ningwood	220	LSWR, Nine Elms	1892	1930	1966	
W19	Osborne	206	LSWR, Nine Elms	1891	1923	1955	Surplus after Bembridge Branch closure
W20	Shanklin	211	LSWR, Nine Elms	1892	1923	1967	
W21	Sandown	205	LSWR, Nine Elms	1891	1924	1966	
W22	Brading	215	LSWR, Nine Elms	1892	1924	1967	
W23	Totland	188	LSWR, Nine Elms	1890	1925	1955	Surplus after Bembridge Branch closure
W24	Calbourne	209	LSWR, Nine Elms	1891	1925	1967	Preserved on the Isle of Wight Steam Railway
W25	Godshill	190	LSWR, Nine Elms	1890	1925	1963	
W26	Whitwell	210	LSWR, Nine Elms	1891	1925	1966	
W27	Merstone	184	LSWR, Nine Elms	1890	1926	1967	
W28	Ashey	186	LSWR, Nine Elms	1890	1926	1967	
W29	Alverstone	202	LSWR, Nine Elms	1891	1926	1966	
W30	Shorwell	219	LSWR, Nine Elms	1892	1926	1965	
W31	Chale	180	LSWR, Nine Elms	1890	1927	1967	Subject of an unsuccessful preservation.
W32	Bonchurch	226	LSWR, Nine Elms	1892	1928	1965	
W33	Bembridge	218	LSWR, Nine Elms	1892	1936	1967	
W34	Newport	201	LSWR, Nine Elms	1891	1947	1955	Surplus after Bembridge Branch closure
W35	Freshwater	181	LSWR, Nine Elms	1890	1949	1967	
W36	Carisbrooke	198	LSWR, Nine Elms	1891	1949	1965	
