= LSWR O2 Class W24 Calbourne =

W24 Calbourne
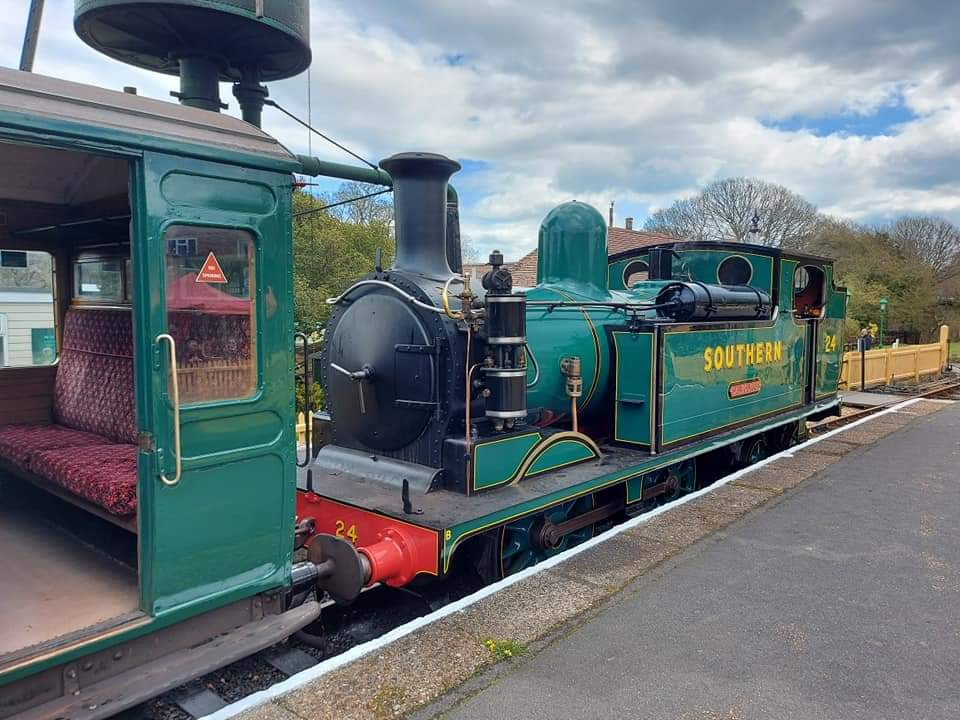
- W24 Calbourne, painted in Southern Malachite Green, at Havenstreet June 2021, Isle of Wight Steam Railway
Type and origin
- Power type: Steam
- Designer: William Adams
- Builder: LSWR Nine Elms Works
- Build date: 1891
Specifications
- Configuration
  - Whyte: 0-4-4T
- Gauge: 4 ft 8 1/2 in (1,435 mm)
- Driver dia.: 58 in (1.473 m)
- Trailing dia.: 37 in (0.940 m)
- Length: 30 ft 8.5 in (9.360 m)
- Loco weight: 48.40 long tons (49.2 t)
- Fuel type: Coal
- Fuel capacity: 1.50 long tons (1.5 t); later 3.25 long tons (3.3 t)
- Water cap.: 800 imp gal (3,600 L)
- Boiler pressure: 160 psi (1.10 MPa)
- Cylinders: Two, inside
- Cylinder size: 17 1/2×24 in (445×610 mm)
Performance figures
- Tractive effort: 17,235 lbf (76.67 kN)
Career
- Operators: LSWR, Southern Railway, British Railways, Isle of Wight Steam Railway
- Class: LSWR: O2; SR: O2
- Power class: Isle of Wight: B BR: 0P
- Locale: Great Britain

W24 Calbourne is an example of the Adams LSWR O2 class 0-4-4T, which is based at the Isle of Wight Steam Railway. It is the sole survivor of its class.

== History ==
One of 60 Adams O2 class 0-4-4Ts, it was built by the LSWR in December 1891 at Nine Elms locomotive works and numbered LSWR 209. It was based at Fratton before moving on to Exeter. It passed into Southern Railway ownership in 1923.

The locomotive was transferred to the Isle of Wight on 26 April 1925 as the island's locomotive stock needed major modernisation, it was re-numbered W24 and given the name Calbourne, after a village on the island. The locomotive was fitted with Westinghouse air brake equipment to allow it to haul island passenger carriages, and had an extension fitted to its coal bunker to increase its range of operation.

Calbourne remained on the island under British Railway ownership, and was retained after steam services ended, with W31 Chale, as a works engine for the Ryde to Shanklin line electrification, until withdrawal in March 1967 when electrification of the line was complete.

Calbourne was acquired by the Wight Locomotive Society in 1967 as the flagship locomotive of the Isle of Wight Steam Railway, which has been its permanent home ever since. Calbourne is the only surviving O2 locomotive, the remainder having been scrapped.

== Preservation ==
In 1967 the Wight Locomotive Society acquired Calbourne from British Railways and it spent its early years in Southern Railway Malachite Green with Sunshine lettering. After an overhaul in 1992 it was repainted in Southern Railway Maunsell lined Olive Green with an unmodified coal bunker. Calbourne was withdrawn in 2002 for overhaul re-emerging in 2010 in BR Standard Mixed-Traffic Black livery with red and white lining and the larger bunker re-fitted. It was later repainted into Southern Railway malachite green livery.

== Livery ==
=== LSWR ===
- LSWR passenger Yellow Ochre/Brown livery with the initials 'LSW' on the water tank sides.

=== Southern Railway ===
- Maunsell lined Olive Green.
- Wartime plain black with Sunshine lettering
- Malachite Green with Sunshine lettering.

=== British Railways ===
- BR Standard Mixed-Traffic Black livery with red and white lining.

=== Preservation ===
- Unlined BR Black
- Malachite Green with Sunshine lettering.
- Maunsell lined Olive Green.
- BR Standard Mixed-Traffic Black livery with red and white lining(current livery).
- LSWR passenger Yellow Ochre/Brown livery with the initials 'LSW' on the water tank sides.

== Gallery ==
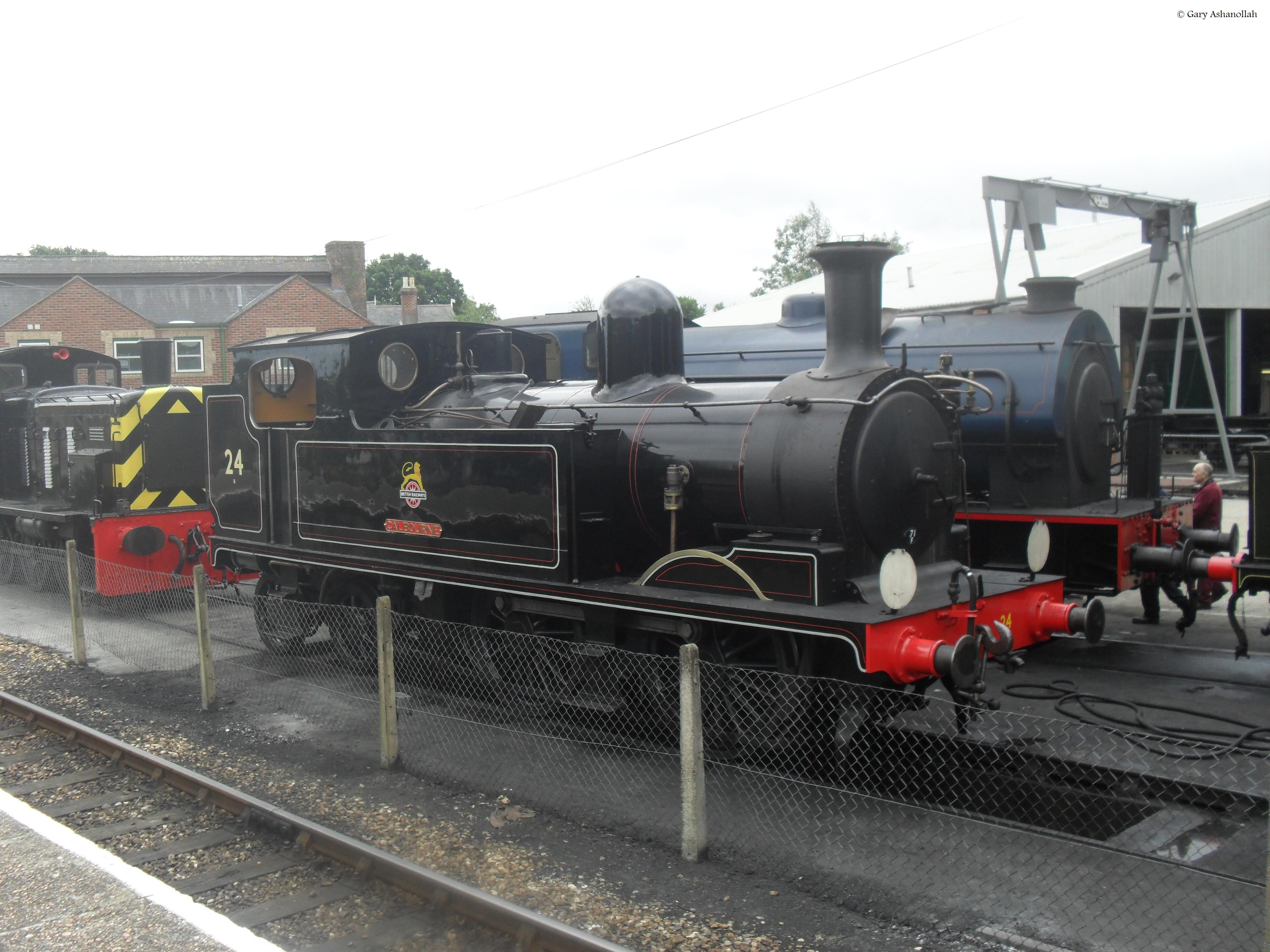
W24 Calbourne at Havenstreet station (Isle of Wight Steam Railway) in August 2010. Also visible are British Railways Class 03 No D2059 and WD92 Waggoner.

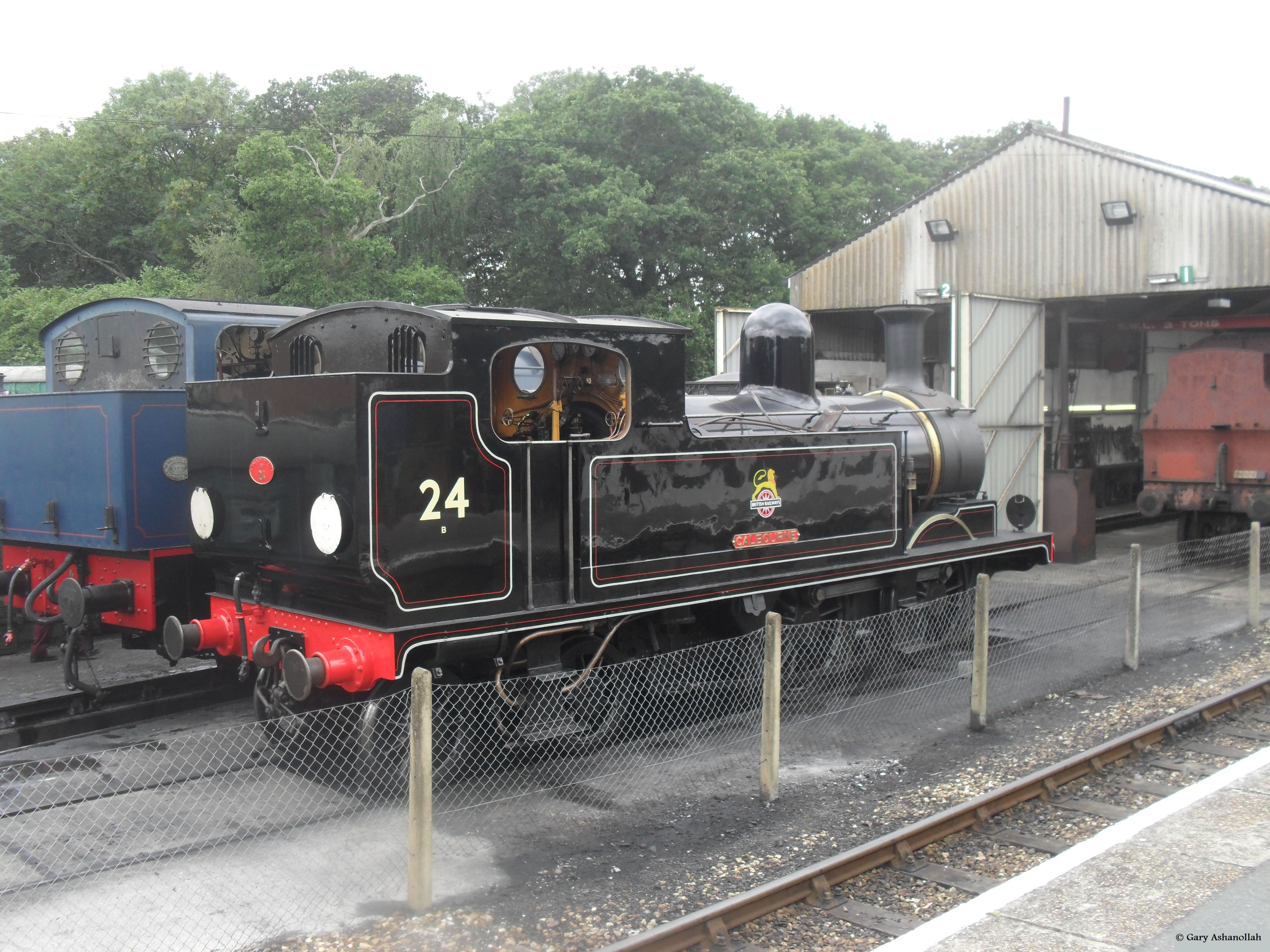
W24 Calbourne at Haventreet Station August 2010.

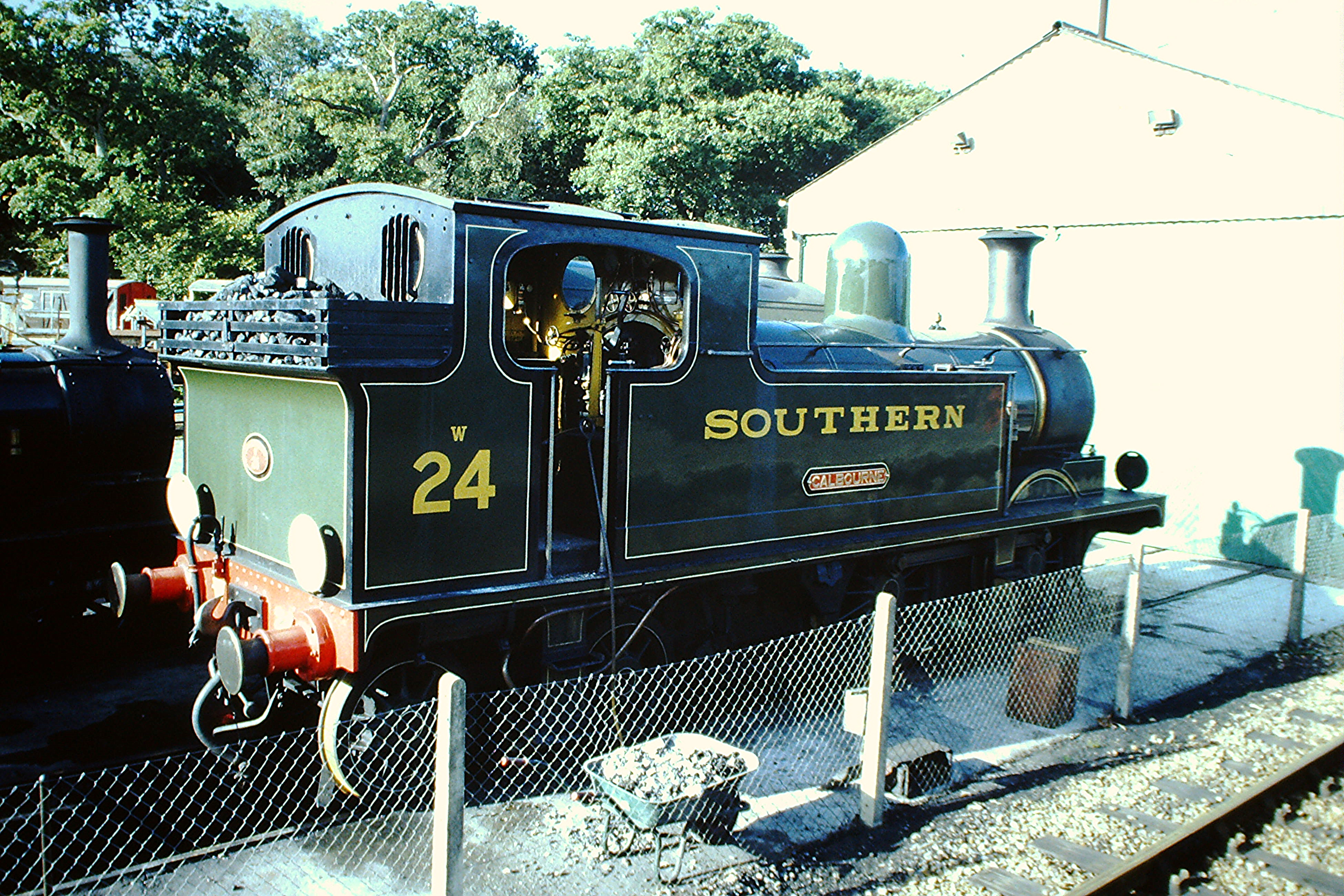
W24 Calbourne at Havenstreet Station in October 2000, in SR livery with original bunker.

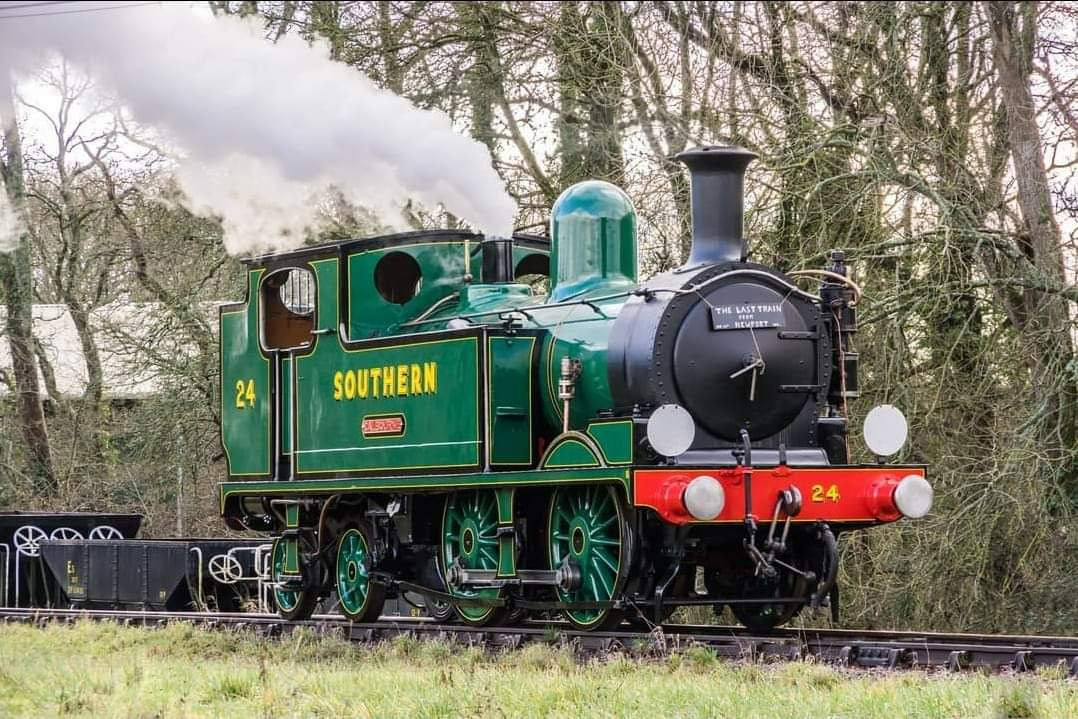
"W24 Calbourne" in Malachite Green January 2021

== See also ==
- List of Isle of Wight-based O2 Class locomotives
