= Wanderer (company) =

German manufacturer of bicycles, motorcycles and automobiles

- Industry: Bicycles, Automobiles
- Founded: 1896 by Johann Baptist Winklhofer und Richard Adolf Jaenicke
- Defunct: 1945
- Fate: merged into Auto Union (car division only)
- Headquarters: Saxony, Germany
- Parent: Auto Union

Wanderer was a German manufacturer of bicycles, motorcycles, automobiles, vans and other machinery. Established as Winklhofer & Jaenicke in 1896 by Johann Baptist Winklhofer and Richard Adolf Jaenicke, the company used the Wanderer brand name from 1911, making civilian automobiles until 1941 and military vehicles until 1945.

Wanderer was last active as a financial holding company without its own business operations and went bankrupt in July 2010. The brand was then acquired by Cologne-based manufacturer Zweirad Einkaufs Genossenschaft (ZEG).

== History to 1945 ==
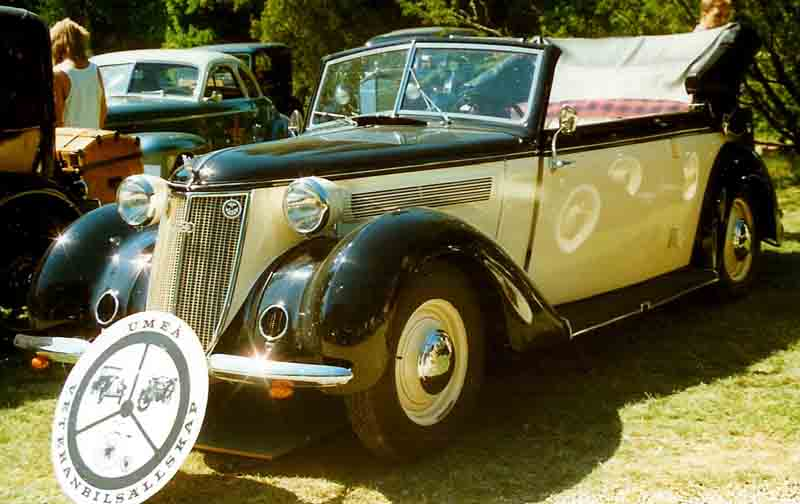
Wanderer W 23 Cabriolet 1938

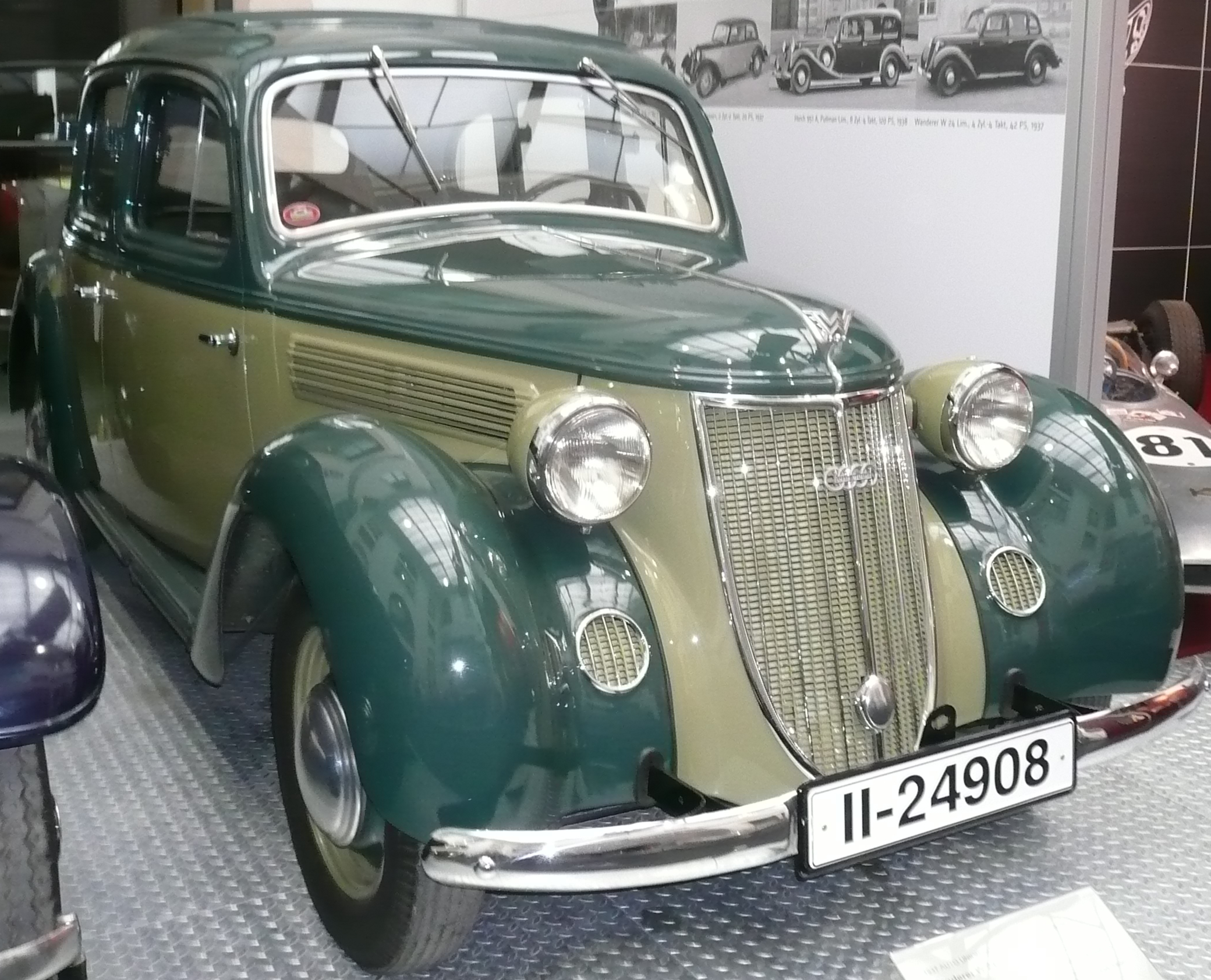
Wanderer W 24 1937

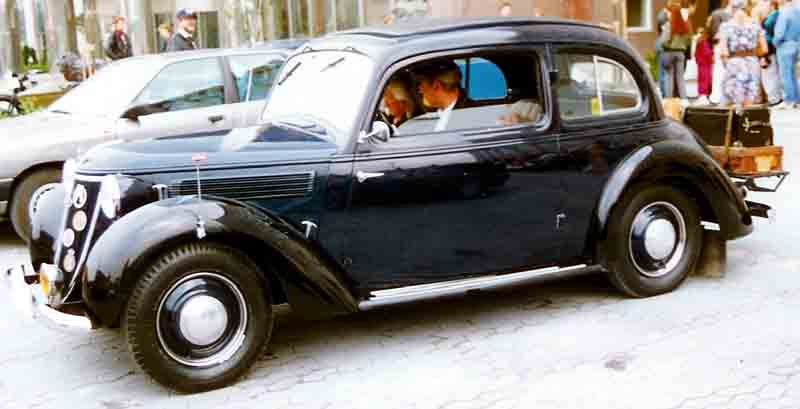
Wanderer W 24 1939

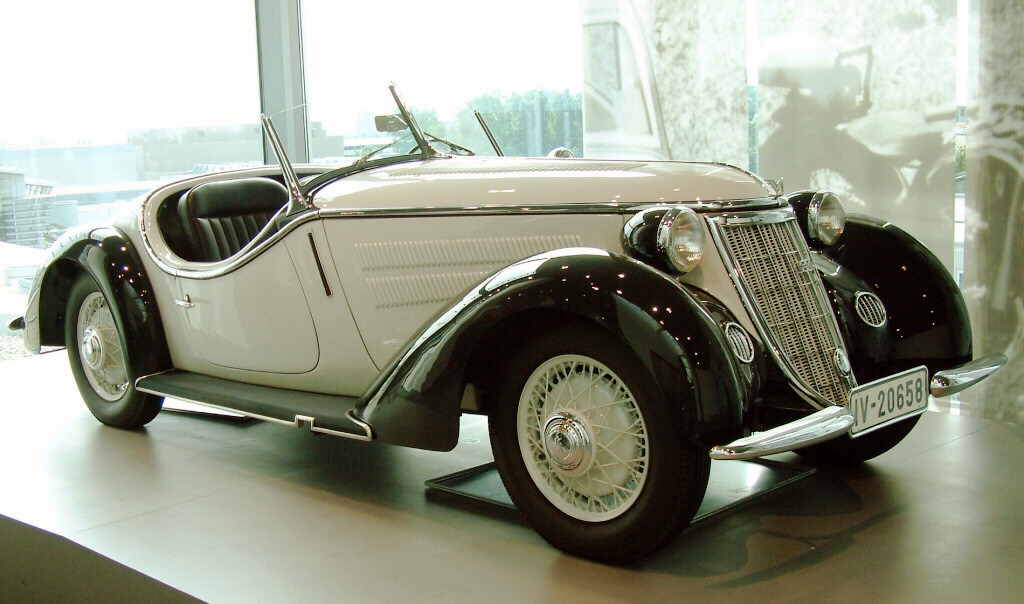
Wanderer W25K (1936–1938)

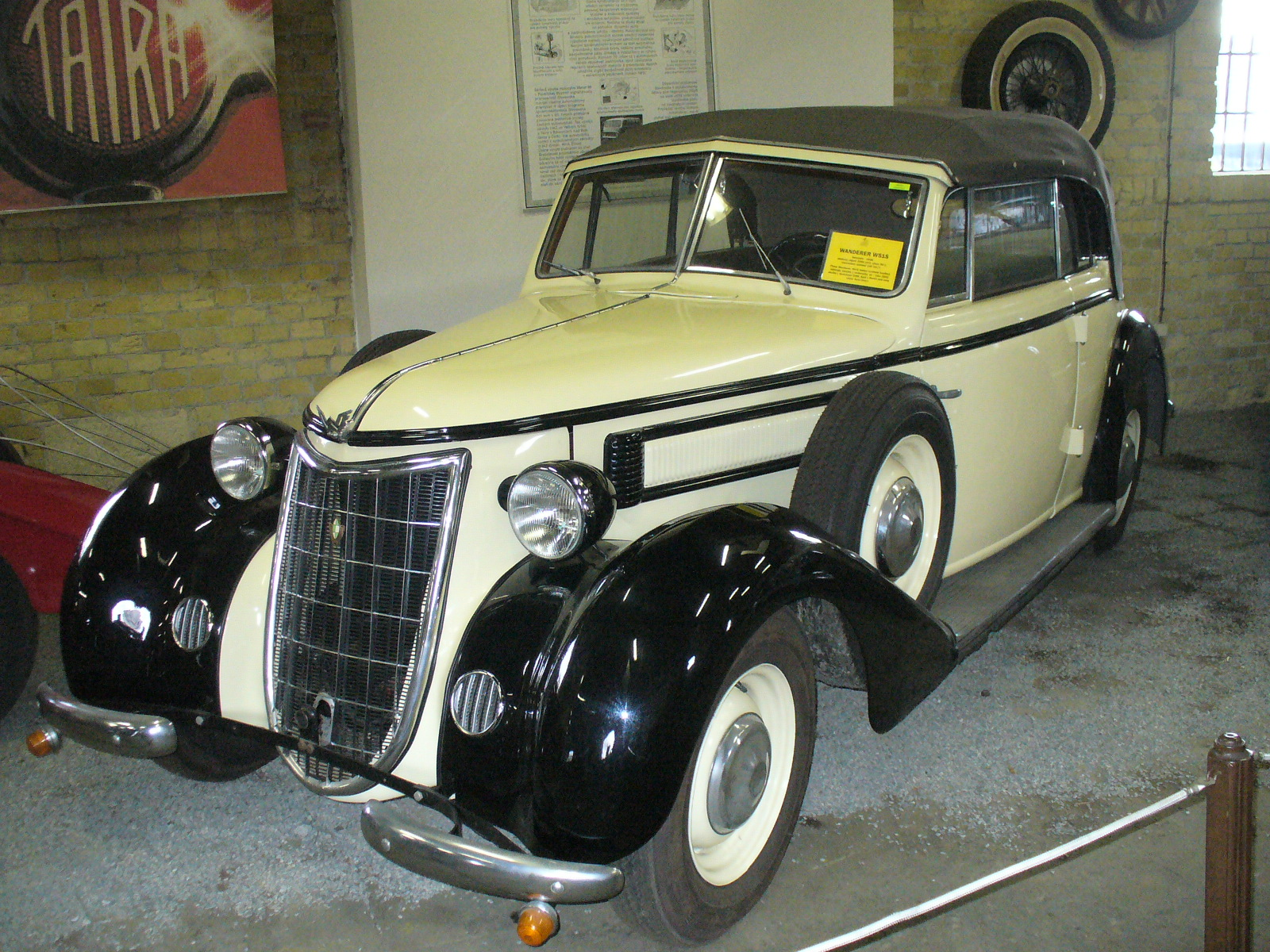
Wanderer W51S

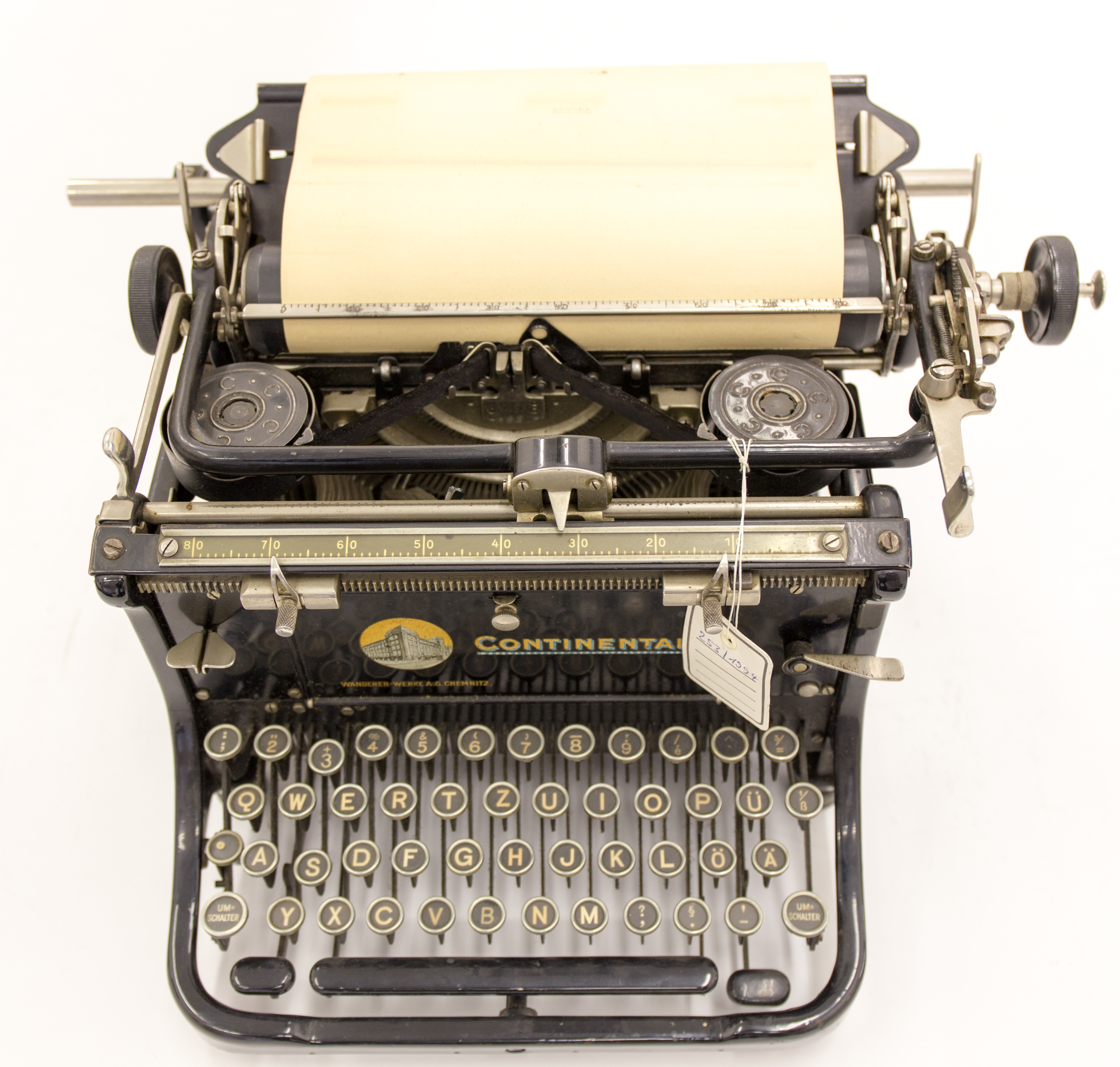
Continental typewriter from Wanderer, currently at the MEK

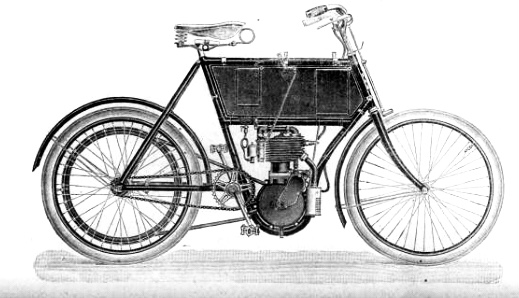
Wanderer (1903)

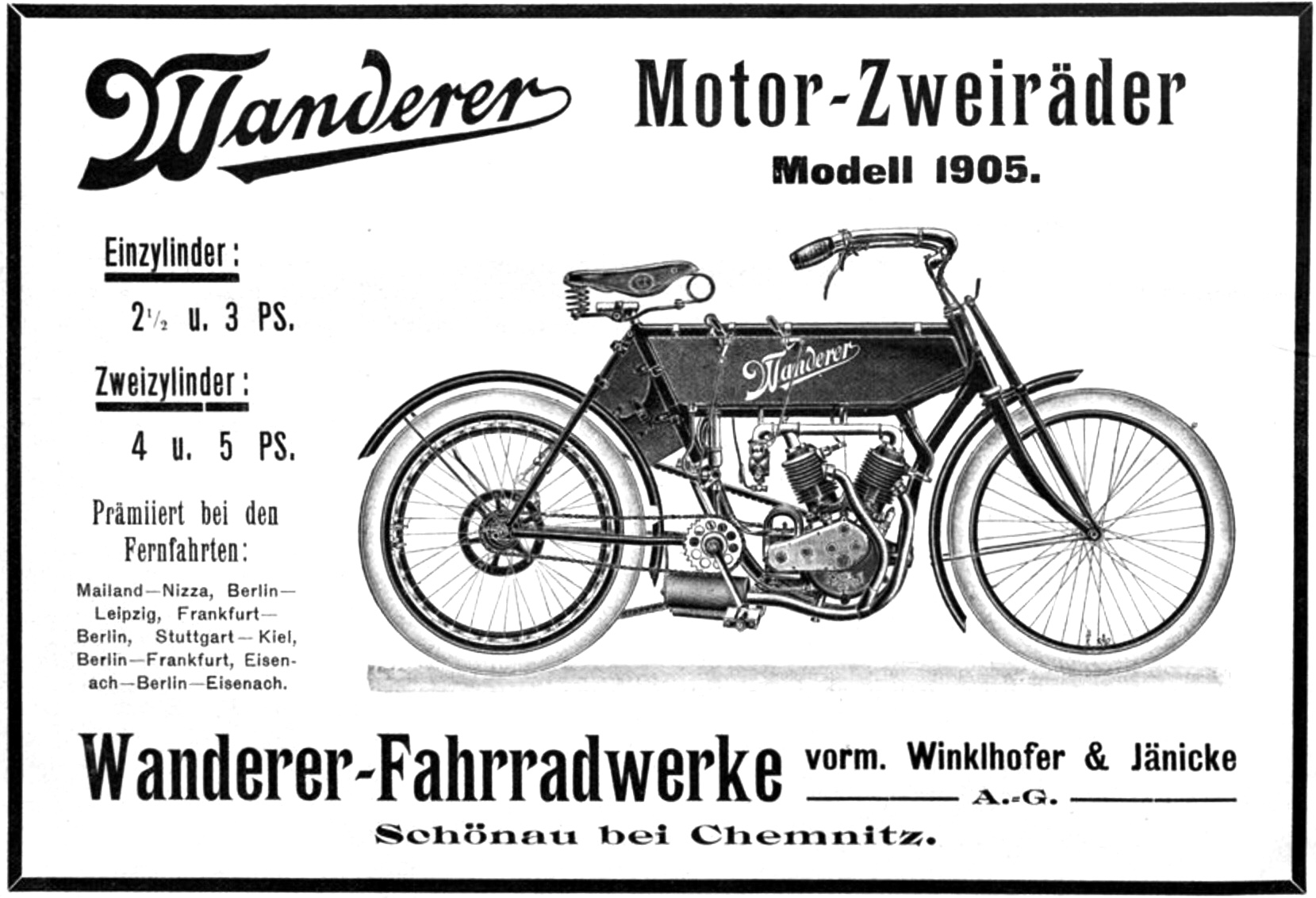
Wanderer Motorcycle advertisement (1905)

Winklhofer & Jaenicke was established in 1896 in Chemnitz. It built motorcycles from 1902 and automobiles from 1903. The Wanderer brand was chosen in 1911 for overseas exports and was soon adopted for domestic sales.

The first two- or three-seater models used four-cylinder 1145 cc and 1220 cc engines. The 1220 cc model lasted until 1925. The first six-cylinder model appeared in 1928. By 1926, when Wanderer introduced a successful Typ 10, the company was making 25 vehicles a day; parts were made at the old plant in Chemnitz and assembled at the 1927 built new site in Siegmar, delivered by rail right to the assembly line. Motorcycle production continued in Chemnitz alone.

During the Great Depression, in 1929, the company owner, Dresdner Bank, sold the motorcycle business to František Janeček, and in 1932 divested the rest of Wanderer. The car division with its Siegmar factory became part of Auto Union together with Horch, Audi and DKW. In this quartet, Horch was positioned as the luxury brand, DKW and Slaby-Beringer built cheap two-stroke cars, and Audi and Wanderer competed in the Middle class and Upper Middle class segments the same way GM's Buick and Oldsmobile divisions were used, technologically advanced small cars (the heaviest, 6-cylinder Wanderers reached 1.5 tons dry weight). Wanderers of the Nazi period acquired a trademark radiator design, shaped as a heraldic shield.

The next model W17 7/35 PS was propelled by a new 1692 cc OHV four-cylinder engine developed by Ferdinand Porsche. In 1933 the new Audi Front was equipped with the Wanderer W22 engine, a 1950 cc OHV six-cylinder, also a Porsche design. The top model from 1936 to 1939 was the W50, propelled by a 2257 cc six-cylinder engine. From 1937 on there were also sporting fours (W24 and W25) and another six-cylinder model of 2632 cc (W23), propelled by new Flathead engines constructed by Auto Union itself. Wanderer cars were always admired for their high quality and sporting character.

During World War II, all civilian production was replaced in 1941 with licence-built military vehicles, such as Steyr 1500A light truck. A subcamp of Flossenbürg concentration camp, KZ Siegmar-Schonau, was operated during the war to provide slave labour for the Wanderer vehicle plants. From 1943 on the Auto Union Siegmar plant produced Maybach HL230 V12 engines, used in many heavy tanks of the German Wehrmacht.

The Wanderer Siegmar plant (now Chemnitz) of Auto Union was destroyed in early 1945, closing this chapter in the history of automobiles. Post-war efforts to restore East German auto industry concentrated on Auto Union facilities in Zwickau and Zschopau: Wanderer car production never recovered, with Auto Union relocating to Ingolstadt, West Germany, where the company was rebuilt based using the DKW and, ultimately, the Audi brand.

== History after 1945 ==
Following the end of World War II, a referendum on 30 June 1946 saw the expropriation of war and Nazi criminals by the occupying Soviet forces. This resulted in both the Wanderer works company and Auto Union enterprises being partially dismantled and their assets taken as reparations to the Soviet Union by 1948. This gave way to the rearrangement of state-owned enterprises (VEB):

- the car factory in Siegmar was allocated as part of the Vehicle Construction Industry Association (IFA) and was later part of the VEB Barkas-Werke (which is now the VW engine factory in Chemnitz).
- Meanwhile, the machine tool area initially continued as VEB Wanderer-Fräsmaschinenbau was changed to VEB Fritz-Heckert-Werk in 1951. It later became the parent company of the VEB machine tool combine ‘Fritz-Heckert’ (now the Starrag Group).
- The office machine business in Schönau was reorganised as VEB Wanderer-Continental office machine works, under the umbrella of VVB Mechanik. It was then merged with the former Astrawerke AG and formed as VEB Büromaschinen Chemnitz in 1953, but two years later spun off again as VEB Industriewerke Karl-Marx-Stadt and commissioned with the production of aircraft engines. The production of typewriters passed to the Optima office machine factory in Erfurt, whilst calculators and booking machines were further developed and created in the VEB booking machine factory in Karl-Marx-Stadt (formerly known as the Astrawerke). Following the suspension of the GDR's own aircraft construction in 1961, hydraulic pumps and vehicle engines were manufactured in the industrial plant. A small part of it managed to remain after the reunification as Sachsenhydraulik GmbH, before eventually being passed to the US company Parker-Hannifin.

== Automobile models ==
| Type | Years | Engine type | Displacement | Engine power | Top speed |
|---|---|---|---|---|---|
| W1 (5/12 PS) "Puppchen" | 1912–1913 | straight-4 | 1147 cc | 12 PS (8.8 kW; 12 hp) | 70 km/h (43 mph) |
| W2 (5/15 PS) "Puppchen" | 1913–1914 | straight-4 | 1222 cc | 15 PS (11 kW; 15 hp) | 70 km/h (43 mph) |
| W3 (5/15 PS) "Puppchen" | 1914–1919 | straight-4 | 1286 cc | 15 PS (11 kW; 15 hp) | 70 km/h (43 mph) |
| W4 (5/15 PS) "Puppchen" | 1919–1924 | straight-4 | 1306 cc | 17 PS (13 kW; 17 hp) | 78 km/h (48 mph) |
| W6 (6/18 PS) | 1921–1923 | straight-4 | 1551 cc | 18 PS (13 kW; 18 hp) | 80 km/h (50 mph) |
| W9 (6/24 PS) | 1923–1925 | straight-4 | 1551 cc | 24 PS (18 kW; 24 hp) | 85 km/h (53 mph) |
| W8 (5/20 PS) “Puppchen” | 1925–1926 | straight-4 | 1306 cc | 20 PS (15 kW; 20 hp) | 78 km/h (48 mph) |
| W10/I (6/30 PS) | 1926–1928 | straight-4 | 1551 cc | 30 PS (22 kW; 30 hp) | 85 km/h (53 mph) |
| W10/II (8/40 PS) | 1927–1929 | straight-4 | 1940 cc | 40 PS (29 kW; 39 hp) | 95 km/h (59 mph) |
| W11 (10/50 PS) | 1928–1930 | straight-6 | 2540 cc | 50 PS (37 kW; 49 hp) | 90 km/h (56 mph) |
| W10/IV (6/30 PS) | 1930–1932 | straight-4 | 1563 cc | 30 PS (22 kW; 30 hp) | 85 km/h (53 mph) |
| W11 (10/50 PS) | 1930–1933 | straight-6 | 2540 cc | 50 PS (37 kW; 49 hp) | 97 km/h (60 mph) |
| W14 (12/65 PS) | 1931–1932 | straight-6 | 2970–2995 cc | 65 PS (48 kW; 64 hp) | 105 km/h (65 mph) |
| W15 (6/30 PS) | 1932 | straight-4 | 1563 cc | 30 PS (22 kW; 30 hp) | 85 km/h (53 mph) |
| W17 (7/35 PS) | 1932–1933 | straight-6 | 1690 cc | 35 PS (26 kW; 35 hp) | 90 km/h (56 mph) |
| W20 (8/40 PS) | 1932–1933 | straight-6 | 1950 cc | 40 PS (29 kW; 39 hp) | 95 km/h (59 mph) |
| W21 / W235 / W35 | 1933–1936 | straight-6 | 1690 cc | 35 PS (26 kW; 35 hp) | 95 km/h (59 mph) |
| Wanderer W23S | 1937–1939 | straight-6 | 2651 cc | 62 PS (46 kW; 61 hp) | 90 km/h (56 mph) |
| W22 / W240 / W40 | 1933–1938 | straight-6 | 1950 cc | 40 PS (29 kW; 39 hp) | 100 km/h (62 mph) |
| W245 / W250 | 1935 | straight-6 | 2257 cc | 50 PS (37 kW; 49 hp) | 100 km/h (62 mph) - 105 km/h (65 mph) |
| W45 / W50 / Spezial W51 | 1936–1938 | straight-6 | 2257 cc | 55 PS (40 kW; 54 hp) | 100 km/h (62 mph) - 105 km/h (65 mph) |
| W25K | 1936–1938 | straight-6 | 1950 cc | 85 PS (63 kW; 84 hp) | 145 km/h (90 mph) |
| W52 | 1937 | straight-6 | 2651 cc | 62 PS (46 kW; 61 hp) | 115 km/h (71 mph) |
| W24 | 1937–1940 | straight-4 | 1767 cc | 42 PS (31 kW; 41 hp) | 105 km/h (65 mph) |
| W26 | 1937–1940 | straight-6 | 2651 cc | 62 PS (46 kW; 61 hp) | 115 km/h (71 mph) |
| W23 | 1937–1941 | straight-6 | 2651 cc | 62 PS (46 kW; 61 hp) | 105 km/h (65 mph) |

== See also ==
- List of automobile manufacturers
- List of German cars
- Auto Union
