= DKW Typ P =

DKW Typ P (1928-1931) DKW Typ PS 600-Sport (1929 - 1933)
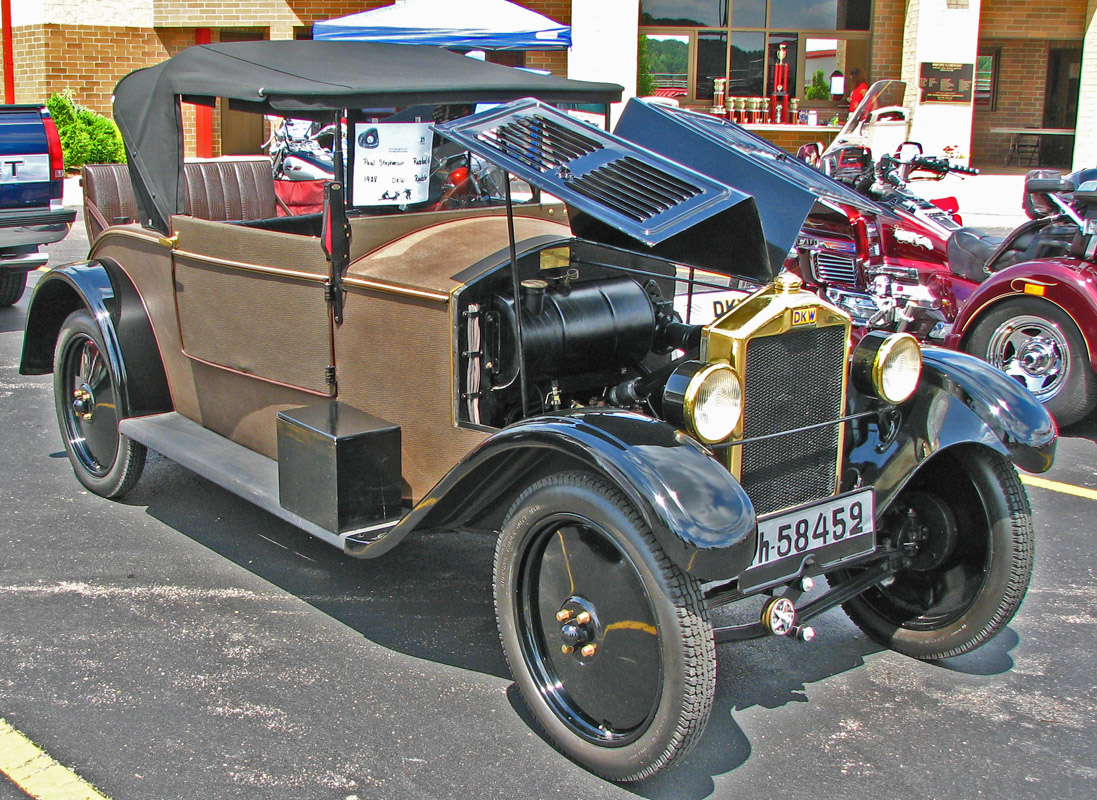
- 1928 DKW P15 Roadster

Overview
- Manufacturer: DKW
- Also called: DKW P15
- Production: Typ P: 1928–1931 4,728 units PS 600: 1929–1933 500 units
- Assembly: Spandau (Berlin), Germany
- Designer: Rudolf Slaby

Body and chassis
- Class: City Car
- Body style: Convertible, Roadster
- Layout: FMR layout

Powertrain
- Engine: 584 cc two stroke inline twin
- Transmission: 3-speed manual

Dimensions
- Wheelbase: Typ P: 2,590 mm (102 in); PS 600: 2,400 mm (94 in)
- Length: Typ P: 3,600 mm (140 in); PS 600: 3,700 mm (150 in)
- Width: Typ P: 1,350 mm (53 in); PS 600: 1,330 mm (52 in)
- Height: Typ P: 1,600 mm (63 in); 2-seaters Typ P: 1,700 mm (67 in); 3- and 4-seaters PS 600: 1,200 mm (47 in)

The DKW Typ P was the first motor car made by DKW. It was a light-weight design with a unit body made of wood and imitation leather. It was powered by a two stroke inline twin engine.

== Origins ==
The first Type P was ready on 7 May 1928. The model was developed by Rudolf Slaby, the former owner of the Spandau based automaker Slaby-Beringer which DKW had purchased in 1924.

== The Typ P Roadster / Cabriolet 1928 - 1931 ==
The original Typ P was made from 1928 to 1931 and was available as a convertible or a roadster. The engine produced 15 metric horsepower (11 kW) and the car was referred to as the DKW P15 as a result. Power was transmitted via a three speed manual gear box to the rear wheels. Even at this stage the mechanically operated foot brake worked on all four wheels: the handbrake operated on the front leftside wheel and on the rear rightside wheel.

== The Typ PS 600-Sport 1929 - 1933 ==
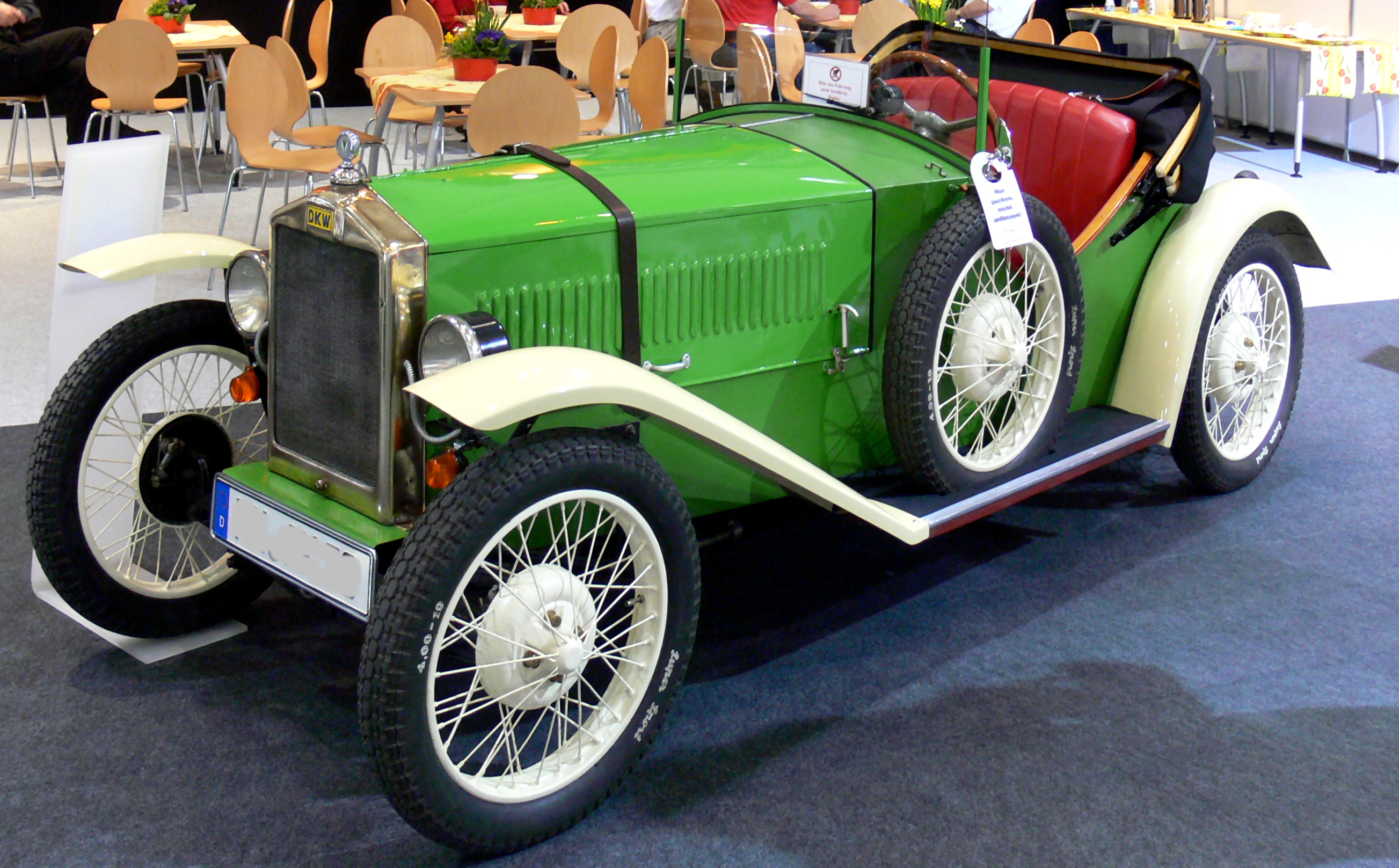
DKW PS 600 sports roadster

A reduced wheelbase sports roadster derivative, the PS 600, with an engine producing 18 metric horsepower (13 kW), was made from December 1929 till 1933. The contrast between the relatively long bonnet/hood and the small two cylinder engine hiding underneath it was excessive, but the car was visually appealing, being sportingly proportioned with a tapered "boat-deck" rear reminiscent of the racing cars of the time.

== Commercial ==
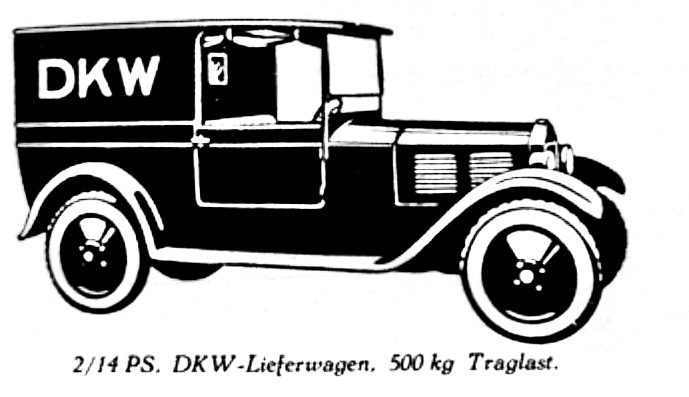
DKW 15 L 2/14 PS 0,5 t (1929)

The car drew criticism. Experts remarked on its primitive look and the "uncultivated" noise from the two-stroke engine. The "two-stroke" fuel mixture of gasoline/petrol with oil was expensive, and the Type P used a lot of it. It had a prodigious appetite for spark plugs. A relatively short operating life was anticipated also on account of the poor quality of the synthetic leather that coated the timber body frame: it rotted.

Astonishingly, with 5,228 produced, DKW's first car nevertheless found many customers. DKW was by this time Germany's leading motorbike producer: most buyers of the first DKW car were upgrading from motorbikes, and were accordingly already inured to the peculiarities of the two-stroke engine.

In 1929, only a few delivery vehicles with a payload of 400 to 500 kg were produced.

== Succession ==
After production of the Typ P Roadster/Cabriolet came to an end, its place on the Spandau production line was taken by the Typ PS-600 Sport, while a class up the plant concentrated increasingly on the 988cc Typ 4=8.

In terms of market positioning, the real successor of the original Typ P was the DKW F1, the innovative front wheel drive model launched in February 1931 and produced 300 km (190 miles) to the south at the Zwickau plant acquired in 1928 with the purchase of Audi.
