= Wanderer W22 =

Wanderer W22 (1933–1935) Wanderer W240 (1935–1936) Wanderer W40 (1936–1938)
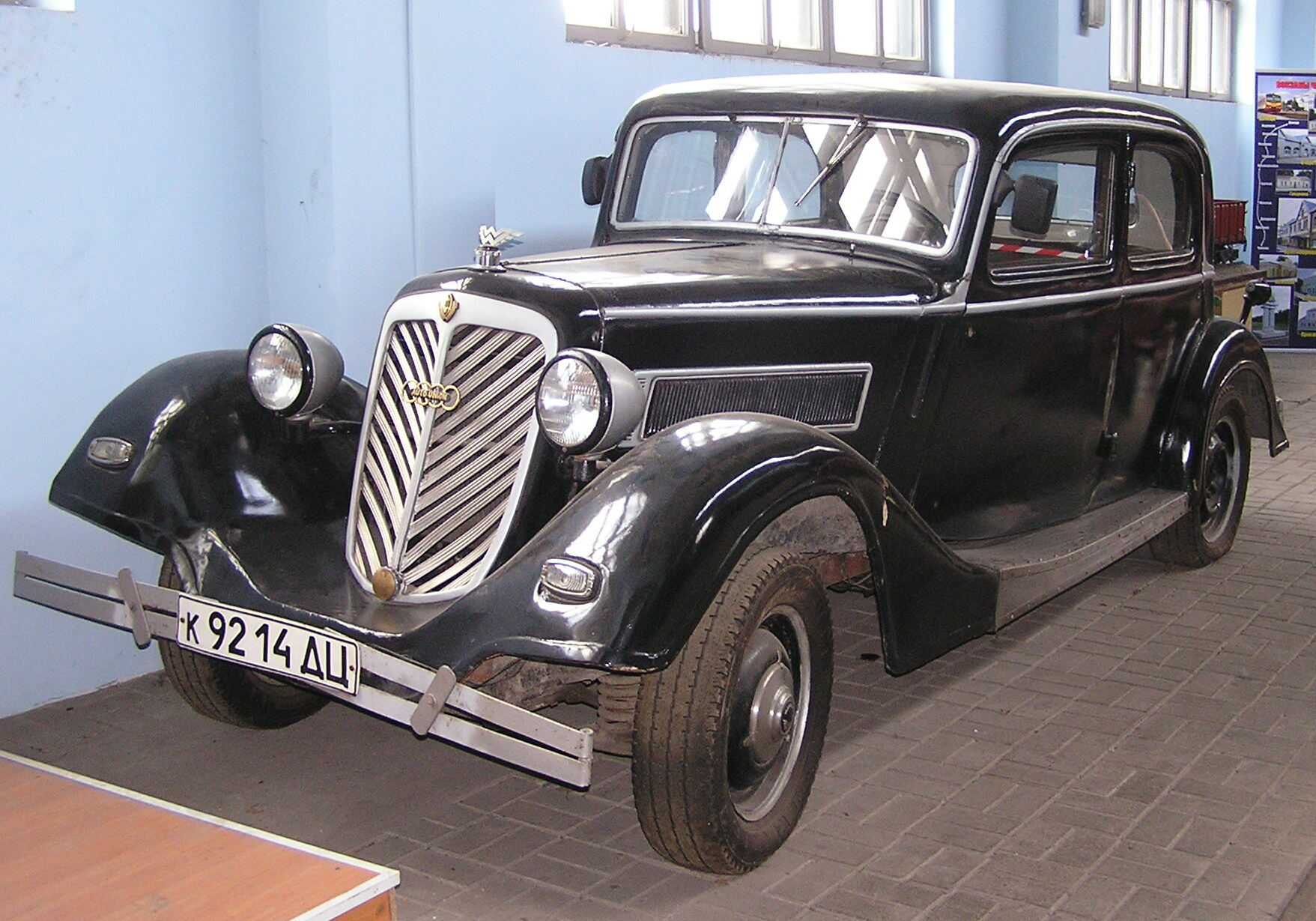
- Wanderer W240 in the Donetsk Railway Museum

Overview
- Manufacturer: Auto Union
- Production: 1933 – 1938
- Assembly: Siegmar, Germany

Body and chassis
- Class: Obere Mittelklasse
- Related: Audi Front

Powertrain
- Engine: 1,950 cc ohv Straight six
- Transmission: 4-speed manual with floor-mounted shift

Dimensions
- Wheelbase: 3,000 mm (120 in)
- Length: 4,500 mm (180 in)
- Width: 1,670 mm (66 in)
- Height: 1,650 mm (65 in)

The Wanderer W22 was an upper-middle-class six-cylinder sedan introduced by Auto Union under the Wanderer brand in 1933. It replaced the W20 8/40 PS, from which it inherited its OHV engine, developed by Ferdinand Porsche.

Two years after introduction, in 1935, the car was renamed as the Wanderer W240, and in 1936 it was renamed again as the Wanderer W40. The engine and principal mechanical components remained very little changed throughout, however, as did the wheelbase and other principal chassis measurements. The car therefore was, and generally still is, regarded as a single model despite the name changes.

At launch the W22 differed from its predecessor most notably on account of its swing rear axle, supported by lateral leaf springing, adopting a pattern established by Ferdinand Porsche during his time with the (at the time still independent) Austrian Steyr company. Another new feature in the W22 was the hydraulic braking system.

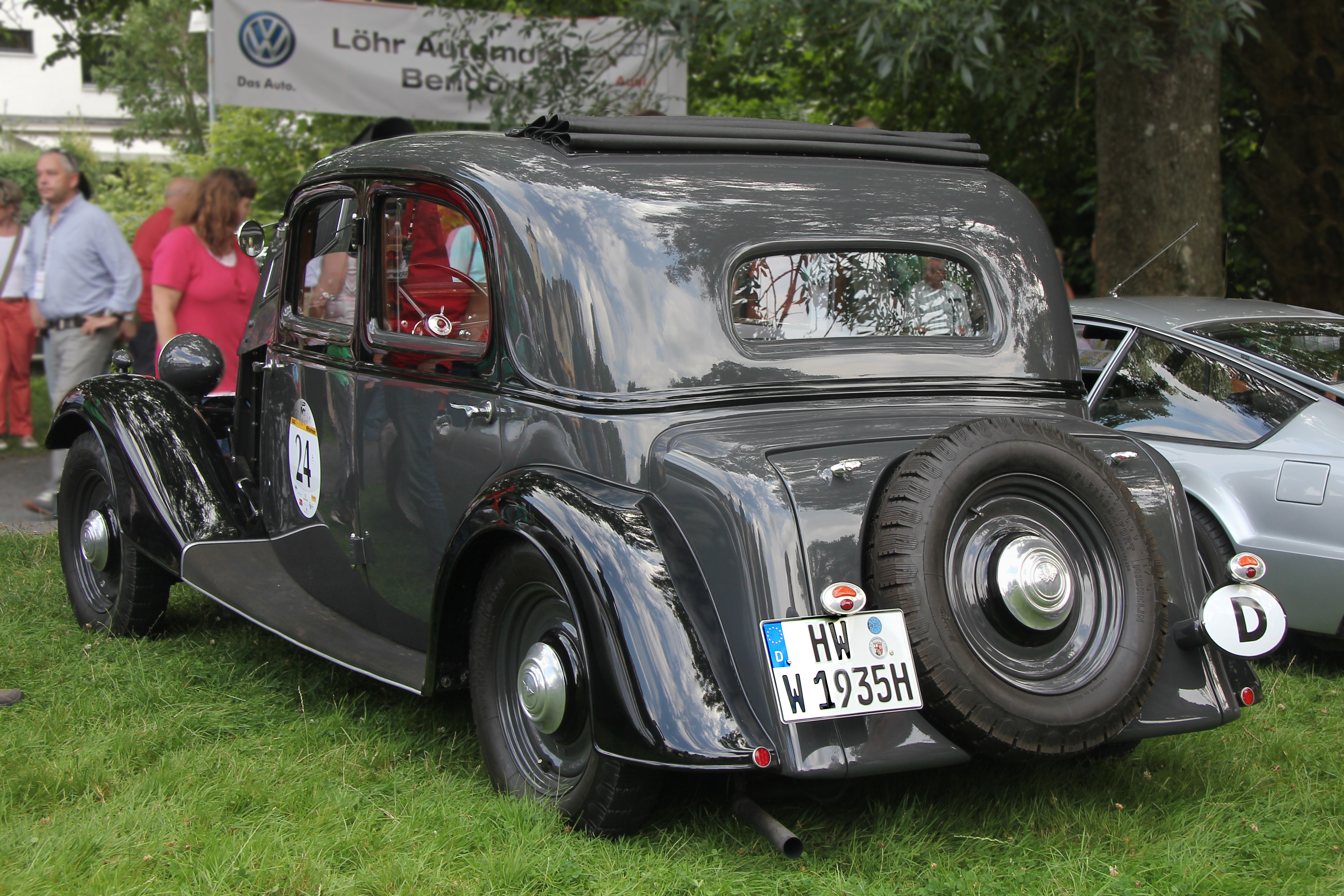
1935 Wanderer W240

The car was powered by a six-cylinder four-stroke ohv engine of 1950 cc driving the rear wheels via a four-speed gearbox. This was the same engine which was installed (albeit turned around with its drive shaft facing the front of the car) in the innovative Audi Front which was launched at the same time. As on the Audi, claimed maximum power output was 40 PS (29 kW; 39 hp) at 3,500 rpm. However, whereas the Audi received the larger engine from the new Wanderer 245 in 1935, the Wanderer W22/W240/W40 retained the same 1950 cc engine throughout its life.

Initially the car was offered as a “six-light” (six side window) four-door saloon and as a two-door cabriolet. Additional configurations were offered a year later including a commodious six-seat “Pullman-limousine”.

The 1935 name change from W22 to W240 coincided with the introduction of a four-door saloon with just two principal side windows on each side. With this body the Wanderer W240 appeared streamlined beside the conservatively styled contemporary Mercedes-Benz sedans. It more closely resembled a chunkier version of the Citroën Traction introduced in France late in 1933. At the same time the cabriolet version was modified, losing its rear side windows in favour of a more extensive hood. The “Pullman-limousine” continued to be offered.

There were no significant changes to the car accompanying the 1936 name change to Wanderer W40.

The Wanderer W22/W240/W40 shared its 3,000-millimetre (120 in) wheelbase with the six-cylinder 1690 cc W21/W235/W35 and, after 1935, the six-cylinder 2257 cc W245/W250/W45/W50 models. Taking all the 3-metre wheelbase models together, 29,111 of these six-cylinder Wanderers were produced between 1933 and 1938.

Auto Union did not directly replace their W22/W240/W40. However, the larger-engined six-cylinder models were effectively replaced by the Wanderer W23, which appeared in 1937.
