= Wanderer W24 =

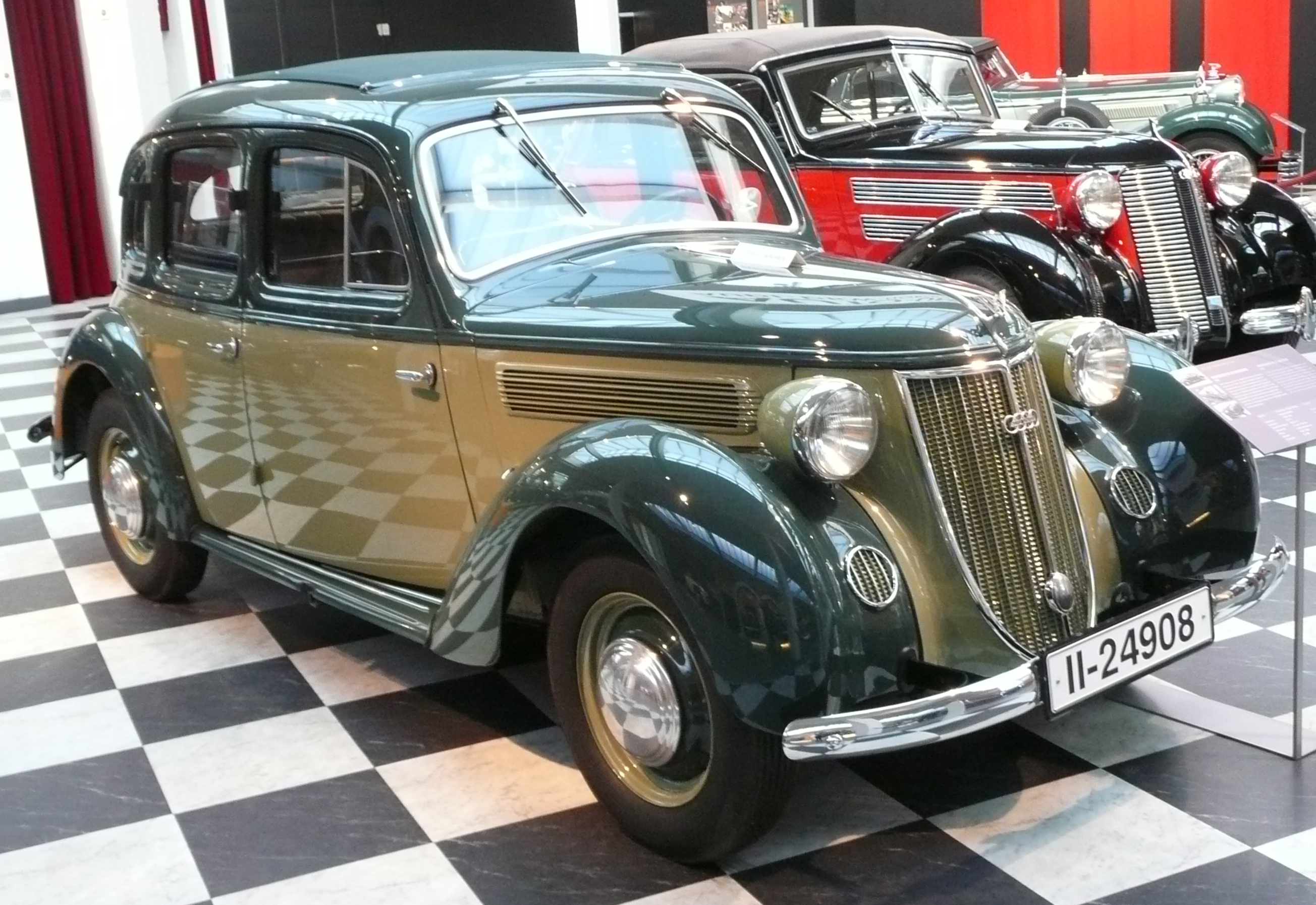
- 1937 Wanderer W24 Limousine in the August Horch Museum Zwickau

Overview
- Manufacturer: Auto Union
- Production: 1937 – 1940
- Assembly: Siegmar, Germany

Powertrain
- Engine: 1767 cc four-stroke inline-four
- Transmission: 4-speed manual with floor-mounted shift

Dimensions
- Wheelbase: 2,600–3,100 mm (100–120 in)
- Length: 4,300 mm (170 in)
- Width: 1,615 mm (63.6 in)
- Height: 1,650 mm (65 in)

The Wanderer W24 is a middle market car introduced by Auto Union under the Wanderer brand in 1937. The car was powered by a four-cylinder four-stroke engine of 1767 cc driving the rear wheels via a four-speed gear box. Claimed maximum power output of four cylinder flathead engine was 42 PS (31 kW; 41 hp) achieved at 3,400 rpm.

The W24's structural basis was a box frame chassis. At the back it employed a swing axle arrangement copied from the popular small cars produced by sister brand DKW of Auto Union.

At a time when some of the manufacturer's larger models featured a twelve-volt electrical system, the W24 still made do with a six-volt arrangement. The car was offered as a four-seater saloon with two or four doors. In addition, approximately 300 cabriolet versions were produced. Today, few of these cabriolet versions survive: those that do are prized by collectors.

By 1940 when the increasing intensity of the war enforced an end to passenger car production, approximately 23,000 Wanderer W24s had been produced. A model belonged to Sisir Kumar Bose, the nephew of Indian nationalist Netaji Subhas Chandra Bose. Subhas Chandra Bose escaped from home arrest riding this car making his way for Germany.

== Gallery ==
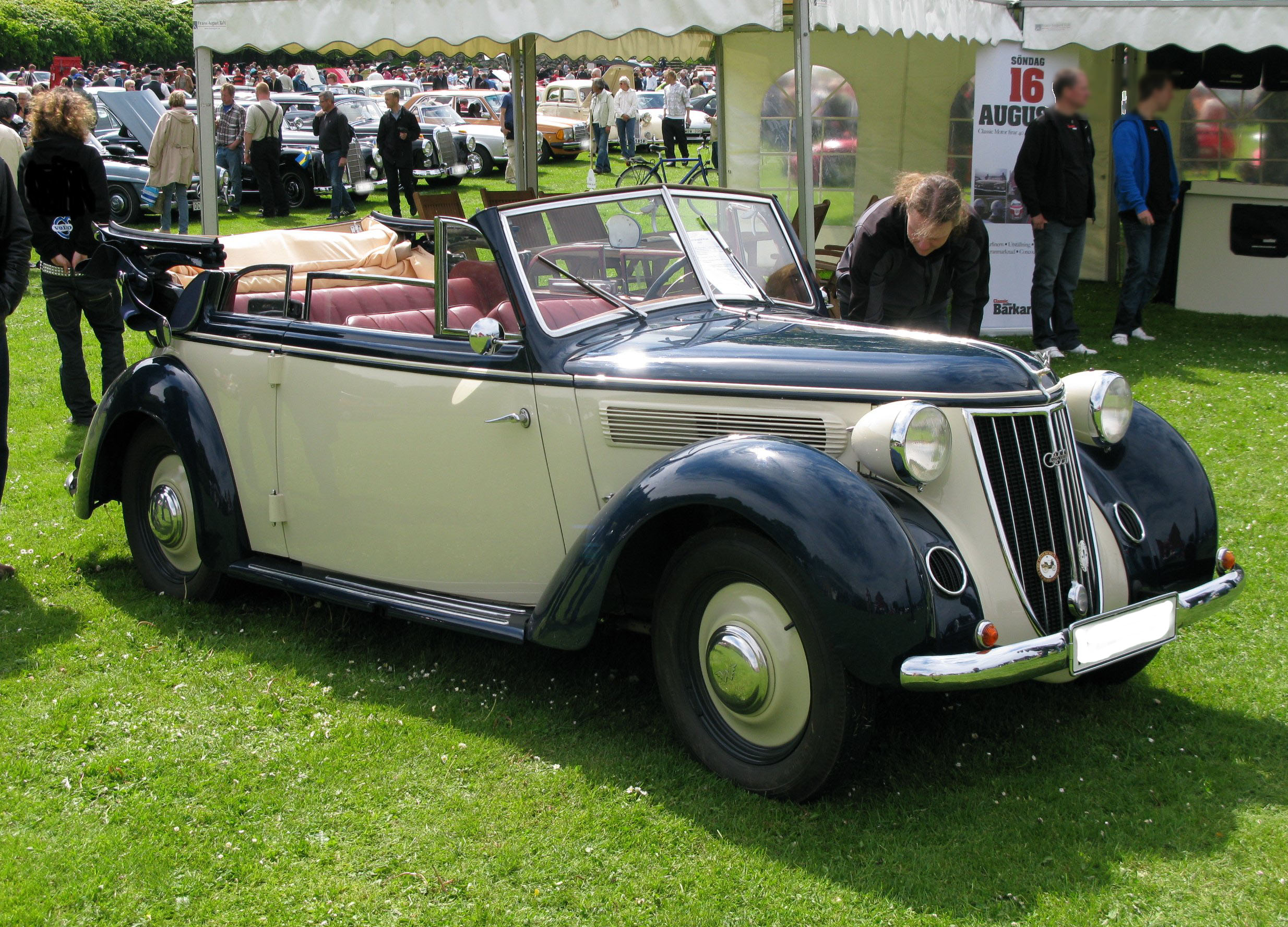
1937 Wanderer W24 Cabriolet

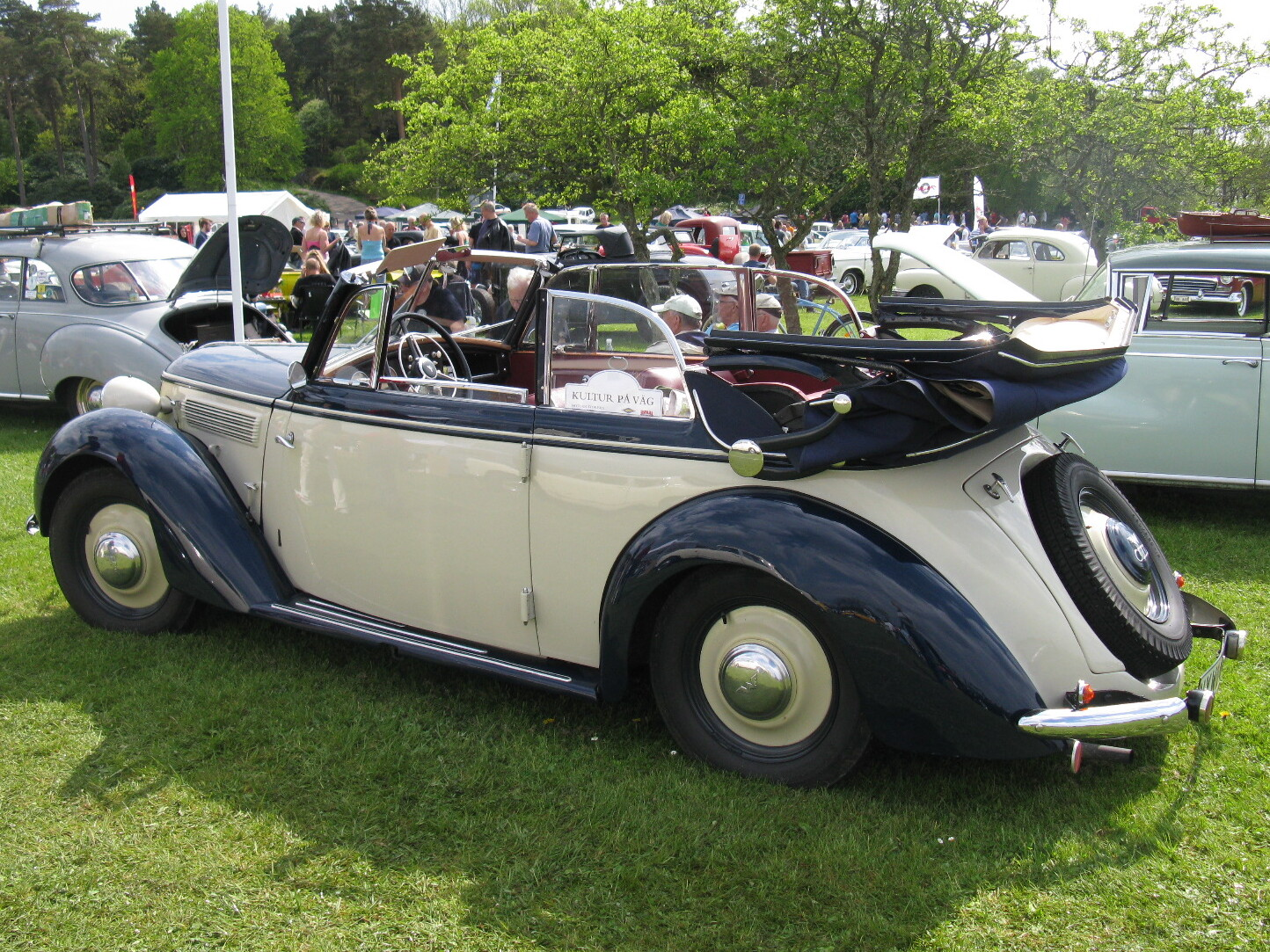
1937 Wanderer W24 Cabriolet rear

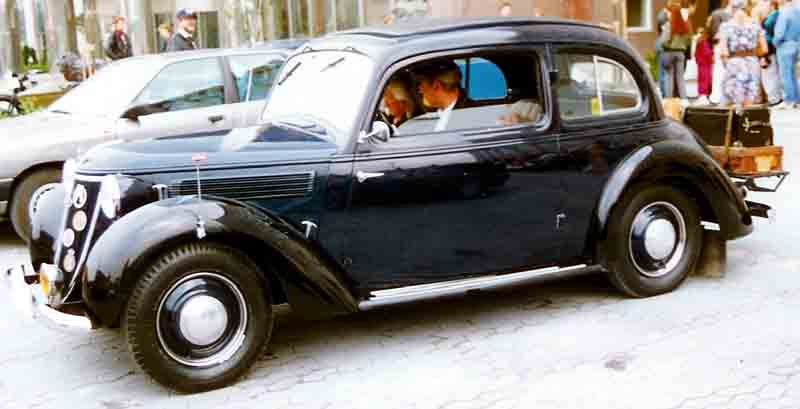
1939 Wanderer W24
