= Horch 830 =

Horch Type 600/670
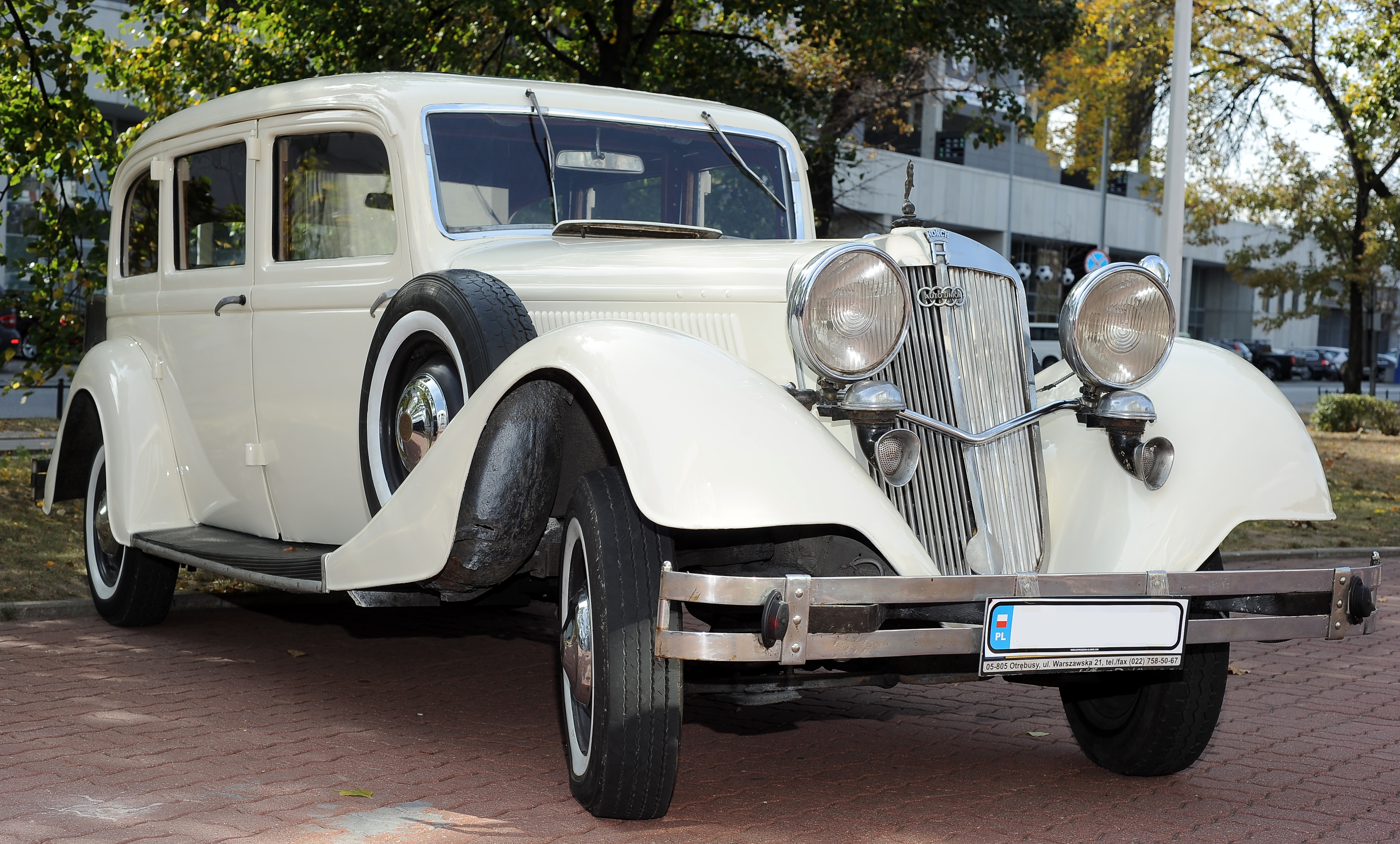
- A 1938 model of the Horch 830.

Overview
- Manufacturer: Horch
- Production: 1933–1940 produced
- Assembly: Zwickau, Germany

Body and chassis
- Class: Full-size luxury car (F)
- Body style: roadster, limousine and cabriolet (each with 2-door or 4-door options)
- Layout: FR layout

Powertrain
- Engine: 3.0 L sv V8; 3.25 L sv V8; 3.5 L sv V8; 3.8 L sv V8
- Transmission: 4-speed manual /optional overdrive

Dimensions
- Wheelbase: 3,200 mm (126 in); 3,350 mm (132 in)

Chronology
- Predecessor: Horch 12

The Horch 830 is an eight-cylinder luxury car produced by the German manufacturer Horch from 1933 to 1940. This model featured rear-wheel drive and was mainly offered in roadster, limousine and cabriolet styles. At least 11,000 units had been built in the Horch factory at Zwickau before World War II. Afterwards, modified models of the Horch 830 were used as staff cars and utility vehicles by the Wehrmacht.

== History ==
The Horch 830 was first introduced in 1933 at the International Motor Show Germany in Berlin. It was intended to act as the successor to its V12-powered predecessor, the Horch 8. The car was also developed under Auto Union, which had merged Horch together with manufacturers Audi, DKW, and Wanderer in 1932. Between 1933 and 1940, at least 11,000 units were produced at the Horch factory in Zwickau, until the outbreak of World War II caused production to cease completely. It was the first Horch to be fitted with a transverse leaf spring suspension. For 1935 the 830B was later joined by the long wheelbase 830BL ("L" for lang); during 1935 the name of the shorter version was changed to 830 Bk ("k" for kurz).

In January 1937, the Bk was replaced by the 930 V ("V" for verkürzt), which sat on a shorter yet wheelbase. Both this and the 830 BL also benefitted from increased power thanks to twin, side draft carburettors and a somewhat higher compression ratio. The 930 V also received new, more aerodynamic bodywork. In September 1938 the engine was enlarged again, a longer stroke providing 3.8 litres of displacement; the engine was fitted with two Solex carburettors.

Some models of the Horch 830 were given to the Wehrmacht for use as military light utility vehicles and staff cars with a similar purpose to the Kübelwagen. These models had been extensively modified and fitted with off-road tyres as well as a new suspension system with rigid axles at the front and rear to allow the car to be used for off-road activities.

== Specifications ==
The Horch 830 was released in the roadster, limousine and cabriolet styles, with convertible roof versions available as well as 2-door and 4-door variants for each model type. It featured rear-wheel drive with a four-speed, fully synchronized transmission, and was fitted with a flathead, 66-degree V8 engine – unlike its predecessor the Horch 12, which had a V12 engine.

=== Technical data ===
	830	830 B	830 BL	830 Bk	930 V	830 BL	930 V	830 BL
Model year(s)	1933–1934	1935	1935–1936	1936	1937–1938		1938–1940	
Engine	Side valve V8							
Bore × Stroke	75 mm × 85 mm (2.95 in × 3.35 in)	78 mm × 85 mm (3.07 in × 3.35 in)	78 mm × 92 mm (3.07 in × 3.62 in)				78 mm × 100 mm (3.07 in × 3.94 in)	
Displacement	3,004 cc (183.3 cu in)	3,250 cc (198.3 cu in)	3,517 cc (214.6 cu in)				3,823 cc (233.3 cu in)	
Maximum power	70 PS (51 kW)		75 PS (55 kW) at 3600 rpm		82 PS (60 kW)		92 PS (68 kW) at 3200 rpm	
Top speed	110–115 km/h (68–71 mph)	115 km/h (71 mph)		120 km/h (75 mph)	125 km/h (78 mph)	120 km/h (75 mph)	130 km/h (81 mph)	125 km/h (78 mph)
Curb weight	1,650–1,730 kg (3,638–3,814 lb)	1,650 kg (3,638 lb)	1,950 kg (4,299 lb)	1,840 kg (4,057 lb)	1,900 kg (4,189 lb)	2,030 kg (4,475 lb)	1,960 kg (4,321 lb)	2,100 kg (4,630 lb)
Length	4,750 mm (187.0 in)		5,050 mm (198.8 in)	4,750 mm (187.0 in)	4,920 mm (193.7 in)	5,050 mm (198.8 in)	4,920 mm (193.7 in)	5,050 mm (198.8 in)
Width	1,780 mm (70.1 in)			1,680 mm (66.1 in)	1,790 mm (70.5 in)	1,780 mm (70.1 in)	1,790 mm (70.5 in)	1,780 mm (70.1 in)
Height	1,600–1,650 mm (63.0–65.0 in)	1,600 mm (63.0 in)	1,650 mm (65.0 in)	1,600 mm (63.0 in)	1,625 mm (64.0 in)	1,650 mm (65.0 in)	1,625 mm (64.0 in)	1,650 mm (65.0 in)
Wheelbase	3,200 mm (126.0 in)		3,350 mm (131.9 in)	3,200 mm (126.0 in)	3,100 mm (122.0 in)	3,350 mm (131.9 in)	3,100 mm (122.0 in)	3,350 mm (131.9 in)
Track front/rear	1,440 / 1,470 mm (56.7 / 57.9 in)		1,440 / 1,500 mm (56.7 / 59.1 in)	1,440 / 1,470 mm (56.7 / 57.9 in)		1,440 / 1,500 mm (56.7 / 59.1 in)	1,440 / 1,470 mm (56.7 / 57.9 in)	1,440 / 1,500 mm (56.7 / 59.1 in)
Turning circle	12 m (39 ft; 472 in)		13.5 m (44 ft; 531 in)	12 m (39 ft; 472 in)	11.5 m (38 ft; 453 in)	13.5 m (44 ft; 531 in)	11.5 m (38 ft; 453 in)	13.5 m (44 ft; 531 in)

== In popular culture ==
- A Horch 830 cabriolet was famously driven by Charles de Gaulle after World War II until his election to the presidency in 1959. This cabriolet was reportedly captured from the Wehrmacht forces of Dietrich von Choltitz. It is now on display at the Military History Museum in Dresden, complete with a French flag.

== Gallery ==
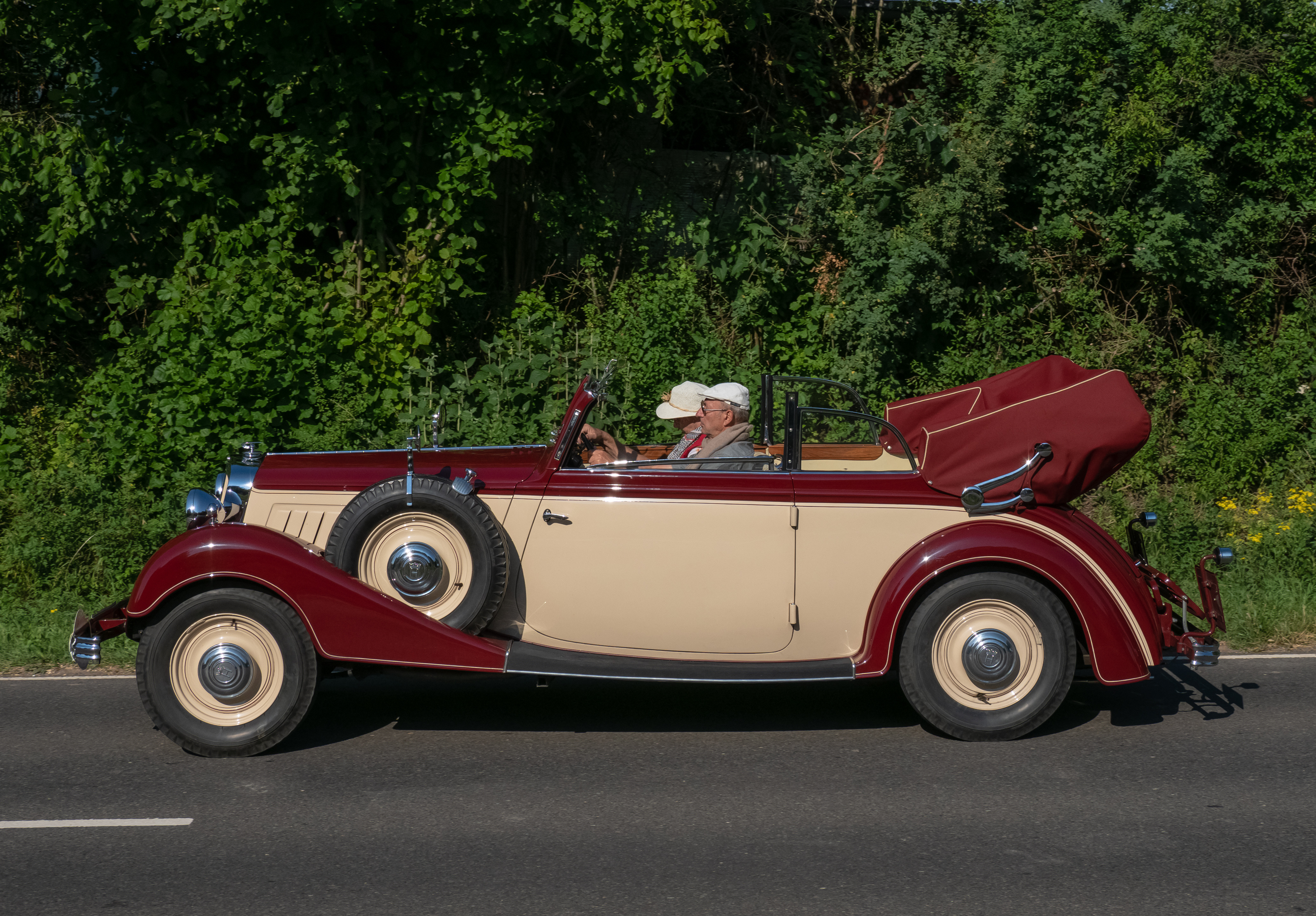
1933 Horch 830 Sport Cabriolet

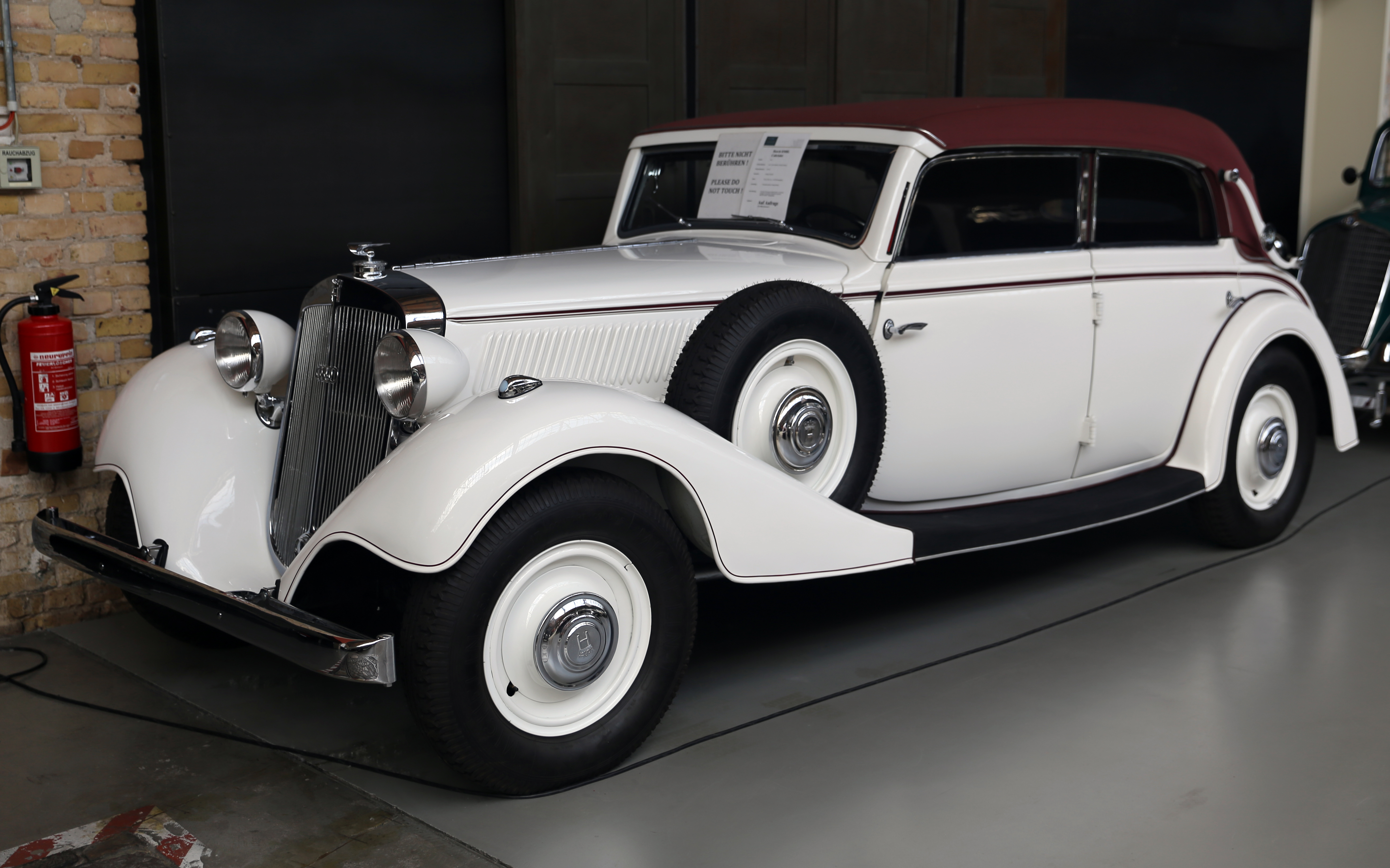
1936 Horch 830BL Cabriolet

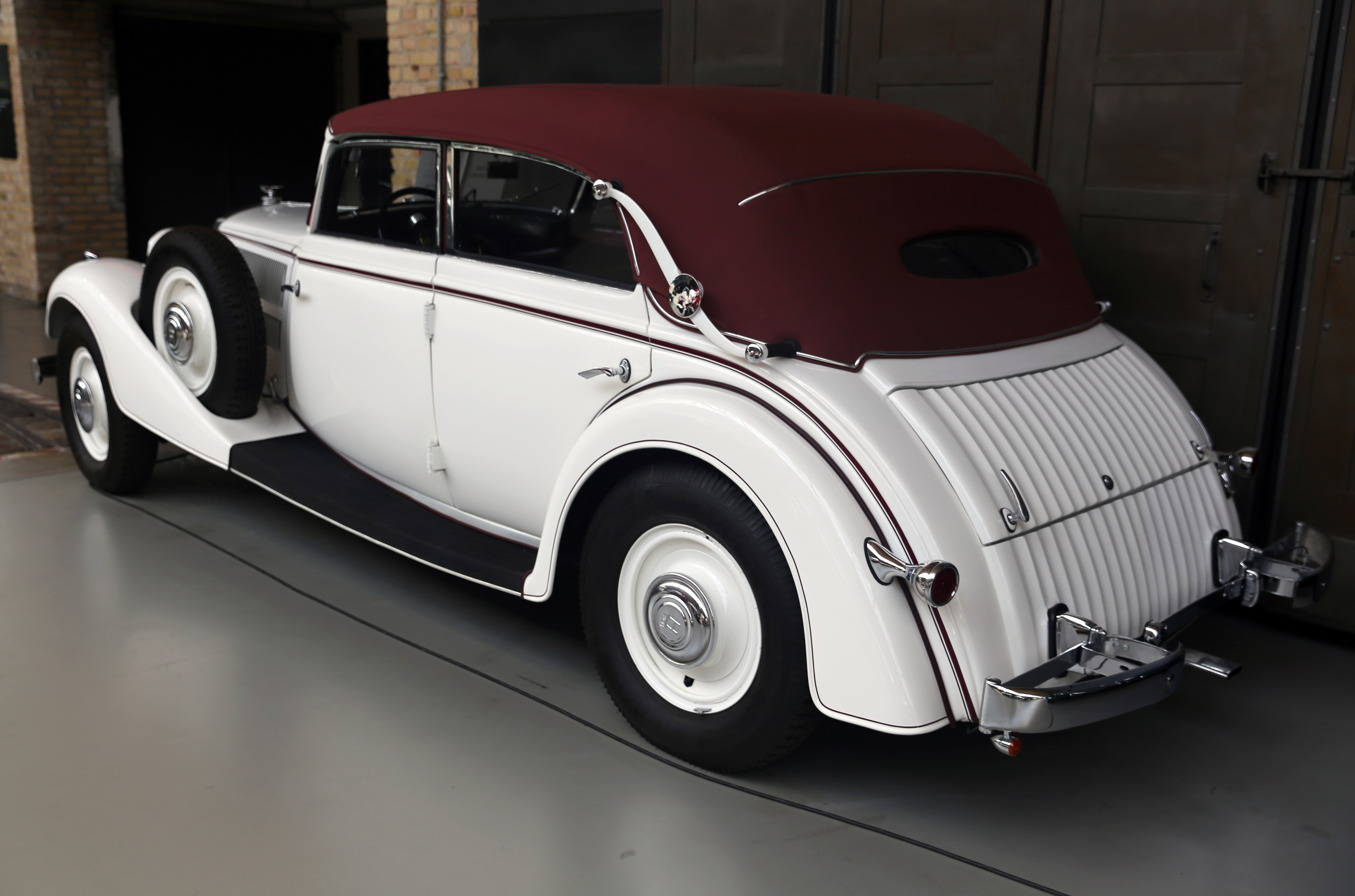
1936 Horch 830BL Cabriolet

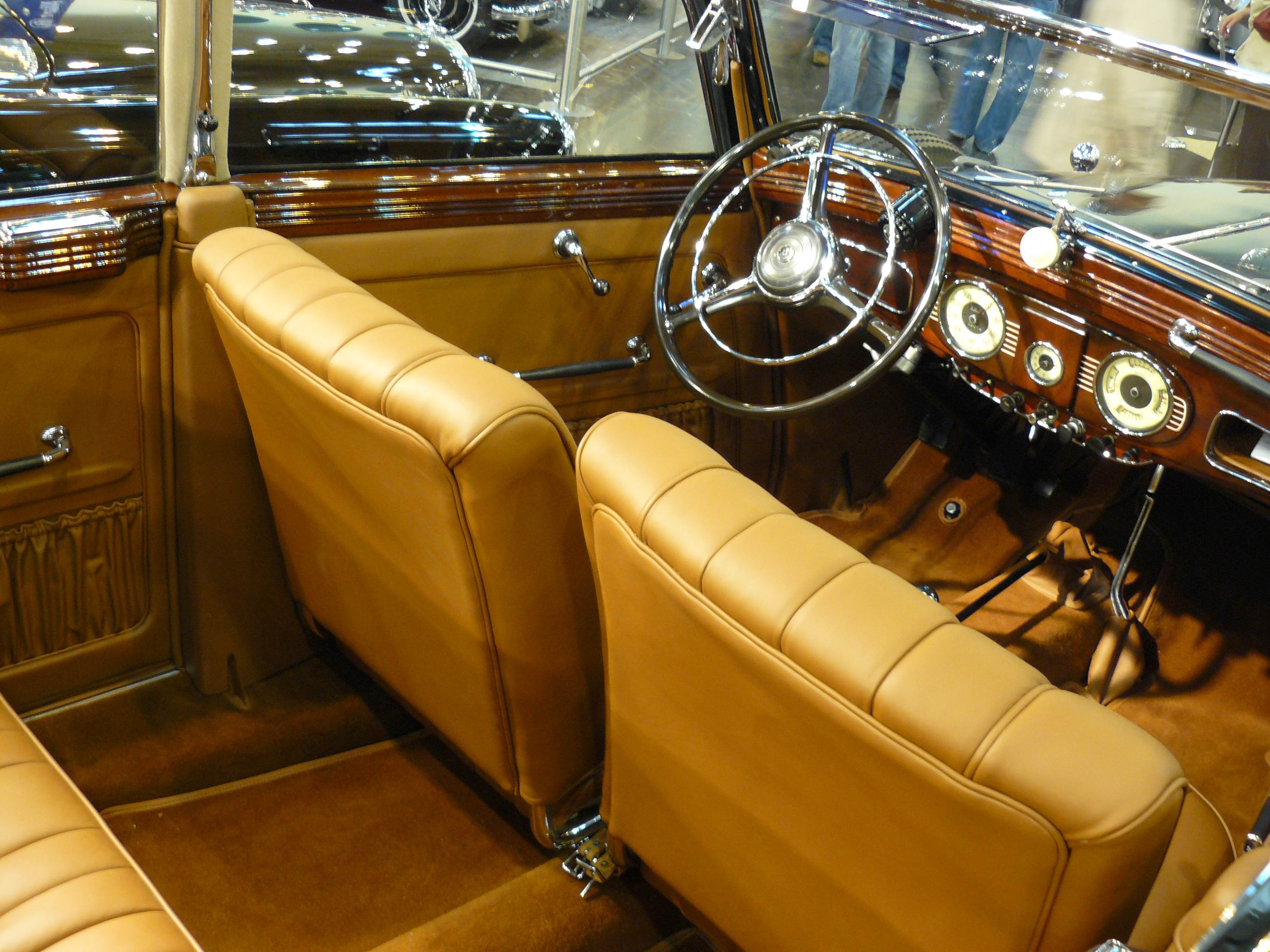
Horch 830 interior

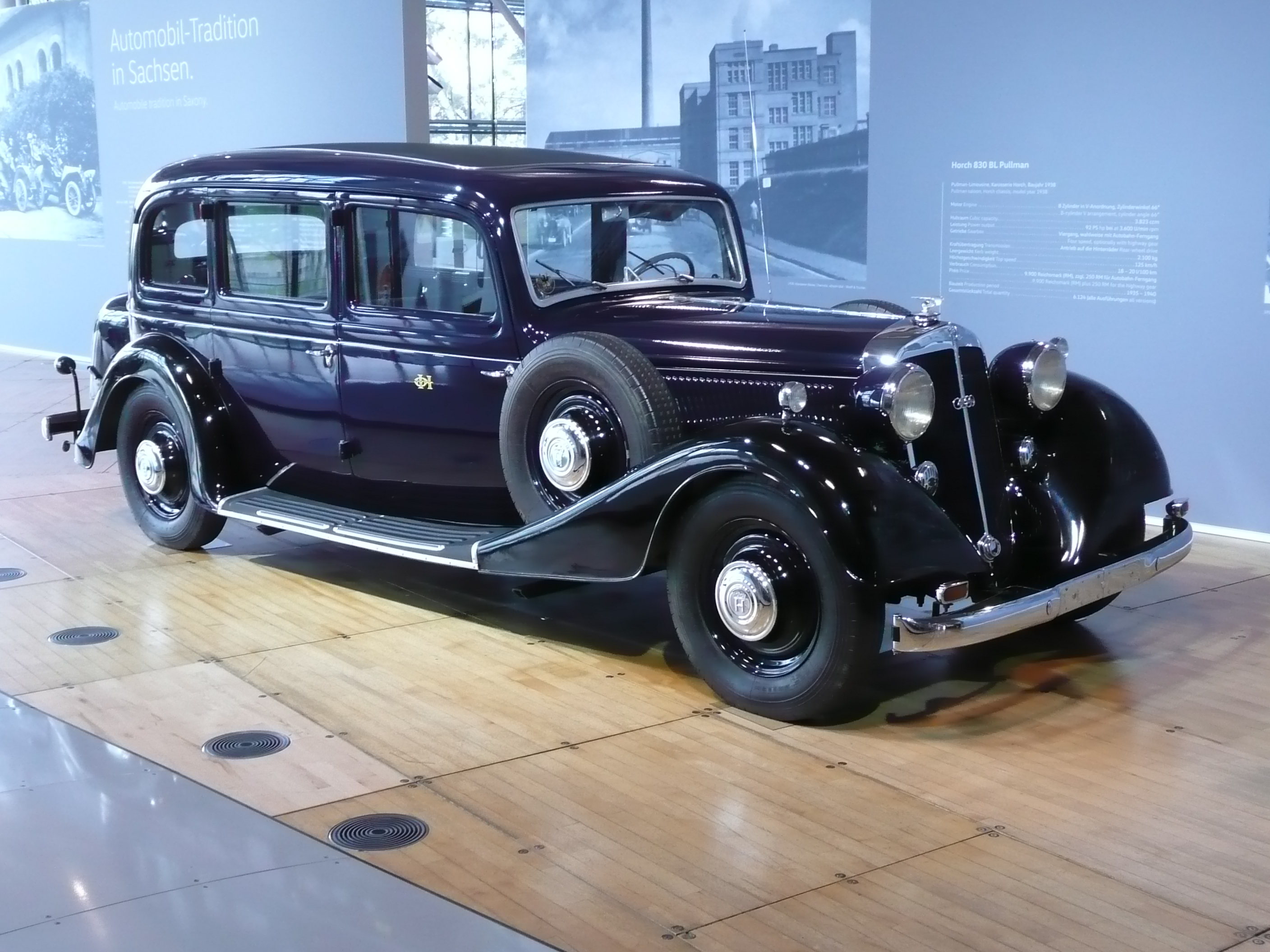
Horch 830BL Pullmann

== See also ==
- List of German cars
