= Horch 10 =

The Horch 10 M 20 is a car that was brought to the market in 1922 by the Horch company in Zwickau. The construction was made by Arnold Zoller from Argus Motoren in Berlin. Their owner Moritz Straus held in the early 1920s, the majority of the shares of the Horch company.

The vehicle had a front-mounted 4-cylinder inline engine with flathead engine and 1.6 liters capacity. It developed 35 hp at 2000/min. The rear wheels were driven over a 4-speed gearbox with shift lever in the center of the car. The car with U-profile frame had leaf-sprung rigid axles and was as four-seater touring car or city-coupe available.

== Facelift ==
In July 1923, Paul Daimler became chief designer at Argus and revised the engine. He constructed a valve train overhead camshaft that was driven by a Königswelle (master shaft). With these changes the engine gave 50 hp at 2800/min. The carriage from 1924 offered called Horch 10 M 25, was the first German car with four-wheel brakes and was delivered only with six seats. Until 1926 originated about 2300 pieces.

== Technical data ==
Type	10 M 20 (10/35 PS)	10 M 25 (10/50 PS)
Production period	1922–1924	1924–1926
Bodies	T4, Cp4	T6, L4, PL4, Cb4
Engine	4 cylinders in line 4-stroke	4 cylinders in line 4-stroke
Valves	standing (sv)	overhead camshaft (ohc) with vertical shaft drive
Bore × stroke	80 mm × 130 mm	80 mm × 130 mm
Capacity	2612 cm^{3}	2612 cm^{3}
Power (PS)	35	50
Power (kW)	25.7	37
Consumption	15 L/100 km	15 L/100 km
Maximum speed	80 km/h	95 km/h
Weight	1,300 kg	1,870–2,150 kg
Max weight	1900 kg	2,320–2,600 kg
Electric equipment	12 Volt	12 Volt
Length	4.55 m	4.50 m
Width	1.60 m	1.73 m
Height	2.25 m	2.00 m
Wheelbase	3220 mm	3300 mm
Track front/rear	1380 mm/1380 mm	1420 mm/1420 mm
Turning circle		

== Models ==
- T4 = 4-seats Touring car
- T6 = 6-seats Touring car
- L4 = 4-doors Sedan
- PL4 = 4-doors Pullman-Sedan
- Cp4 = 4-doors Town-Coupé
- Cb4 = 4-doors Coupé-Convertible
