= August Horch =

German automobile engineer, founder of Audi

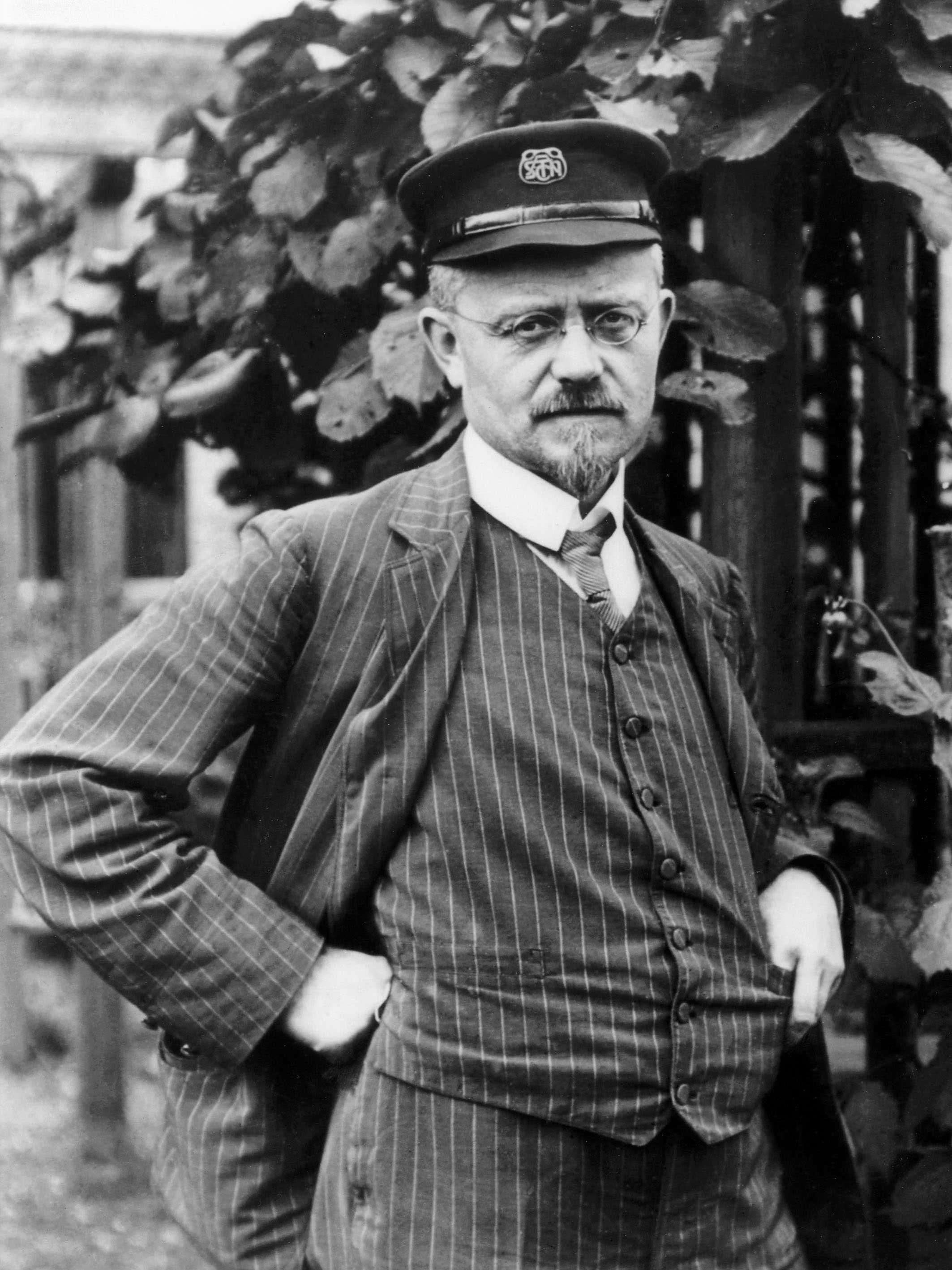
- Horch in 1906
- Born: 12 October 1868; Winningen, Rhenish Prussia
- Died: 3 February 1951 (aged 82); Münchberg, Bavaria, West Germany
- Known for: Founder of Audi and Horch

August Horch (12 October 1868 – 3 February 1951) was a German engineer and automobile pioneer, the founder of the manufacturing giant that eventually became Audi.

== Beginnings ==
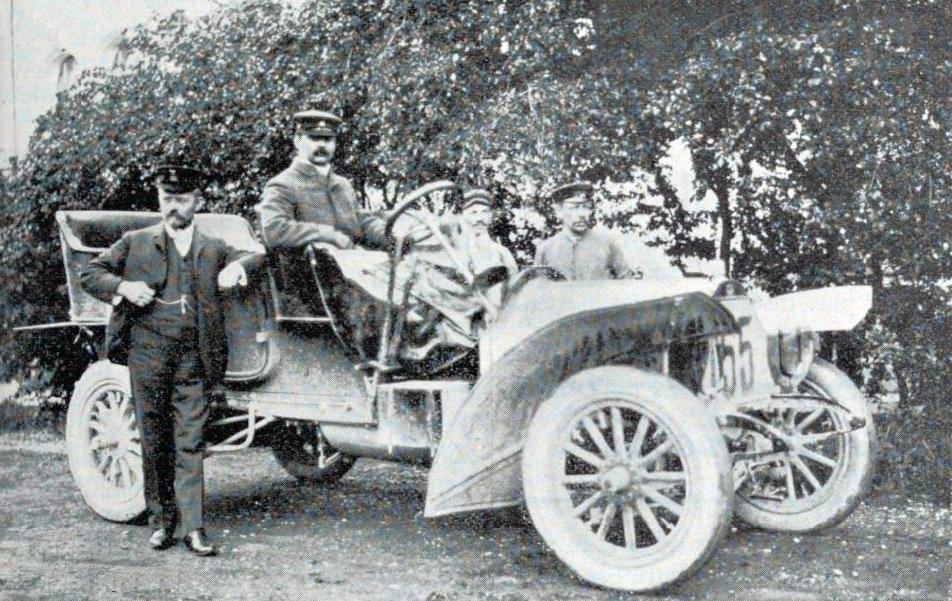
1906 Horch, which Rudolf Stoess drove to victory in the Herkomer Trial

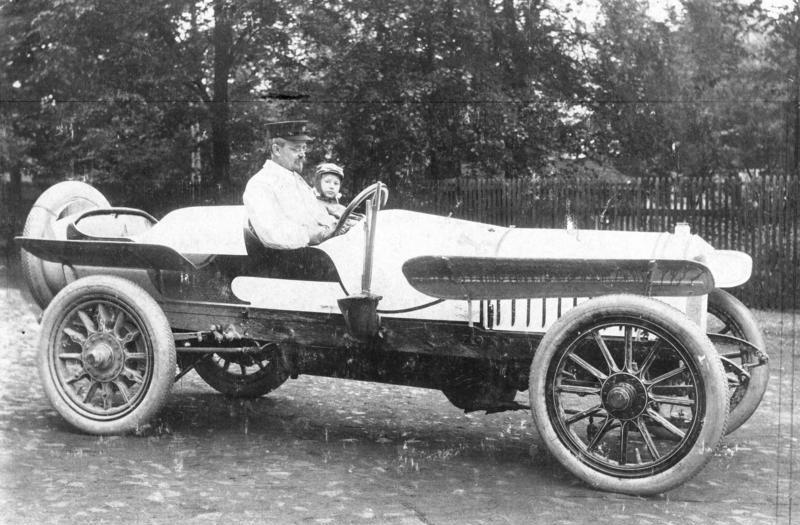
August Horch in a Horch automobile, 1908

Horch was born in Winningen, Rhenish Prussia. His initial trade was as a blacksmith, and then was educated at Hochschule Mittweida (Mittweida Technical College). After receiving a degree in engineering, he worked in shipbuilding. Horch worked for Karl Benz from 1896, before founding A. Horch & Co. in November 1899, in Ehrenfeld, Cologne, Germany.

== Manufacturing ==
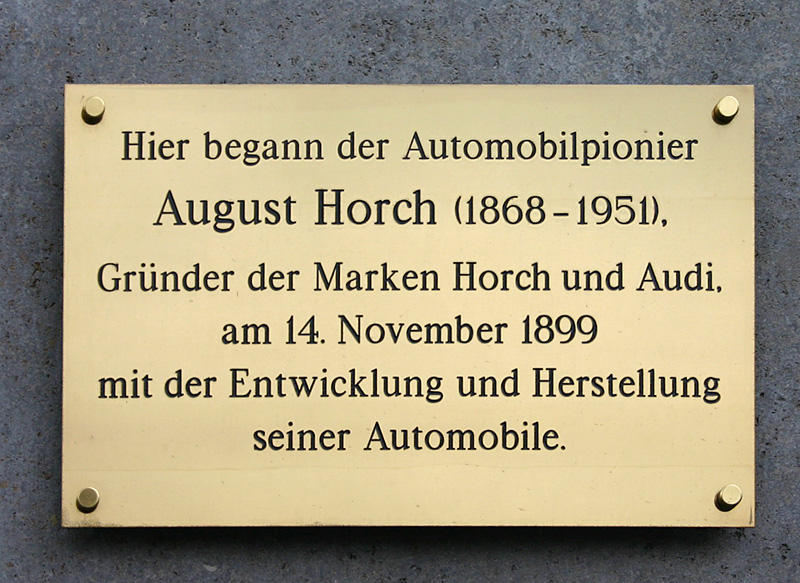
Memorial plate in Cologne, Germany

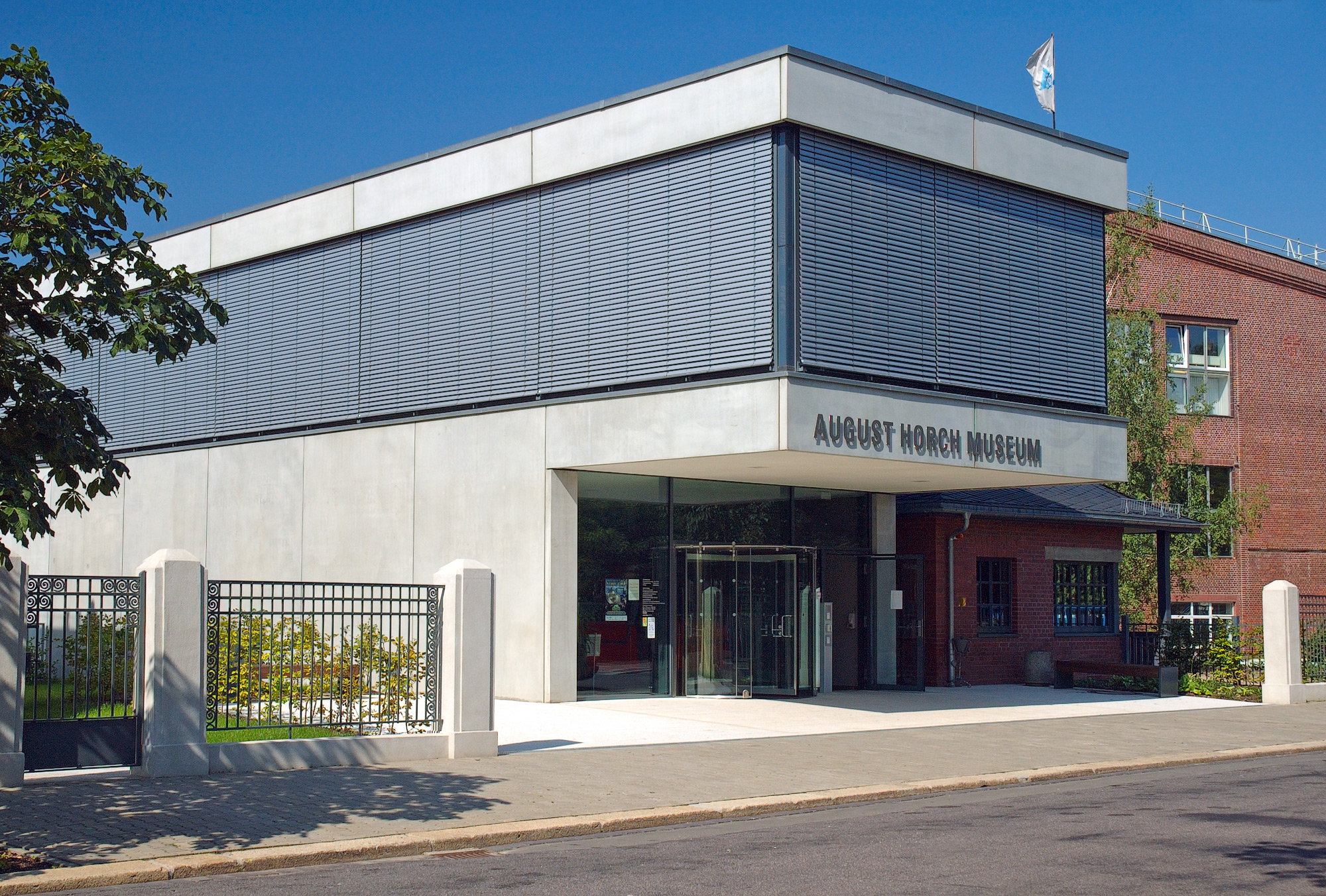
August Horch Museum Zwickau

The first Horch automobile was built in 1901. The company moved to Reichenbach in 1902 and Zwickau in 1904. Horch left the company in 1909 after a dispute, and set up in competition in Zwickau. His new firm was initially called Horch Automobil-Werke GmbH, but following a legal dispute over the Horch name, he decided to make another automobile company. (The court decided that Horch was a registered trademark on behalf of August's former partners and August was not entitled to use it any more). Consequently, Horch named his new company Audi Automobilwerke GmbH in 1910, Audi being the Latinization of Horch.

== Post Audi ==
Horch left Audi in 1920 and went to Berlin and took various jobs. He published his autobiography, I Built Cars (Ich Baute Autos) in 1937. He also served on the board of Auto Union, the successor to Audi Automobilwerke GmbH he had founded. Horch remained an honorary executive at Auto Union during and after its reincorporation in Ingolstadt, Bavaria, in the late 1940s until his death in 1951, ultimately not living to see the later resurrection of his Audi brand a decade later under the ownership of Volkswagen.

He was an honorary citizen of Zwickau and had a street named for his Audi cars in both Zwickau and his birthplace Winningen. He was made an honorary professor at Braunschweig University of Technology. There is an August Horchstrasse (August Horch Street) at Audi's main manufacturing plant in Ingolstadt.
