= Horch =

Defunct German car brand

Horch AG
- Industry: Automotive
- Founded: 1904
- Defunct: 1932; 1959
- Fate: merged with DKW, Wanderer, and Audi to form Auto Union
- Successor: Auto Union (1932–1969); Audi NSU Auto Union (1969–1985); Audi AG (1985–present)
- Headquarters: Zwickau, Saxony, Germany
- Key people: August Horch, founder
- Products: Luxury cars
- Number of employees: 250 (1904)

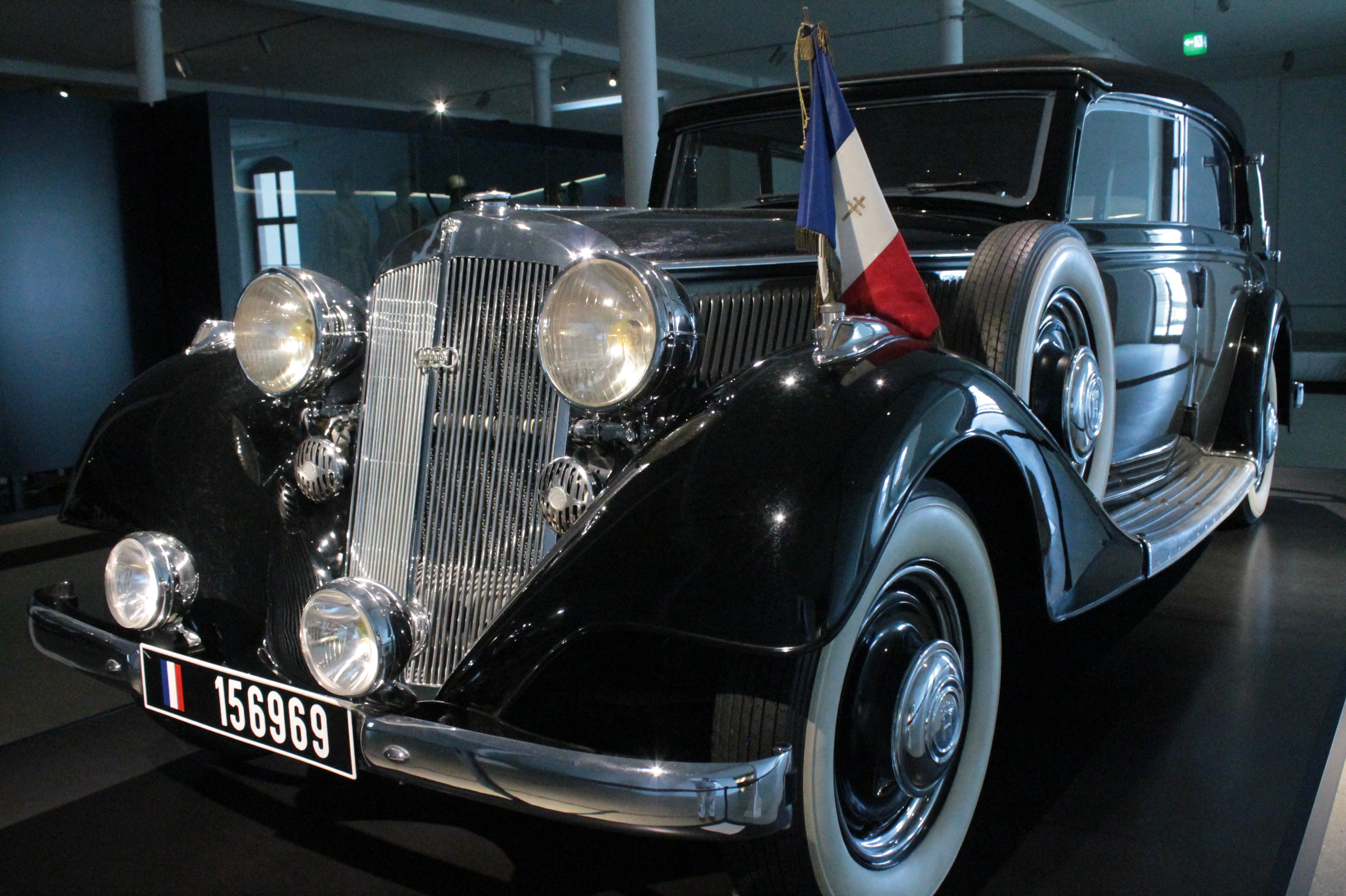
Charles de Gaulle's 1936 Horch 830 BL convertible, Bundeswehr Military History Museum, Dresden

Horch (German pronunciation: [hɔʁç]) was a German car manufacturer, which traced its roots to several companies founded in the late 19th and early 20th century by August Horch.

It is one of the predecessors of the present day Audi company, which itself resulted from the merger of Auto Union Aktiengesellschaft (AG) and NSU Motorenwerke in 1969. Auto Union AG in turn was formed in 1932, following the merger of Horch, DKW, Wanderer and the original Audi Automobilwerke GmbH Zwickau, established by August Horch in 1910.

In 2021, Audi reused the Horch name as a flagship trim level for the Audi A8 in China to compete with the Mercedes-Maybach S-Class.

== History ==
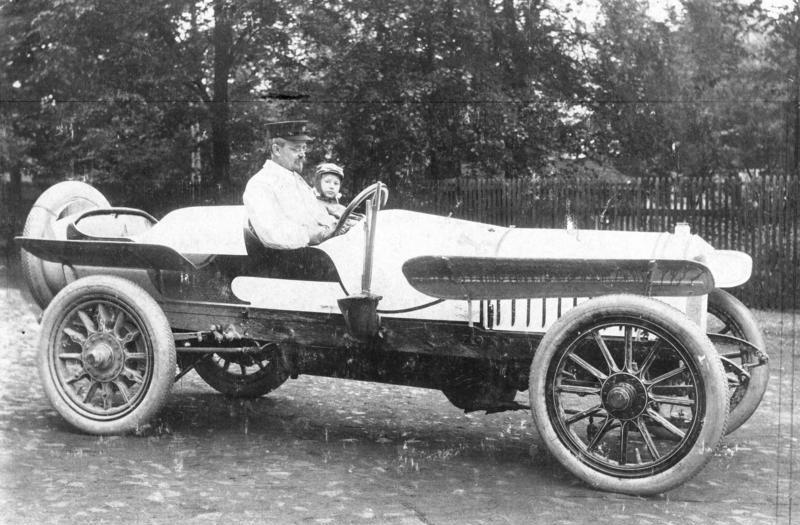
August Horch in his car (1908)

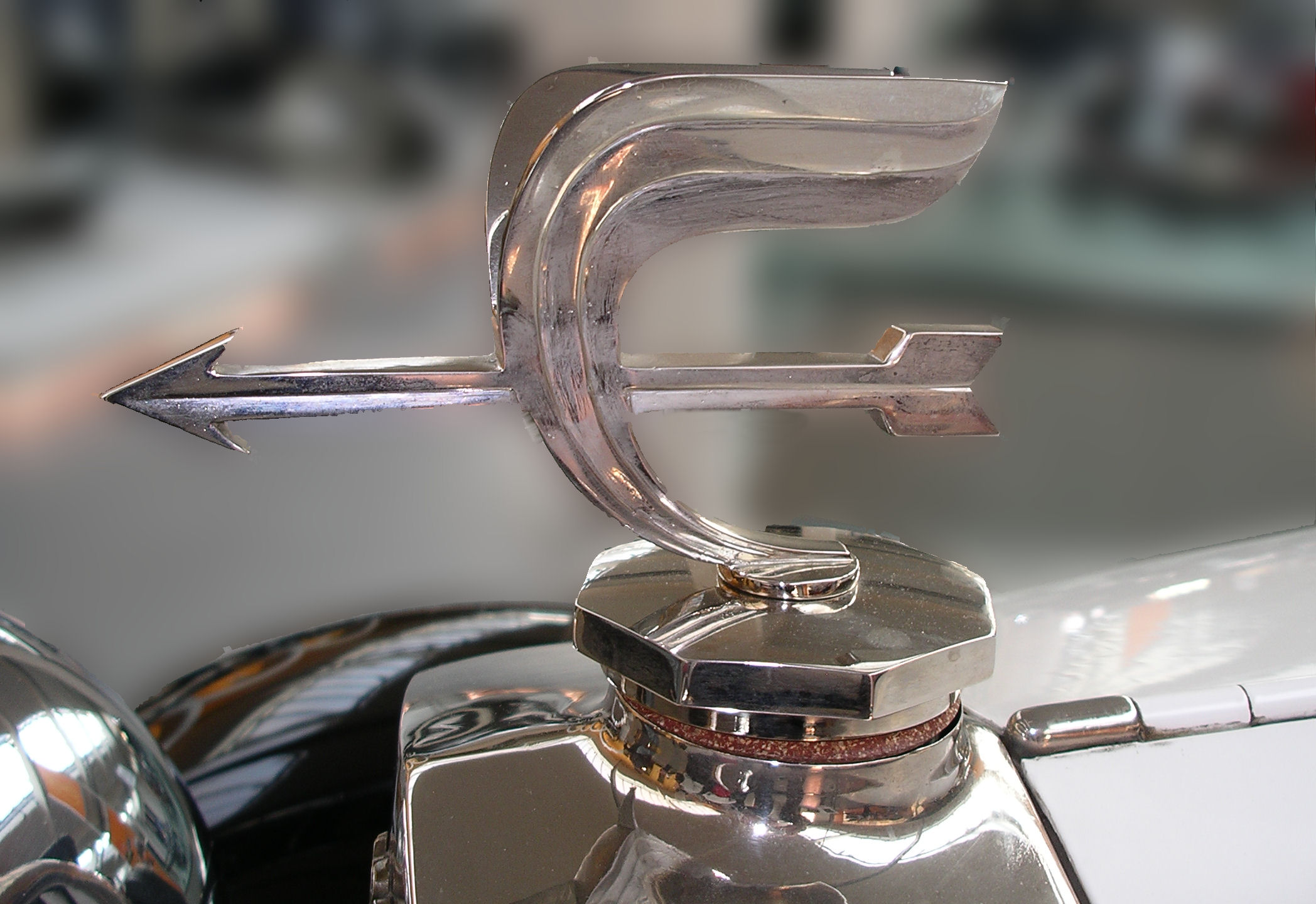
Horch hood ornament (1924)

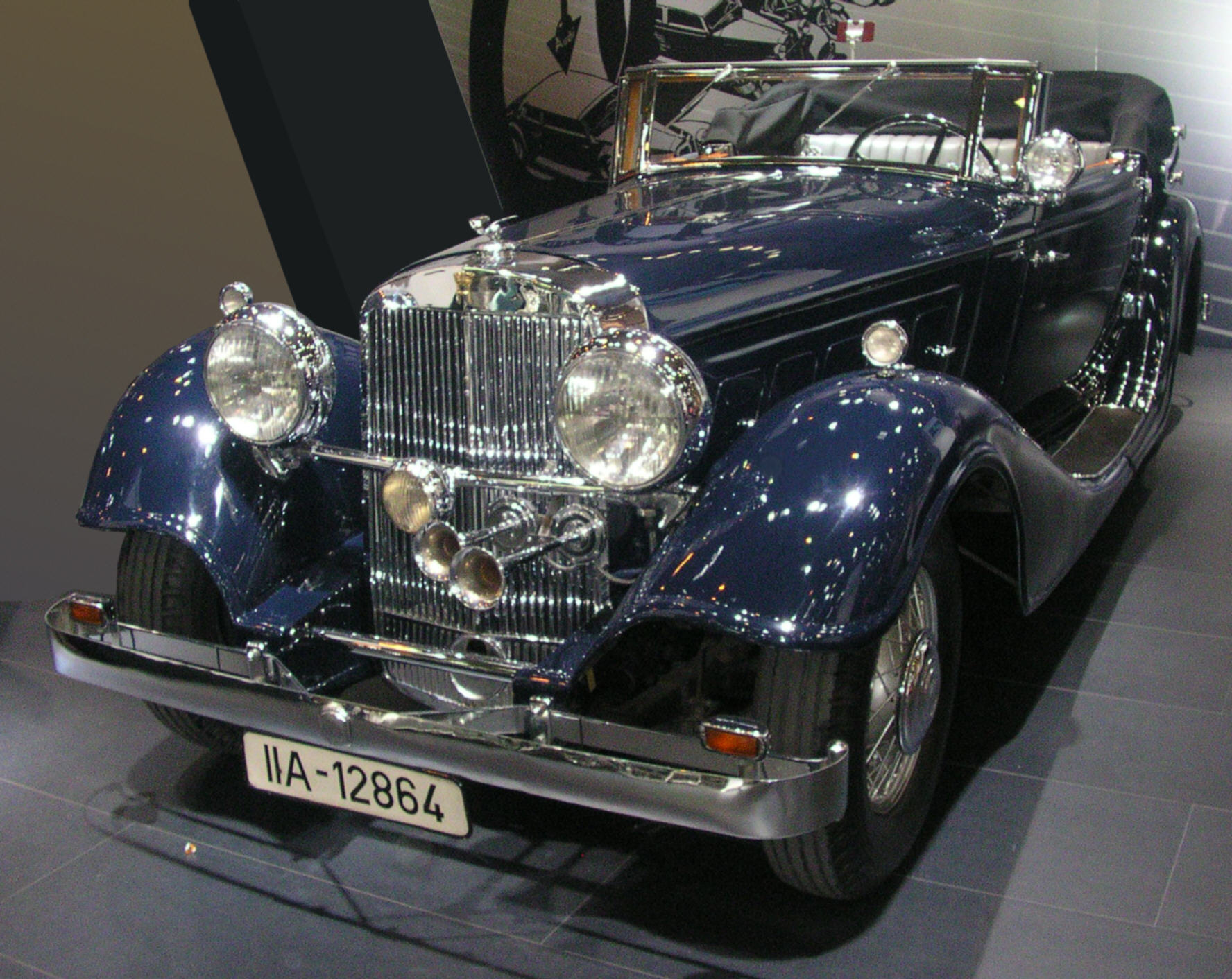
Horch 670, 12-cylinder luxury cabriolet (1932)

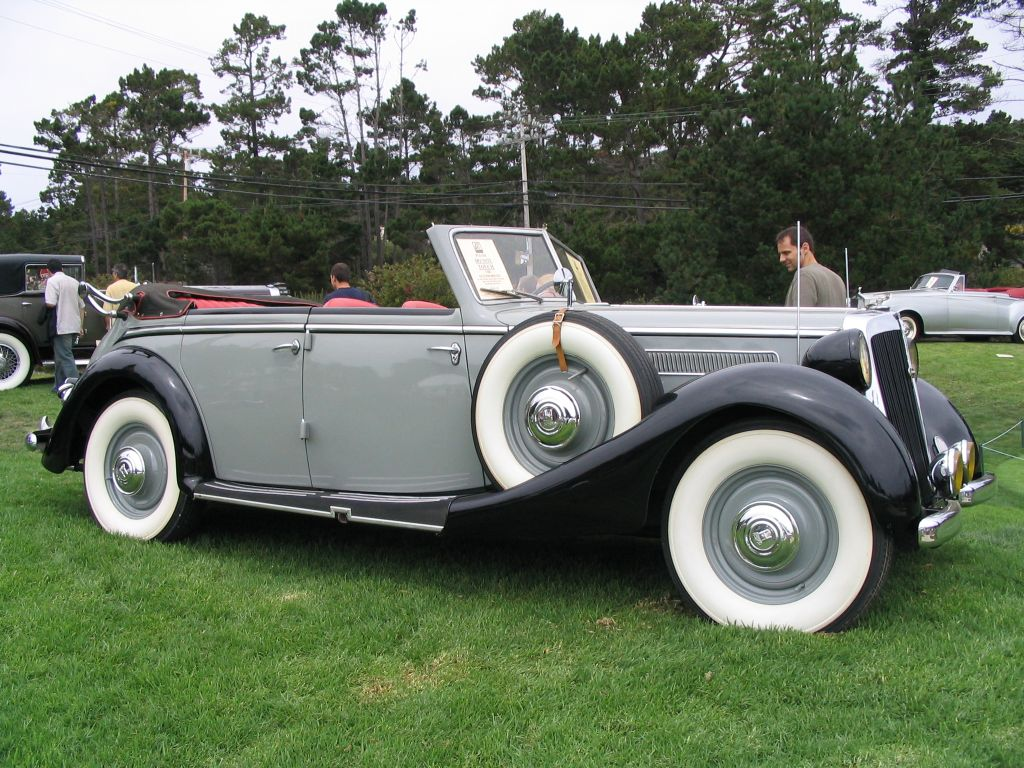
Horch 930 V Phaeton (1939)

August Horch and his first business partner Salli Herz established the company on November 14, 1899, in the district of Ehrenfeld, Cologne in Cologne. August Horch had previously worked as a production manager for Karl Benz. Three years later, in 1902, he moved the company to Reichenbach im Vogtland. On May 10, 1904, he founded the Horch & Cie. Motorwagenwerke AG, a joint-stock company in Zwickau (Kingdom of Saxony). The city of Zwickau was the capital of the South Western Saxon County and one of Saxony's industrial centres at that time.

After troubles with the Horch chief financial officer, August Horch founded a second company on July 16, 1909, the August Horch Automobilwerke GmbH in Zwickau. He had to rename the company because Horch was already a registered brand and he did not hold the rights to the name. On April 25, 1910, the name Audi Automobilwerke was entered in the company's register at the Zwickau registration court. Audi is the Latin translation of horch, from the German verb "horchen", which means "listen!" (compare English "hark"). The Audi name was proposed by a son of one of Horch's business partners from Zwickau.

In 1932, both companies from Zwickau (Horch and Audi) merged with Zschopauer Motorenwerke J. S. Rasmussen (the DKW brand) and the Wanderer car-production facilities to become the Auto Union corporation of Saxony. The Silver Arrow Auto Union racing cars of the team in Zwickau—developed by Ferdinand Porsche and Robert Eberan von Eberhorst, and driven by Bernd Rosemeyer, Hans Stuck, Tazio Nuvolari and Ernst von Delius—became known the world over in the 1930s.

== Initial cars ==
The company initially began producing 5 PS (3.7 kW) and 10 PS (7.4 kW) twin-cylinder engine automobiles near Cologne in 1901.

The first Horch had a 4.5 hp (3.4 kW; 4.6 PS) engine, with an alloy crankcase, a unique achievement in those days. It had an open-body design, with lighting provided by lanterns containing candles. In contrast with the powerful cars of later years, the first Horch could barely reach a top speed of 32 km/h (20 mph). It was significant at that time because it used a friction clutch, and had a drive shaft providing power to the wheels rather than a chain on the side.

The firm soon encountered financial difficulty, and Horch sought new partners. In March 1902, August Horch produced a 20 PS (14.7 kW) four-cylinder car with a shaft drive in Reichenbach in Vogtland. Horch cars were considered more advanced to those being built by Daimler under the Mercedes brand, or by Benz (who were separate manufacturers until the 1920s).

By 1903, Horch had built a car with a four-cylinder engine. In March of the following year, he introduced his new car at the Messe Frankfurt Fair.

In 1904, August Horch developed the first six-cylinder engine, which appeared in 1907. In 1906 a Horch automobile driven by Dr. Rudolf Stöss from Zwickau won the Herkomer Competition (equivalent to a 'brand-name' world championship at the time).

== 8-cylinder by Paul Daimler ==
In the 1920s, Moritz Straus, a cosmopolitan Berliner, was the principal stockholder of Argus Motoren and of the Horch company. He succeeded in making the Horch brand highly desirable by introducing art into the firm's advertising. He recognized that only a brand emphasising Horch's unique characteristics would be successful.

Under Hyperinflation in the Weimar Republic in the early 1920s, Daimler and Benz cooperated, and merged in 1926. Paul Daimler left the company his father had founded, to start working in 1923 for Argus and Horch as chief engineer. He introduced a range of eight-cylinder engines, starting with the 3.4-litre Horch 8 (Type 303) in 1926 which also introduced servo brakes. It used a lower frame, “underslung” (“Tiefbett”), than the car with which Daimler-Benz's chief engineer Ferdinand Porsche answered in a hurry, the tall “overslung” (“Hochbett”) early Mercedes-Benz W08 which also had a higher price. Thus, Horch was the leading brand of stylish premium cars in interwar Germany.

Daimler, aged 60, left in 1930 during the Great Depression, which yet another merger coming up.

== Auto Union ==
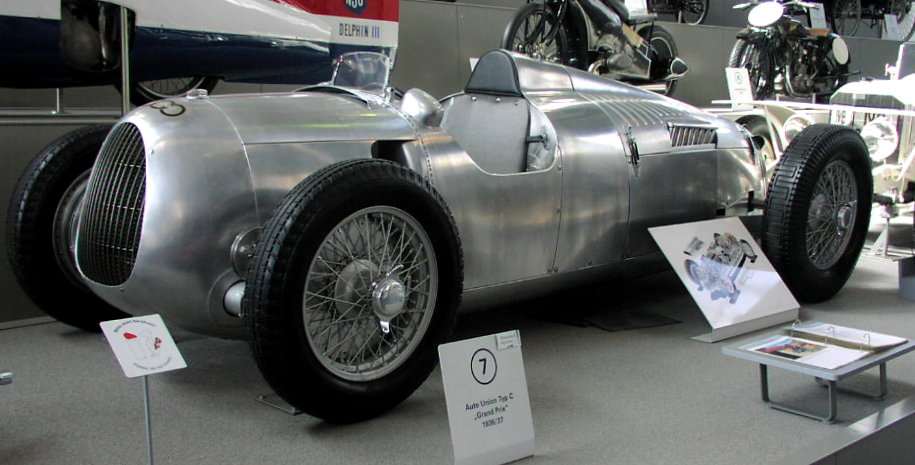
Auto Union Typ C (1936)

Eventually, on June 29, 1932, Horch, Audi, DKW and Wanderer merged to form the Auto Union. The current Audi four-ring logo is the Auto Union logo that represents the merger of these four brands. In the 1930s, Horch introduced a new line of smaller and cheaper, but more stylish, V8 automobiles starting with the 830B. Horch also continued to offer straight-eight engines for larger cars intended for more representational use. By 1936, Horch had completed their 25,000th eight-cylinder luxury car in Zwickau. In 1935 Horch introduced the straight-eight Horch 850-series, replacing the Horch 8 and 12 models as the top version, competing directly with the Mercedes-Benz 540K.

The Auto Union racing cars types A to D were developed and built by a specialist racing department of Horch works in Zwickau between 1933 and 1939. Between 1935 and 1937 Auto Union cars won 25 races, driven by Ernst von Delius, Tazio Nuvolari, Bernd Rosemeyer, Hans Stuck and Achille Varzi.

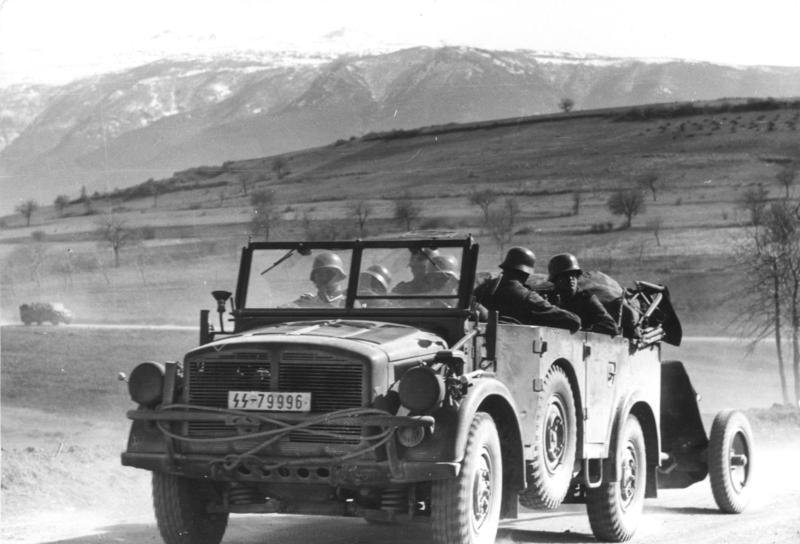
Heavy standard passenger car Type Horch 108 (1942)

Auto Union became a major supplier of vehicles to the German Wehrmacht, such as Heavy standard passenger car (Horch 108), Medium standard passenger car (Horch 901 and Wanderer 901) and Half-track Sd.Kfz. 11. The Romanian Army purchased 300 Horch 901 4x4 field cars to mechanize some of its anti-tank companies.

Civilian production was suspended after March 1940. This basically was the end of Horch.

After the war the Auto Union AG at Chemnitz was dissolved and in Ingolstadt, West Germany the new Auto Union GmbH was founded, where civilian car production continued. Due to widespread poverty in postwar Germany, only small DKW vehicles with two stroke engines were produced. These became outdated in the late 1950s with the DKW F102. After Auto Union was purchased first by Daimler-Benz, then in 1964 by the Volkswagenwerk AG, the old brand Audi was introduced again, together with the new four stroke vehicle Audi F103. Daimler-Benz retained the trademark rights to the Horch brand until the mid-1980s, then transferred them to Audi which in turn signed a waiver to not use the name „Silberpfeil" (silver-arrow) for any modern Audi racing car. However, the brand has remained dormant.

== Trabant connection ==
During the Second World War, the factories suffered heavy bomb damage. Later, the advancing Soviet forces captured the area, and it became part of the Soviet sector of divided Germany in 1945, and later became part of East Germany.

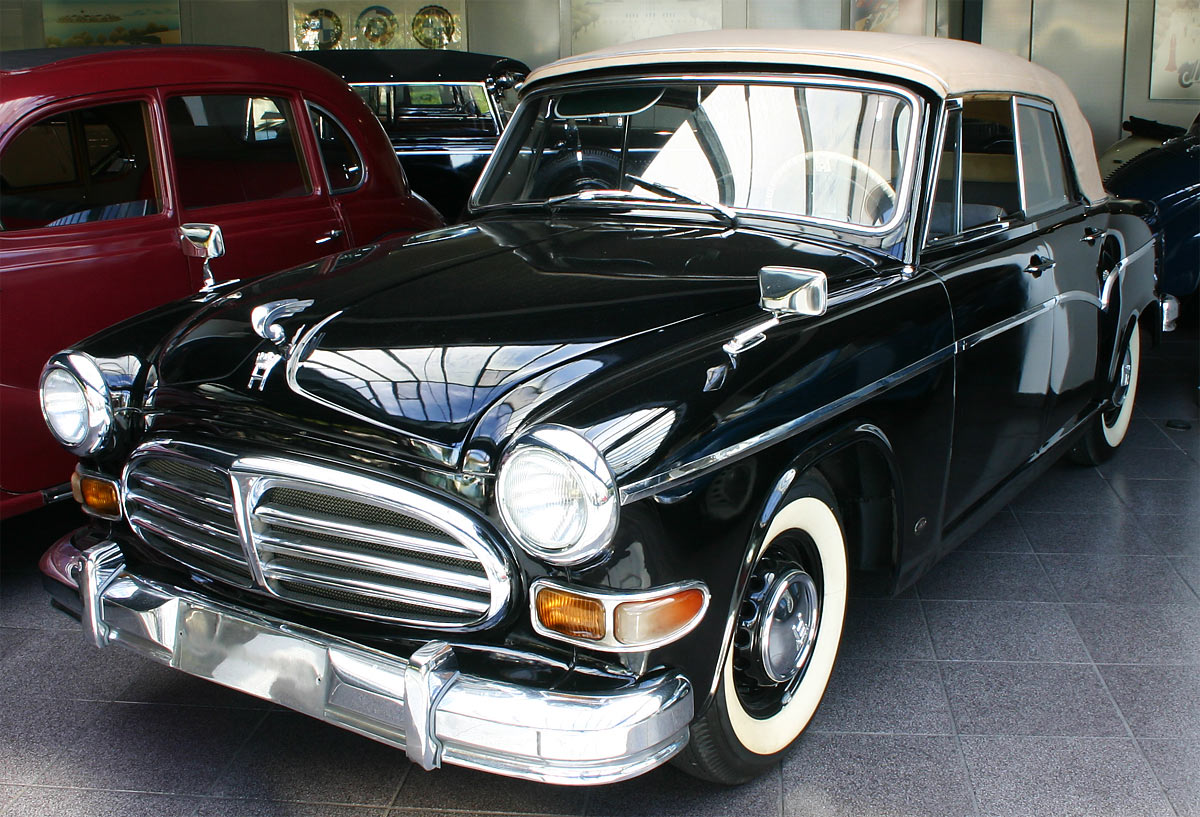
Horch P240 (Sachsenring) Cabriolet (1956)

From 1955 to 1958, old Horch factories produced the Horch P240, a six-cylinder car that was respected at the time. The former Horch and Audi operations from Zwickau were unified in 1958. A new brand, Sachsenring, within the East German corporation IFA was born. After unification in 1958, the P240 car was renamed as the Sachsenring P240. As the Soviet Administration inexplicably banned the foreign exportation of the P240, the East German economic administration decided to stop production of the vehicle. IFA also produced the initial Trabant P 50 model from 1957.

The Zwickau site was acquired in 1991 by Volkswagen, effectively restoring its connection with Audi. In 1991, Volkswagen constructed a new factory to the north of Zwickau in nearby Mosel.

== Rare collectibles ==
On June 24, 2006, a rare 1937 Horch 853A Sport Cabriolet in original unrestored, unprepared condition sold at auction in Cortland, NY for US$299,000.

In the late 1930s, Horch supplied a limited number of promotional scarves bearing the Horch logo. Sent only to the wealthiest drivers, it is a major collectible amongst diehard enthusiasts of the pre-war car era. However, there is also a degree of controversy associated with these scarves as they were commonly sought by senior SS members.

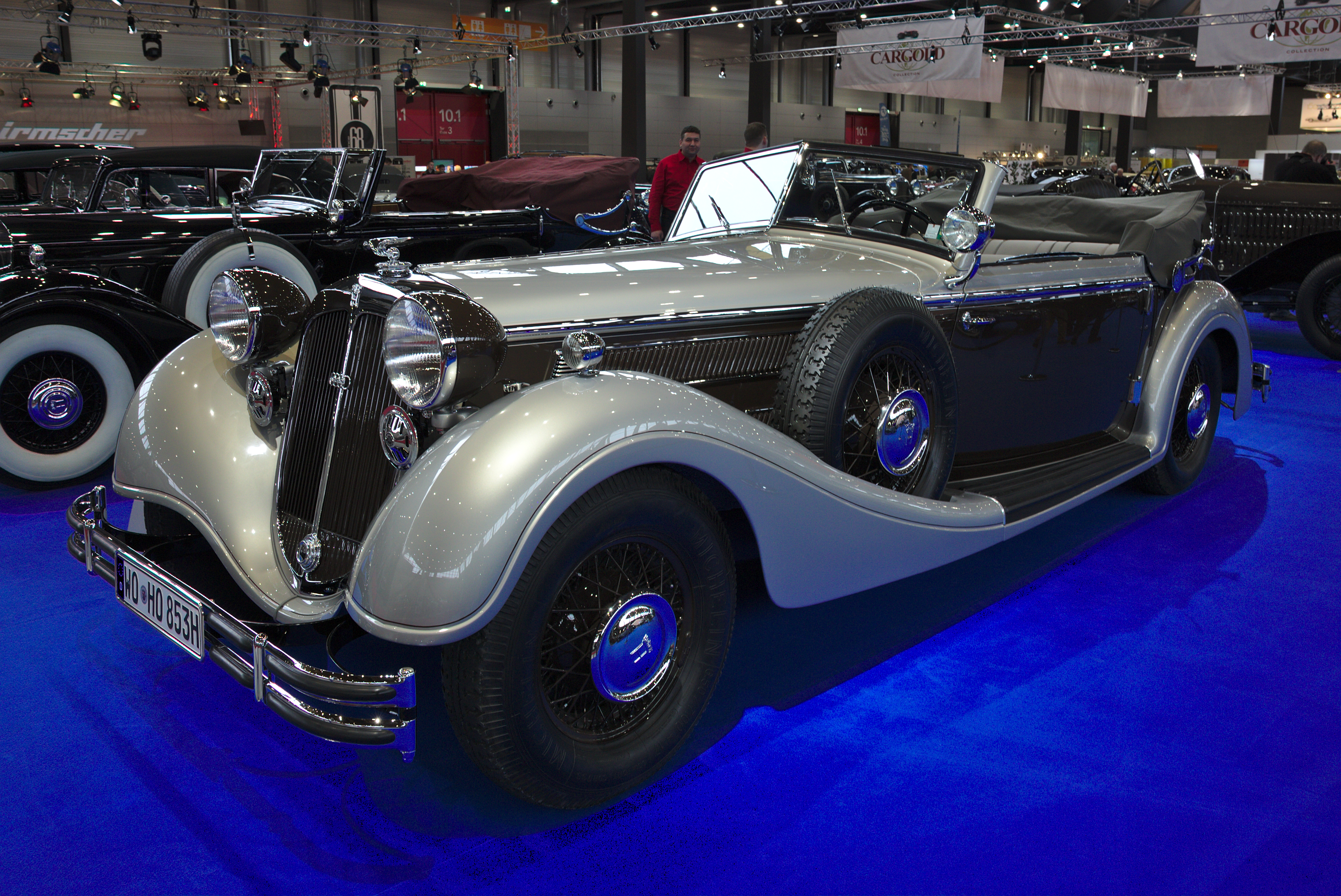
1939 Horch 853 A Cabriolet

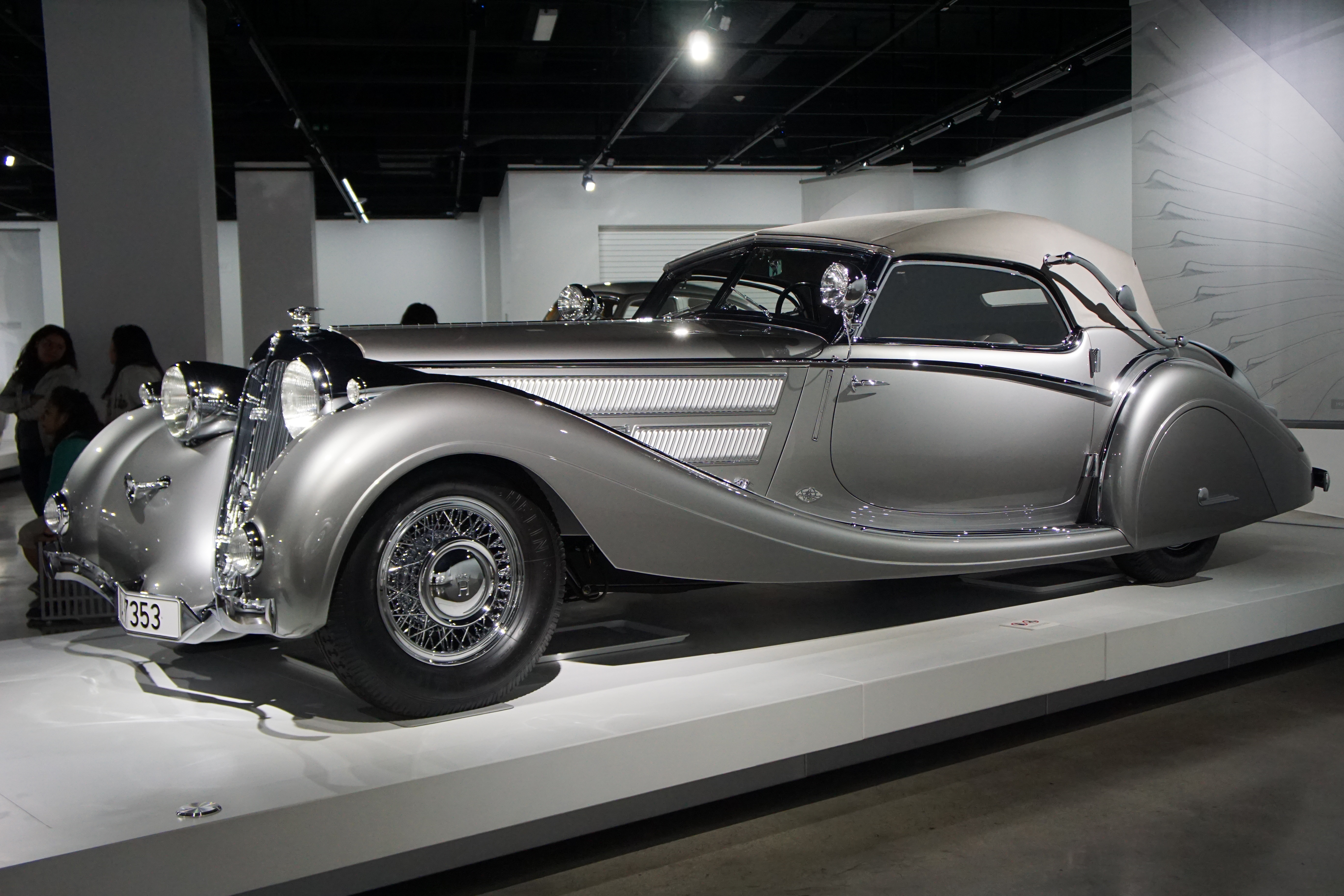
1937 Horch 853 Voll & Ruhrbeck Sport Cabriolet

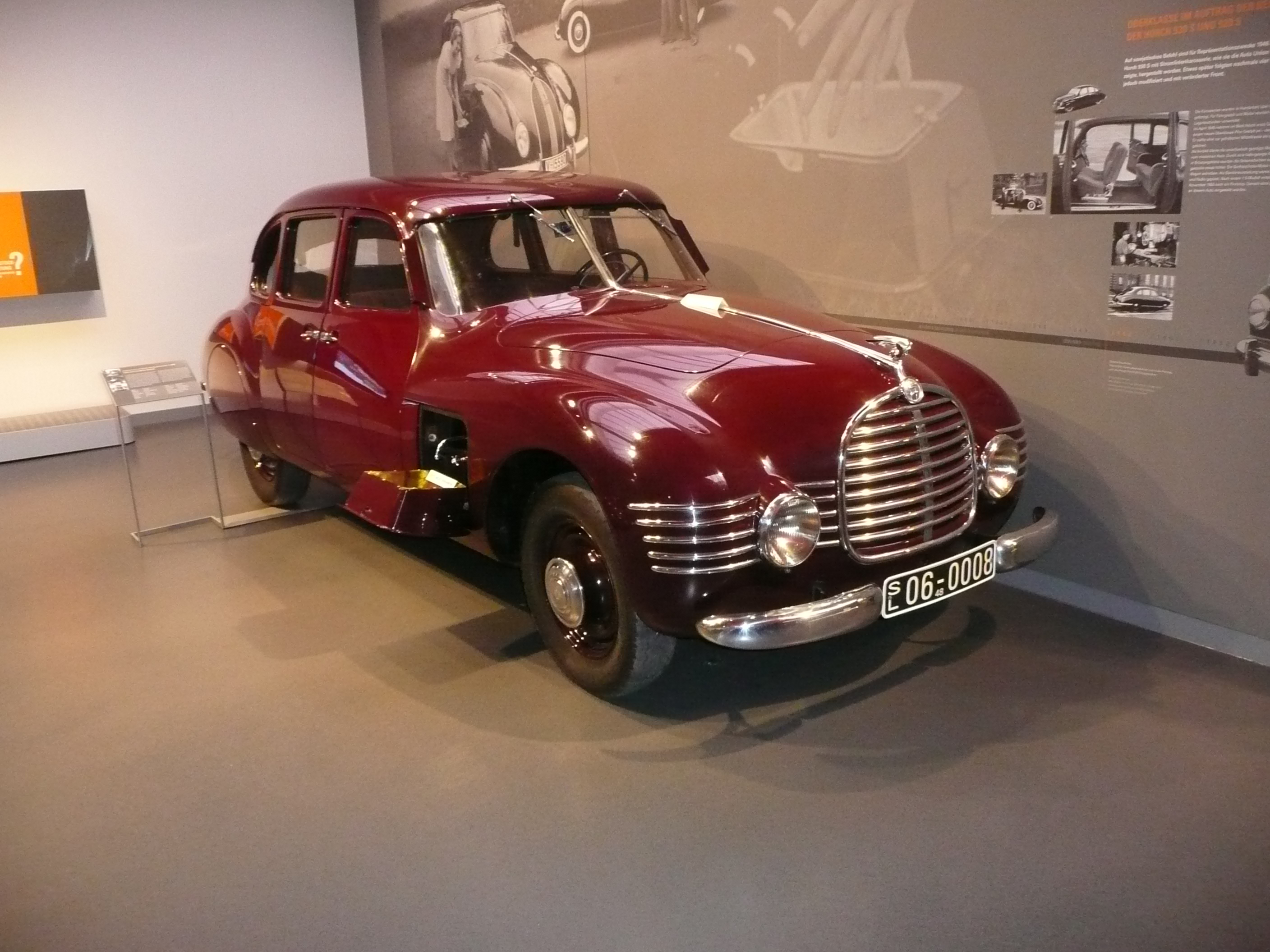
Horch 930S Stromlinie Limousine prototype Horch Museum

== Horch models ==
| Type | Construction | Cylinders | Displacement | Power | Top speed |
|---|---|---|---|---|---|
| 4–15 PS | 1900–1903 | straight-2 | | 2.9–3.7 kW | 60 km/h (37 mph) |
| 10–12 PS | 1902–1904 | straight-2 | | 7.4–8.8 kW | 62 km/h (39 mph) |
| 22–30 PS | 1903 | straight-4 | 2,725 cc | 16.2–18.4 kW | |
| 14–20 PS | 1905–1910 | straight-4 | 2,270 cc | 10.3–12.5 kW | |
| 18/25 PS | 1904–1909 | straight-4 | 2,725 cc | 16.2 kW | |
| 23/50 PS | 1905–1910 | straight-4 | 5,800 cc | 29 kW | 100 km/h (62 mph) |
| 26/65 PS | 1907–1910 | straight-6 | 7,800 cc | 44 kW | 120 km/h (75 mph) |
| 25/60 PS | 1909–1914 | straight-4 | 6.395 cc | 40 kW | 110 km/h (68 mph) |
| 10/30 PS | 1910–1911 | straight-4 | 2,660 cc | 18.4 kW | |
| K (12/30 PS) | 1910–1911 | straight-4 | 3,177 cc | 20.6 kW | 75 km/h (47 mph) |
| 15/30 PS | 1910–1914 | straight-4 | 2,608 cc | 22 kW | 80 km/h (50 mph) |
| H (17/45 PS) | 1910–1919 | straight-4 | 4,240 cc | 33 kW | |
| 6/18 PS | 1911–1920 | straight-4 | 1,588 cc | 13.2 kW | |
| 8/24 PS | 1911–1922 | straight-4 | 2,080 cc | 17.6 kW | 70 km/h (43 mph) |
| O (14/40 PS) | 1912–1922 | straight-4 | 3,560 cc | 29 kW | 90 km/h (56 mph) |
| Pony (5/14 PS) | 1914 | straight-4 | 1,300 cc | 11 kW | |
| 25/60 PS | 1914–1920 | straight-4 | 6,395 cc | 44 kW | 110 km/h (68 mph) |
| 18/50 PS | 1914–1922 | straight-4 | 4,710 cc | 40 kW (55 PS) | 100 km/h (62 mph) |
| S (33/80 PS) | 1914–1922 | straight-4 | 8,494 cc | 59 kW | |
| 10 M 20 (10/35 PS) | 1922–1924 | straight-4 | 2,612 cc | 25.7 kW | 80 km/h (50 mph) |
| 10 M 25 (10/50 PS) | 1924–1926 | straight-4 | 2,612 cc | 37 kW | 95 km/h (59 mph) |
| 8 Typ 303/304 (12/60 PS) | 1926–1927 | straight-8 | 3,132 cc | 44 kW | 100 km/h (62 mph) |
| 8 Typ 305/306 (13/65 PS) | 1927–1928 | straight-8 | 3,378 cc | 48 kW | 100 km/h (62 mph) |
| 8 Typ 350/375/400/405 (16/80 PS) | 1928–1931 | straight-8 | 3,950 cc | 59 kW | 100 km/h (62 mph) |
| 8 3 L Typ 430 | 1931–1932 | straight-8 | 3,009–3,137 cc | 48 kW (65 PS) | 100 km/h (62 mph) |
| 8 4 L Typ 410/440/710 | 1931–1933 | straight-8 | 4,014 cc | 59 kW (80 PS) | 100–110 km/h (62–68 mph) |
| 8 4.5 L Typ 420/450/470/720/750/750B | 1931–1935 | straight-8 | 4,517 cc | 66 kW (90 PS) | 115 km/h (71 mph) |
| 8 5 L Typ 480/500/500A/500B/780/780B | 1931–1935 | straight-8 | 4,944 cc | 74 kW (100 PS) | 120–125 km/h (75–78 mph) |
| 12 6 L Typ 600/670 | 1931–1934 | V12 | 6,021 cc | 88 kW (120 PS) | 130–140 km/h (81–87 mph) |
| 830 | 1933–1934 | V8 | 3,004 cc | 51 kW (70 PS) | 110–115 km/h (68–71 mph) |
| 830B | 1935 | V8 | 3,250 cc | 51 kW (70 PS) | 115 km/h (71 mph) |
| 830Bk/830BL | 1935–1936 | V8 | 3,517 cc | 55 kW (75 PS) | 115–120 km/h (71–75 mph) |
| 850/850 Sport | 1935–1937 | straight-8 | 4,944 cc | 74 kW (100 PS) | 125–130 km/h (78–81 mph) |
| 830BL/930V | 1937–1938 | V8 | 3,517 cc | 60 kW (82 PS) | 120–125 km/h (75–78 mph) |
| 830BL/930V | 1938–1940 | V8 | 3,823 cc | 67.6 kW (92 PS) | 125–130 km/h (78–81 mph) |
| Horch 851/853/853A/855/951/951A | 1937–1940 | straight-8 | 4,944 cc | 74 kW (100 PS) | 125–140 km/h (78–87 mph) |

== See also ==
- List of German cars
