= Horch 12 =

Horch Type 600/670
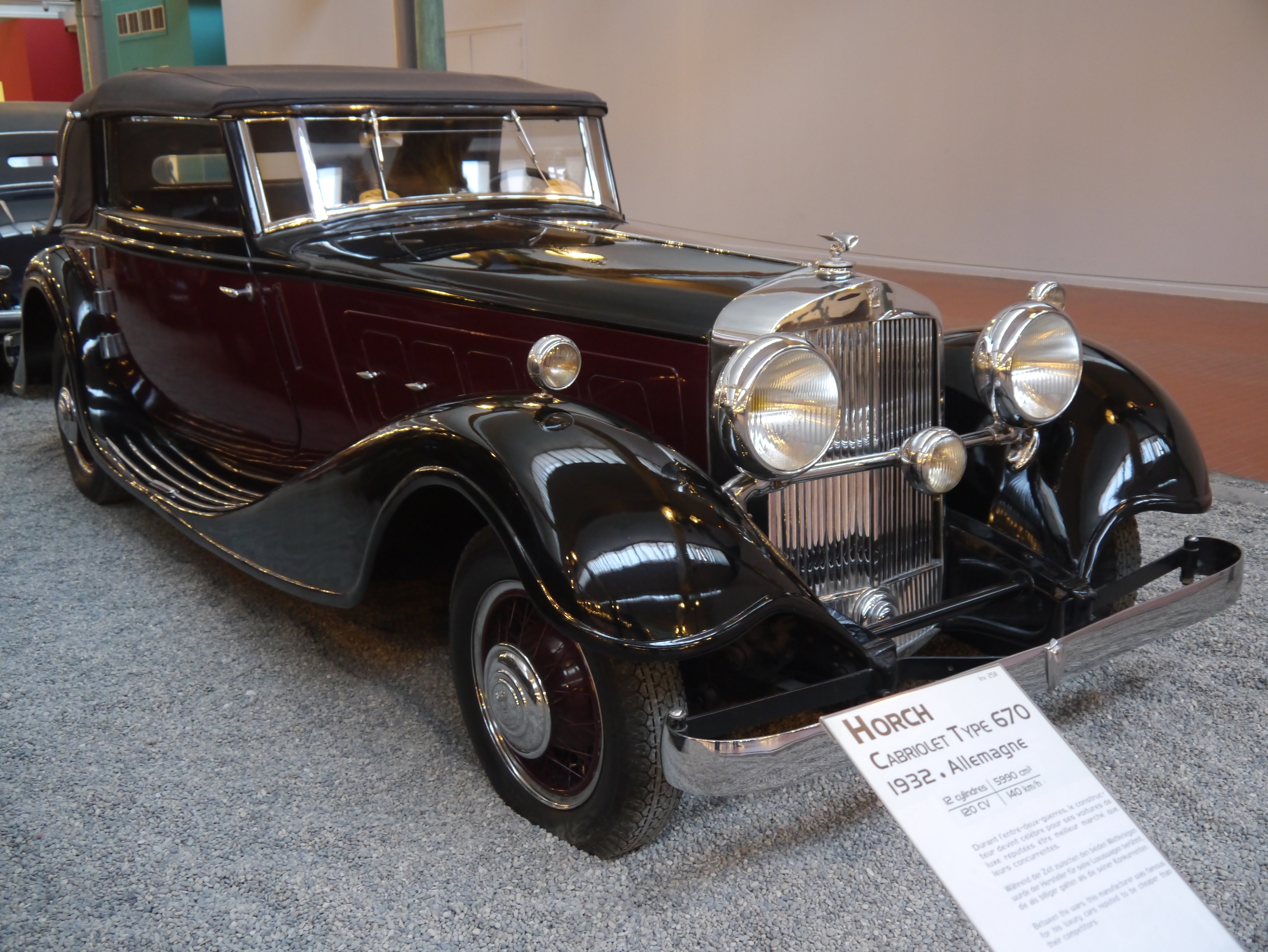
- Horch 670 at Cité de l'Automobile, Mulhouse, Alsace, France

Overview
- Manufacturer: Horch
- Production: 1931–1934 (Type 670); 52 produced; 1932-1933 (Type 600); 23 produced
- Assembly: Zwickau, Germany

Body and chassis
- Class: Full-size luxury car (F)
- Body style: 4-door cabriolet 2-door cabriolet 4-door saloon
- Layout: FR layout

Powertrain
- Engine: 6,031 cc (6.0L) V12
- Transmission: 4-speed manual /optional overdrive

Dimensions
- Wheelbase: 3,450 mm (136 in) (Type 670); 3,750 mm (148 in) (Type 600)

Chronology
- Predecessor: Horch 8

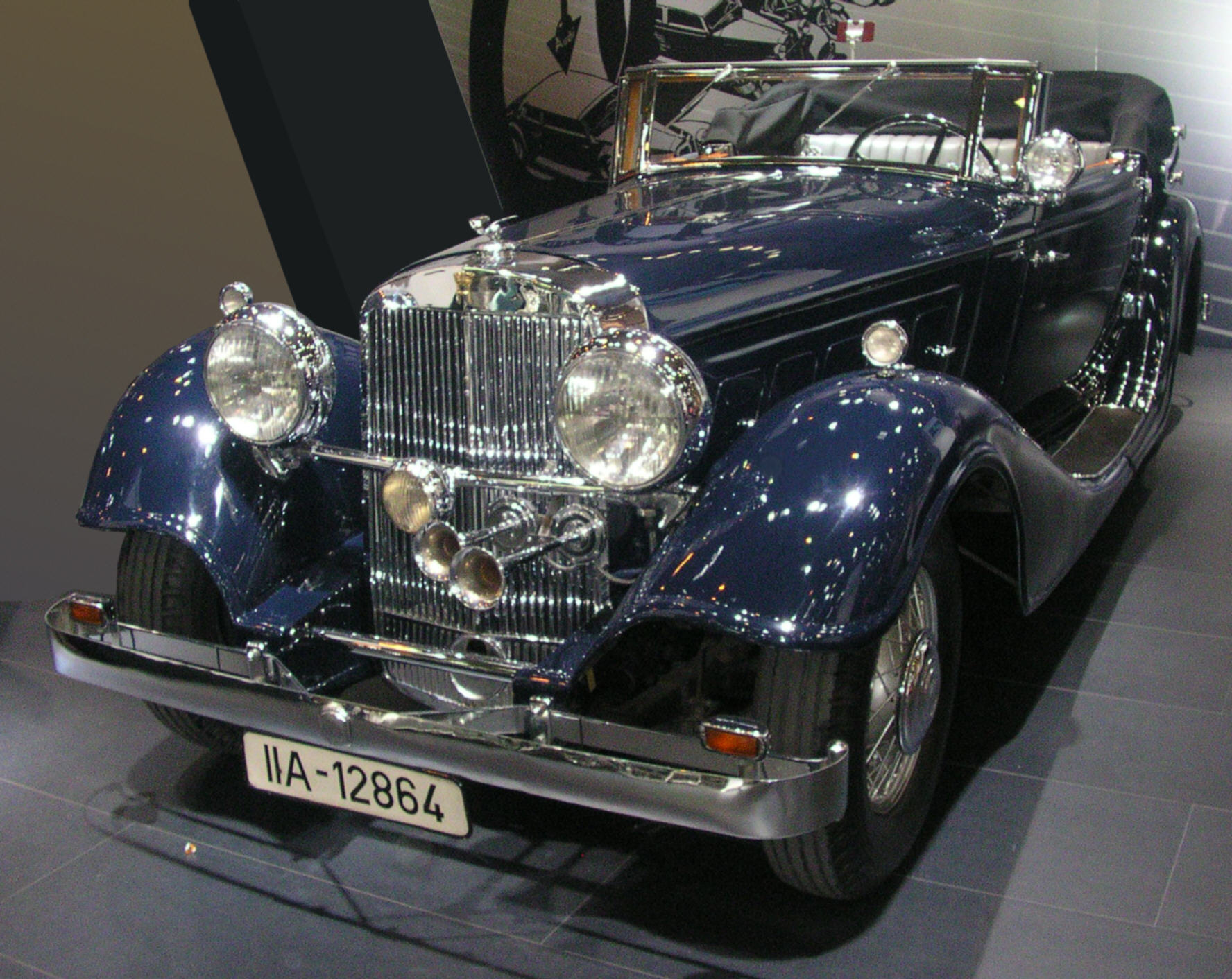
1932 Horch 670 Convertible

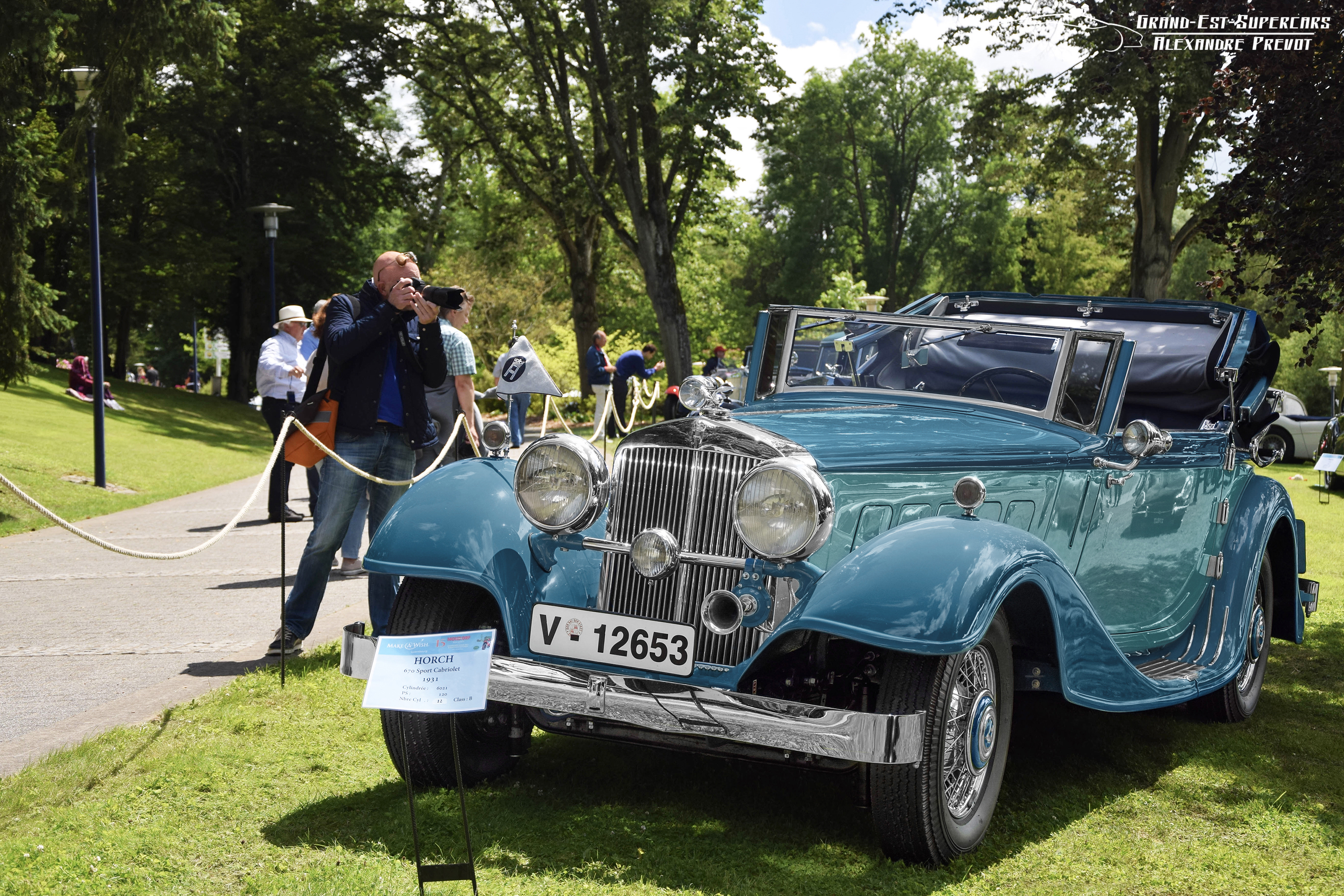
1931 Horch 670 Sport Cabriolet

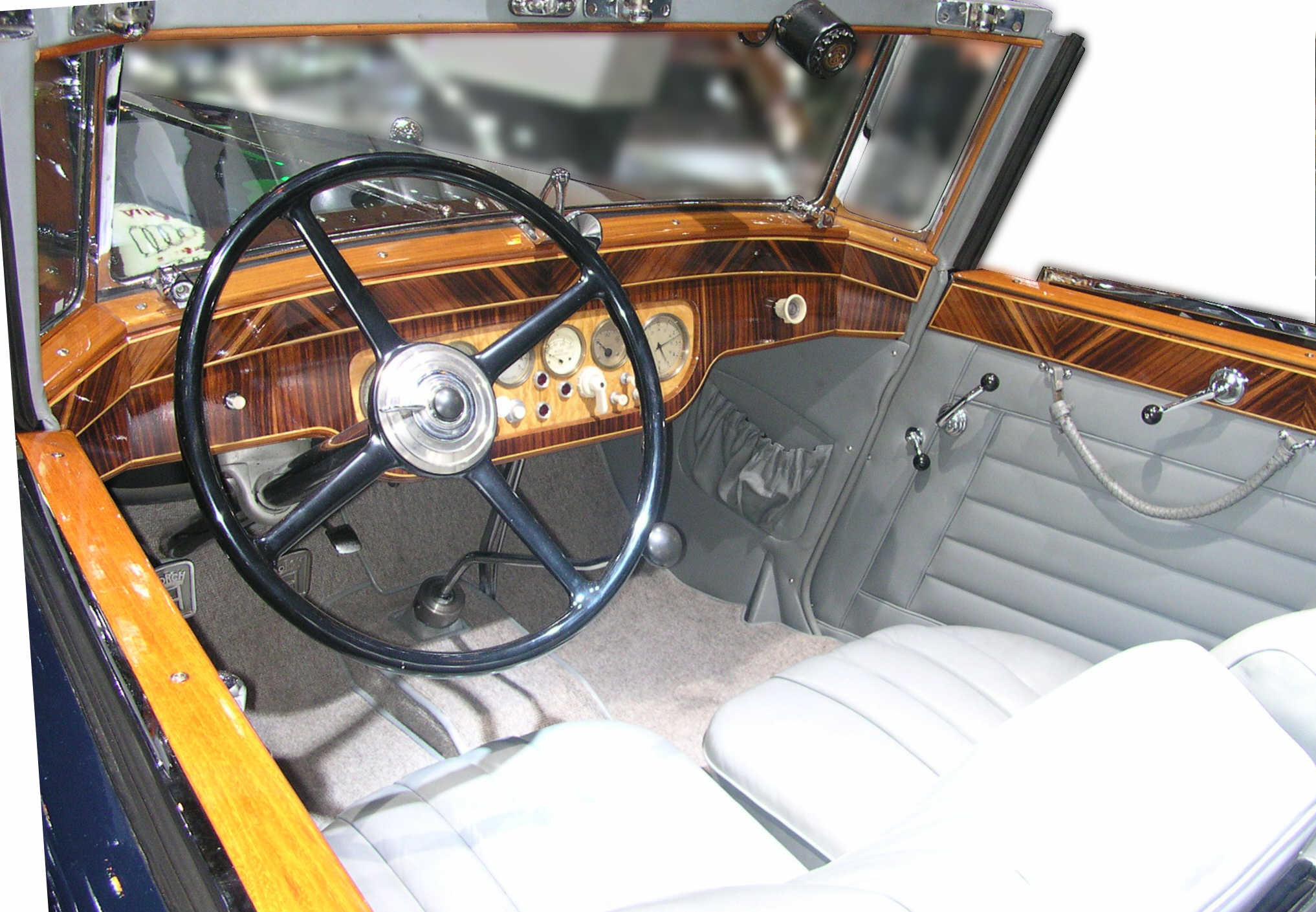
1932 Horch 670 Interior

The Horch Type 600 and Horch Type 670, collectively the Horch 12, is a 12-cylinder luxury car made by the German manufacturer Horch. The 670 was built from 1931 to 1934, and the larger and heavier (and consequently lower-performing) 600 from 1932-1933. The V12 engine put the car in a rarified sphere of early 12-cylinder luxury cars.

== History ==
The Horch 12 was the first and only Horch to be powered by a V12 engine, positioning itself above the Horch 8 series, powered by an inline-eight. However, the Wall Street crash of 1929 made selling such a vehicle a difficult task, even though the Horch was priced considerably lower than period competitors such as the Maybach Zeppelin, Hispano-Suiza J12, and Grosser Mercedes.

The first model in the series, the 670, was presented at the Paris Motor Show in September 1931. The 670 was a huge two-door, four-seat convertible by Gläser of Dresden, which used the same chassis as the Horch 8 with a wheelbase of 3.45 metres.

In 1932 the 600 was introduced at the Geneva Motor Show, which was structurally and mechanically identical to the 670 but was available as a four-door limousine or six-seat convertible. These two additional seats were made possible by using the chassis of the 500B with a wheelbase of 3.75 metres.

23 Horch 600s were produced between 1932 and 1933. After the discontinuation of the 600, only the 670 remained, of which 58 were made between 1932 and 1934. A total of 81 V12 chassis were produced, of which four 670 convertibles survive. The Horch 12 did not receive a direct successor, so the Horch model range from then on consisted only of 8-cylinder models.

== Design ==
The Horch 12's V12 engine was designed by Werner Strobel and Horch's then-Technical Director Fritz Fiedler and consisted of two banks -of six cylinders each- in a 66-degree V configuration with a total displacement of 6021 cc, and featured a crankshaft with seven bearings. The camshaft, driven by a chain with an automatic tensioning device, was located centrally between the two cylinder banks and operated the horizontally arranged sidevalves via rocker arms. The sealing surface between the cylinder block and head, and thus also the head gasket, was angled. The engine produced a maximum output of 120 PS (88 kW) at 3,200 rpm. This power was transmitted to the rear wheels via a manual four-speed transmission with ZF overdrive. The 670 model could attain a maximum speed of 145 km/h (90 mph), with the 600 model slightly slower.

The engine was equipped with hydraulic valve control, a system that was decades ahead of its time. The driver could supply lubricating oil to the cylinders and pistons via a dedicated line system from the dashboard, which increased compression and thus facilitated cold starts.

The chassis featured rigid axles with leaf springs, which was common practice at the time. The hydraulic braking system with its Bosch Dewandre brake servo, however, was ahead of the usual technical trends of the time. A special feature of the Horch 12 was its permanently installed hydraulic jacks for changing wheels.

=== Technical data ===
	670	600
Year of introduction	1931–1934	1932–1933
Bodystyles	2-door convertible	4-door saloon 4-door convertible
Engine	Twelve cylinder V four stroke gasoline engine	
Valve timing	Flathead engine (side operated)	
Bore × Stroke	80 mm × 100 mm	
Displacement	6031 cc	
Maximum power	120 PS (88 kW; 118 hp) at 3200 rpm	
Consumption	ca. 26 l/100 km	ca. 28 l/100 km
Top speed	140 km/h	130 km/h
Curb weight	2300 kg	2500 kg
Total weight	2950 kg	3200 kg
On board voltage	12 Volt	
Chassis Frame	U-profile pressed steel frame, bolted to the body	
Suspension	Rigid axles with semi-elliptical springs and hydraulic shock absorbers	
Brakes	Hydraulically operated drum brakes on all four wheels, mechanically operated parking brake, acting on the rear wheels	
Length	5400 mm	5550 mm
Width	1820 mm	
Height	1650 mm	1720 mm
Wheelbase	3450 mm	3750 mm
Front/Rear Track	1470 mm/1500 mm	
Turning Circle	14.5 m	16.5 m

- PL4 = 4 door Pullman limousine
- PC4 = 4 door Pullman convertible
- Cb2 = 2 door Convertible

== Legacy ==
Only a handful of Horch 12s are known to survive today (four confirmed convertibles according to most sources, though some references mention up to six). Surviving examples are displayed in museums including the Audi museum mobile in Ingolstadt, the Cité de l'Automobile in Mulhouse, France, and the ZeitHaus at the Autostadt in Wolfsburg. The model remains a symbol of Horch's engineering ambition during the final years of independent luxury-car production before the Auto Union era and the onset of World War II.

== Gallery ==
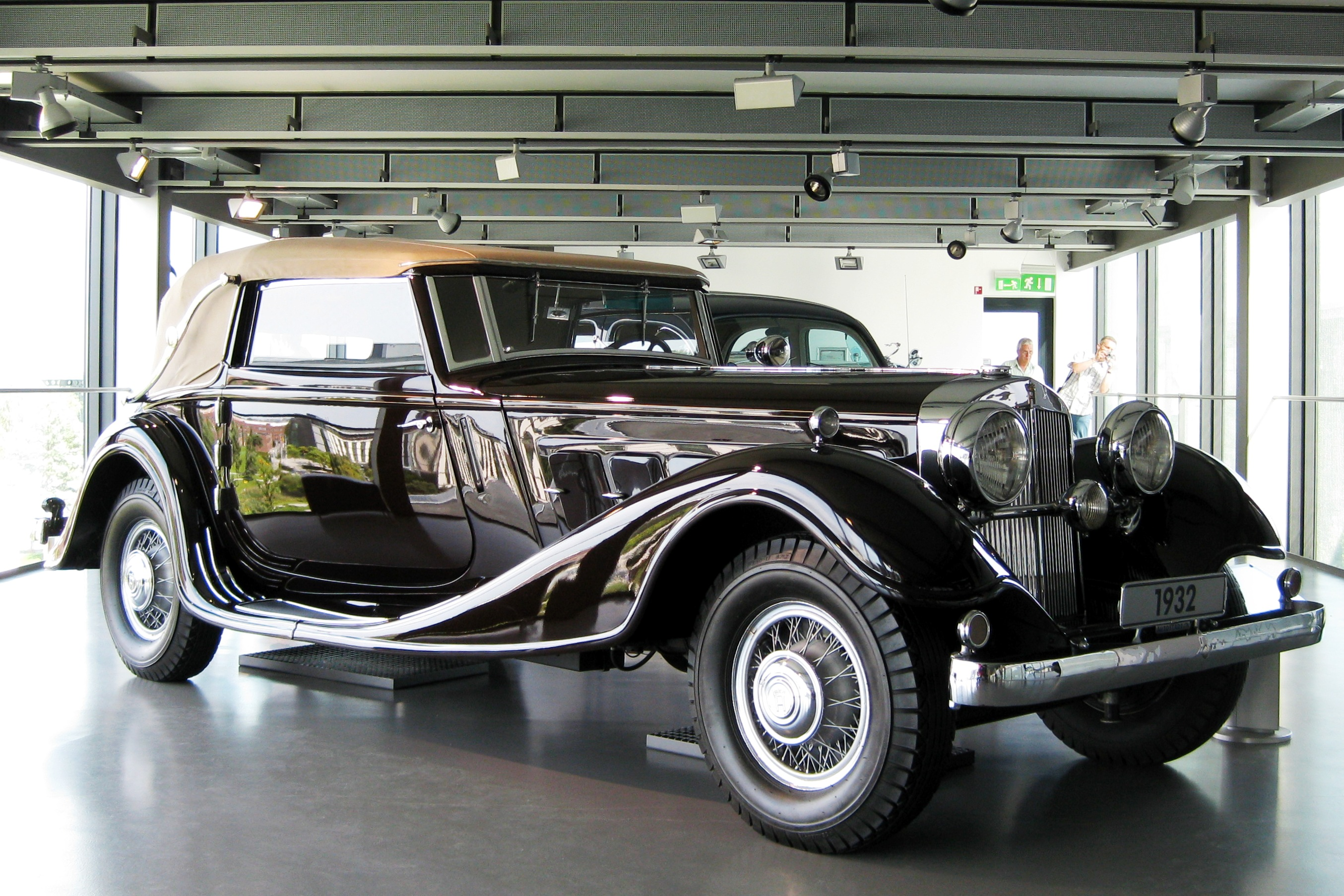
1932 Horch 670 Sport Cabriolet

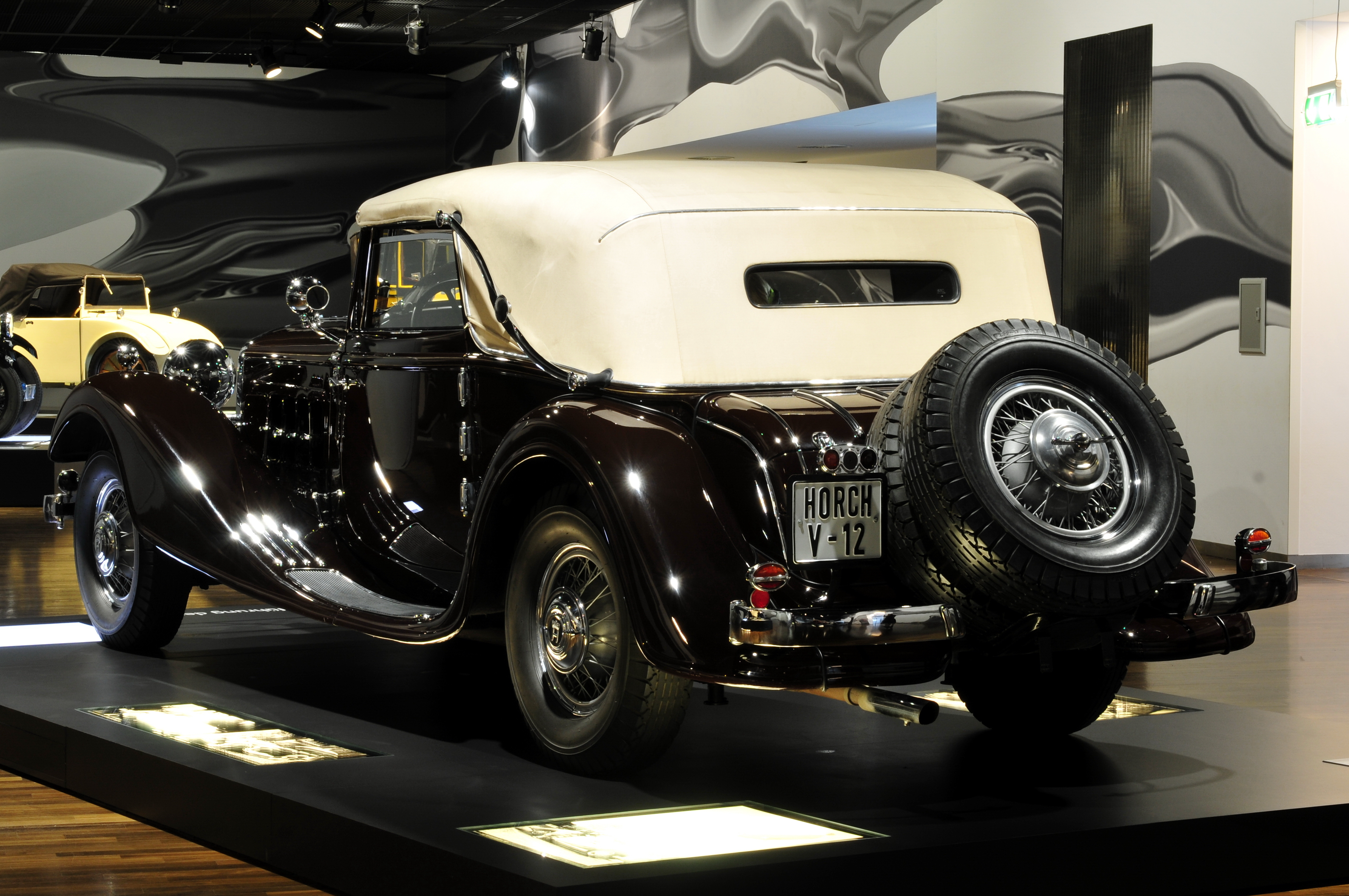
1932 Horch 670 Sport Cabriolet

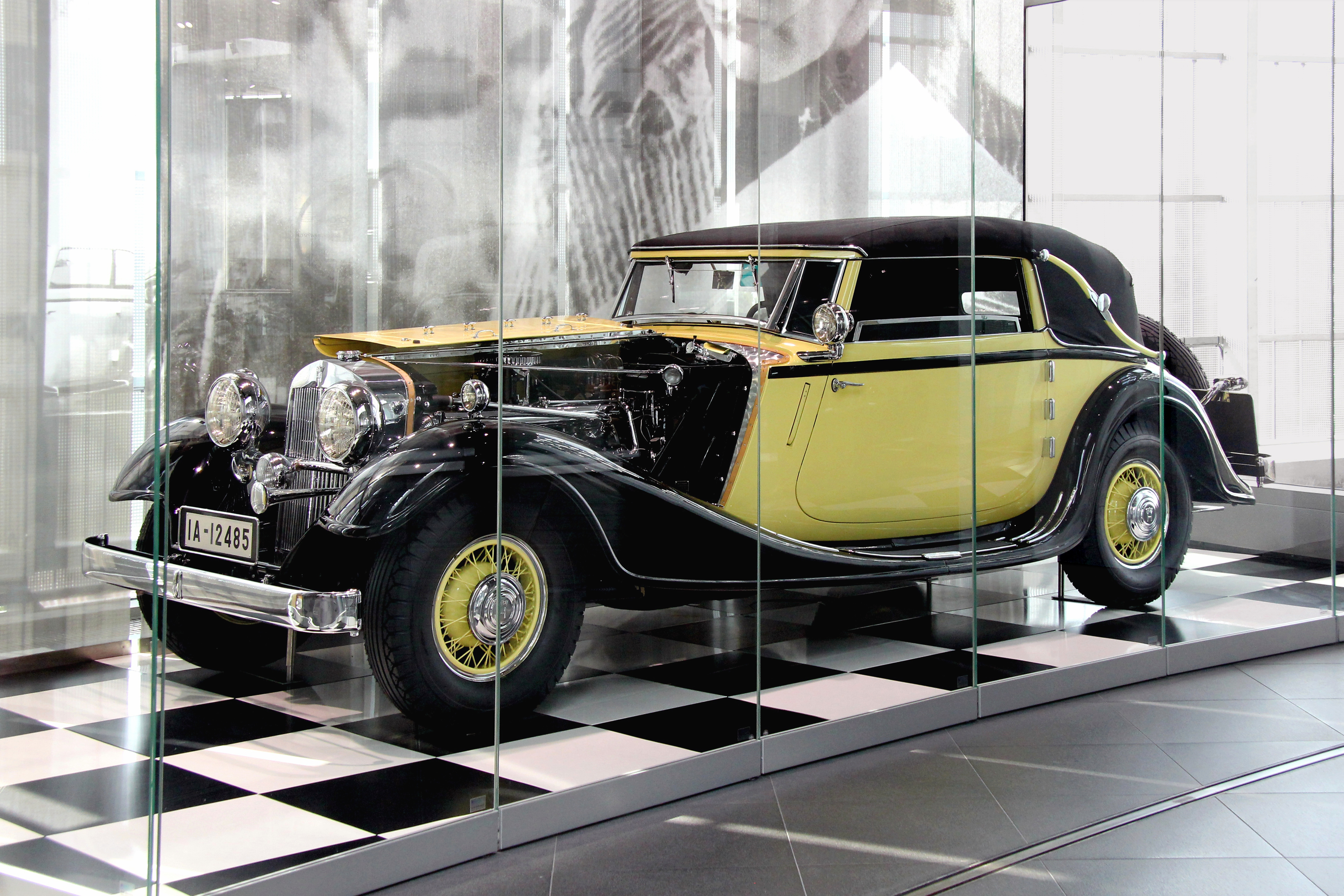
1932 Horch 670 Sport Cabriolet

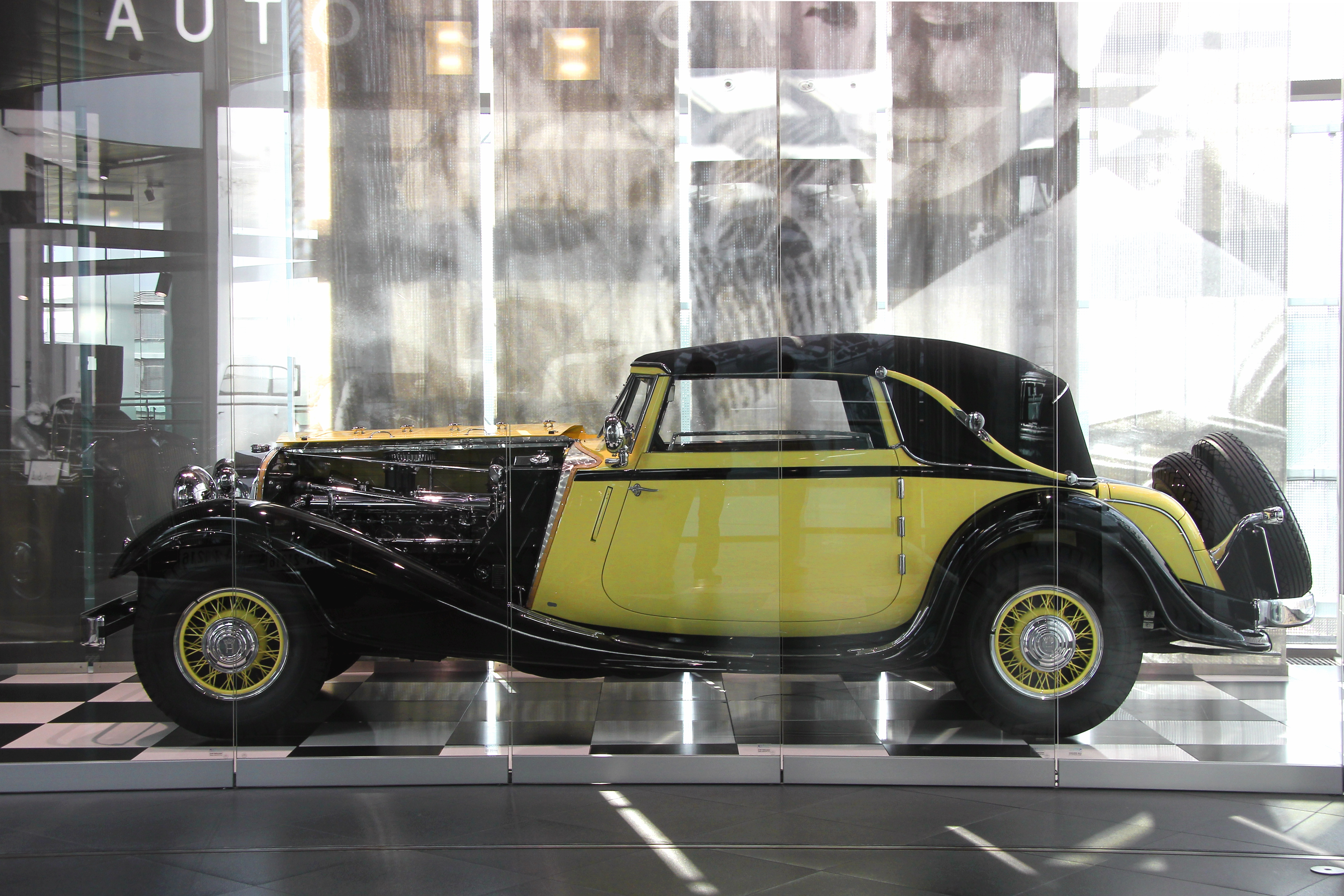
1932 Horch 670 Sport Cabriolet

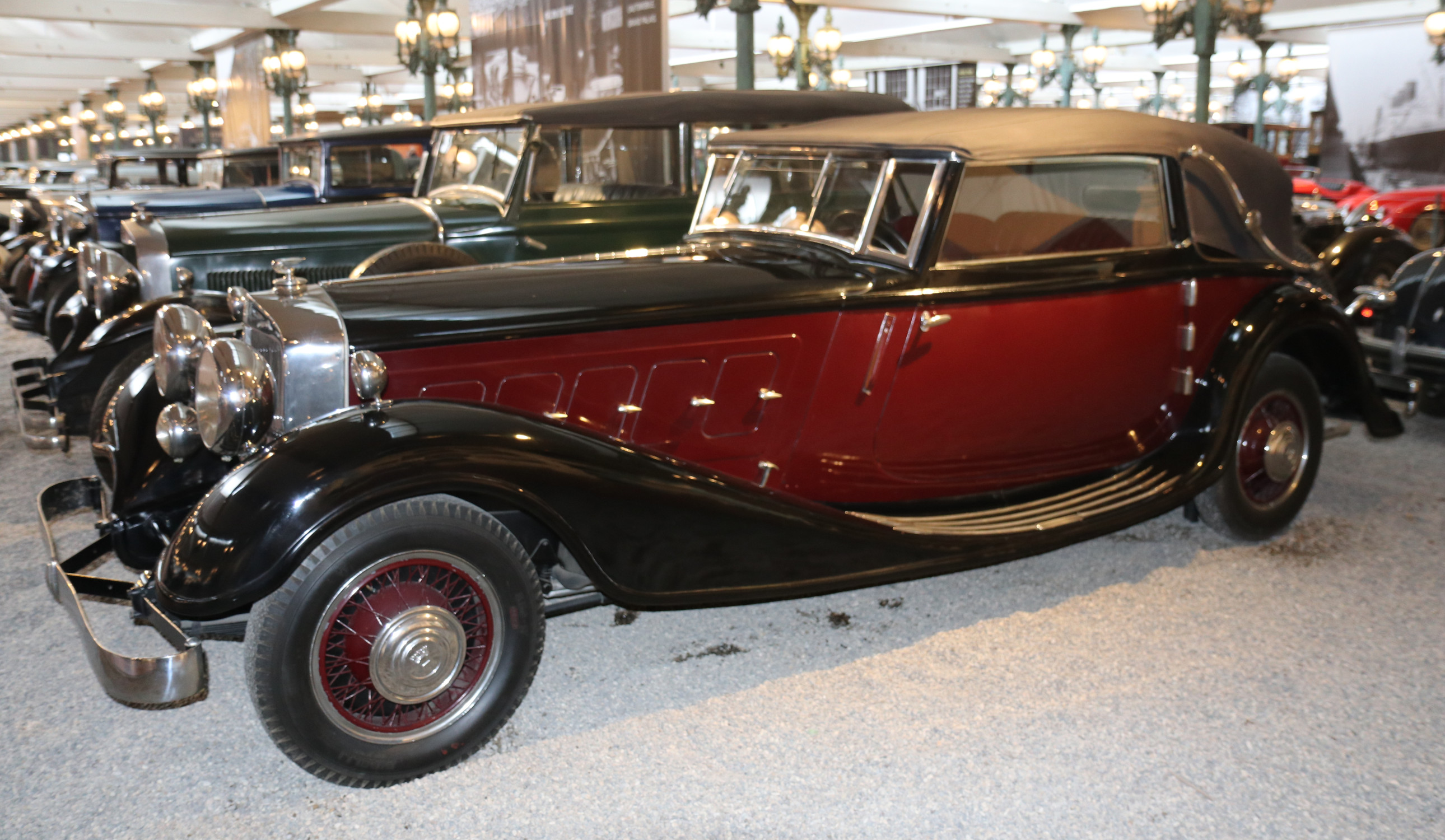
1932 Horch 670

== Bibliography ==
- Kirchberg, Peter; Pönisch, Jürgen (2006). Horch: Typen, Technik, Modelle (in German) (1 ed.). Bielefeld: Delius Klasing. ISBN 3-7688-1775-X.
- Schrader, Halwart (2002). Deutsche Autos - Band 1 (in German) (1 ed.). Stuttgart: Motorbuch-Verl. ISBN 3-613-02211-7.
