= Fama =

Fama or FAMA may refer to:

== People ==
- Eugene Fama (born 1939), American economist
- Mary Fama (1938–2021), New Zealand applied mathematician

== Places ==
- Fama, Mali
- Fama, Minas Gerais

== Music ==
- FAMA, Hong Kong hip hop duo
- Fama (band), a band originally from Houston, Texas

== Organisations ==
- Flota Aérea Mercante Argentina (FAMA), a defunct airline of Argentina, predecessor of Aerolíneas Argentinas
- Fama International, a collective of writers, artists, journalists from Sarajevo
- Forces Armées Maliennes (FAMa), the French name for the Malian Armed Forces
- Department of Families and Affordability (commonly abbreviated FAMA), child protection agency in Newfoundland, Canada
- Federal Agricultural Marketing Authority (Malaysia), a Malaysian government agency

== Other uses ==
- 408 Fama, asteroid
- Fama IM, instant messaging
- Freshwater And Marine Aquarium, a consumer fishkeeping magazine
- Pheme (Greek) or Fama (Roman), personification of fame and renown
- HMS Fama, British navy ships
- TV Fama, a Brazilian entertainment news program
- Fama (ship), a Dutch privateering ship

== See also ==
- La Fama, Mexican TV series
