= Ingo Günther =

Conceptual artist

Ingo Gunther
- Born: Ingo Günther; Bad Eilsen, Germany
- Education: Kunstakademie Düsseldorf, Goethe University Frankfurt
- Known for: Art; Media Art; Installation art Conceptual Art; New Media Art
- Notable work: WorldProcessor (1988-2025), Refugee Republic (1994-2017), Kanal X (1989), Anti-Feyerabend (for Paul Feyerabend) (1991-94), Hiroshima-Thank-you-Instrument (1995-2011), Diplomachine (2023)
- Awards: International Siemens Media Arts Prize, Sprengel Prize, Anton Stankowski Award, Ars Viva

Ingo Günther (born 1957 in Bad Eilsen, Germany) is a conceptual artist who is also known as a media artist and journalist.

== Life ==
In 1977 Ingo Günther began studying ethnology and cultural anthropology at the Goethe University Frankfurt. From 1978 to 1983 he studied at the State Academy of Düsseldorf and in 1982 graduated as Nam June Paik's first master student. In 1983 he received the PS1 scholarship from the Kunstakademie. After brief teaching positions at the Braunschweig University of Art in 1985 and the Art Academy Münster in 1986 and the San Francisco Art Institute in 1987, From 1990 to 1994 he was a founding professor at the Academy of Media Arts Cologne; from 2001 to 2003 a professor at the Zurich University of the Arts and in 2006/07 a guest professor at the Tōkyō Geijutsu Daigaku (東京藝術大学, Tokyo University of the Arts). In 2016, he took over a project professorship at the Karlsruhe University of Arts and Design.

== Work ==
Günther's work is characterized by its interdisciplinary approach, combining art, science, journalism and technology to address contemporary global issues. His projects often involve the use of data visualization, mapping, and interactive media to engage audiences in critical discussions about the state of the world.

== WorldProcessor ==
One of Günther's most significant projects is his WorldProcessor project, which he began in 1988. With the notion of globality barely in the air, Gunther expanded his journalistic work and embarked on the project. The project consists of a series of illuminated globes, which he modifies often radically, sometimes subtly, to reflect the socio-economic and political changes impacting the entire planet. The globes depict various global phenomena, such as climate change, migration patterns, economic inequality, and political conflicts. Each globe is a representation of a specific issue, using data from scientific research, international organizations, and other sources. The globes serve as both artistic objects and educational tools, inviting viewers to engage global issues macroscopically. It has been praised for its ability to make complex data accessible and visually compelling.

The project premiered first in a Hamburg gallery in 1989 and shortly after at the P3 art and environment underground exhibition space in Tokyo. From 1994 to 2000 this work was regularly published on the cover of Foresight magazine, Tokyo. Harper's Magazine published Gunther's work on its September cover and throughout the magazine. Le Monde Diplomatique ran his work on its front page in March 2018

The project has continued to this day, with close to 500 separate subjects covered and well over 1,000 globes - many of which are in public collections, such as in Ryōzen, Fukushima, Japan; World Economic Forum in Cologny; Kyushu University; Hiroshima City Museum of Contemporary Art, Obayashi Corporation; the Autostadt, Germany; Aichi Expo Memorial Park (Aichi Kyuhaku Kinen Koen), Nagoya, Japan.

His work has appeared in Japanese high school textbooks since 2007.

The most recent iterations of the Worldprocessor project were commissioned by the Japanese National Museum of Emerging Science (Miraikan), Tokyo for its Geo-Cosmos sphere. On this 6 meter one-of-a-kind display at the heart of the museum, high resolution digital animated versions Geo-Cosmos WorldProcessor globes, have appeared there daily since mid 2011.

Günther has created numerous other projects that explore the intersection of art, science, and politics.

== Refugee Republic ==
Gunther, working as a journalist, had visited Cambodian and Burmese refugee camps in Thailand and interned Vietnamese 'boat people' in Hong Kong and southern Thailand. Finding that his role as a journalist would not allow a proper presentation of his insights, he started Refugee Republic in 1994 as an anonymous project reframing the issues facing long term displaced populations. It was initially conceived as a covert advertising and publicity campaign for refugees, that helped change the way refugees were understood by both the public and policy makers. The project posits that refugees need to be valued in terms of their potential rather than a burden and as such refugees might benefit from exchanging methodologies and solutions extracted from their adversarial experiences. A proposed state of refugees, networked electronically would, at least statistically, rank among the top 20 nations in population size and economic prowess. The project logo was a repurposed Rolls Royce logo as a passport cover that was designed to shield a refugee's passport from easily identifying the holder's nationality.

== Kanal X ==
In 1989, in the year before the reunification of Germany, he founded the first independent TV station in Eastern Europe, Kanal X (Channel X) in Leipzig, then part of East Germany. The station which began broadcasting March 1990. The project established the concept that free and independent media could be built in emerging democracies, an idea which has subsequently been acted upon by media NGOs such as Internews and others around the world.

== Diplomachine ==
Gunther's project, on diplomacy, premiered in December 2023 at the Kunstverein Ruhr in Essen. In an attempt to create a 'history of the aesthetics of diplomacy' to counter-weigh the telegenic appeal of war, he tells the story of exceptional moments in diplomatic history when creative and aesthetic solutions and stratagems proved pivotal. Those objects and devices were referenced as ceiling-suspended 3D-prints and projected on the gallery wall.

== Other works ==
Several iterations of video projections on flags were shown in the 1990: "Shaheed", 1991; Anti-Feyerabend (for Paul Feyerabend), 1994; "In the Realm of the West Wind World", 1996.

In 2007 Gunther was selected for Hội An which resulted in a 30 meter long hybrid map etched in marble along the Hoi-An-River, Vietnam.

The Bundeswehr Military History Museum in Dresden features Gunther's Hiroshima-Thank-You-Instrument that was originally commissioned by the Hiroshima City Museum of Contemporary Art for the 50th anniversary of dropping the atomic bomb on Hiroshima. A light flash illuminates a darkened space every 80 second. The viewer's silhouette is temporarily frozen on a wall covered with phosphorescent paint until being erased by the next flash.

The outdoor metal sculpture "How the East was One" (一、二、三＝一) depicting China, Korea and Japan fused into one, was installed at Kengo Kuma's Kyushu GeiBunKan near Fukuoka, Kyushu in 2013.

Since 2015 his fiberoptic sculpture "Seeing Beyond the Buddha" is installed at Tochoji, one of the oldest Zen Temples in Tokyo. It channels the daylight from the outside into the temple in the shape of a Buddha.

== Awards ==
In 1988 Gunther received an art prize from Glockengasse (Cologne) and the Ars Viva prize from the Association of Arts and Culture of the German Economy at the Federation of German Industries. In 1990 he received the North Rhine-Westphalia award for young artists. This was followed in 1997 by the Stankowski Foundation. award and the ZKM/Siemens Media Art Prize. He received the Sprengel Prize from the Sprengel Museum Hanover in 2003.

== Exhibitions ==
- Neue Nationalgalerie, Berlin, 1983 and 1985
- Venice Biennale, 1984
- documenta 8, Kassel, 1987
- P3 Art and Environment, Tokyo, 1990, 1992, 1996 and 1997
- Ars Electronica, Linz, 1991
- Art and Exhibition Hall of the Federal Republic of Germany 1992
- Centro Cultural de Belem, Lisbon, 1995
- Hiroshima City Museum of Contemporary Art, 1995
- Guggenheim Museum, New York, 1996
- Kunsthalle Düsseldorf, 1998
- Museum Weserburg, Bremen
- De Stroom, The Hague, 1999
- Yokohama Trienniale, Japan; 2005
- Iwaki City Museum, Japan, 2009,
- Taipei Biennial, 2018 [ 2 ]
- Art Macao Biennale, 2021
- Pochen Biennale, 2022
- Kunstverein Ruhr, Essen, 2023/24
- Gottorf Castle, Globe of Gottorf, 2024
- Wallraf-Richartz Museum, Cologne, 2024/25
- Museo Banco de México, 2024/25

Public and corporate collections include Obayashi Corporation, Tokyo, Japan; World Economic Forum, Cologny, Switzerland; Autostadt, Germany; Town of Hoi An, Quang Nam, Vietnam; Kyushu University, Fukuoka, Japan; ZKM, Karlsruhe, Germany, and others.

== Publications ==
- 地球56の顔 (56 Faces of the Earth) Shogakukan, Tokyo, 1990 [monographic book]
- republik.com Hatje-Cantz, 1998 [monographic book]
- Gunther, Ingo, "Refugee Republic" (Cambridge Arts Council, Cambridge, MA 1999) [monographic brochure]
- Totalitaetsversuch, KVR Essen, 2005 [monographic book]
- Ingo Günther World Processor, Chiayi County Government, 120 pages (Taiwan, ROC, 2005) GPN 1009402328 / ISBN 986-00-1907-X [monographic book]
- "Ingo Günther: World Processor", Hood Museum, Dartmouth College, 2017
