= AutoMuseum Volkswagen =

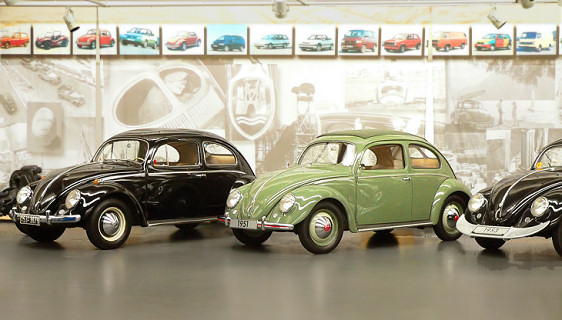
- Established: April 25, 1985
- Location: Dieselstraße 35; 38446 Wolfsburg; Germany
- Coordinates: 52°25′38″N 10°48′32″E
- Type: Automobile museum
- Website: AutoMuseum Volkswagen(in German)

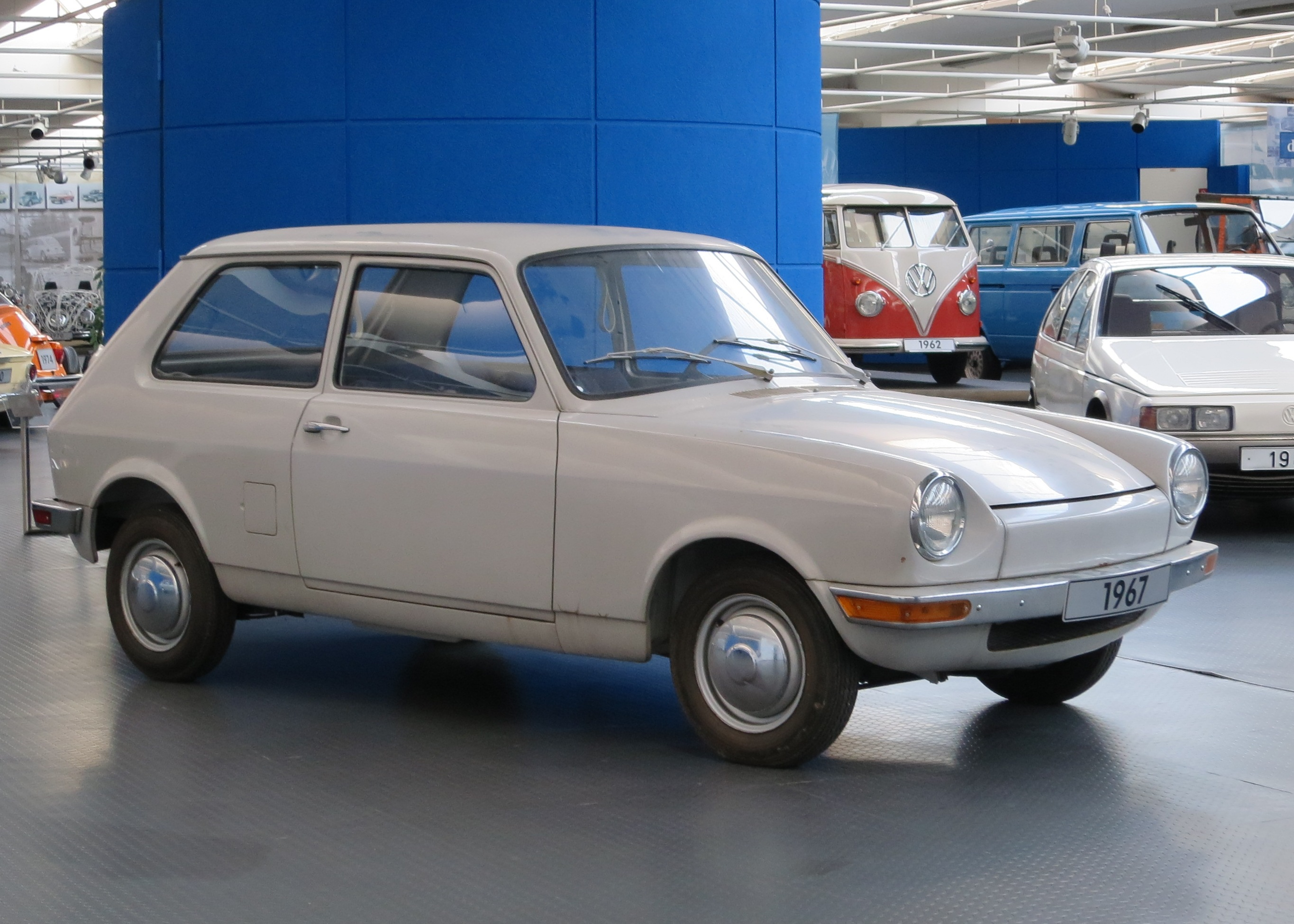
1967 Volkswagen Prototype for a Beetle successor (EA235) on display in the Volkswagen museum in Wolfsburg

AutoMuseum Volkswagen is an automobile museum in Wolfsburg, Lower Saxony, Germany. Opened in April 1985, it is one of two museums in Wolfsburg devoted to the history of the Volkswagen brand; the other is at nearby Autostadt.

The museum houses around 130 cars on permanent display ranging from the earliest VW Beetles to concept design studies of VW models. The museum is housed in a former clothing factory, very close to the Volkswagen Werke, where new Volkswagens are made. Since January 1992, it has been owned and operated by a charitable foundation, Stiftung AutoMuseum Volkswagen.

== See also ==
- August Horch Museum Zwickau
- Audi museum mobile
- List of automobile museums
