= Kanal X =

Pirate television station

- Country: East Germany
- Broadcast area: Leipzig
- Headquarters: Leipzig

Programming
- Language: German

Ownership
- Owner: Ingo Günther

History
- Launched: 17 March 1990; 36 years ago
- Closed: April 1991; 35 years ago

Kanal X (Channel X) was the first independent television station in Eastern Europe, operating out of Leipzig (at the time in East Germany and was owned by Ingo Günther. It was the only pirate television station in the country throughout its existence.

== History ==
Pirate television transmissions were recurrent across the Eastern Bloc countries, mainly broadcasting content that never made it to official state-run channels. The station made its first broadcast on 17 March 1990. The first night on air began with work from an East German video artist, followed by a homemade news report about the upcoming elections, ending with a news bulletin from CNN. The station's signal was weak, using an 8-watt transmitter. Following an initial phase, the channel aimed to broadcast at least two hours a day.

During its second night on air, however, Kanal X shut down due to lacking a license to operate. In its first four months, the channel was on air for no less than four nights. Its third night on air was in May, while the station's story was carried by two West German networks and the East German program Elf 99.

The station continued operating until at least April 1991, after reunification. The legal loopholes for Kanal X eventually disappeared, but attempts to revive it as an official station failed.

== Legacy ==
Kanal X was featured in a 2024 film about local television in Leipzig before and after German reunification, which was projected at the Leipzig Museum on 7 November 2024.
