= August Horch Museum Zwickau =

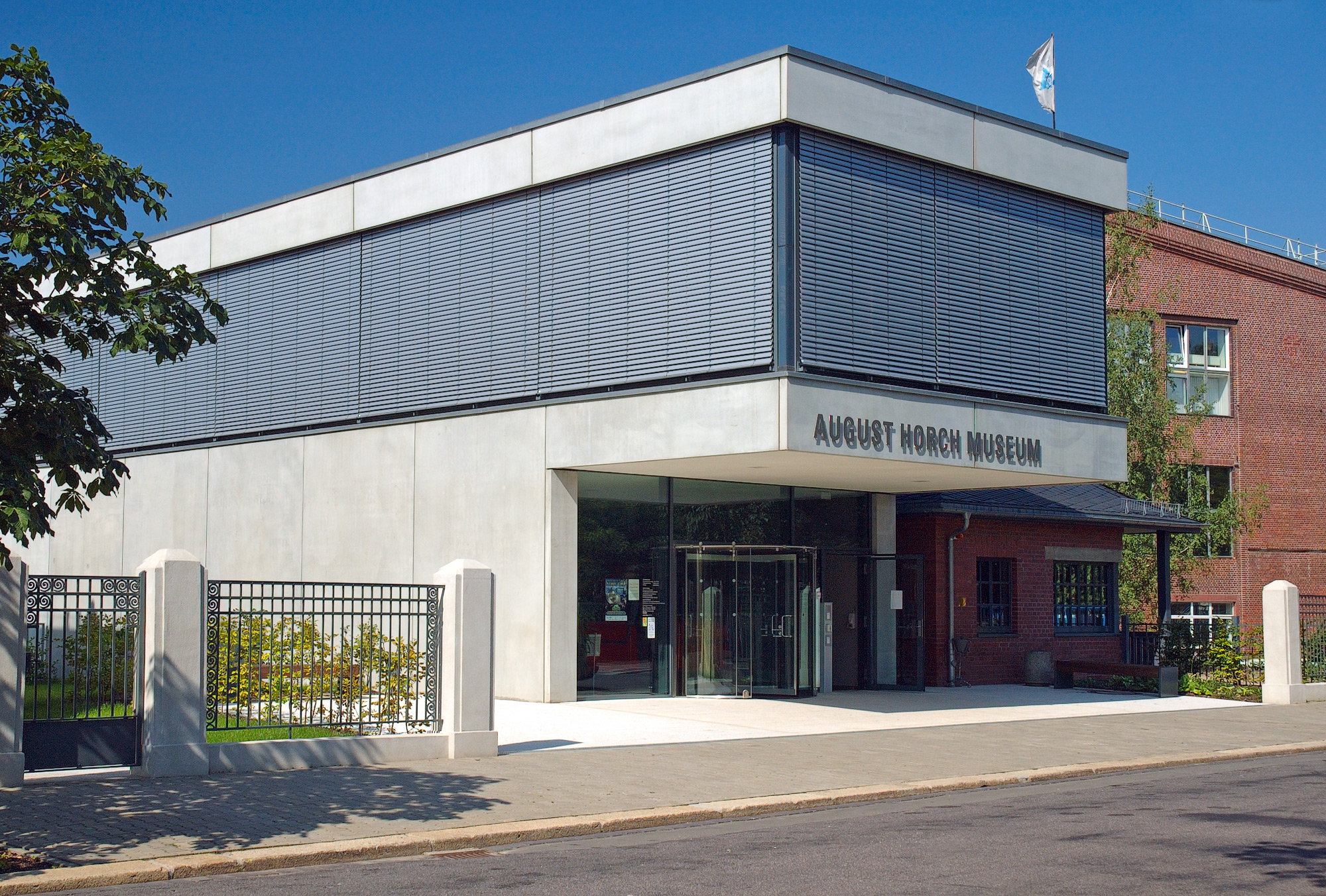
- Established: 10 September 2004; 21 years ago
- Location: Audistraße 7; 08058 Zwickau; Germany
- Coordinates: 50°43′58″N 12°29′03″E
- Type: Automobile museum
- Website: August Horch Museum Zwickau (in English)

The August Horch Museum Zwickau is an automobile museum in Zwickau, Saxony, Germany. Opened in 2004, it covers the history of automobile construction in Zwickau, the early history of Horch and Audi; their eventual incorporation into Auto Union in 1932, and ending with the company's relocation to Ingolstadt after World War II – from where the modern-day Audi company evolved.

The museum also documents the factory's later role in manufacturing the Trabant during the Cold War-era German Democratic Republic, and its eventual rebirth under the ownership of Volkswagen.

The museum is housed within the former factory where August Horch established Audi Automobilwerke GmbH in 1910. Its owner and operator is a non-profit making company owned in equal shares by Audi AG and the town of Zwickau.

== Gallery ==
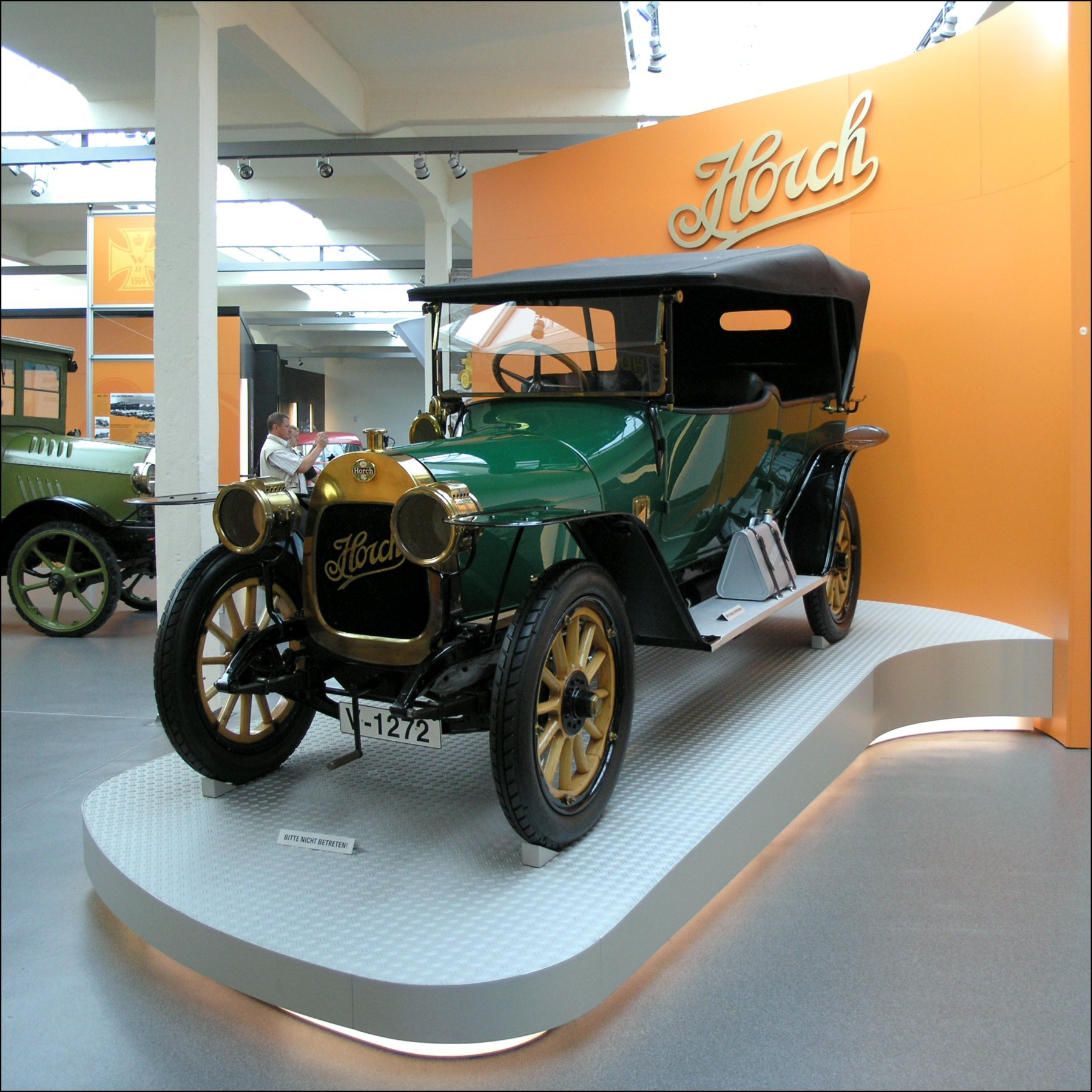
Horch 12/28 PS (1912)

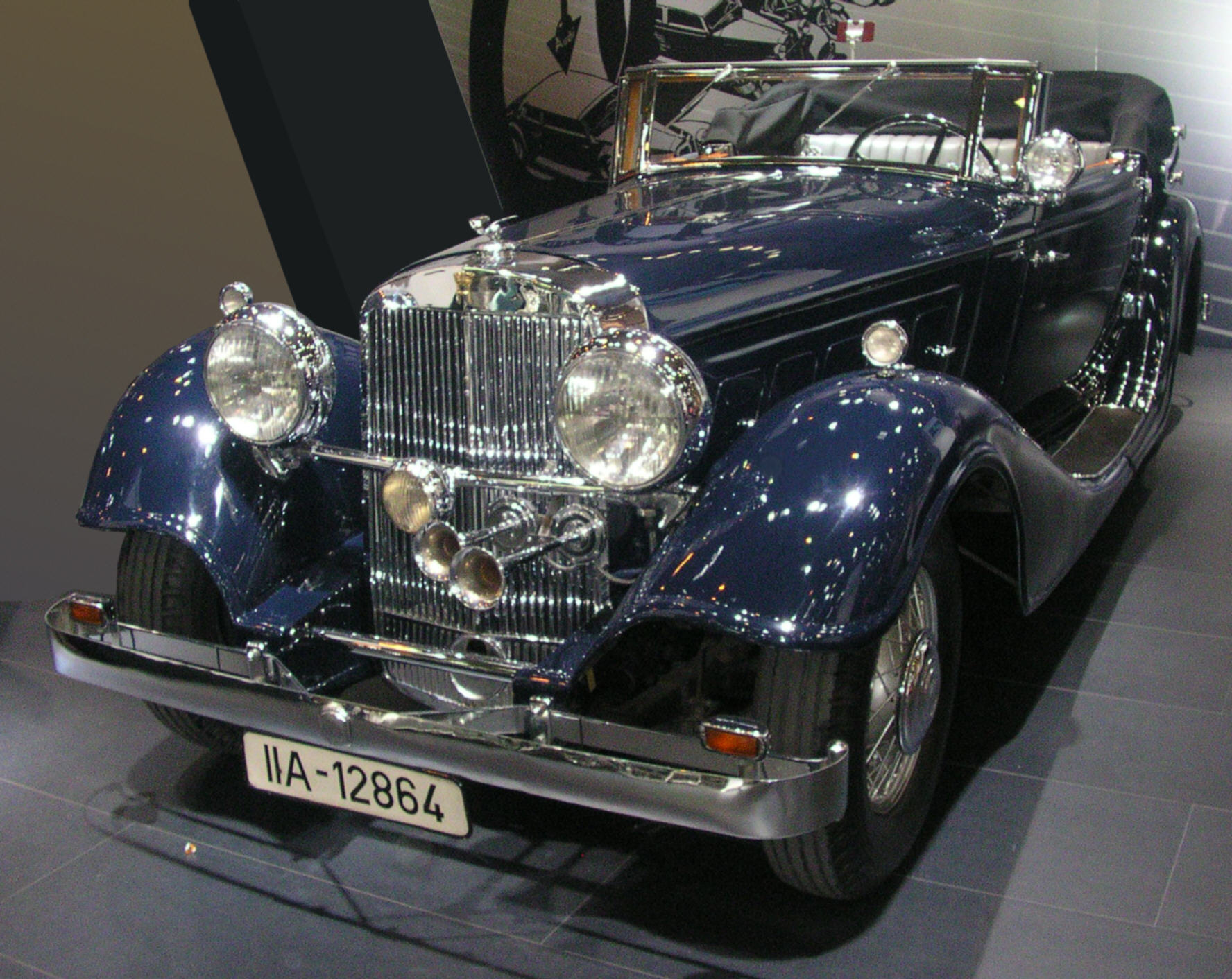
Horch 670-V12 (1932)

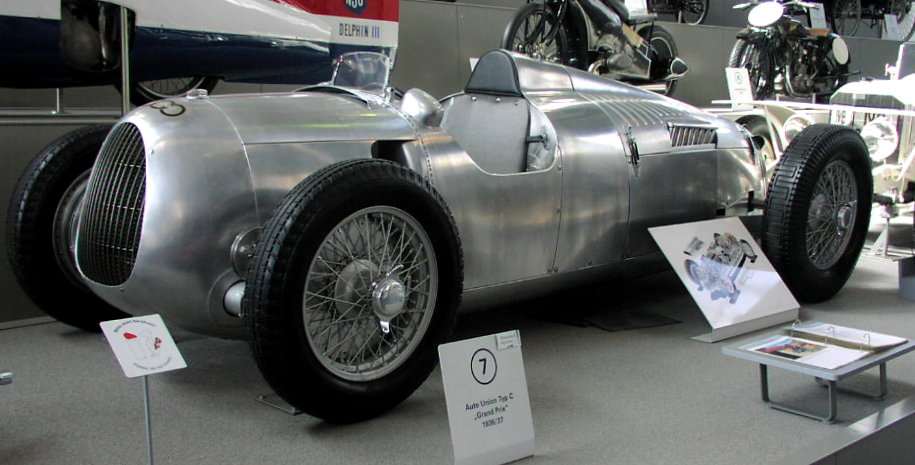
Auto Union Typ C (1936)

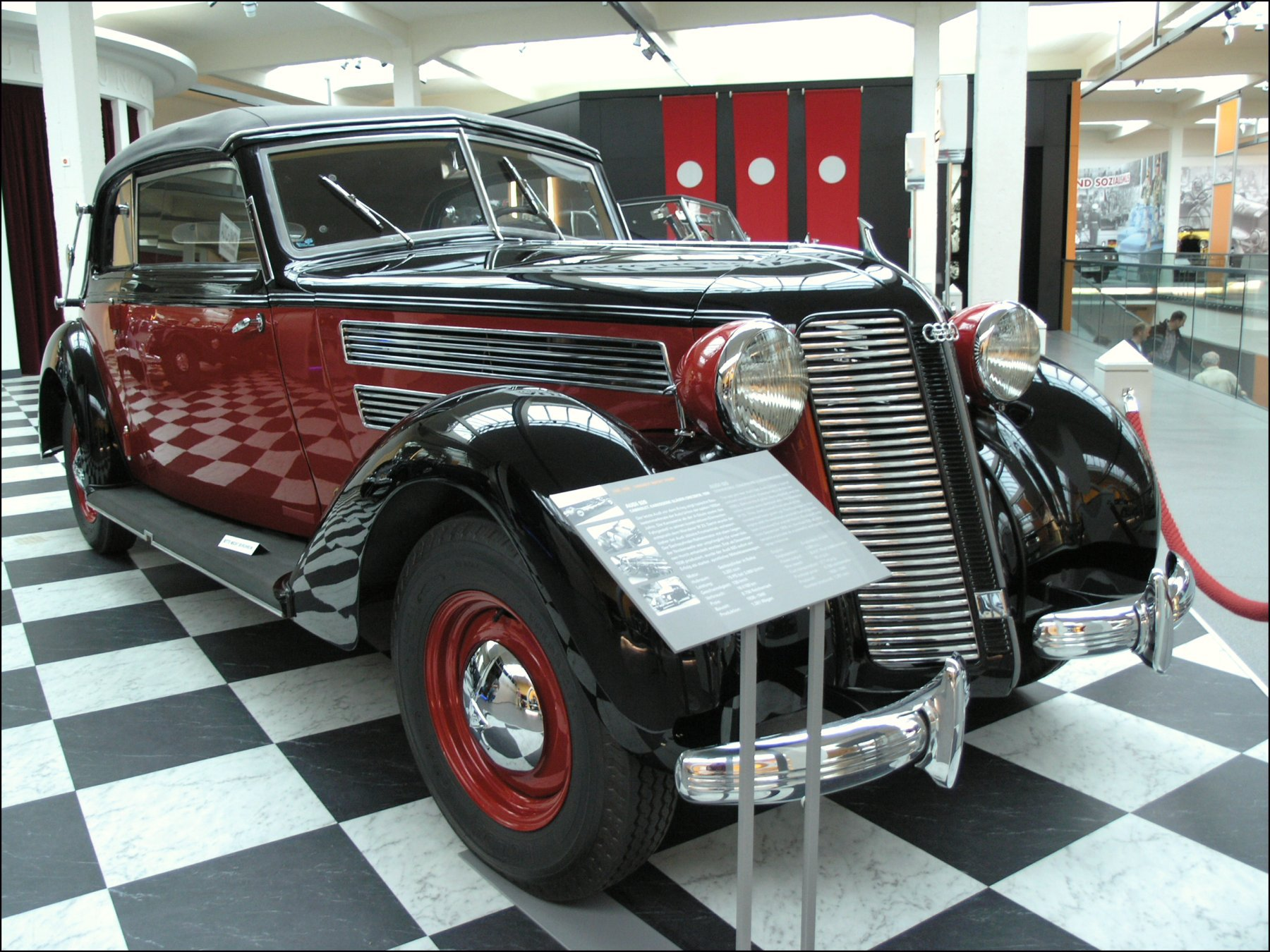
Audi 920 (1939)

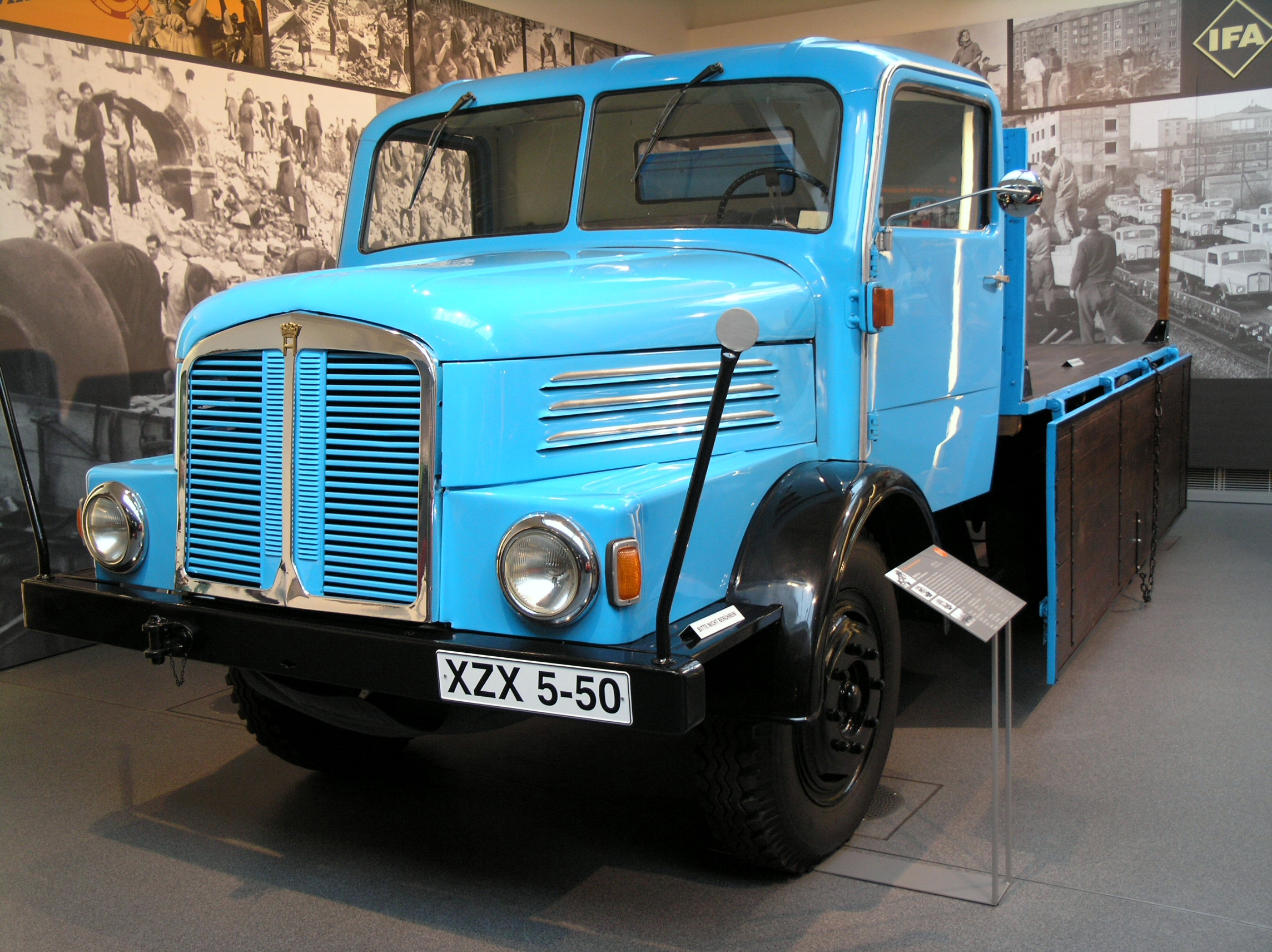
3,5-to-Lkw Horch H3A (1954)

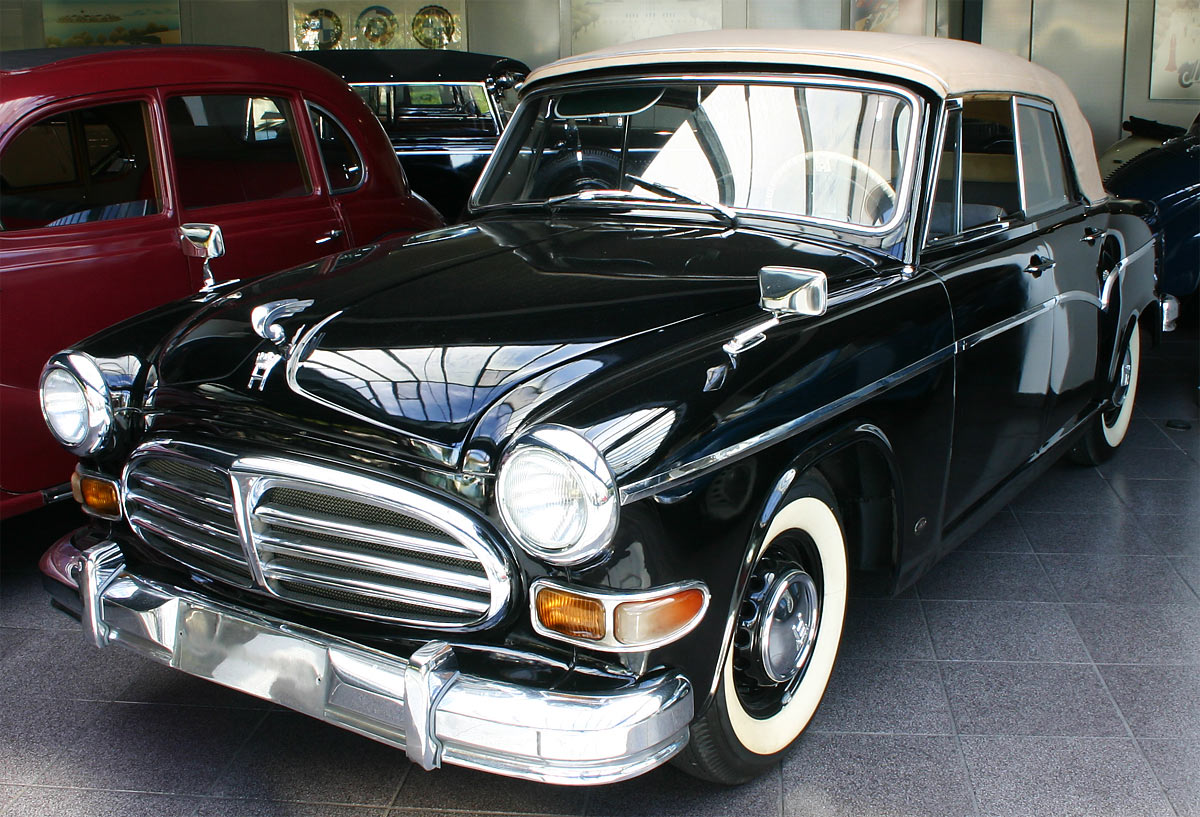
Horch P 240 Cabriolet (1956)

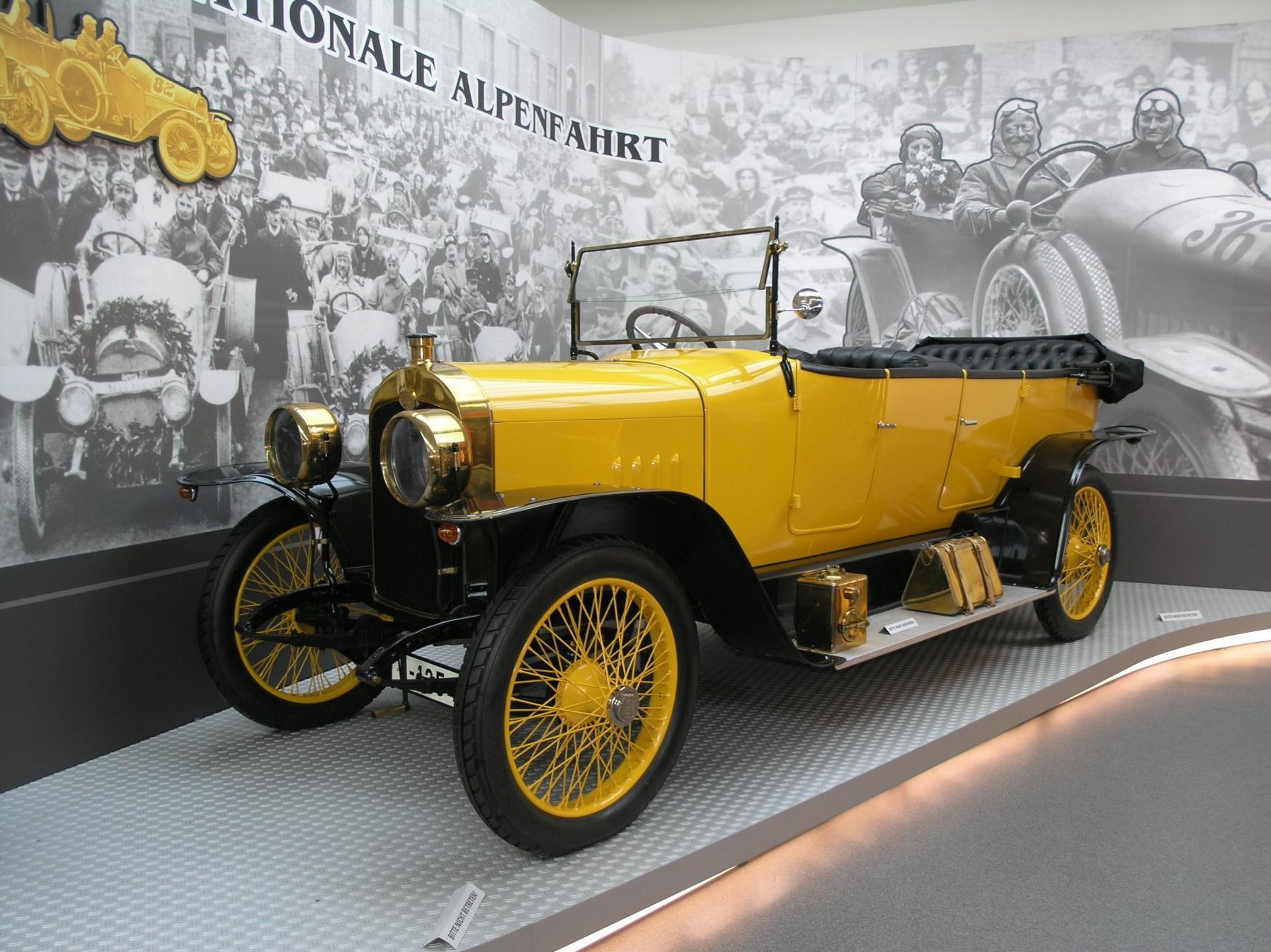
Audi Typ C (1913)

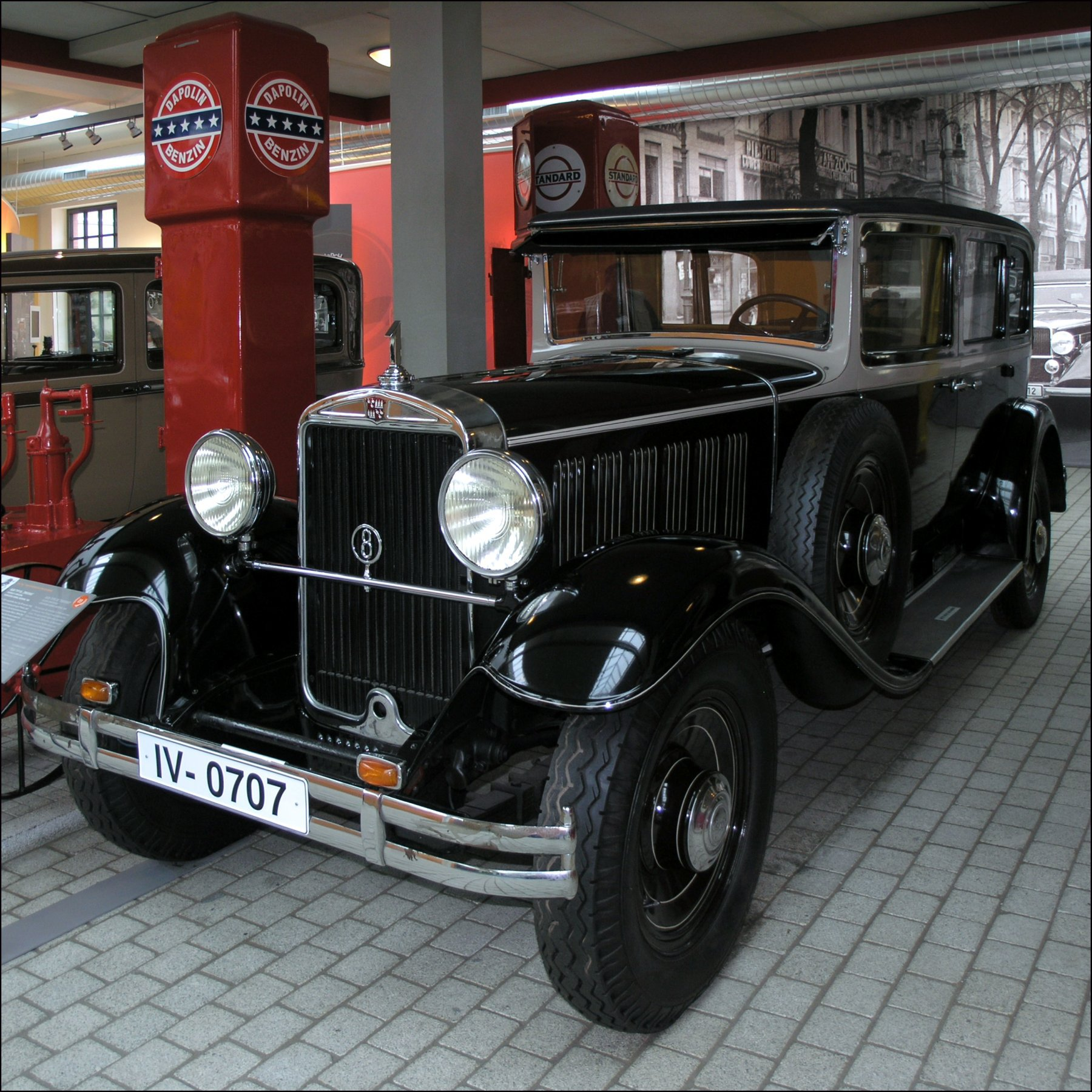
Audi Zwickau (1930)

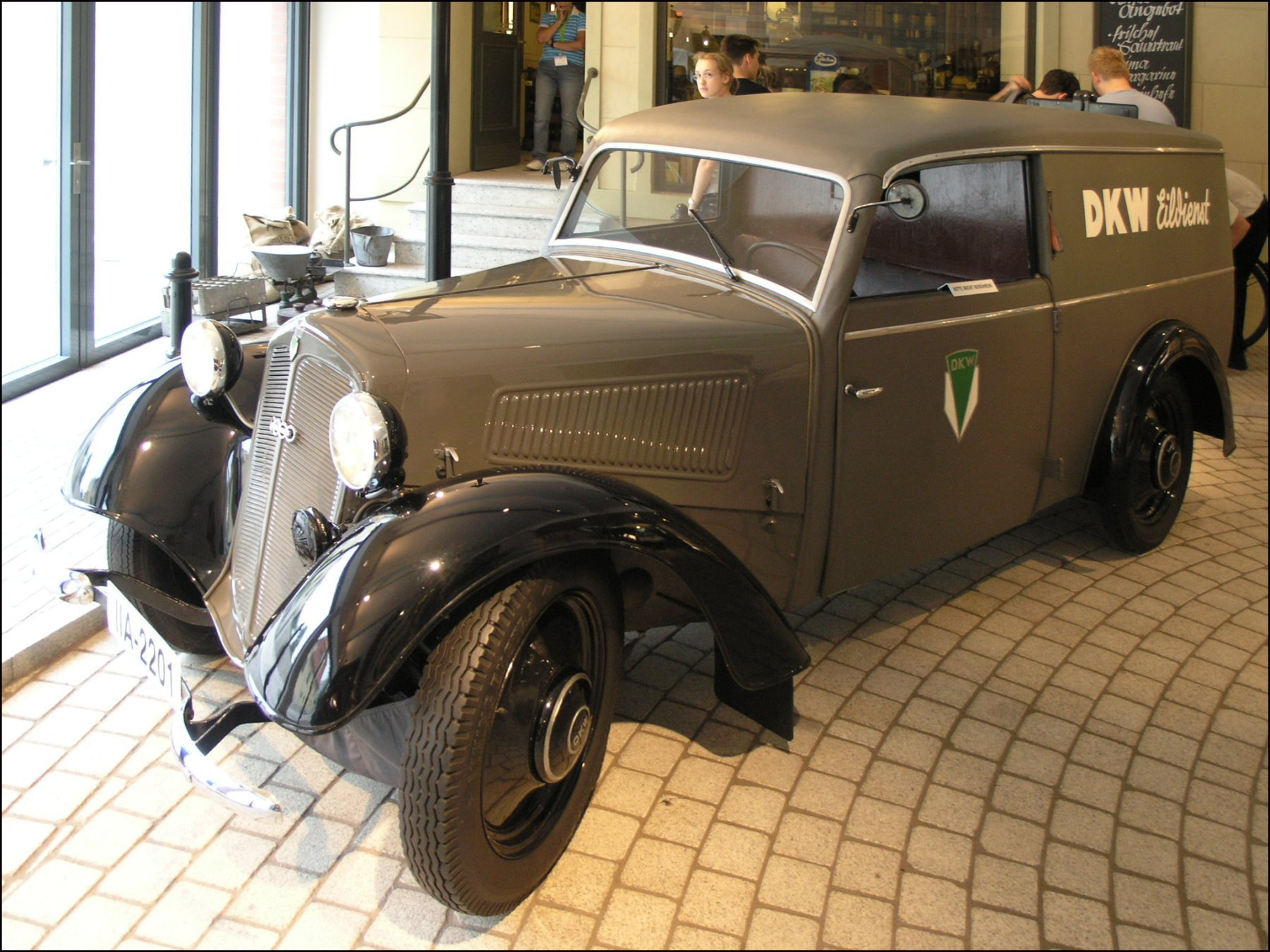
DKW F7 (1938)

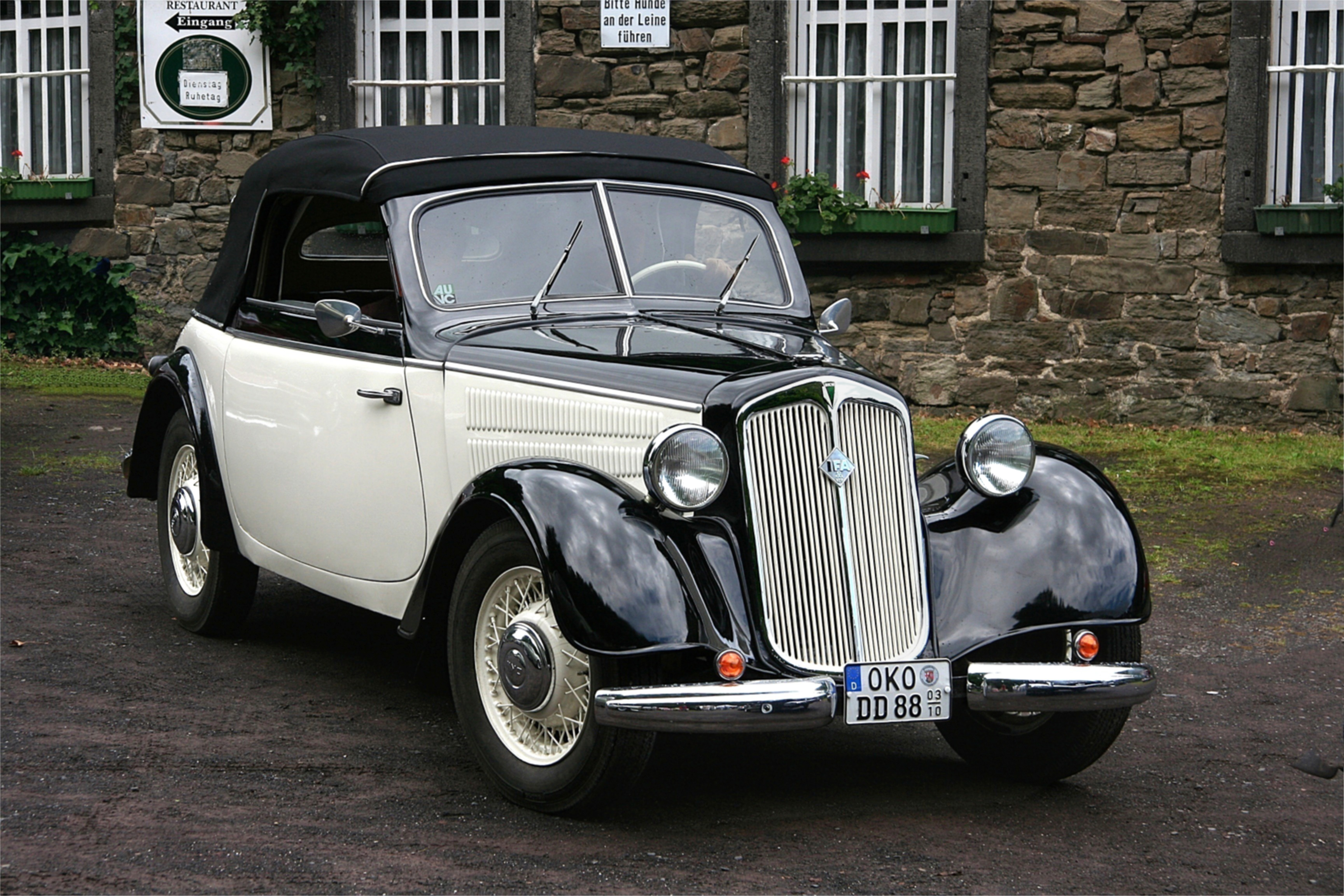
IFA F8 (1954)

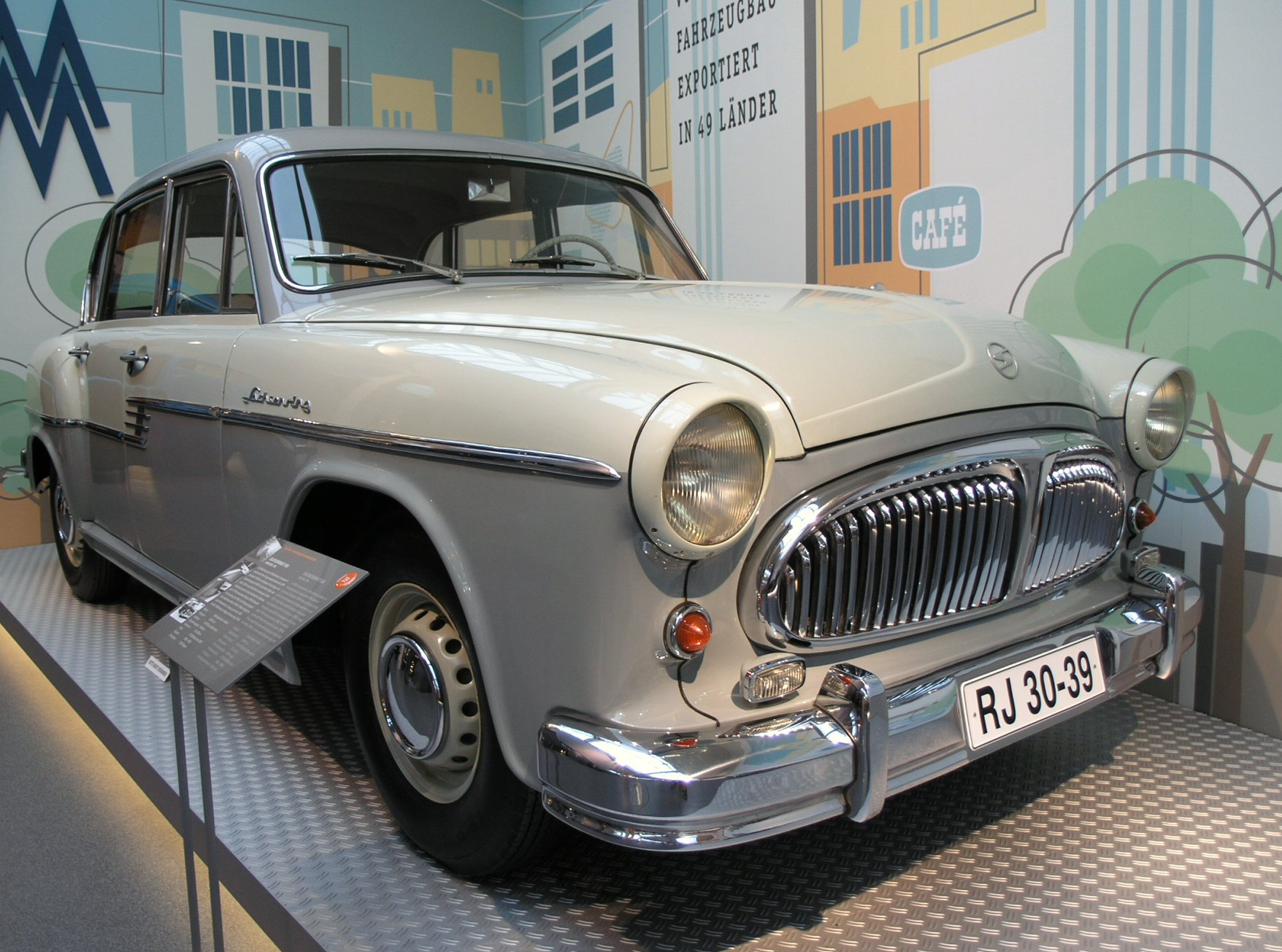
Sachsenring P 240 (1958)

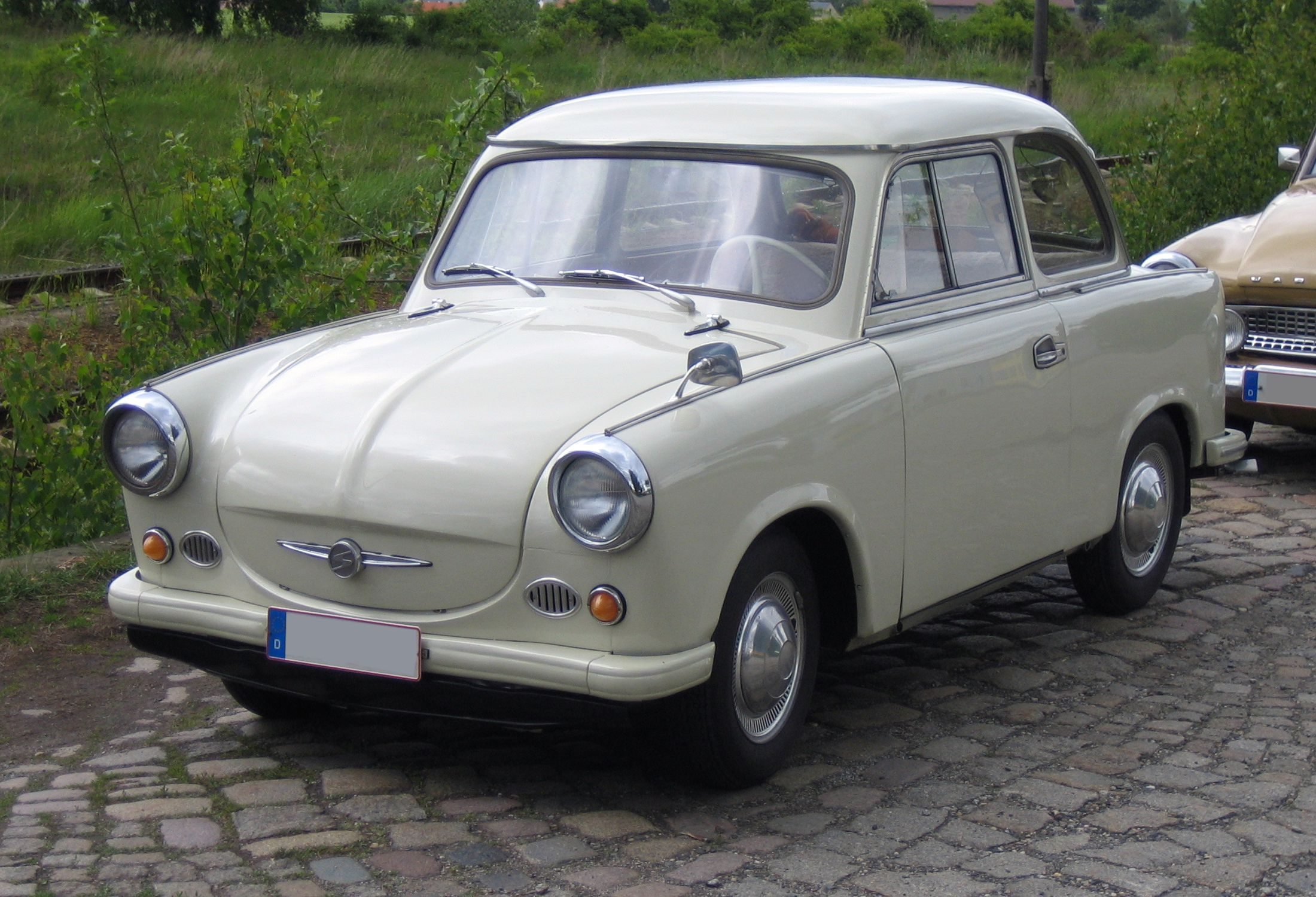
Trabant P50 (1957–1962)

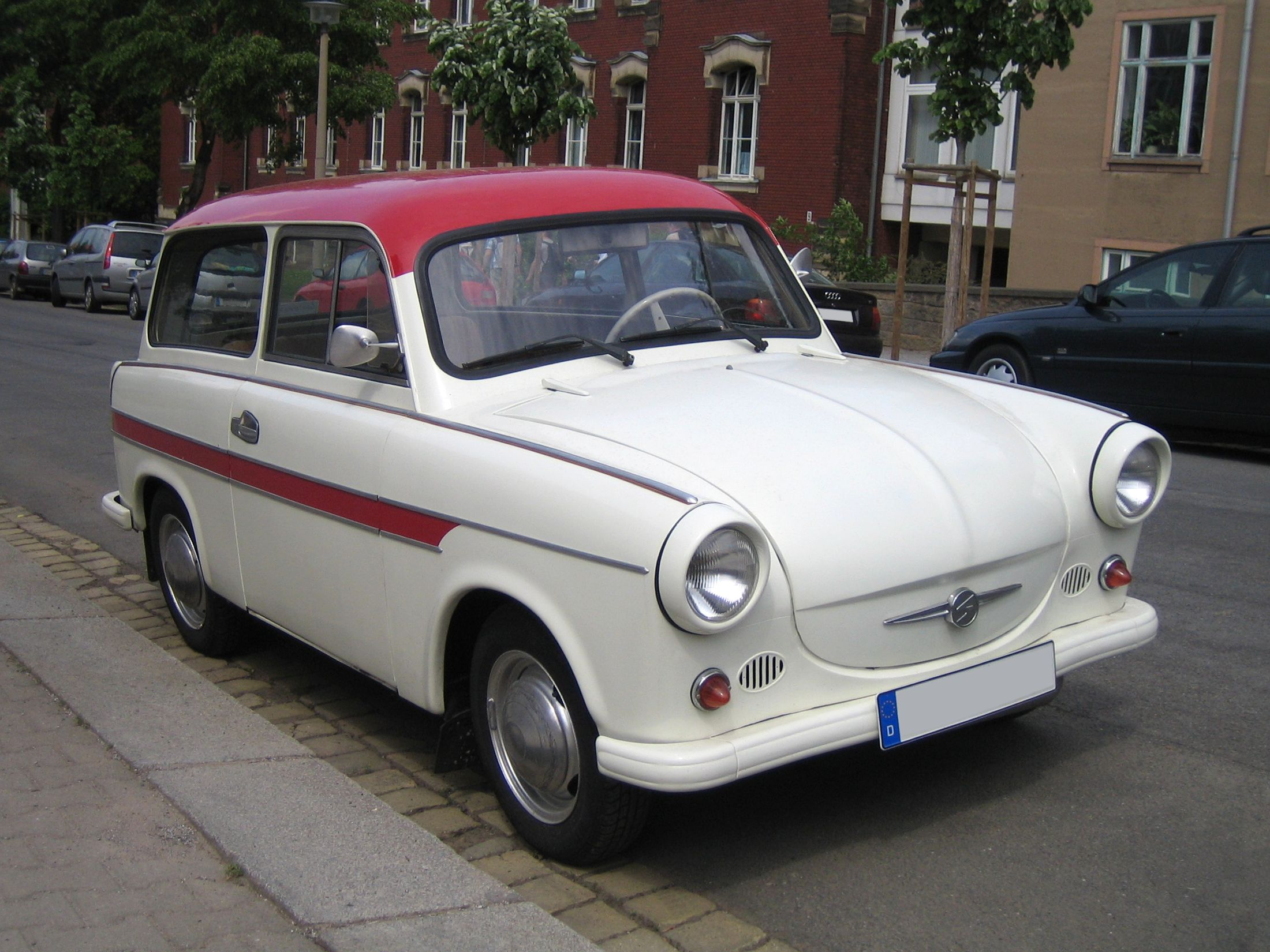
Trabant 600 Kombi (1962–1964)

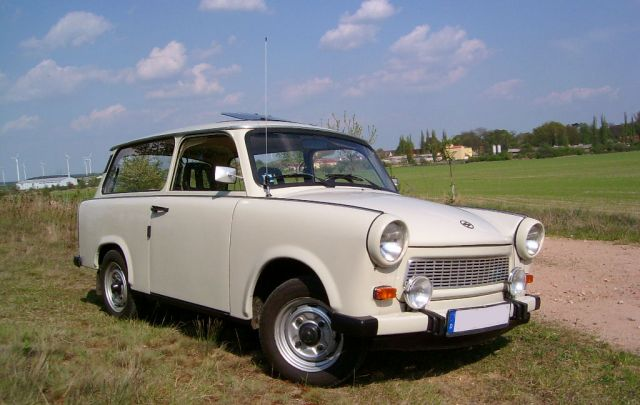
Trabant 601 Kombi (1964–1990)

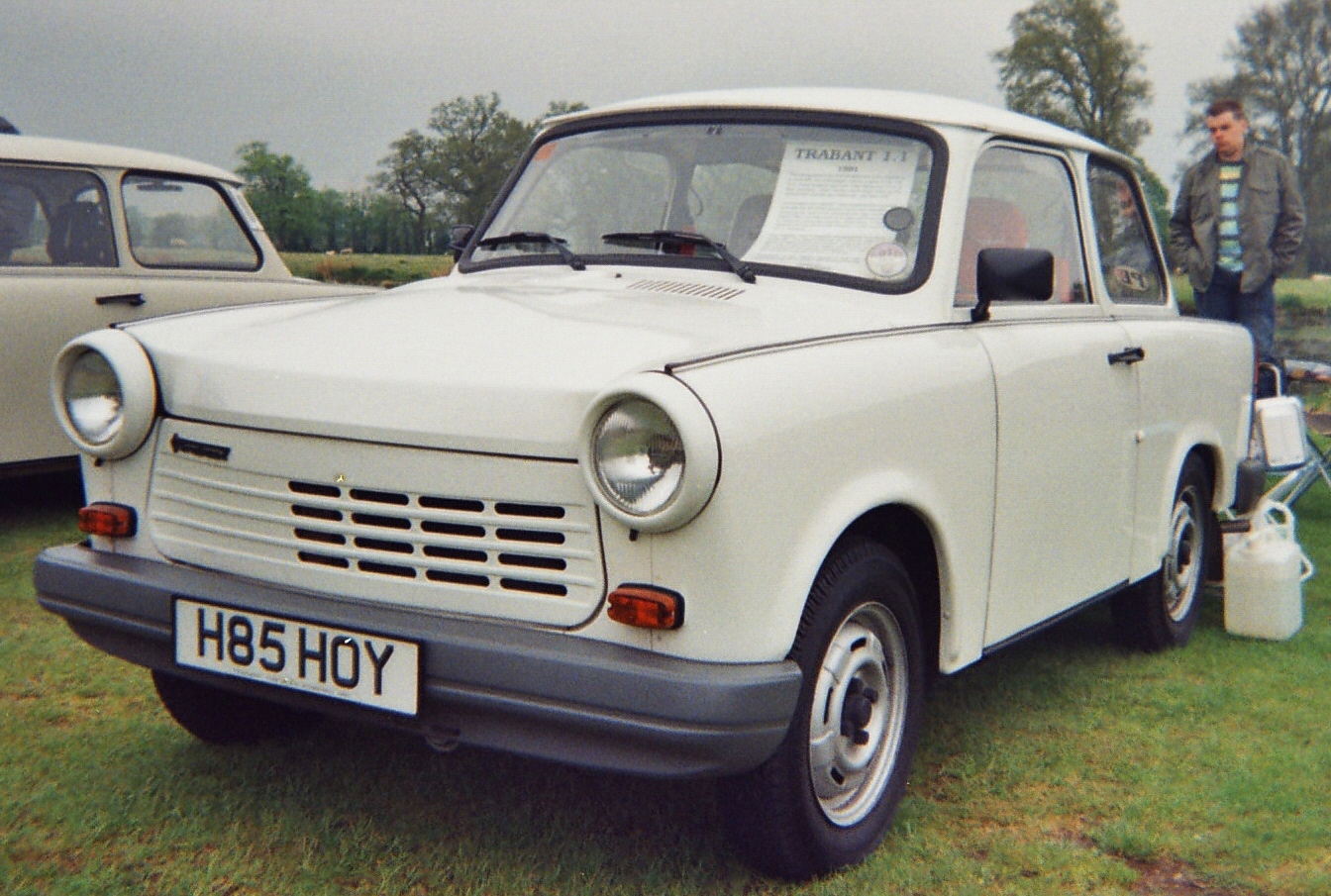
Trabant 1.1 (1990–1991)

== See also ==
- AutoMuseum Volkswagen
- Autostadt
- List of automobile museums
- museum mobile
- Porsche Museum
