= Audi museum mobile =

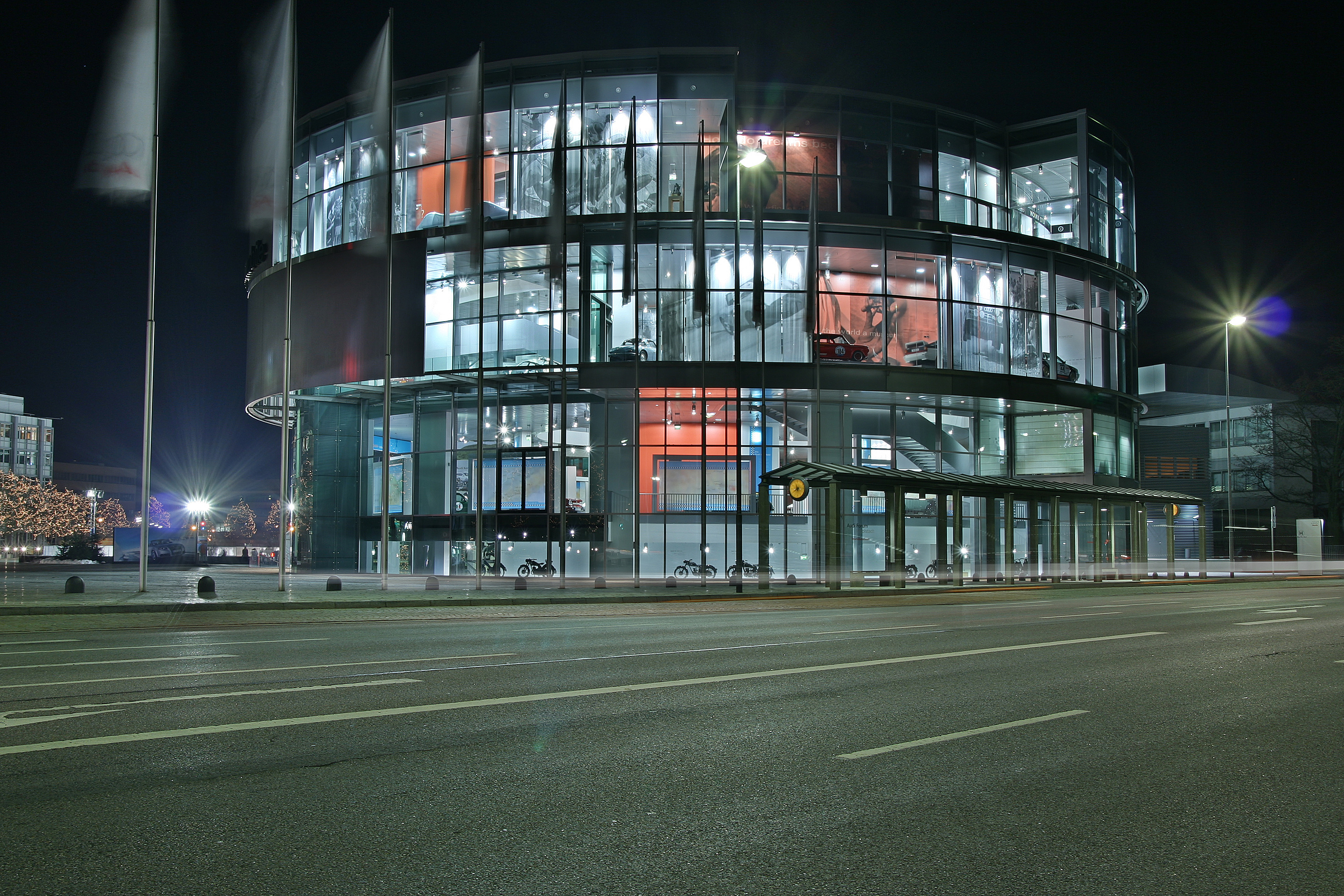
- Established: 15 December 2000; 25 years ago
- Location: Ettinger Straße 60; 85057 Ingolstadt; Germany
- Coordinates: 48°46′58″N 11°24′50″E
- Type: Automobile museum
- Architect: Gunter Henn
- Website: Audi Forum Ingolstadt

Audi museum mobile is an automobile museum owned and operated by Audi AG in Ingolstadt, Bavaria, Germany. Opened in 2000, it is devoted to the history of Audi and its predecessors, and is the focal point of the Audi Forum Ingolstadt.

== Description ==
The museum is housed within a circular glass and steel building over 22 m (72 ft) high. The building was designed by Gunter Henn, and the museum concept was developed by KMS (under the creative direction of Michael Keller and Christoph Rohrer).

Inside the building, there is a permanent exhibition of about 50 cars and 30 motorcycles and bicycles, as well as numerous other exhibits relating to the history of the Audi, DKW, Horch, Wanderer and NSU brands.

A special feature of the museum is a paternoster lift, which displays 14 cars in constant motion.

== See also ==
- August Horch Museum Zwickau
- AutoMuseum Volkswagen
- Autostadt
- List of automobile museums
