= Audi Forum Ingolstadt =

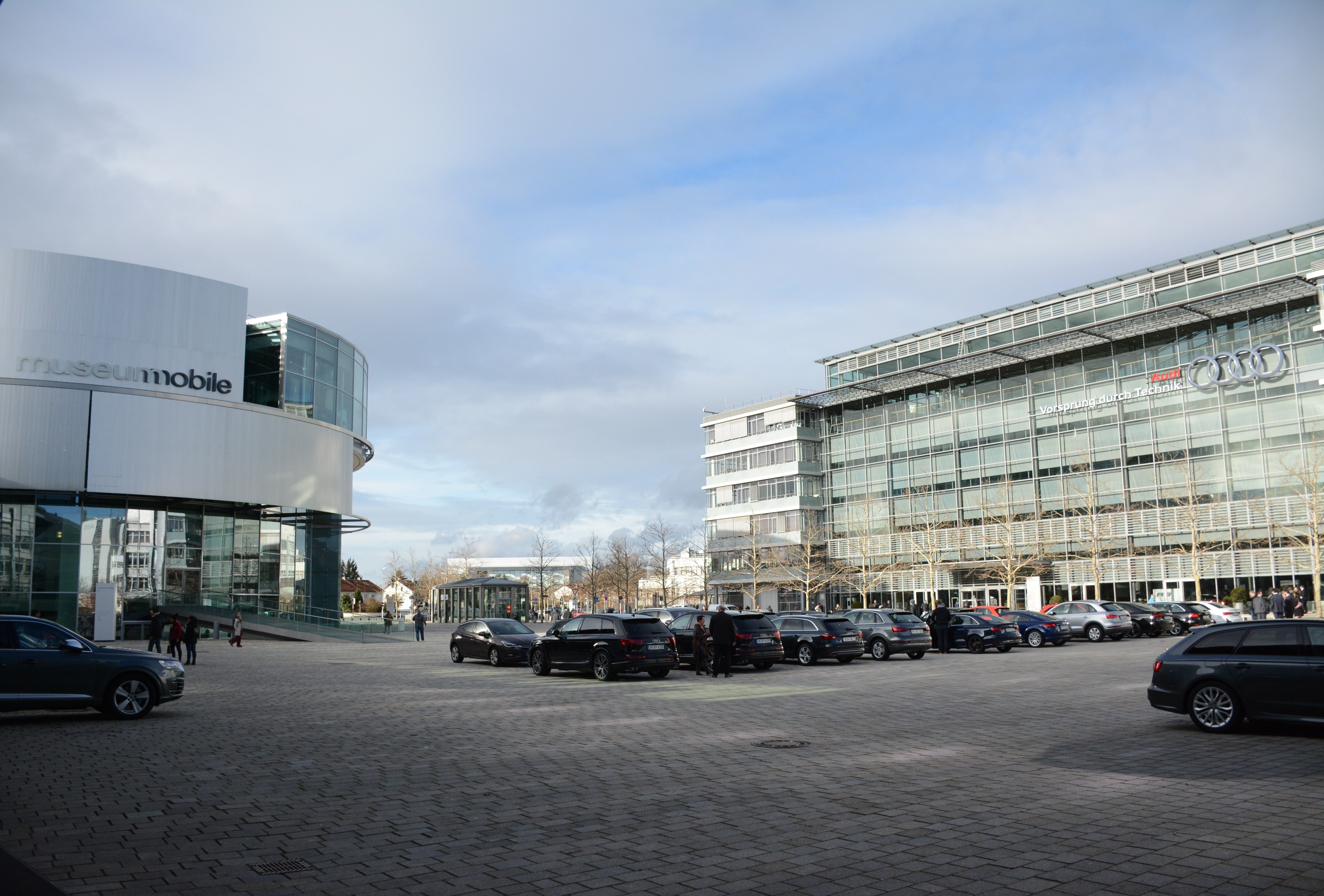

General information
- Location: Ingolstadt, Germany
- Coordinates: 48°46′57.3″N 11°24′53.1″E
- Completed: 2000
- Opened: 15 December 2000
- Owner: Audi AG

Technical details
- Floor area: 77,000 m^{2}

The Audi Forum Ingolstadt is a building complex owned by Audi AG, located at their largest operation center in Ingolstadt. On 15 December 2000, the Audi Forum Ingolstadt was opened. Located on the site are meeting rooms, a customer center, Audi museum mobile, varying exhibitions, restaurants, and an art house cinema. The Forum has about 400,000 visitors yearly.

== Audi museum mobile ==
The Audi museum mobile is devoted to the history of Audi AG and its predecessors. It features over 100 cars, motorcycles, and multimedia exhibitions. There are three floors of exhibits in total, each giving a historical overview of the automobile industry's different eras. A gift shop is located within the museum.

== Car pick-up, customer center, and service ==
Customers who have purchased an Audi vehicle can pick it up from the customer center at Audi Forum Ingolstadt. The customer center was opened in 1992 and covers 2,400 square meters.

The building Markt und Kunde, open since 1999, holds a number of different service areas on its ground floor and five upper floors. Conference rooms, a branch of Audi Bank, and a travel office can be found underneath.

== Restaurants ==
The Audi Forum Ingolstadt hosts a number of restaurants run by the company Mövenpick. The Marktrestaurant seats 300 guests. A bar and lounge is located next to the Marktrestaurant and the restaurant AVUS, in the building connecting the Audi museum mobile and the customer center.

== Audi art house theater ==
The Audi art house theater at the Audi Forum Ingolstadt has shown international films daily since 2002 and can seat 75 people. The art house theater has already been used multiple times for Audi's annual film program and its documentary and short film program from the State Ministry for Culture and Media, as well as the FilmFernsehFonds Bayern festival.

== Events ==
A number of events take place regularly at the Audi Forum Ingolstadt. In cooperation with the Birdland Jazz Club Neuburg, the Audi Forum Ingolstadt organizes an increasing number of jazz concerts annually. Previous jazz concerts have included performers such as the Count Basie Orchestra, Freddie Hubbard, Paul Kuhn, the Pasadena Roof Orchestra, Bill Ramsey, Freddie Cole and Max Greger junior. Next-door, the bar and lounge holds live music every Thursday in the After Work Jazz Lounge.

Debate partners come several times throughout the year to the Audi Forum Ingolstadt to participate in the Audi.torium event, which is led by a moderator. On the following evening, the same event takes place at the Audi Forum Neckarsulm.

== See also ==
- Audi Forum Neckarsulm
