= Fama (band) =

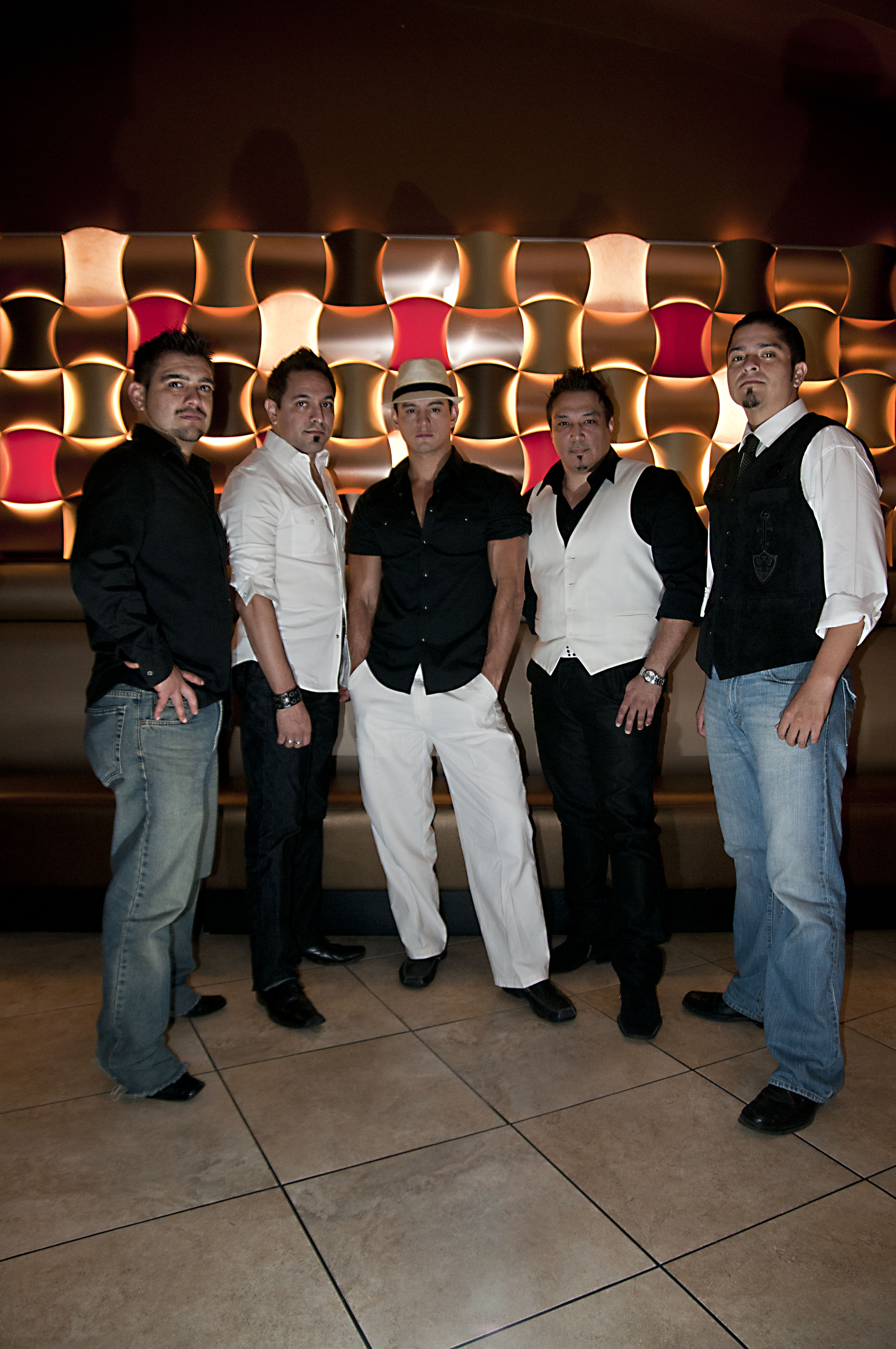
- Fama 2011

Background information
- Origin: Houston, Texas
- Genres: Tejano, Regional Mexican, Cumbia, World
- Years active: 1989–present
- Labels: Sony Discos, Joey, Famuz, AMMX Records
- Members: Eddie Dominguez, Israel Dominguez, John Barraza, Marcelo, Jorge,
- Past members: Jesse Delgado Trumpet and Congas

Fama is a Regional Mexican/Tejano band originally from Houston, Texas. Formed in 1989, at the height of their popularity, the band consisted of lead vocalist Javier Galvan, bassist Oscar Galvin, Saxophonist Edgar Galvan, Trumpet Eddie Gonzalez, Accordion/Keyboardist Israel Dominguez, Guitarist John Barraza, Keyboardist Rogelio Zavala Jr, Guitarist Steve Ochoa, Drummer Eddie Dominguez (1990–94), Drummer Ruben Enriquez (1994–96), and Drummer Joel Garza (1996–98)

== Biography ==
Fama was formed in 1989 by brothers Javier, Oscar, and Edgar Galvan, and friend of the brothers Eddie Gonzalez, the band gained prominence in the mid-1990s with a string of hit albums. They were given the nickname "The Golden Boys" by Tejano music DJs.

Fama signed with Discos CBS International in 1989 which became Sony Discos in 1992. Javier Galvan was then signed with Joey Records and is now under his own label (Famuz). Javier was nominated for "Song of the Year" in the BMI Awards in 1994. Fama was awarded the "Premio Lo Nuestro" for "Revelacion Del Año" in 1994. In 2007 Javier won "Mejor Vocalista Masculino" and Fama won "Mejor Grupo Tejano" in the "Premios de la Musica Latina"

Fama would perform on The Johnny Canales Show in 1993

Fama has earned recognition as one of the most dominating bands in the Latin music industry across the nation. A string of career hit singles came their way in the mid '90s' when "Lagrimas De Alegria", "Quiero Volverte A Ver", "Querer Tu Amor", "Te Voy A Enseñar", "Ojitos Color Cafe", "Amor Perdoname", "Boulevard De Sueños" and "Llorando" dominated the airwaves as they spent numerous weeks atop Latin Billboard airplay charts, earning numerous awards and nominations from BMI, Premios Lo Nuestro, and Univision's Premios A La Musica Latina. In the process, Fama also appeared on numerous international Latin television programs such as: Despierta America, El Gordo y La Flaca, Escadalo TV, Padrisimo, Control, and Sabado Gigante. They are one of the few artists to have shattered international barriers, with 18 recorded albums, of which four were certified gold, three platinum, and one double platinum. Fama's last album entitled "Con La Misma Pasión" solidifies their commitment to their music, their style, and their fans.

In August 2009 Javier Galvan retired from Fama and signed over the Fama name to John Barraza and Eddie Dominguez. The band continues to tour nationally.

May 2010, Fama signed to the record label AMMX Records.

== Discography ==
- 1989 - Amor, Amor, Amor (Discos CBS)
- 1990 - Heart & Soul (Discos CBS)
- 1992 - Como Nunca (Sony Discos) #12 Latin
- 1993 - En Grande (Sony Discos) #9 Latin
- 1994 - Enamorate (Sony Discos) #14 Latin
- 1995 - Lagrimas de Alegria (Sony Discos) #20 Latin
- 1996 - Al Punto (Sony Discos)
- 1997 - Sin Duda (Sony Discos)
- 1998 - Todo por Ti (Sony Discos)
- 2000 - Amor y Placer (Sony Discos)
- 2001 - Te Llegó el Amor (Sony Discos)
- 2002 - Grandpa Got Run Over by a Burro (Famuz)
- 2002 - Live the Reunion (Famuz)
- 2003 - One Nation Under God (Famuz)
- 2004 - Mis Raices (Famuz)
- 2005 - On Air (Joey International)
- 2006 - El Gigante (Joey International)
- 2007 - Como Antes (Joey International)
- 2008 - Nostalgia (Famuz)
- 2008 - "Si Se Puede" (Famuz)
- 2009 - "Un Dia a La Vez" (Famuz)
- 2011 - "Con La Misma Pasión" (AMMX Records)
