= Fama International =

FAMA International is an independent media company based in Sarajevo, Bosnia and Herzegovina. FAMA was founded in 1990 by Suada Kapic as the first independent media company in the area. At the time, Yugoslavia was emerging from communism and entering into a civil war. The authority was intended to be the CNN of south-eastern Europe and to disseminate information about regional developments to a wider audience. Its primary concern was the Breakup of Yugoslavia and the Siege of Sarajevo, paying particular attention to the ethnic cleansing in Yugoslavia.

== Projects ==
The FAMA Projects (created by FAMA Authors/Team in Sarajevo) are the world's largest independent collection of multi-media projects pertaining to the Siege of Sarajevo (1992-1996) and related events in reference to the Fall of Yugoslavia (1991-1999).

Miroslav Prstojevic wrote a survival guide for Sarajevo between the Aprils of 1992 and 1993. The guide was inspired by the Guide Bleu format of Michelin guidebooks. It also included survival photos, taken by Zeljko Pulić, that portrayed daily life during the siege. The visuals were curated by Ingo Gunther, while Aleksandra Wagner and Ellen Elias Bursac contributed the English translation of the guide. In 1994, Sansusha publishers and P3 art and environment published the Japanese edition.

The guide advised on issues related to survival during the siege and suggested "best practices" for weathering perilous conditions, such as a lack of essentials like food, electricity, and transportation. The guide's tongue-in-cheek humor aimed to sustain and strengthen readers, who were horrified or struggling with the violent realities of the conflict.

Harper's Magazine excerpted the guide in its November 1993 review.

=== Survival Art Museum '94 ===
The Survival Art Museum paid homage to the victims' ingenuity while under siege. The museum displayed a diverse collection of artifacts, including jewelry, sculptures, posters, fashions, stoves, and comic books which are all examples of what FAMA calls "Survival Art." These exhibits were shown in Tokyo in a 1996 exhibition that highlighted pieces like the highly reproduced Survival Map '92-'96.

In 2015, there were reports that FAMA planned to build a larger museum in Bosnia and Herzegovina.

=== FAMA Collection ===
The FAMA Collection is an online collection of media and artifacts.

== Awards ==
FAMA received the 2017 Sixth April Award of Sarajevo. The award is given to "outstanding individuals, groups and collectives for significant achievements, and exceptional works" deemed to "contribute to the overall improvement and development of the city of Sarajevo."
