= P3 art and environment =

Art organisation based in Tokyo, Japan

- Established: April 1989
- Location: Tokyo, Japan
- Director: Takashi Serizawa
- Website: www.p3.org

P3 art and environment is an art organization, curatorial office and gallery in Shinjuku in Tokyo, Japan, which opened in 1989. P3 art and environment was founded by urbanist and regional planner Takashi Serizawa. He was commissioned to build a new temple for Tochoji Zen Temple in Yotsuya, Tokyo, commemorating its 400-year anniversary. Serizawa designed an auditorium in the basement of the temple, and devised a plan to expand the temple's activities and explore cultural projects, mainly in the area of contemporary art. Subsequently “P3 Alternative Museum Tokyo”, was established. The first exhibition was held in April 1989.

In February 1991 the name was changed to P3 art and environment to better fit with the actual task and activities Since then, P3 art and environment has spawned 40 contemporary art exhibitions and 70 lectures and workshops. In December 1995, P3 art and environment became an independent entity from Tochoji Zen Temple. The same year P3 art and environment established P3 Management co. as its commercially operating wing.

Since 2014 P3 is now located again in the Shinjuku ward of Tokyo, across from the Tochoji Zen Tempel where it was founded. The offices now incorporate a gallery space for art exhibitions and events.

== Exhibitions ==
Notable exhibitions include Ingo Gunther’s Worldprocessor, (1990); Cai Guo-Qiang’s Primeval Fireball: Project for Projects (1991), Seiko Mikami's Pulse Beats (1990), and Sarajevo Survival Guide by Fama (1994).

== Curatorial Activities ==
Public large scale exhibitions initiated, managed and curated by Mr Serizawa under the P3 brand are the Obihiro Demeter Biennial, Asahi Art Festival, the Beppu Project among others.

== Philosophy ==
P3 art and environment’s leitmotiv can be described in two words: "mind and landscape." This indicates a dynamic interactive formative process between people and the environment, as well as the individual and society. The spirit of time, renewed by continuous interaction between people and the surrounding environment, is revealed by excellent artists. P3 believes in the possibilities to be found in art and presents what is created through collaboration with artists.

P3 is actively initiating and curating exhibitions, authoring and publishing books and catalogs as well as digital media. Research, education, and regional planning and advising is equally part of P3's portfolio.
