= Fama IM =

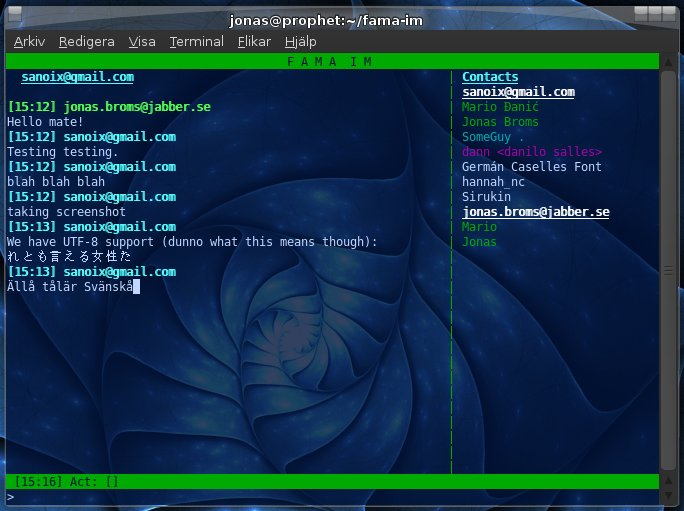
- Screenshot Fama IM 0.0.1 Fama IM Screenshot
- Developer(s): Mario Đanić
- Stable release: 0.0.3 / August 30, 2007
- Operating system: Linux/Unix
- Type: Instant messaging client
- License: GNU General Public License
- Website: Fama IM Project

Fama IM is a free software instant messaging client for Linux and Unix that supports the use of multiple instant messaging protocols.

It uses the Telepathy software framework for server communications and ncurses to provide a console-bound user interface. Currently no graphical interface is planned.

== Supported protocols ==
- XMPP (mostly supported)
- MSN (working in development branch)
- Purple (IRC not working)

== See also ==
- Multiprotocol instant messaging application
- Comparison of instant messaging protocols
- Comparison of instant messaging clients
- Comparison of cross-platform instant messaging clients
