= Autostadt =

Visitor attraction at Volkswagen in Wolfsburg, Germany

Coordinates: 52°26′N 10°48′E

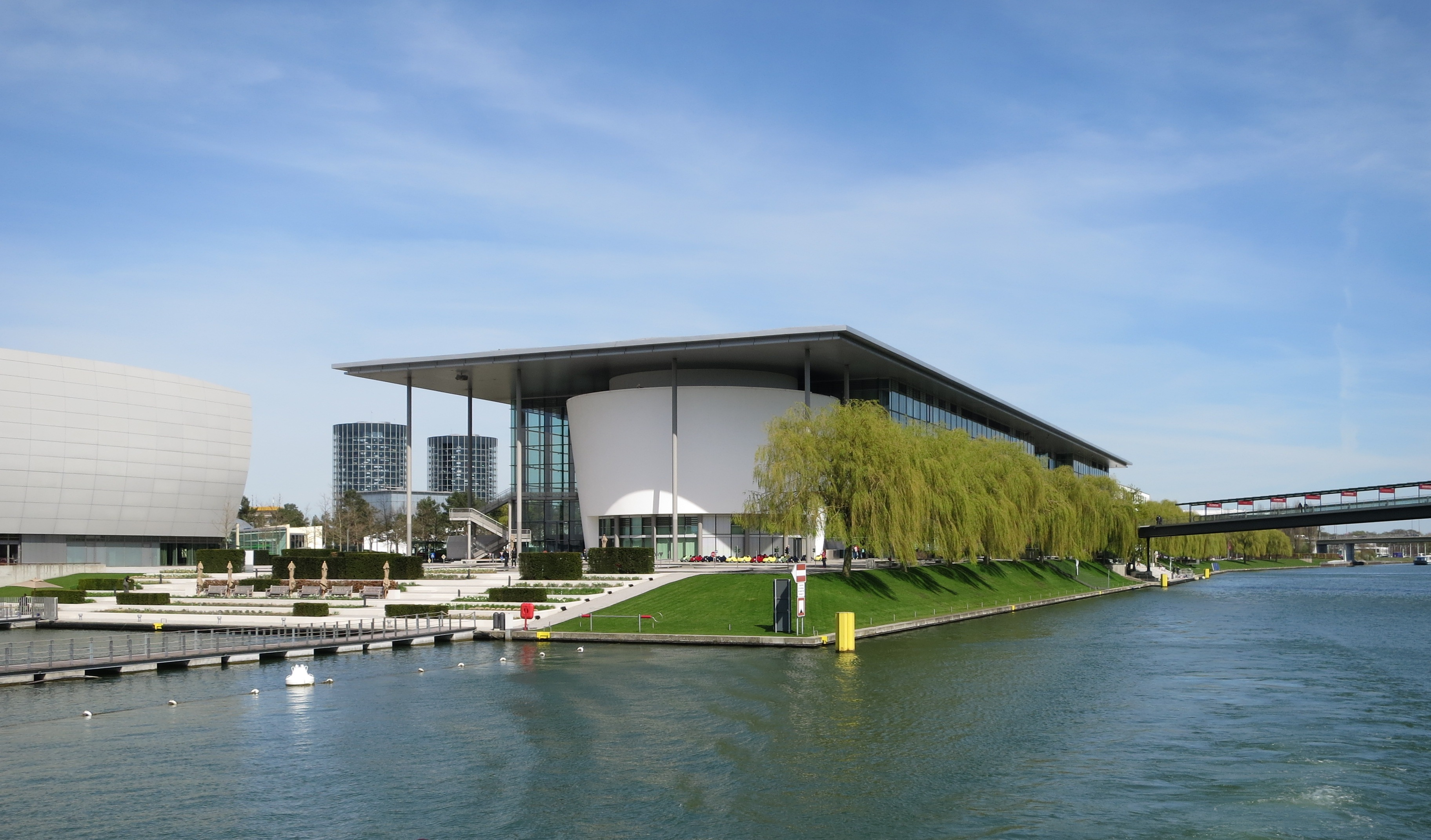
Autostadt: Main building

The Autostadt (lit. 'automobile city') is a visitor attraction adjacent to the Wolfsburg Volkswagen Plant in Wolfsburg, Germany, with a prime focus on automobiles. The complex was designed by Henn GmbH.

It features a museum, feature pavilions for the principal automobile brands in the Volkswagen Group, a customer centre where customers can pick up new cars, and take a tour through the factory, a guide to the evolution of roads, and cinema in a large sphere.

== History ==
The idea for Autostadt started in 1994, when planners conceived documenting the stages of Volkswagen production for what would later be showcased at Expo 2000 in Hanover, Germany. In 1998, Autostadt broke ground on the former site of a fuel company bordering Volkswagen's Wolfsburg production plant. Like the adjacent car plant, the site of Autostadt is on the north bank of the Mittelland Canal. The resulting complex is the work of more than 400 architects, created as a new urban center, close to downtown Wolfsburg.

The main pavilion opened in May 2000 (26 years ago), providing an opportunity to present famous cars hitherto locked in crates to be shown to the public. By that time it was reported that Volkswagen had invested approximately DM 850 million, equivalent to €598 million in 2021, in the project. Autostadt is located next to Volkswagen's main factory which is also an attraction. Every Volkswagen model is available giving the opportunity for the public to choose what they want. Volkswagen then manufactures the car specified according to the purchaser's requirements.

== Visitors and attractions ==
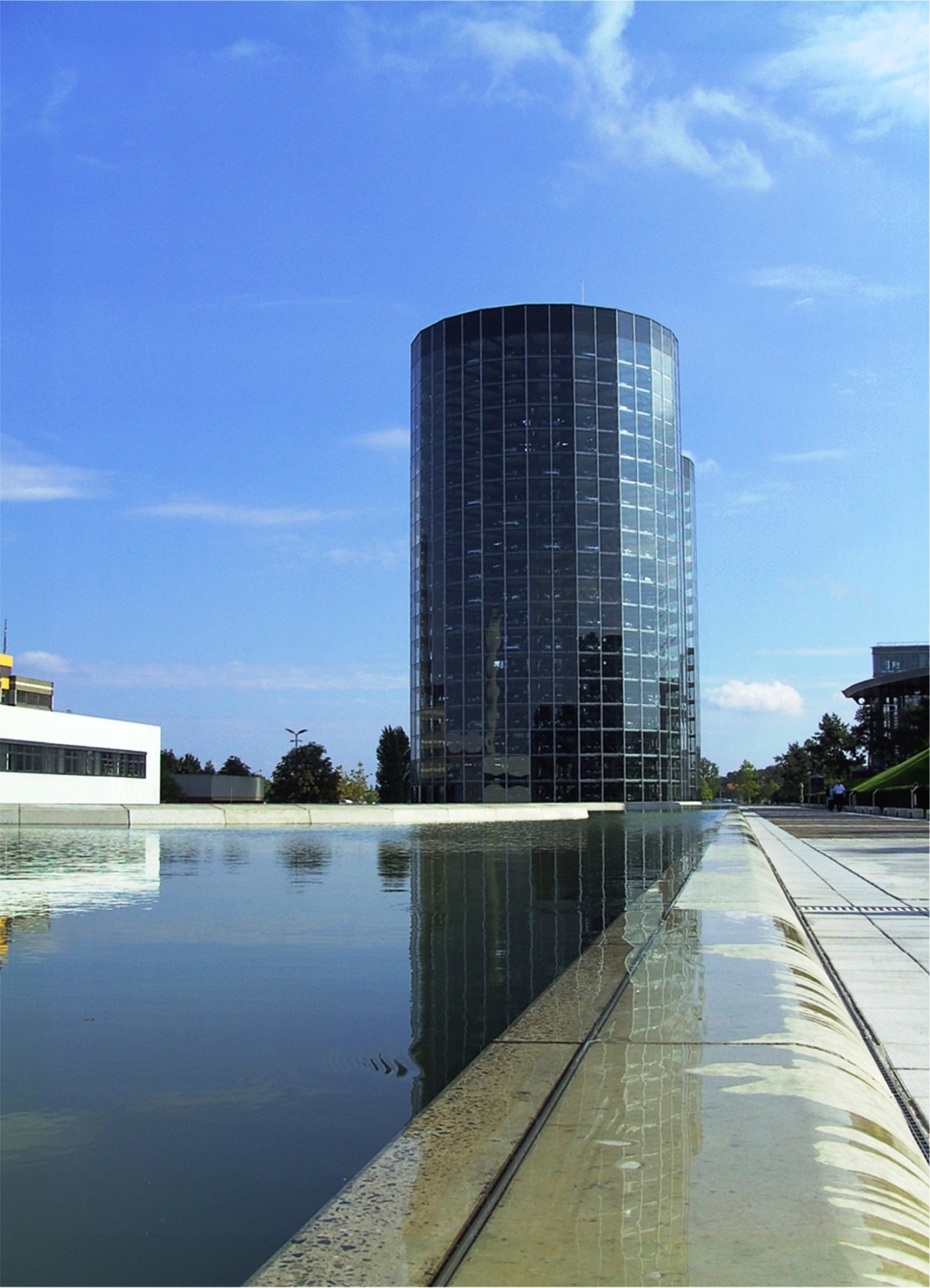
Glass car silo

Autostadt attracts around 2 million visitors a year. It is very popular because of the ultra modern architecture it features in each building. Extensive use is made of water and vegetation between the pavilions and mounds of earth covered in grass are located in the grounds. Modern design is not just incorporated into the pavilions but also into the furniture such as benches and chairs.

It has a small track for the off-road Volkswagen Touareg underneath the bridge which leads from the main town to the Autostadt which is located above the main canal cutting through the city, the Mittelland Canal. Visitors must be able to show driving licences before being able to drive the vehicles. First, the guide drives the car around the track showing the features of the vehicle and giving information of the vehicle's capabilities. After driving around the track, the visitor can then drive around the track under the surveillance of the guide, who sits in the passenger seat. Any other passengers sit in the back. Features of the track include a 21 degree angled hill, another hill which is angled on the side, a water hazard, a sand pit which is located under a road bridge, a log road and a numerous small mounds which allow one wheel to be raised off the ground.

There is a mini track for children where they can drive small electric cars in the form of Volkswagen Beetles.

Autostadt has a large variety of multimedia activities and devices which include car design software. There is a room exhibiting the advantages and disadvantages different fuels have on the performance of cars. There are two cinemas which show small films in German. One of these cinemas is located in its own purpose-built buildings and is in a large sphere.

Major attractions are some famous cars, such as the first petrol vehicle produced, and the Volkswagen Beetle.

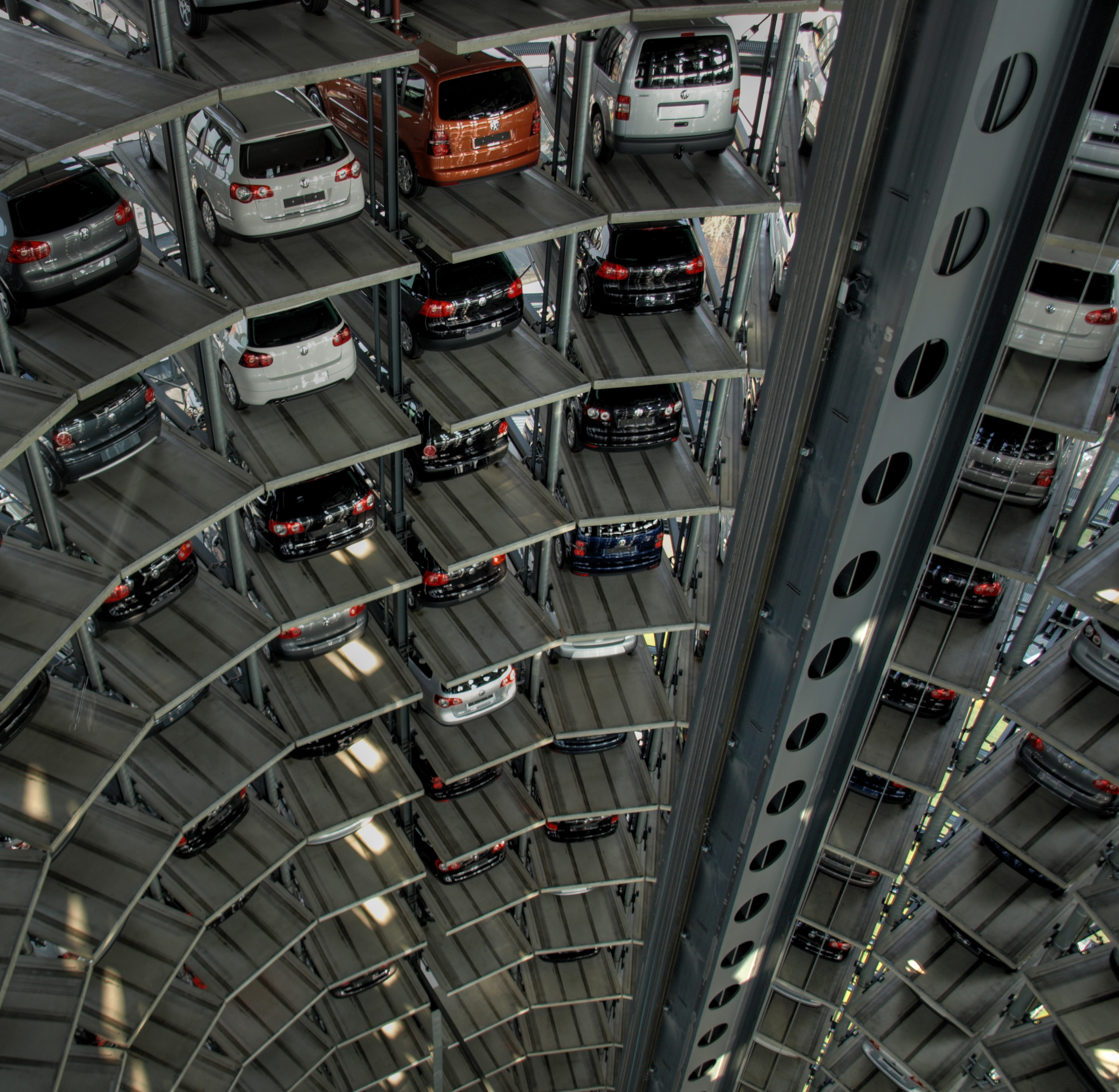
Inside the glass car silos

There are two 60-metre-tall (200 ft) glass silos (called AutoTürme, 'car towers') used as storage for new cars. (Note: The original render for the Autostadt shows six towers.) The two towers are connected to the Volkswagen factory by a 700-metre (2,300 ft) tunnel. When cars arrive at the towers they are carried up at a speed of 1.5 metres (4 ft 11 in) per second. When purchasing a car from Volkswagen (the main brand only, not the sub-brands) in select European countries, the customer gets to decide whether they want it delivered to the dealership where they bought it or travel to Autostadt to pick it up there. If the latter is chosen, the Autostadt supplies the customer with free entrance, meal tickets and a variety of events building up to the point where the customer can follow on screen as the automatic elevator picks up the selected car in one of the silos. The car is then transported out to the customer without having driven a single metre outside the factory and the odometer thus reads zero.

There is also a room with interactive devices which provide information on the design of cars using Audi as an example. Computer software allows visitors to design their own cars using features from Audi cars.

== Pavilions at Autostadt ==
There are seven pavilions dedicated to car manufacturers at Autostadt.

=== Volkswagen production and development ===
There are two pavilions for Volkswagen, one of them dedicated to commercial vehicles.

The Volkswagen development pavilion is the largest in ground area of all pavilions at Autostadt. The pavilion is circular in shape and has two floors which display all models in the Volkswagen range plus a shop of Volkswagen articles of clothing, die cast models and vehicle accessories which is located on the top floor.

The production pavilion is the smallest and one of the last of the pavilions to be constructed. It was not included in the original rendering of Autostadt.

=== Porsche ===
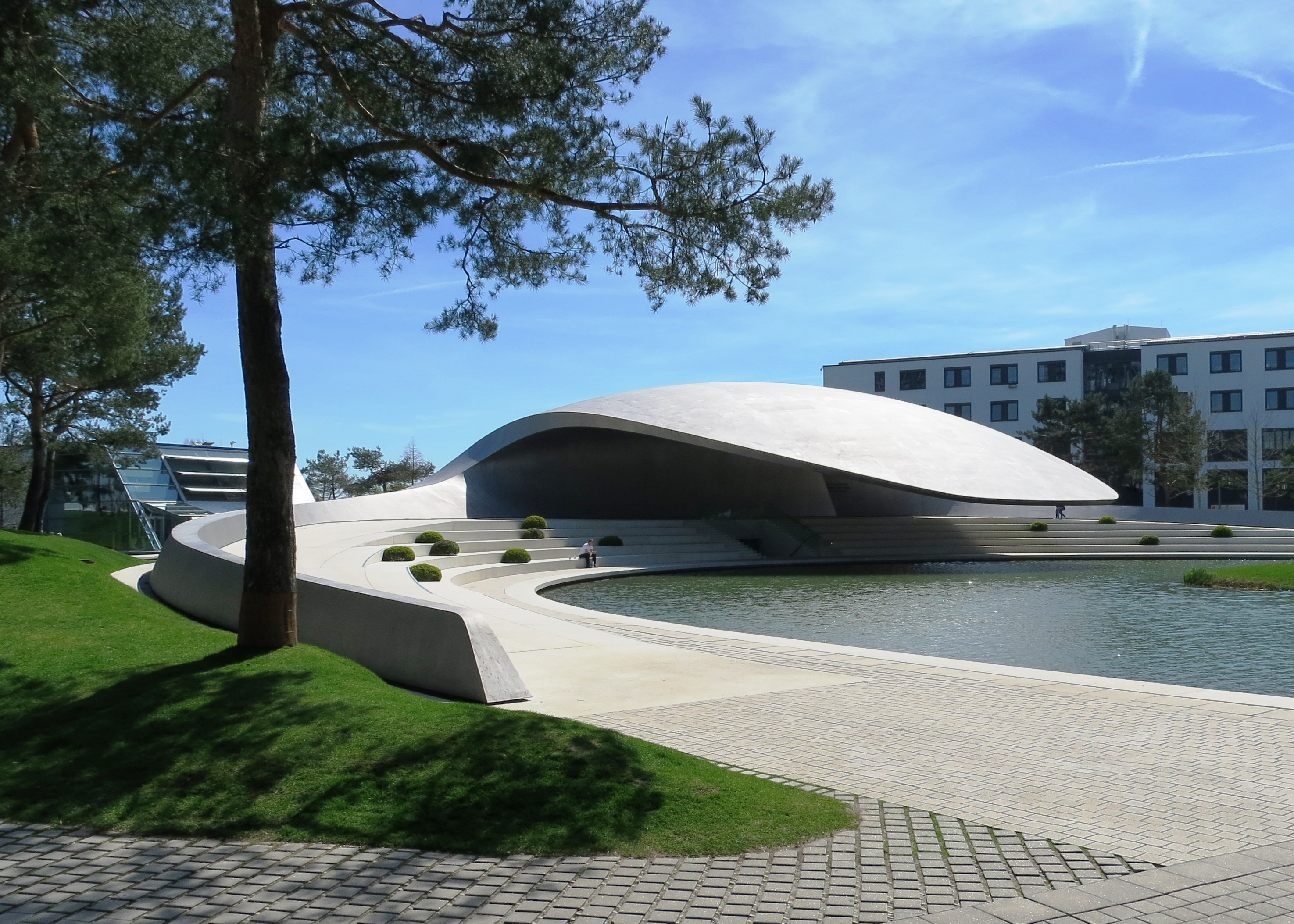
The Porsche pavilion

The Porsche pavilion is circular-shaped, the interior design is simple yet elegant. The visitors enter on a descending curved corridor entering the only hall of the pavilion. There are three models on display, a Boxster, a 911 and a Panamera. Behind them there are small models of the previous cars in the history of the marque with the oldest displayed with the smallest and the generation just before the current one the biggest in scale. Next to the cars on display, there is a black couch fitted with iPads running an app which shows the history of Porsche with pictures and videos on the former generations.

=== Premium Clubhouse (formerly Bentley) ===
The pavilion is built into a small hill. It has a marble roof and the entrance is cut into the side of the grass-covered mound. The exit is on the opposite side of the pavilion. It was designed by KSS Architects.

The pavilion visit began with an escalator with a film either side documenting cars produced by Bentley since the creation of the company. There was then a spiralling walkway which descends around a rotating displays of cogs illuminated by coloured lights which changed throughout. Television screens of varying sizes were located around this contraption which showed different videos of their vehicle's performance.

The Bentley pavilion was renamed in 2008, now being shared with the Bugatti brand and renamed the "Premium Clubhouse".

The displays include a Bugatti Veyron with a special chrome finish and separately, an engine from the same car model.

=== Škoda ===
The Škoda pavilion consists of a number of metal sculptures. It shows several examples of cars produced under the Škoda brand and small models of all types ever produced in Škoda's history. Like in other brand pavilions it is possible to open and enter the cars to get a feeling for them. Information about engine specifications, prices and fuel consumption are next to each car.

=== Lamborghini ===
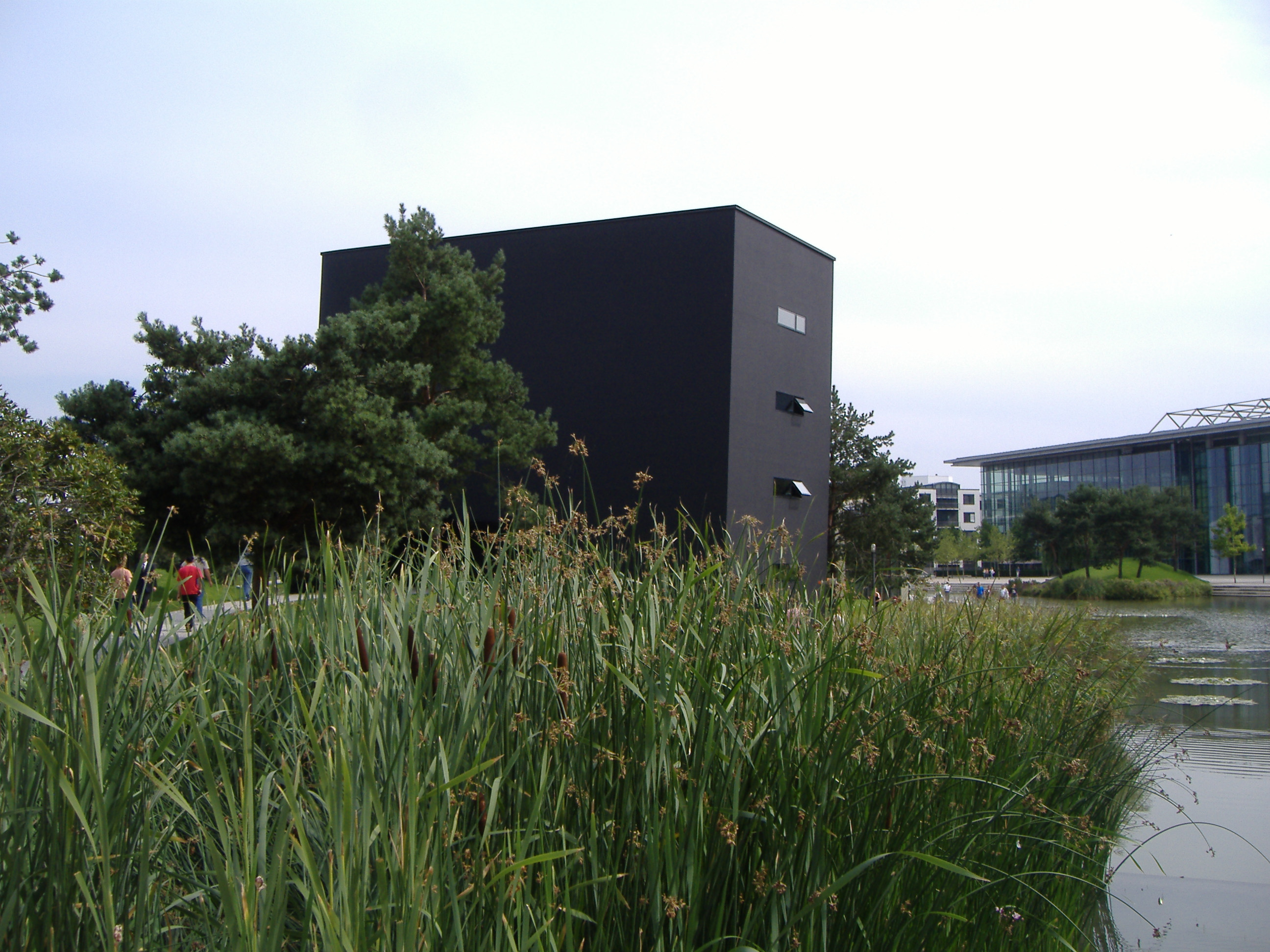
The Lamborghini pavilion. On the other side is a circular platform which rotates during the show inside and a Murcielago appears on the outside.

The building is completely black and a show with an orange Lamborghini Aventador attached to the wall greets visitors. During the show, the lights dim and dry ice floods the room before finally diminishing, revealing that the car has disappeared from the wall. During this, the car which sits on a vertical platform has been rotated 180 degrees and sits on the outside of the building.

=== Audi ===
The building is large and has a unique "sphere-guide". Each visitor gets a small plastic sphere which they first have to activate by giving their name and taking a photo with the help of wall-mounted touchscreens at the entrance. Then through the way in the pavilion, the sphere lights up with the same color as the design of the current section and visitors can push their spheres onto special hemisphere depressions on the wall thus for example launching a video about some technical information on the wall mounted displays, light up a real Audi headlight placed behind a piece of glass in the wall or creating an illusion of charging an electric A1 by floor-mounted lights. Visitors can get into the vehicles on display including an R8. At the end of the tour visitors can send their photo made at the entrance in e-mail or post it to social networking sites after dropping the sphere in the collecting pit.

=== SEAT ===
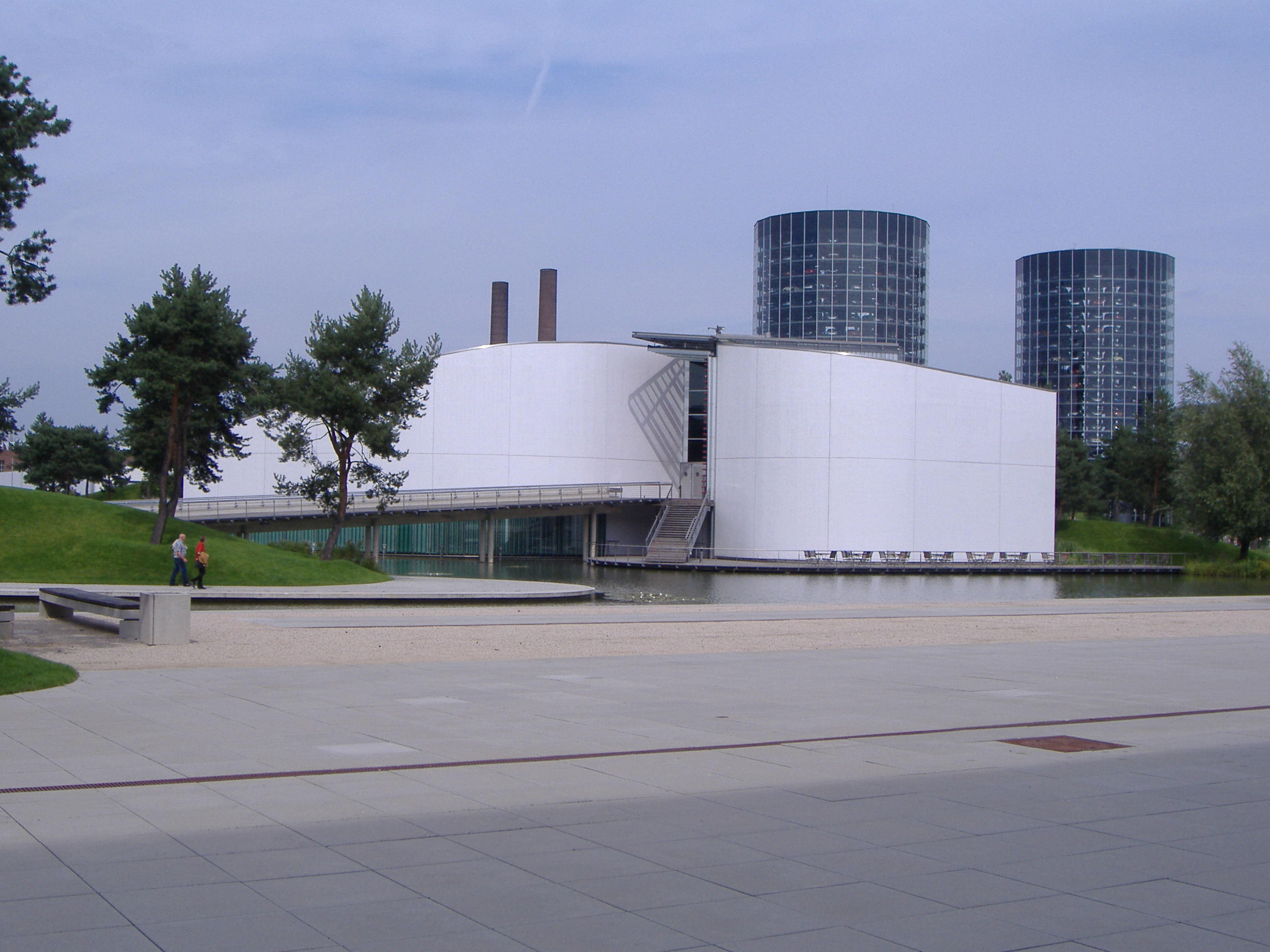
The SEAT pavilion with the entrance bridge. The exit bridge is on the other side.

The SEAT pavilion is surrounded by water and plants and is one of the largest pavilions. A metal archway is located at the entrance to the bridge which leads to the entrance of the building. The roof of the entrance is glass and the wall to the right is composed solely of red wing mirrors. There is a display of the fourth generation of the SEAT Ibiza in a glass case. The platform it sits on rotates. The next room then comprises all current SEAT models on display. A staircase leads up to a mezzanine level with numerous computer screens and iPads with playable racing games. This finally leads to an exit which comprises a wooden based bridge on metal tubes. This bridge is interactive; the tubes contain speakers which play back the Seat 'castanet' SFX with each footstep across the bridge.

== See also ==
- August Horch Museum Zwickau
- AutoMuseum Volkswagen
- List of automobile museums
- Museum mobile
