= The Invention of Curried Sausage =

1995 novella by German author Uwe Timm

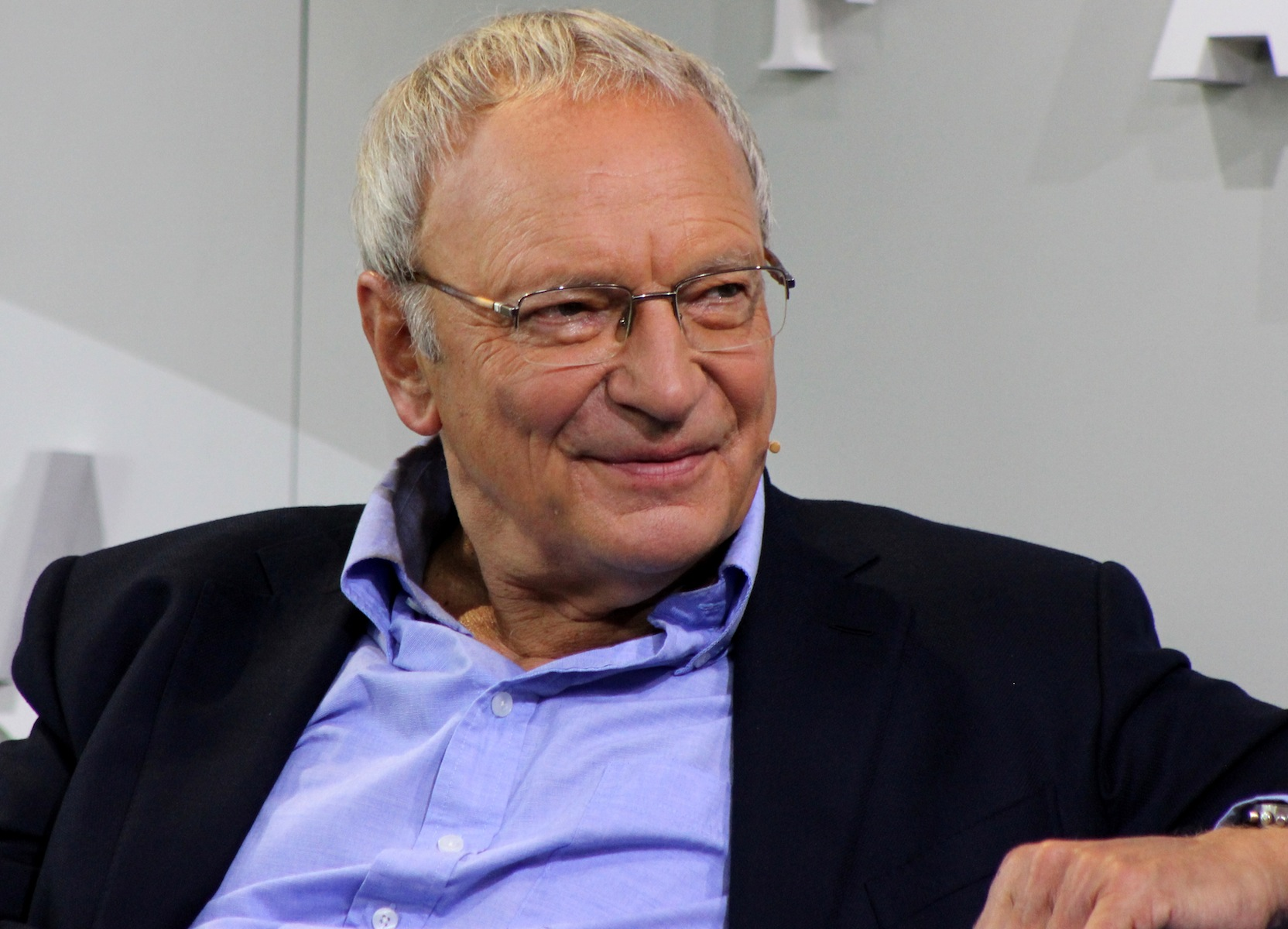
- The Invention of Curried Sausage author Uwe Timm in 2013
- Author: Uwe Timm
- Translator: Leila Vennewitz
- Language: English (translated from German by Leila Vennewitz)
- Published: 1995 (Kiepenheuer & Witsch) (German,1993)
- ISBN: 978-0-8112-1368-4

The Invention of Curried Sausage is a novella by German author Uwe Timm detailing the fictionalized invention of currywurst, a popular dish of sausage in curry ketchup in Germany, as well as describing life in Hamburg in the last days of the Second World War. The story follows an unnamed journalist seeking to track down the recipe of the currywurst he had when he was a child. The journalist believes that this particular currywurst recipe was the original recipe and that its creator, Lena Brücker, was the inventor of currywurst . His search leads him to the nursing home where Lena Brücker now lived. Lena's agreement to tell the journalist the story of how she came to invent currywurst serves as the major plot throughout the novel.

Originally published in German in 1993 as Die Entdeckung der Currywurst, the book was translated into English by Leila Vennewitz in 1995. In 2008, the book was adapted to a film by the same name, directed by Ulla Wagner.

== Plot ==
=== Chapter 1 ===
The narrator believes that a woman whose food stand he went to as a child was the inventor of the German snack food curried sausage. He seeks out the woman, Lena Brücker, who is now an elderly woman living in a nursing home in Hamburg. The narrator asks Lena to tell him the story of how she invented curried sausage. She agrees and she begins to tell her story.

She begins her story on April 29, 1945, the day of Hitler’s marriage to Eva Braun. She introduces Petty Officer Bremer and describes that they met when he bumped into her outside of the cinema in Hamburg. He was due to be deployed to the front lines the next day. After an airstrike occurred, the two of them went to a public air raid shelter. After the all clear was given, the two return to Lena’s apartment. After a night of drinking and talking, Lena convinces Bremer to stay and become a deserter instead of likely being killed on the front lines.

=== Chapter 2 ===
In the beginning of the chapter Bremer is faced with a dilemma: he is too afraid to go to fight on the front lines but he is also afraid of being killed if it is found out he deserted the army. He decides to stay with Lena, a woman whom he just met and was now completely dependent on.

Lena then goes to work at a canteen in Hamburg. She describes to the narrator that an employee there, Holzinger, had been questioned by the Gestapo after allegedly making Nazi broadcasters sick while working in the kitchen at a Reich radio station. On her way home from work she heard about the status of the front in Hamburg but nothing about Bremer’s unit. It would turn out that his entire unit had been killed.

When Lena is home there is a knock at the door. She hides Bremer and opens the door for the block air warden, Lammers. Lammers suspected that he heard voices and that Lena was harboring a fugitive in her home. Lammers looks around and finds Bremer’s lighter but Lena claims it was a gift from a friend. He eventually leaves, though unconvinced that there is nobody there. After Lammers left, they discussed that Bremer must be quieter when she is at work.

=== Chapter 3 ===
The majority of this chapter follows Bremer becoming accustomed to his new way of life in hiding. He discovers the belongings of Lena’s husband, whom she has not seen in years. Lena discovers a picture of Bremer’s wife and child in his wallet. When Lena asks if Bremer is married he lies to her and says that he is not.

The two spend the night together in Lena’s bed. The creaking of the mattress causes the downstairs neighbor, Mrs. Eckleben, to bang loudly against the ceiling. This creaking furthers the suspicions of the tenants of the building that there is someone besides Lena in the apartment.

=== Chapter 4 ===
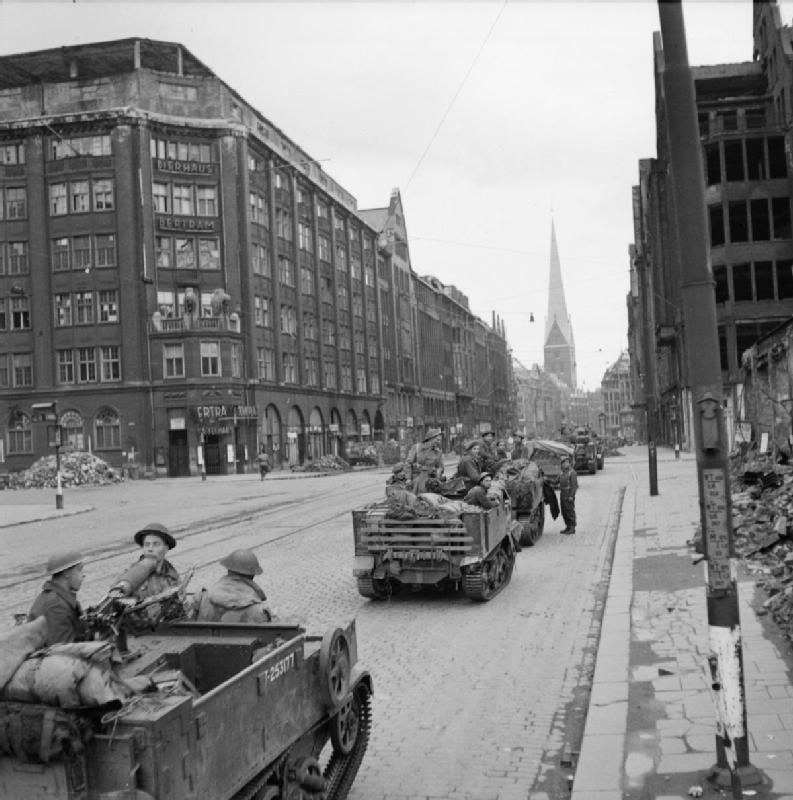
After the war was over, Hamburg was occupied by British soldiers as mentioned in the book.

The chapter begins with Lena learning that Hitler is dead and that for all intents and purposes, the war is over in Germany. She is then faced with the dilemma of whether or not to tell Bremer the news because if she tells him that the war is over, then he will leave to return to his family and she would be alone again.

When she gets home she tells him that Hitler is dead but does not mention the war being over. He begins asking questions about the future of the war and by answering them, Lena begins to grow a lie that the war is not over.

A few days later when Lena is returning from work she notices a large crowd outside of her building. She assumes that Bremer is being arrested but upon getting closer she notices a body hanging in the building. The air raid warden Lammers had committed suicide rather than face the disgrace of losing the power the Nazi regime had given him.

== Characters ==
Lena Brucker: An image-conscious, middle aged German woman who lives in Hamburg, Germany during the closing stages of World War II. Lena worked at a food-rationing office in Hamburg. She is married to a man named Willi and has children. Lena provides a haven for Werner Bremer in her apartment, keeping him there until after the war concludes. Despite being married, she falls in love with Bremer. She misleads Bremer about the events of the war to keep him in the apartment for a longer period. She is also forced to deflect suspicious questions from Lammers and Mrs. Eckleben to keep Werner safe from capture. However, her plan fails as she gets in a fight with Bremer and eventually discloses the conclusion of the war, resulting in his departure. In the novel, it is Lena Brucker that invents Currywurst in post war Hamburg. Lena stumbles upon the recipe by mistake, bartering for different items and mixing various ingredients until she obtains the perfect recipe. Some years later, an older Lena Brucker tells the story of the Curried Sausage to the narrator of the novel.

Hermann Bremer: A young German naval staff officer that deserts the military rather than serve on the front lines. Bremer stands out because of the Equestrian badge that is pinned on his uniform. He encounters Lena at the cinema in Hamburg and sleeps with her. Bremer chooses to stay with Lena in her apartment rather than fight on the front lines. He takes up refuge in Brucker’s apartment and quickly falls in love with her. Like Lena, it is revealed that Bremer has a family, a fact he initially chooses not to reveal to Lena. Bremer is kept in the dark concerning the events of the war by Lena Brucker. Bremer is deceived by Lena who wants him to remain in the apartment. Bremer continuously asks Lena for a newspaper, but she tells him that the war has not officially concluded, meaning that he could still be executed for desertion. Bremer eventually loses his ability to taste food. Lena eventually tells Bremer about the Holocaust and the end of the war. As a result, Bremer chooses to leave the apartment. Sometime later, Bremer encounters Lena at her food stand selling Currywurst.

Holzinger: He is one of Lena's few friends, as well as the chef where she works. Holzinger is secretly an enemy of the Nazi regime. Whenever the Nazis achieve a military victory, Holzinger purposefully serves bad food which makes the Nazi officers at the radio station sick.

Lammers: The block and air raid warden who is suspicious of Lena. Lammers believes that Lena is harboring a fugitive and personally interrogates her. Additionally, Lammers searches Lena’s apartment for the fugitive when she is away, forcing Bremer to hastily hide in a storeroom. Lammers kills himself following the fall of the Nazis.

Minor Characters: Willi “Gary Cooper” (Lena’s husband) who returns after the war from service on the Eastern Front, the narrator of the story who interviews an elderly Lena concerning the invention of Currywurst, and a young man named Hugo who helps at Lena’s nursing home; Henning Wehrs, a cheerful Communist sympathizer who was turned over to the Nazis and later dies suspiciously. Mrs. Eckleben is Lena’s downstairs neighbor who is also suspicious of her. She claims that she hears Lena and another person in the apartment, threatening to report Lena. It is later revealed that Mrs. Eckleben turned Wehrs over to the Nazis. Mrs. Claussen is another neighbor of Lena’s.

== Critical reception ==
The critical reaction to the novel has generally been positive. Multiple reviewers, writing for prominent newspapers and websites, have praised Uwe Timm for his narrative abilities. Writing for The New York Times, Francine Prose gave the novel a mixed-to-positive review. Prose states that the book is not expansive enough in its narrative. However, Prose praises Timm for showing the connection between important historical lessons and everyday items such as food. Kirkus Reviews gave the novel a positive review saying, “A small, perfect feast: full of life, heart, spirit, and laughter,”. Publishers Weekly was impressed by Timm’s controlled and clear style of writing. Additionally, they state that, “Timm probes the moral ambiguity pervading daily life at a time when ordinary people struggled to survive amid chaos and ruin,”. Kathleen Hughes, writing for Booklist states, “A best-seller in Germany, this highly entertaining, powerful work will dazzle American readers,”. In their review of the novel, the Los Angeles Times commends Timm for his characterization of Lena Brucker as a splendid and spirited woman. The Los Angeles Times concludes its review by stating, “Timm's curried sausage is a trifle sweeter than Lena's-his book was a great success in Germany-but it bites and invigorates nonetheless,”. In general, The Invention of Curried Sausage has been praised by book reviewers, websites, and newspapers since its German language release in 1993.

== Actual Invention ==
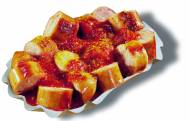
Currywurst

While The Invention of Curried Sausage is a work of fiction, and the invention detailed in the book is untrue, the German delicacy, currywurst, has a rich history of its own. Currywurst is believed to have been invented by Herta Heuwer in West Berlin in 1949. Historians believe that she experimented with pepper and paprika until she formulated her well known curry sauce.

Currywurst has become so popular in Germany that there is an entire museum dedicated to it in Berlin.
