= Currywurst =

Fast food dish of German origin

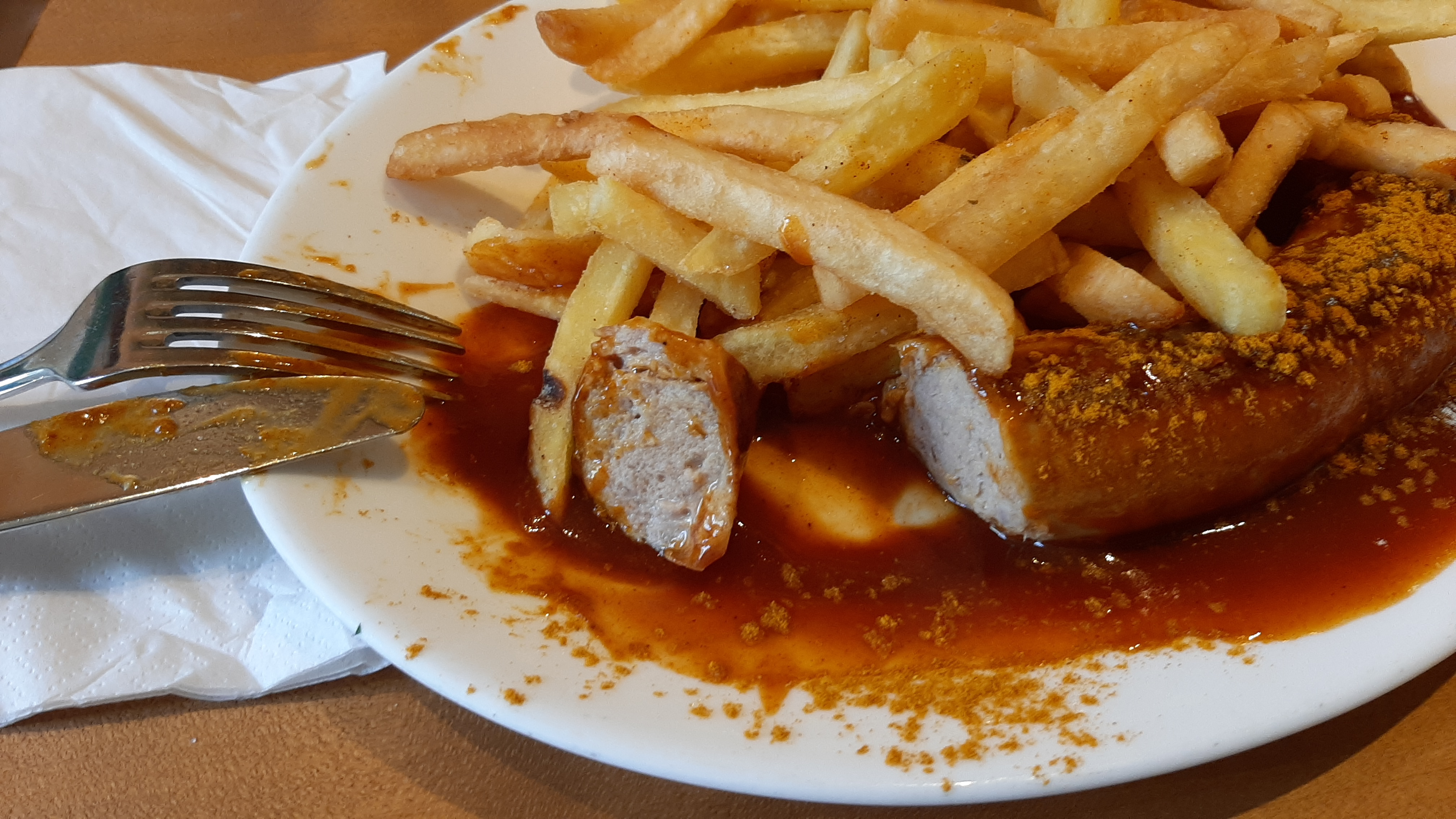
- Currywurst lightly topped with curry powder, curry sauce, and served with French fries
- Type: Bratwurst
- Place of origin: Germany
- Region or state: Berlin
- Associated cuisine: German cuisine
- Created by: Herta Heuwer
- Invented: c. 1949
- Main ingredients: Pork sausage, curry ketchup
- Variations: Berliner currywurst, Volkswagen currywurst, currywurst with beef sausage

Currywurst (German: [ˈkœʁiˌvʊɐ̯st]) is a fast food dish of German origin consisting of sausage (usually pork) with curry ketchup. It was invented in 1949 by Herta Heuwer, who began selling it at a food stand in West Berlin. The Deutsches Currywurst Museum estimated that 800 million currywursts are eaten every year in Germany, with 70 million in Berlin alone.

== History ==
The invention of currywurst is attributed to Herta Heuwer in Berlin in 1949, after she obtained ketchup, or possibly Worcestershire sauce, and curry powder from British soldiers in Germany. She mixed these ingredients with other spices and poured them over grilled pork sausage. Heuwer started selling them at a stand in Charlottenburg, where it became popular with construction workers rebuilding the devastated city.

Heuwer patented her sauce under the name Chillup in 1951. At its height the stand was selling 10,000 servings per week. She later opened a small restaurant which operated until 1974.

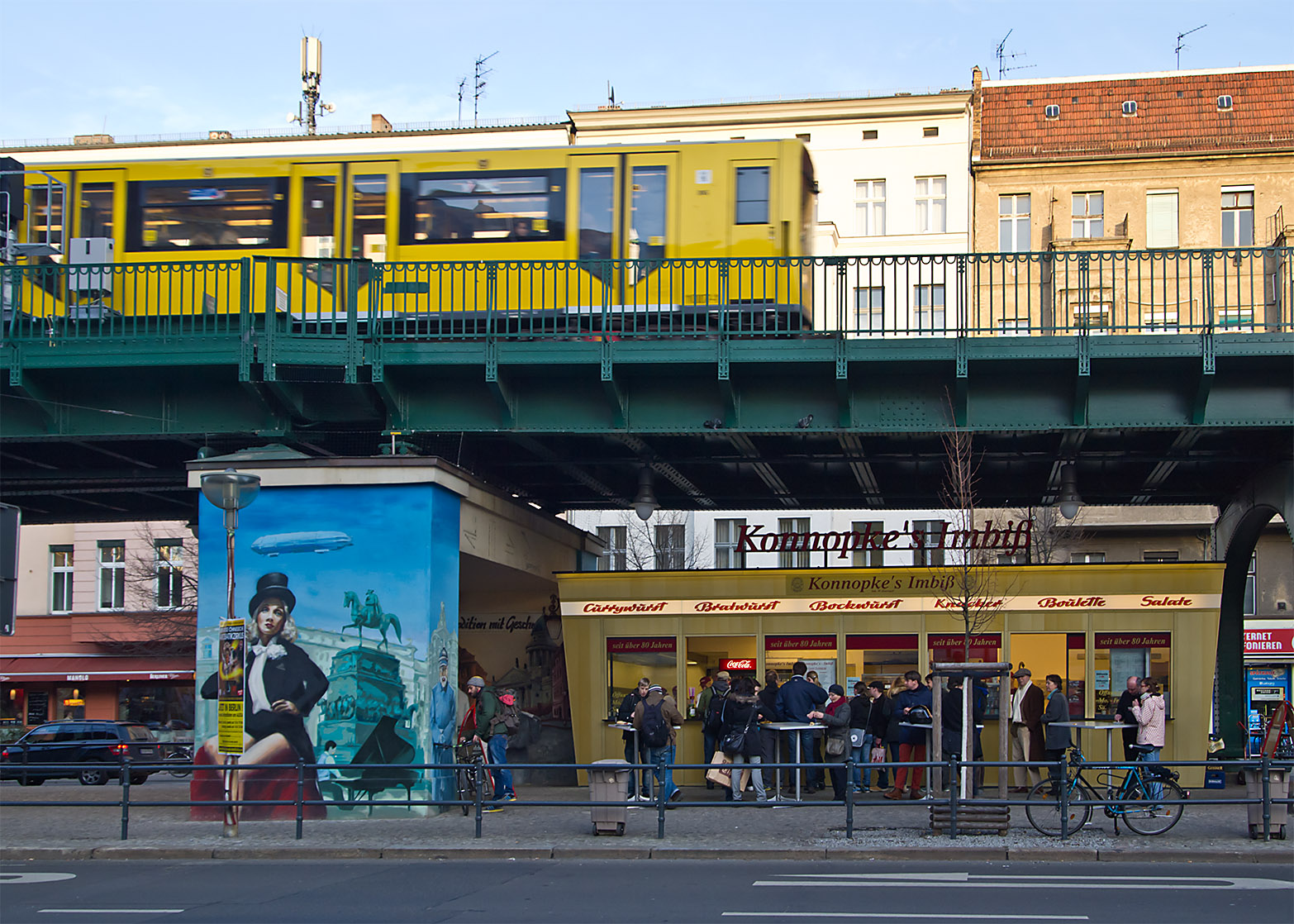
Konnopke's Imbiss (Fast Food Stand) in Berlin. It was the first Imbiss to sell currywurst in East-Berlin in 1960.

Today, currywurst is often sold as a take-away food, Schnellimbisse (snack stands), at diners or "greasy spoons," on children's menus in restaurants, or as a street food and usually served with chips or bread rolls (Brötchen). It is popular all over Germany but especially in the metropolitan areas of Berlin, Hamburg and the Ruhr Area. Considerable variation, both in the type of sausage used and the ingredients of the sauce, occurs between these areas.

Common variations include the addition of paprika or chopped onions. Halal and kosher food stands often prepare currywurst with beef sausage. Often currywurst is sold in food booths, sometimes using a special machine to slice it into pieces, and served on a paper plate with a little wooden or plastic fork, mostly a currywurst fork. It is sold as a supermarket-shelf product to prepare at home.

The Deutsches Currywurst Museum estimated that 800 million currywursts are eaten every year in Germany, with 70 million in Berlin alone. The Volkswagen plant at Wolfsburg runs its own butchery, producing about 7 million Volkswagen currywursts per year, serving many directly to Volkswagen employees.

== In popular culture ==
Former Chancellor Gerhard Schröder is a noted fan of currywurst. In a 2021 controversy over Volkswagen's plans to take the dish off its canteens' menus, he called it the "power bar of the skilled factory worker". By tradition, every candidate for the mayor of Berlin is photographed at a currywurst stand.

The song "Currywurst" on Herbert Grönemeyer's 1982 album Total Egal (meaning: Totally Regardless) is a tribute to the snack.

The 1993 novel Die Entdeckung der Currywurst (English title: "The Invention of Curried Sausage", ISBN 978-0811212977) by Uwe Timm was made into a 1998 play and a 2008 film both of the same name. The plot is based on an alternative but unproven theory that currywurst was invented in Hamburg.

The Deutsches Currywurst Museum (German Currywurst Museum) opened in Berlin in August 2009, commemorating the 60th anniversary of its creation. Curator Martin Loewer said "No other national German dish inspires so much history and has so many well-known fans". The museum received approximately 350,000 visitors annually. It permanently closed in December 2018.

In 2019 Berlin State Mint issued a commemorative currywurst coin celebrating the 70 years since the savoury snack was first sold in Berlin by Herta Heuwer. The silver alloy coin features two currywursts pierced with a wooden chip fork and poured with the sauce (coloured by print), and Herta Heuwer in the background (caption: 70 Jahre Currywurst). The other side of the coin shows the Brandenburg Gate (caption: Münze Berlin, 2019).

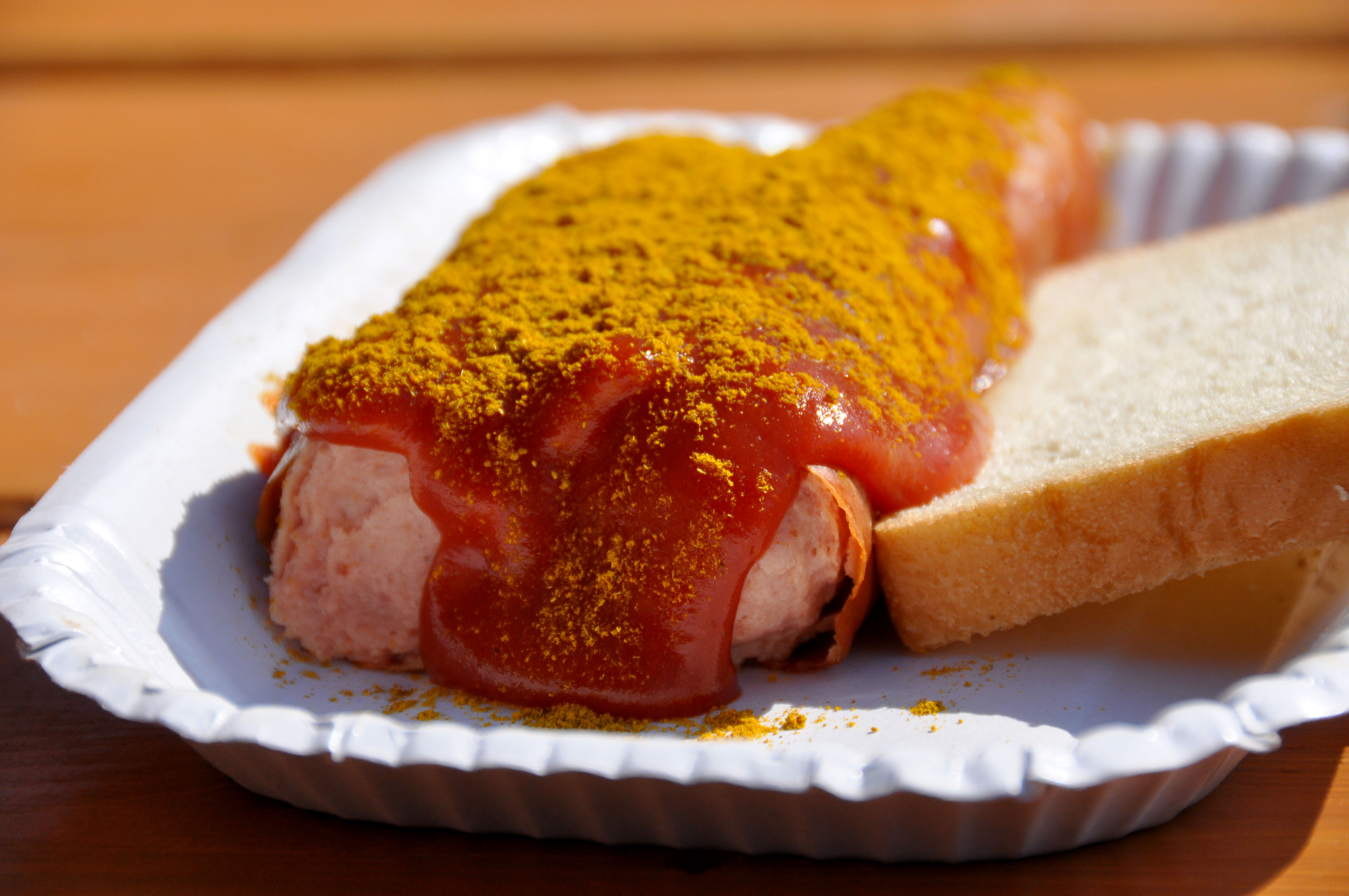
Served with bread

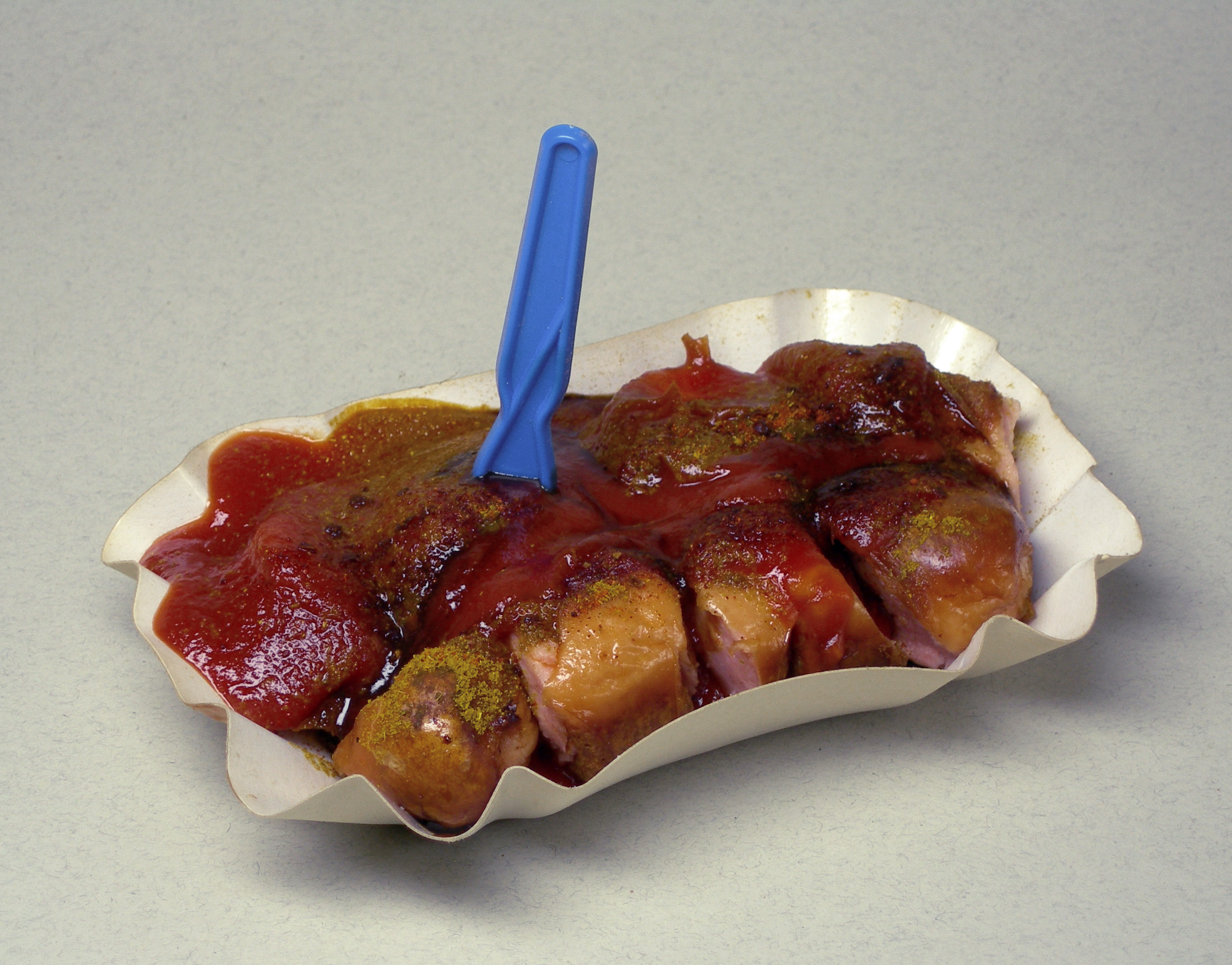
Currywurst - served sliced

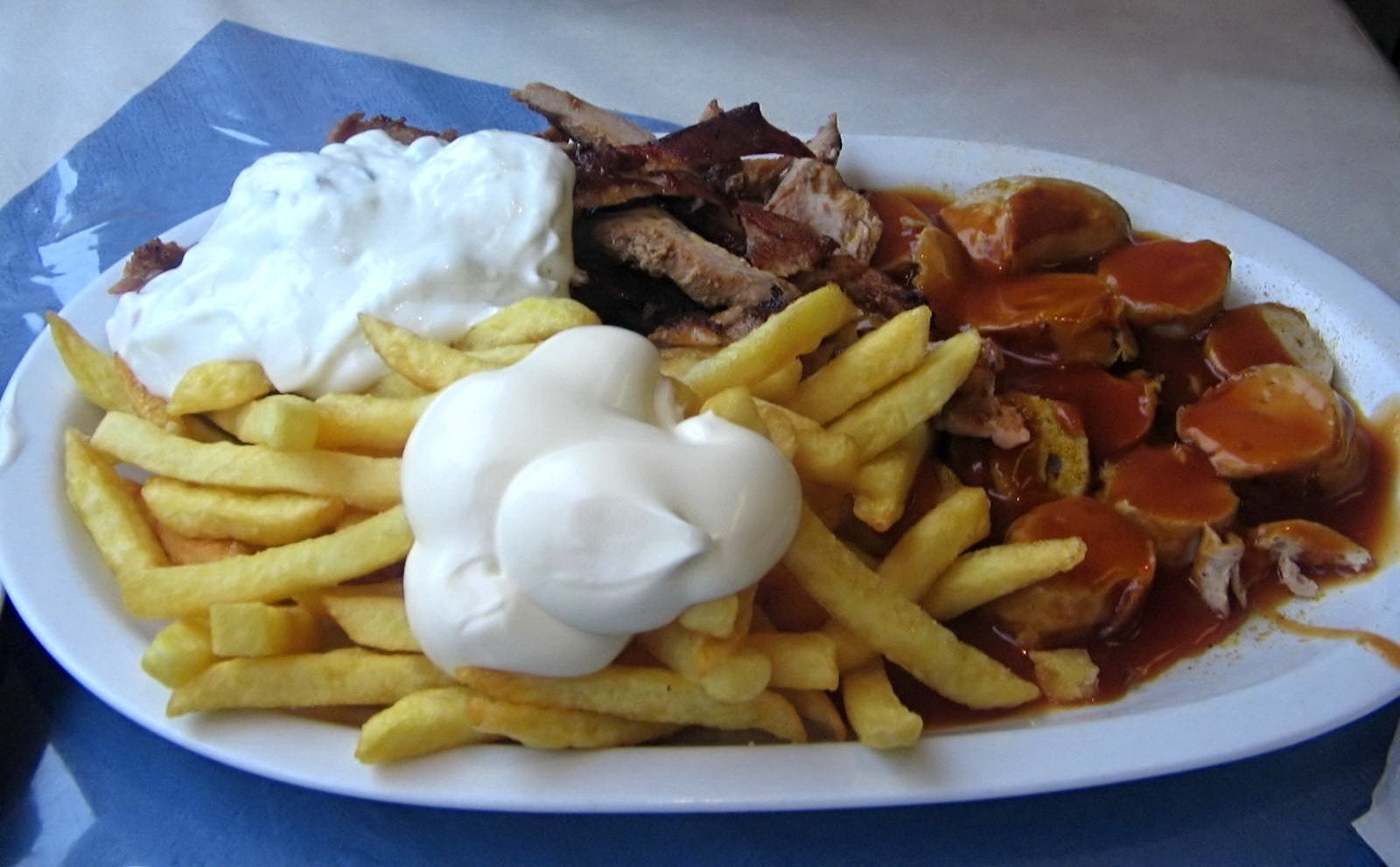
A "Taxi Teller" is a plate currywurst, fries with mayonnaise, gyros, and tzatziki.

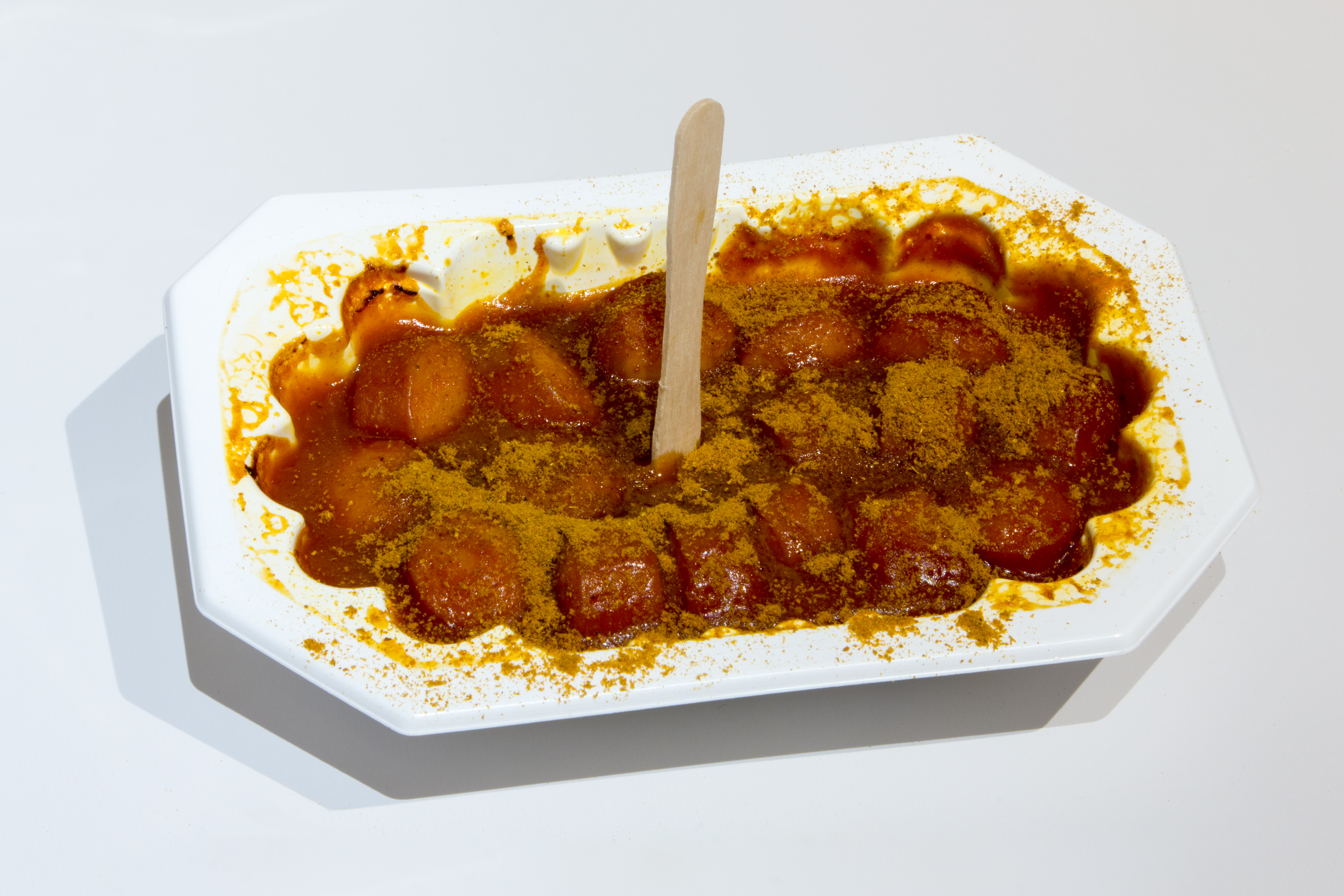
Currywurst as a supermarket-shelf product to prepare at home

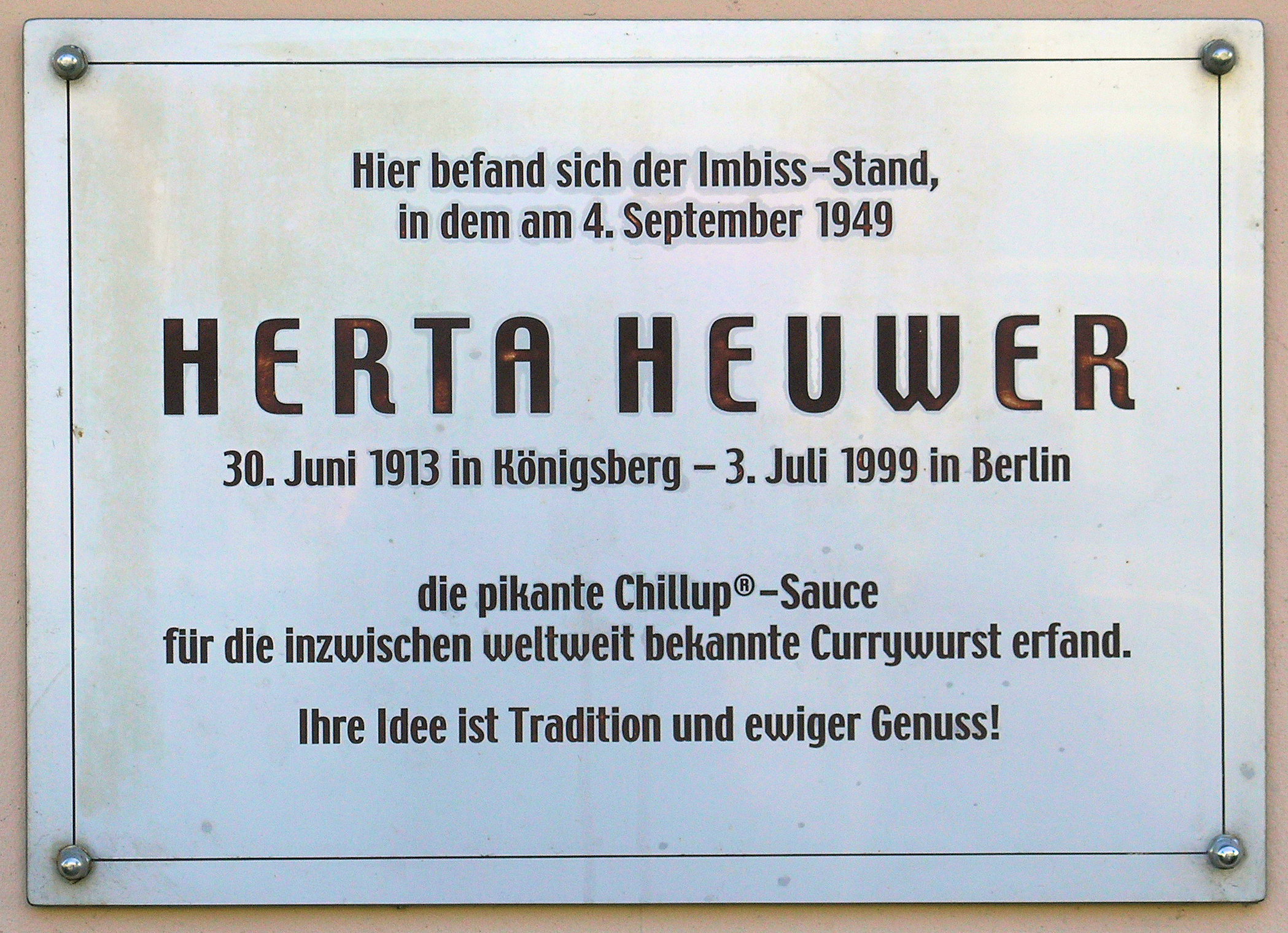
Plaque in Charlottenburg, Berlin, where Herta Heuwer is said to have invented the currywurst

== See also ==
- List of sausage dishes
- Makkaraperunat
- Salchipapa
- Sosis Bandari
