= Volkswagen currywurst =

Currywurst produced by Volkswagen

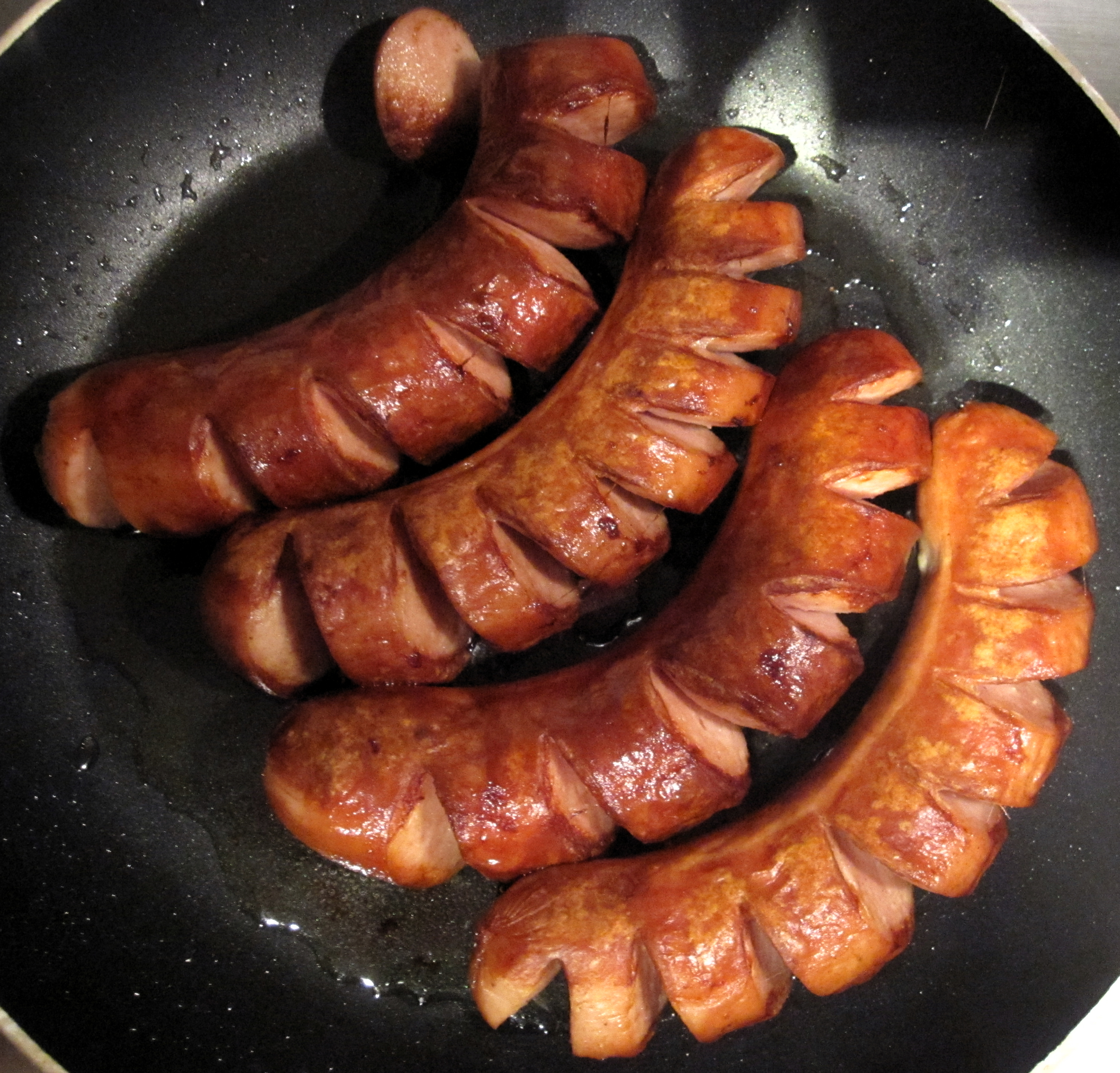
Small Volkswagen currywurst cooked in a frying pan

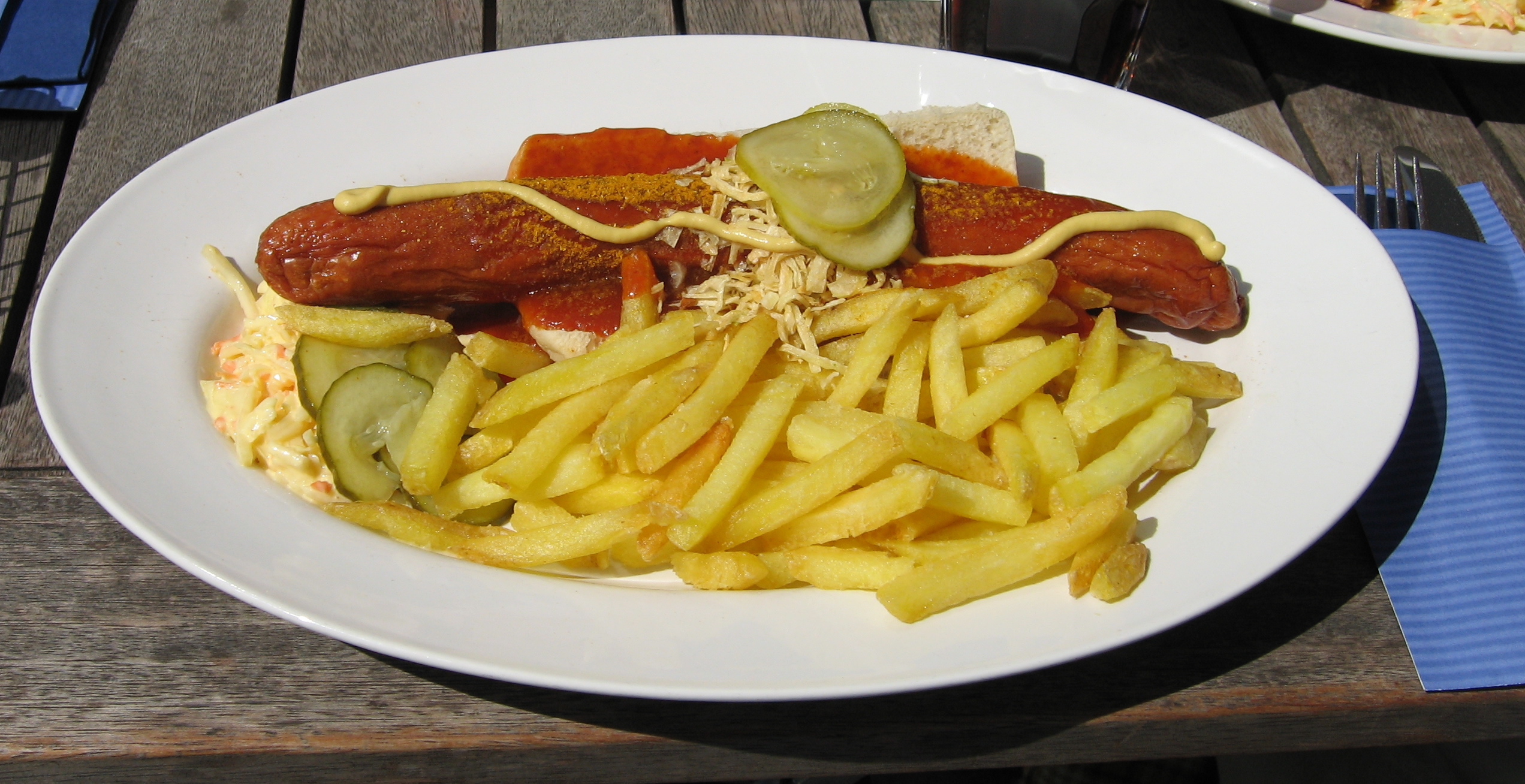
Large Volkswagen currywurst with chips, bread and accompaniments

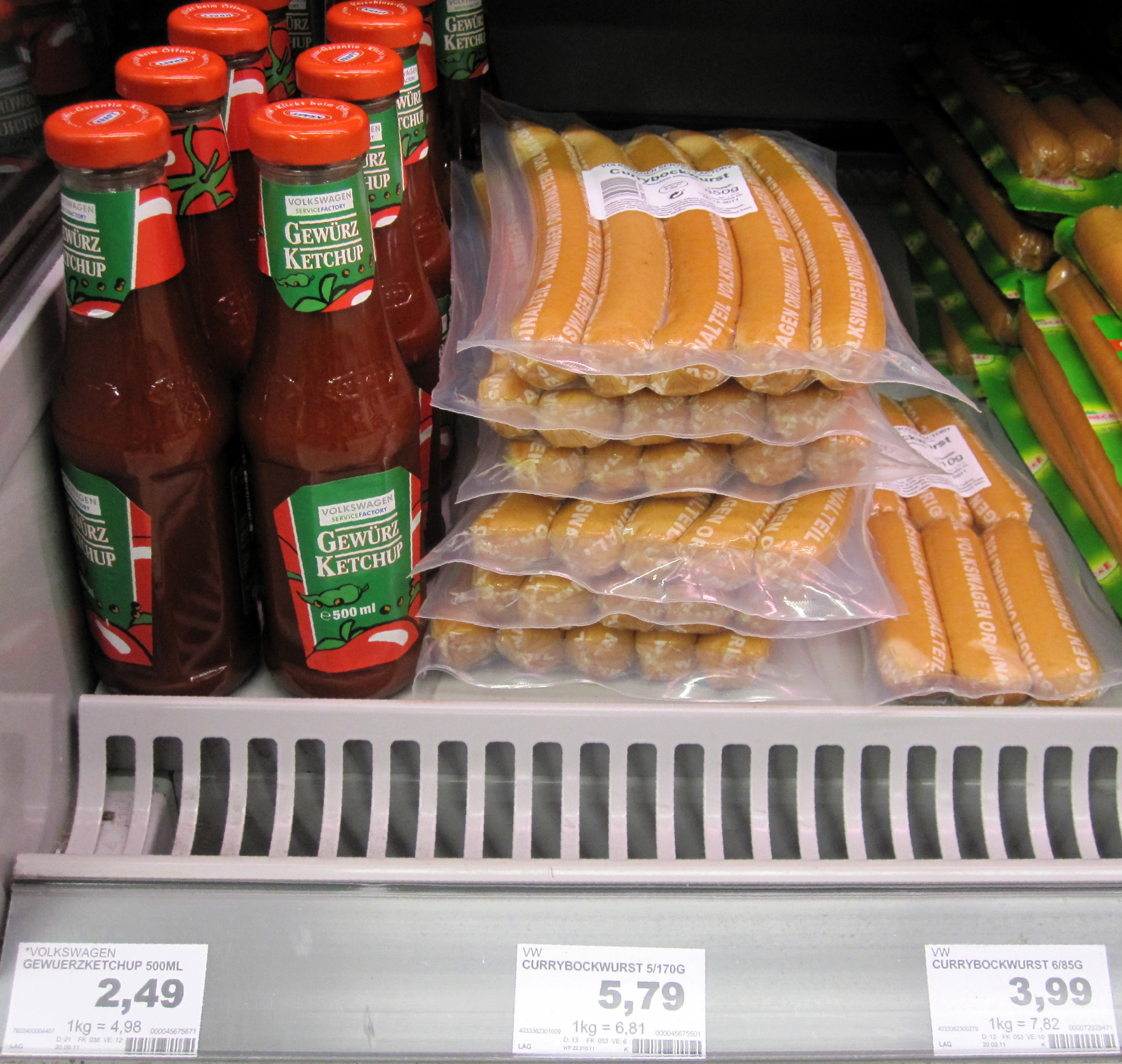
Small and large variants of the currywurst and bottles of ketchup at a supermarket in Braunschweig

Volkswagen currywurst (pronounced [ˈfɔlksˌvaːɡn̩ ˈkœʁiˌvʊʁst]) is a brand of currybockwurst (German pronunciation: [ˈkœʁiˌbɔkvʊʁst]) made by the German car manufacturer Volkswagen since 1973 at the Wolfsburg Volkswagen Plant. It is sold at restaurants in its six German factories, as well as in supermarkets and at football stadiums, and given to Volkswagen customers. The bockwurst is humorously branded as a Volkswagen Originalteil ('original Volkswagen part'); its part number is 199 398 500 A.

The product has been described as the most-produced of any of Volkswagen's parts, with some 7 million sausages made in 2019 and 8.33 million in 2023. In many recent years, the company has produced more sausages than cars. Volkswagen also makes a ketchup, Volkswagen Originalteil 199 398 500 B, to accompany the currywurst – slightly more viscous than traditional ketchup. A pack of sausages and a bottle of ketchup retail for approximately €9. The factory also makes a wheat-based vegan version.

== Description ==
The sausage is manufactured within the Wolfsburg Volkswagen Plant by a team of 30 people, in two sizes: 12.5 centimetres (4.9 in) at 85 grams (3.0 oz) and 25 centimetres (9.8 in) at 170 grams (6.0 oz).

Made from pork delivered to the factory three times a week, the sausage's pork cuts are trimmed to remove excess fat, giving a fat content of approximately 20%, significantly lower than the 35% typical for a bratwurst sausage. The pork is then ground and mixed with a secret recipe of spices before insertion into sausage skins – each branded with Volkswagen Originalteil.

The sausages are hung on racks and smoked over beechwood for 100 minutes at 176 °C (349 °F). After cooling the sausages are sealed into packs of five.

The factory makes around 20,000 sausages per day, totalling some 1,181 tonnes (2.6 million pounds) per year.

Volkswagen has said the currywurst contains no protein powder, monosodium glutamate nor phosphates, and has announced plans to ban all factory-farmed meat from its staff cafeterias by 2025.

The currywurst is sold in the 17 canteens and restaurants in the Wolfsburg factory, usually with ketchup and French fries. A currywurst soup is also sold. To celebrate the product's 45th anniversary, currywurst burgers and currywurst pizza were produced.

Volkswagen also sells utensils to go with the currywurst. One example is the plate, part number 33D 069 602.

== History ==
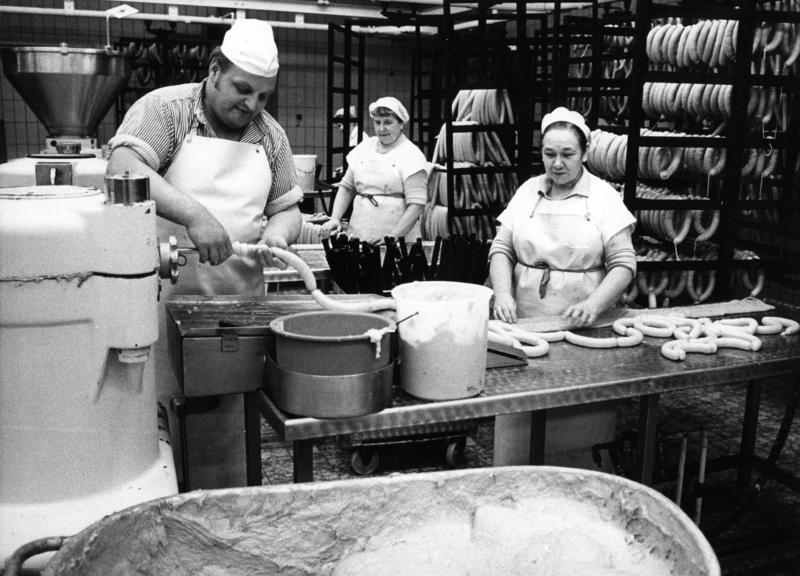
The Volkswagen butchery at the Wolfsburg plant in 1973

Volkswagen has produced food for its workers at the Wolfsburg plant since it opened in 1938 due to the remote location of the factory. It has produced the currywurst since 1973.

Initially, the plant received whole animals from a Volkswagen-owned farm that were butchered on site – this has since ceased and pre-butchered animals are sourced locally.

The meat was originally a blend of pork and beef; however, the beef was removed in the 1990s, owing to the United Kingdom BSE outbreak of that decade.

The currywurst has won prizes at German food fairs and has received gold awards from the German Agricultural Society.

The sausage features in the AutoMuseum Volkswagen, and at the Deutsches Currywurst Museum until it closed in 2018.

Around 40% of Volkswagen currywurst production is consumed within restaurants at its six German factories; the remainder is sold at external shops, supermarkets and football stadiums. A portion is also sent to Volkswagen dealerships across Europe which use the currywurst as a present for customers who purchase new cars.

Proceeds from external sales are used by Volkswagen to subsidise the price of food in its staff restaurants.

The product is sold in 12 countries; it is not available in the United States due to its rules on the import of uncooked meat.

In the past Volkswagen has sent a team of chefs to the United States to replicate the product with locally sourced ingredients. The company is also looking to export the product to Singapore.

Currywurst production increased during the latter half of the 2010s. In 2015, 7.2 million were produced, 14% more than had been manufactured in 2014. Production increased by 264% between 2009 and 2018 when 6.81 million were made, making the currywurst the most produced of any part in the Volkswagen range. Production reached 8.33 million in 2023.

For several years, Volkswagen produced more individual currywurst than individual cars.

Ketchup production has also increased, rising from 536,826 kilograms (1,183,499 lb) in 2014 to 608,208 kilograms (1,340,869 lb) in 2015.

The vegetarian currywurst was introduced in 2010. In August 2021, Volkswagen announced that it was removing the traditional pork-based product from one of its canteens in favour of the vegetarian version. This move drew fire from former German chancellor Gerhard Schröder. Schröder expressed his displeasure at this move in a social media post, stating "Currywurst with fries is one of the power bars of the skilled production worker [...] it should stay that way."

== See also ==
- List of sausages

== Sources ==
- Attwood, James (1 January 2019). "Volkswagen's Currywurst Factory: Motoring's Strangest Production Line". Autocar.
- Brehaut, Laura (16 May 2018). "Volkswagen's bestselling product is … a type of sausage!?!?". National Post.
- Clarke, John (2 June 2019). "Americans can't buy VW's Best Seller, and it's the Wurst". The Wall Street Journal.
- "A taste of VW's hottest product". Deutsche Welle. dpa. 19 February 2016.
- "Ex-German Chancellor bemoans currywurst loss at VW". Deutsche Welle. dpa. 11 August 2021.
- Dupuy, Matt (1 September 2021). "Volkswagen to stop making its best-selling product for Wolfsburg workers: VW-branded sausages". The Register.
- Hruby, Denise (30 September 2019). "Volkswagen's Best-Selling Product is a ... Sausage". OZY. Archived from the original on 21 October 2021.
- Kellerhoff, Peter (11 March 2024). "8,33: Volkswagens Verkaufsschlager ist kein Auto" [8.33: Volkswagen's bestseller isn't a car]. VDI Nachrichten (in German). VDI Verlag.
- Krok, Andrew (14 May 2018). "Volkswagen's best-selling product is actually sausage". CNet Road Show.
- Posaner, Joshua; Gehrke, Laurenz (10 August 2021). "It's the Wurst! Schröder slams sausage-free Volkswagen menu". Politico.
- Rodionova, Zlata (19 February 2016). "Volkswagen sold more sausages than cars last year". The Independent.
- Rodríguez, José (26 August 2021). "Volkswagen To Stop Serving Sausage In Wolfsburg As It Tries To Leave Its Wurst Emissions Behind". Jalopnik.
- Schröder, Gerhard (2021). "Gerhard Schröder on LinkedIn: #vw #rettetdiecurrywurst". LinkedIn.
- Wieczner, Jen (19 February 2016). "Volkswagen's Sausages Sell Better Than Its Cars". Fortune.
