= In My Brother's Shadow =

2005 novel by Uwe Timm

In My Brother's Shadow: A Life and Death in the SS (Am Beispiel meines Bruders)
- Author: Uwe Timm
- Translator: Anthea Bell
- Published: 2003 (Kiepenheuer & Witsch) (de)
- Publisher: Farrar Straus & Giroux
- Publication date: 2005
- Publication place: Germany
- ISBN: 978-0374103743
- Preceded by: Morenga

In My Brother's Shadow: A Life and Death in the SS (German: Am Beispiel meines Bruders) is the title of a semi-autobiographical novel by Uwe Timm. The English translation by Anthea Bell was published in 2005.

The plot, based on Timm's own experience living through World War II, tells the story of the protagonist's brother, an SS corporal killed in Russia in 1943.
