= Wolfsburg Volkswagen Plant =

Manufacturing plant in Wolfsburg, Germany

- Wolfsburg Volkswagen
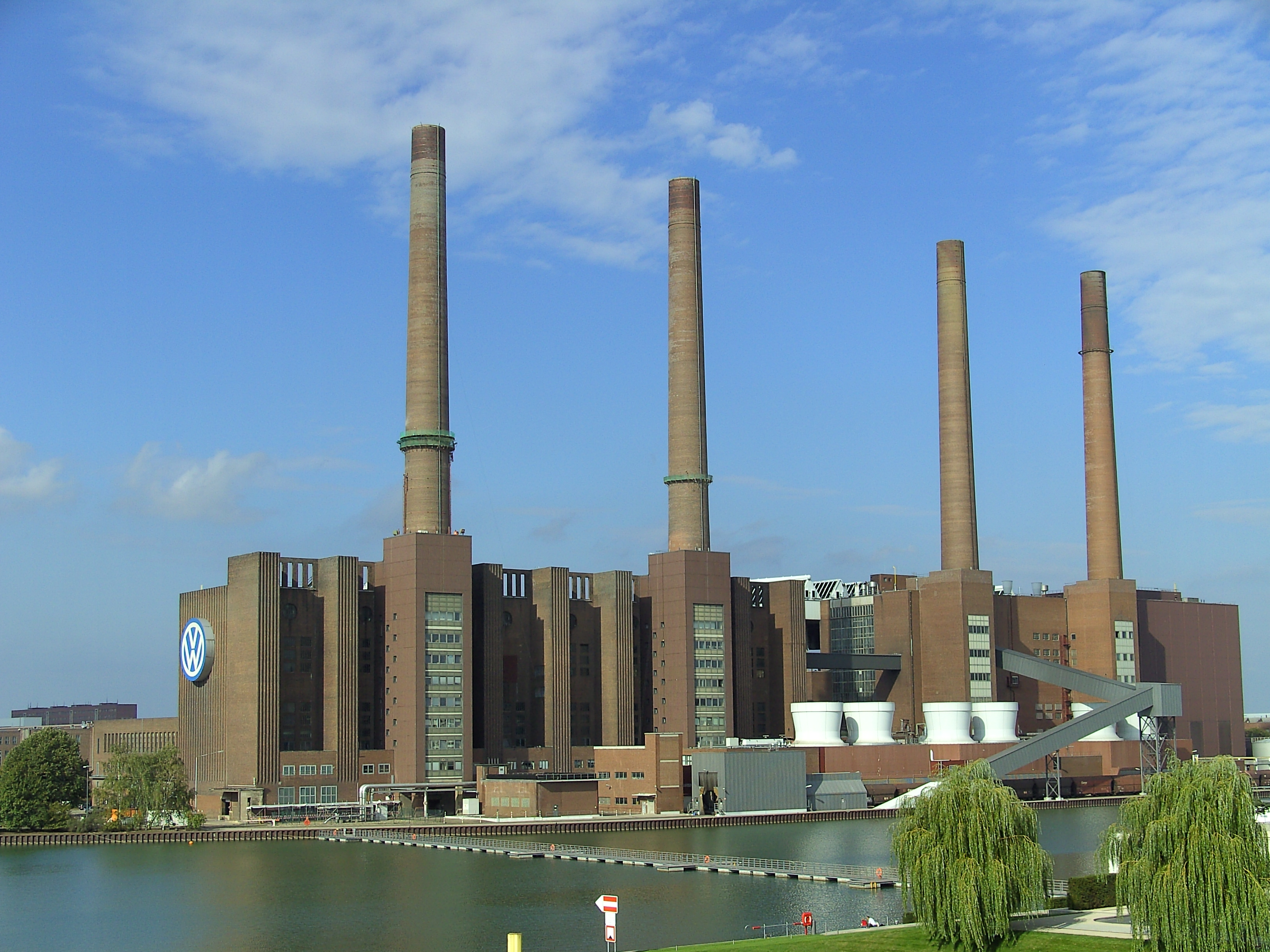
- Power plant of Wolfsburg Volkswagen at shore of Mittelland Canal

- Location within Germany
- Wolfsburg Volkswagen Plant is situated on the northern bank of the Mittelland Canal

General information
- Architectural style: Classic Industrial
- Location: Wolfsburg, 38440 Wolfsburg, Germany
- Coordinates: 52°26′20″N 10°45′56″E
- Opened: 26 May 1938; 88 years ago
- Owner: Volkswagen

Height
- Height: 92 m (302 ft) (height of highest chimney)

Technical details
- Material: Concrete and steel
- Floor area: 160 ha (400 acres)
- Grounds: 650 ha (1,600 acres)

The Wolfsburg Volkswagen Plant is the worldwide headquarters of the Volkswagen Group, and the flagship manufacturing plant of German automotive manufacturer Volkswagen. Situated in Wolfsburg in the German state of Lower Saxony, it is one of the largest manufacturing plants in the world, with an area of just under 6.5 million m^{2} (70 million ft^{2}) and a building area of 1.6 million m^{2} (17 million ft^{2}). In 2015, the plant produced 815,000 cars. Volkswagen's currywurst is also produced at this facility.

In mid-2023, around 61,880 people were employed at the plant. It was the largest in the world (over thrice the size of Monaco) until overtaken by the Tesla Gigafactory 5 in Texas in 2022, which has a larger grounds area of 850 hectares (2,100 acres) but a smaller factory floor area of 93 hectares (230 acres).

== History ==
=== History ===
The plant became the production site for the automobile demanded by Adolf Hitler for broad sections of the population. The basis for this "people's car", the "Volkswagen" or simply VW, was the contract concluded on 22 June 1934 between the Reich Association of the Automotive Industry and Ferdinand Porsche's Stuttgart design office. The Nazi organization "Community of Strength Through Joy" (KdF), part of the German Labour Front (DAF), took on the task of finding a suitable location for the production facility. The German automobile industry, which at the time comprised mainly luxury vehicle manufacturers such as Mercedes-Benz, Horch and Audi, had no interest in producing the Volkswagen, because it considered the price demanded by Hitler of 990 ℛ︁ℳ︁, equivalent to €4,688 in 2021, to be unrealistic. DAF was then commissioned to build the largest automobile factory in Europe. Under the supervision of DAF director Robert Ley, the Society for the Preparation of German Volkswagens mbH (Gesellschaft zur Vorbereitung des Deutschen Volkswagens mbH, abbreviated to Gezuvor) was founded on 28 May 1937, with its headquarters in Berlin. Their first and only product was to be the KdF-Wagen (lit. 'KdF-vehicle'). For financing – Bodo Lafferentz, the designated managing director of Volkswagen GmbH, estimated the need for the central systems to be at least 200 million ℛ︁ℳ︁ – the Arbeitsbank provided a loan of 50 million ℛ︁ℳ︁ in 1937, and the DAF's own insurance companies provided a loan of over 30 million ℛ︁ℳ︁ in 1939. The third major source of money was created with a law on the granting of compensation for the inclusion or transfer of assets, which came into force on 9 December 1937. This legalized the theft of union assets by the DAF in 1933 and the DAF was also able to sell properties belonging to the former unions, the total value of which was around 100 million ℛ︁ℳ︁. Other sources of money were the KdF-Sparer (lit. 'KdF-saver') and, from 1942, the Aviation Ministry with 48 million ℛ︁ℳ︁.

Porsche, the general manager of the newly founded VW GmbH, had explored modern production methods on study trips to the US, especially assembly line production, with which Henry Ford had revolutionized profitable mass production.

=== Location ===
In 1938, after a six-month search, Gezuvor found the future factory location. The location of the factory was the newly founded "City of the KdF-Wagen near Fallersleben" (renamed Wolfsburg in 1945). This city, which was planned on the drawing board, was created together with the plant from the end of the 1930s. The location on the Mittelland Canal in the glacial valley of the Aller was found more or less by chance as a result of a trip by Lafferentz to the rural and sparsely populated area near the municipality of Fallersleben and Wolfsburg Castle with the Schulenbergische Gutshof estate there. It was located almost in the geographical centre of the nation and offered the following convenient transport connections:

- The Mittelland Canal
- Reichsautobahn from Berlin to Hanover (today Federal Highway 2)
- Main railway line Berlin-Ruhr area (Berlin-Lehrter Railway)
- Proximity to the industrial city Salzgitter and Braunschweig

But there were also military aspects in favour of the location. In the foreseeable event of war, the factory was far from the border and therefore apparently somewhat more protected from air raids.

The three teams of architects Emil Rudolf Mewes (Cologne), Fritz Schupp and Martin Kremmer (Essen-Berlin) and Karl Kohlbecker (Gaggenau) were jointly commissioned to build the factory facilities. They designed the approximately 1.3-kilometre-long (0.81 mi) factory front with a thermal power plant on the northern bank of the Mittelland Canal, and the new city was built on the southern side. Wolfsburg Castle is situated 280 metres (920 ft) east of Wolfsburg Volkswagen Plant, across the Aller.

The laying of the foundation stone for the plant on 26 May 1938 by Hitler was staged on a large scale, with the participation of around 70,000 spectators and participants from National Socialist organizations. The construction work, with the help of thousands of workers, had already been going on for a year. Even before the foundation stone for the factory was laid, hundreds of thousands had already signed a savings contract for the factory's alleged product.

In the fall of 1939, the production halls were in shell form. However, there was no planned production of the KdF car (150,000 per year) because there was a lack of special machine tools due to the economy's preparation for war. The steel required for production was largely to be supplied from the newly founded "City of Hermann Göring Works" (Salzgitter).

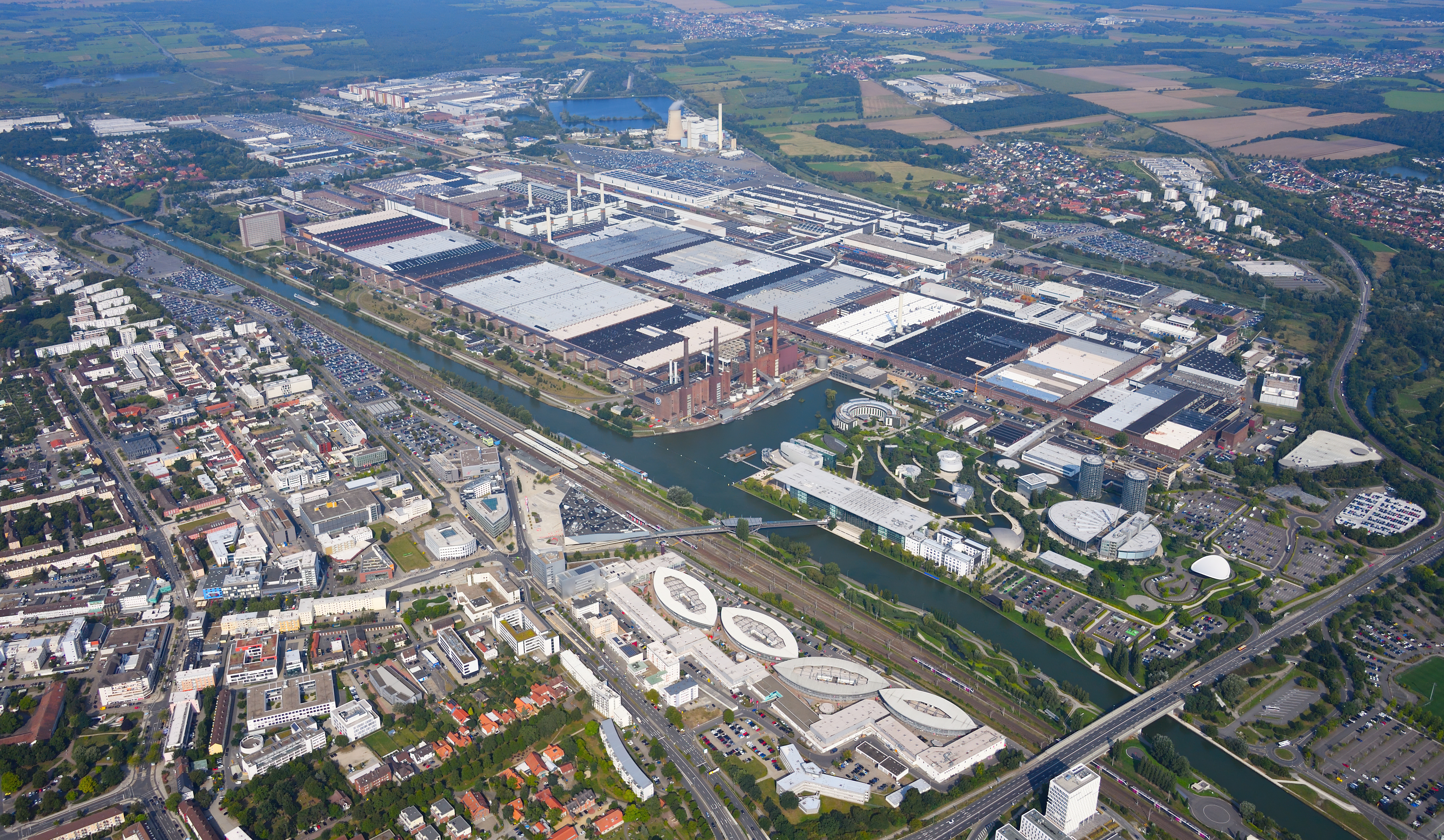
Aerial view of the plant from the southeast, seen here above the Mittelland Canal running from bottom right to top left

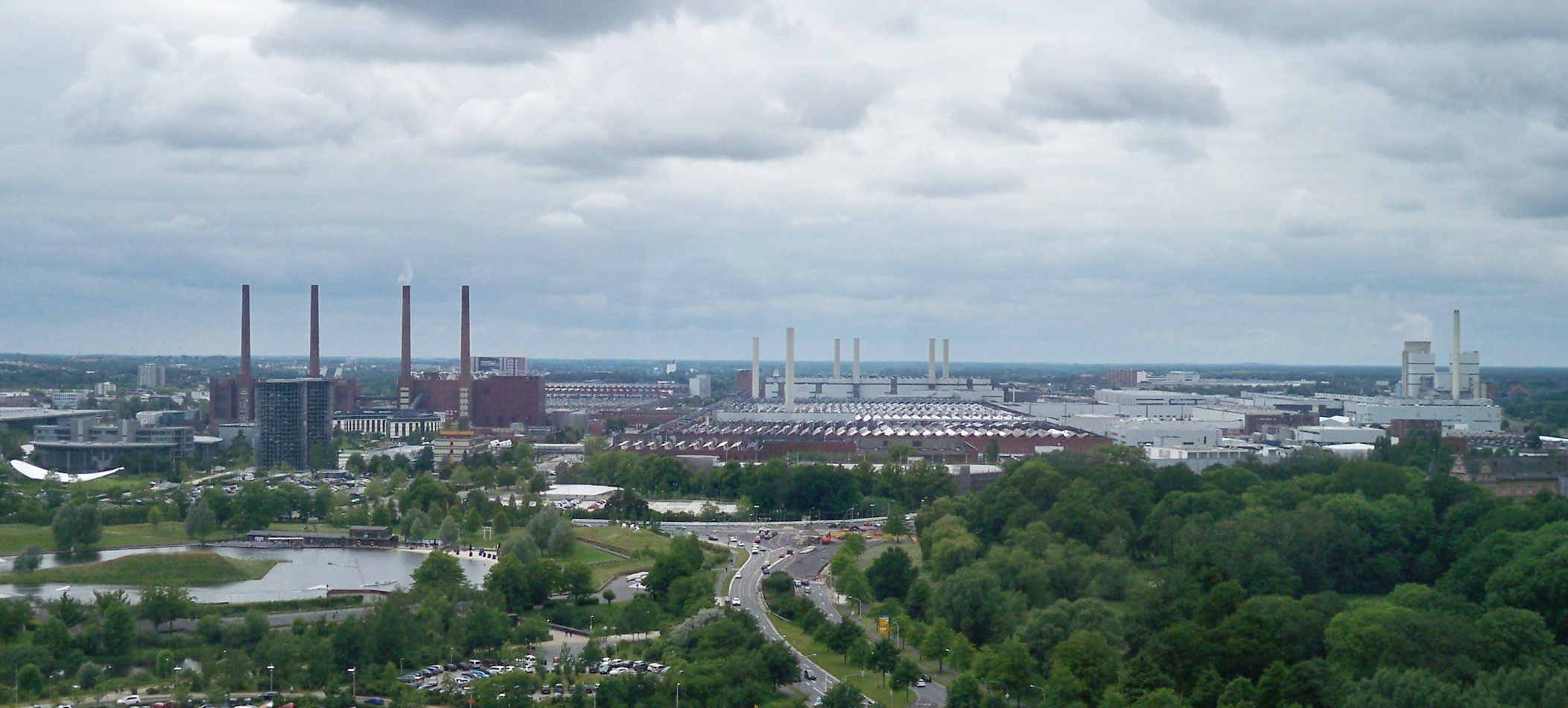
View from the east over the expanse of the plant. The four chimneys of the power plant are at the left.

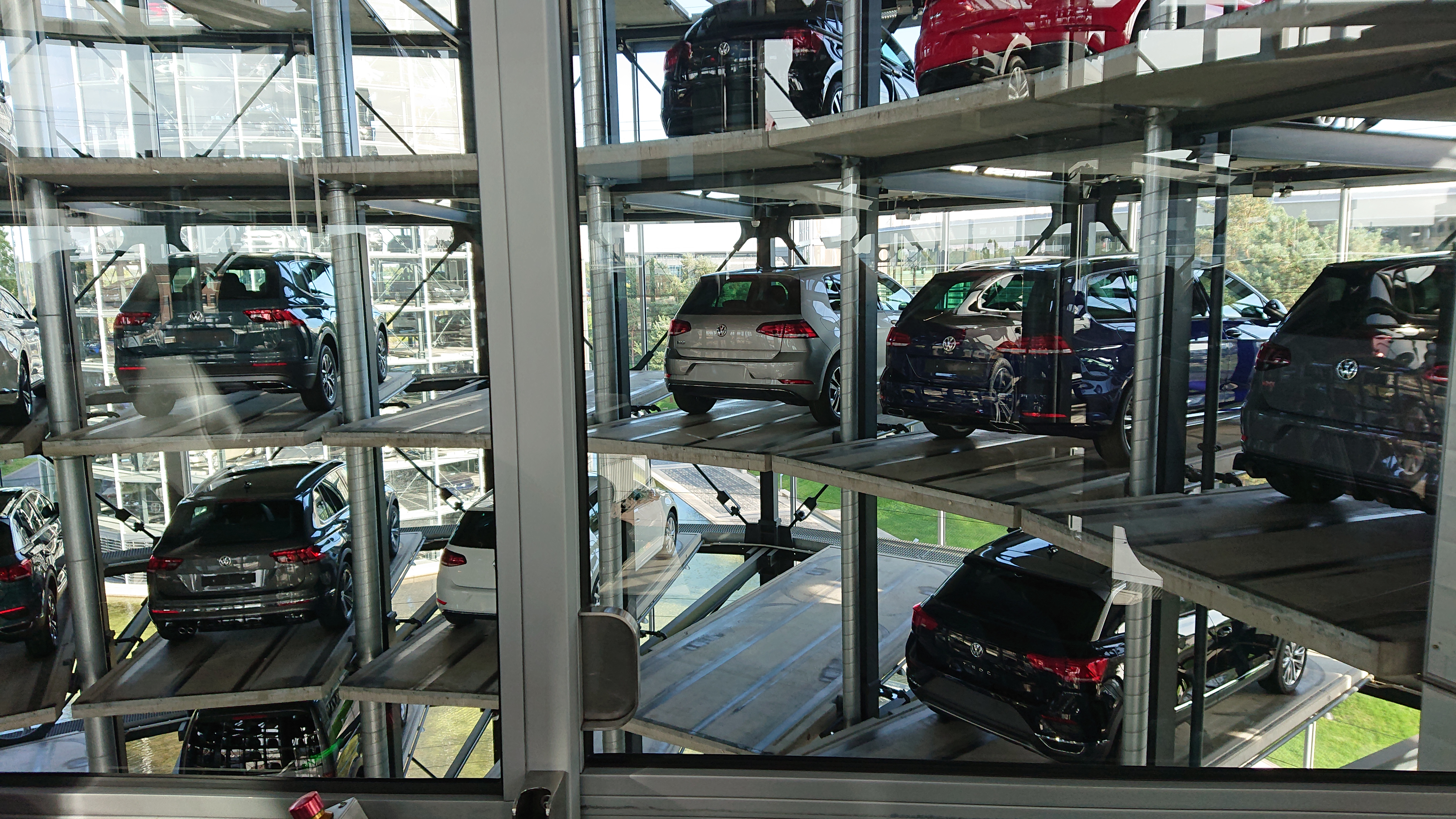
Inside one of the two 60-metre-tall (200 ft) towers in the Autostadt for collecting new cars directly at the factory with zero odometer reading

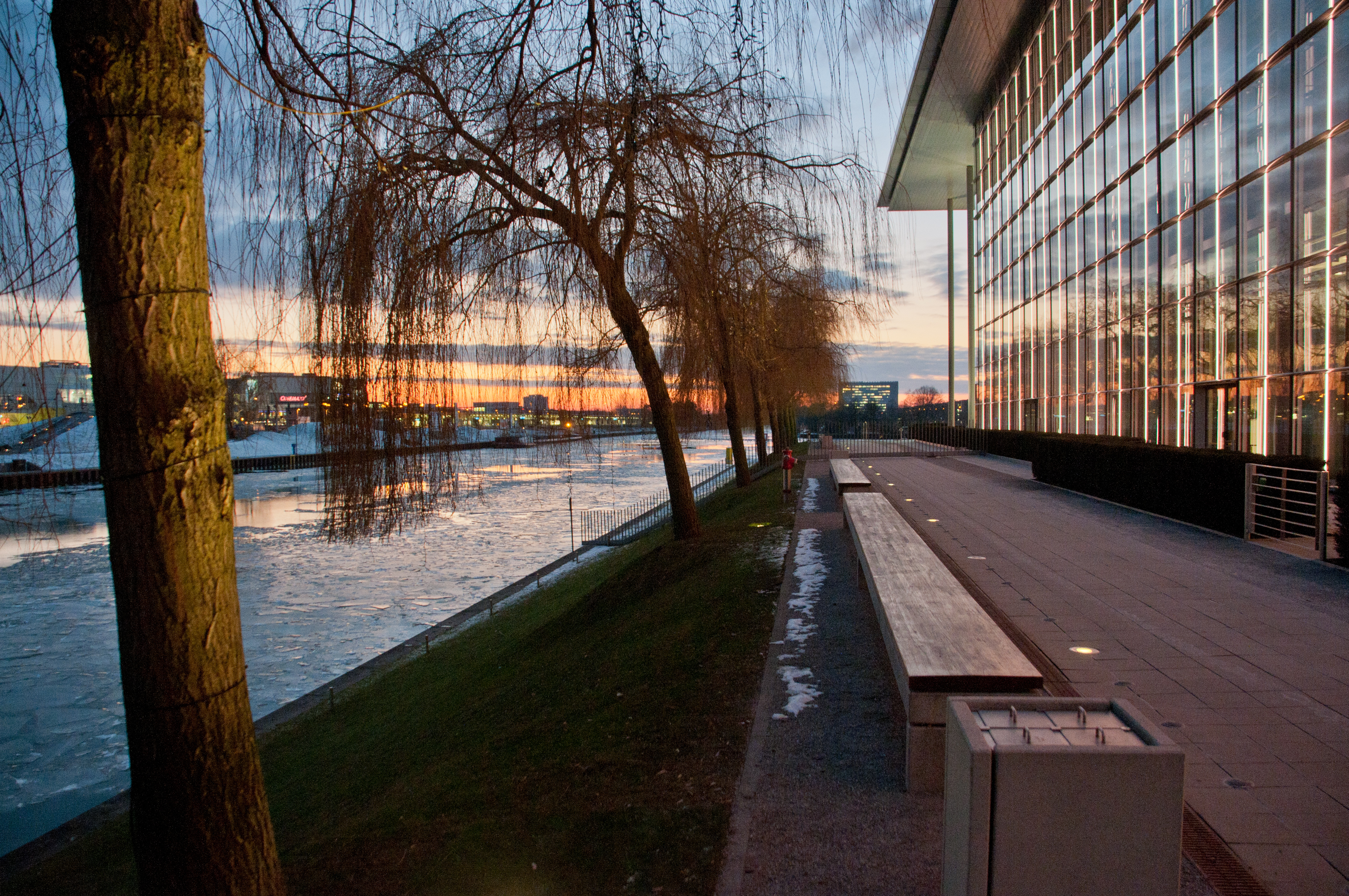
Looking west towards the Markenhochhaus

=== Start of production and World War II ===
Operations began at the end of the 1930s. The factory manager in those early years was the Austrian lawyer Anton Piëch, son-in-law of Porsche. With the outbreak of the Second World War, the production of civilian goods moved completely into the background and vehicles for the Wehrmacht and SS were produced in the factory: between August 1940 and April 1945, 50,788 Kübelwagen and an additional 14,276 Schwimmwagen (Type 166) were manufactured from autumn 1942 until after the last air raid at the beginning of August 1944, when Type 166 production could not be continued after important body presses were destroyed. The V-1 flying bomb was manufactured in a "secret department" in the basement of Hall I. Volkswagen built wings, rudders and cabins for the repair of Junkers Ju 88 aircraft of the Luftwaffe. From 1940 to 1945, around 20,000 people had to do forced labour in armaments production at the Volkswagen plant, including prisoners of war and concentration camp inmates. From 8 April to 11 October 1942, the Arbeitsdorf concentration camp was set up for construction work; the Laagberg subcamp existed from 1944 to 1945.

The "People's Car Factory near Fallersleben" was the target of a total of five Allied air raids, all in 1944: on 8 and 29 April, 20 and 29 June, and 5 August. During the last attack, eight presses were badly damaged and 50 machine tools and production machines were destroyed. After the last 50 Kübelwagen produced for the Wehrmacht had been completed on 10 April 1945, US Army units took over the factory the next day. At the end of the war, 20% of the factory buildings were destroyed, but 93% of the machine equipment was still in usable condition.

=== After 1945 ===
Under the British military government, represented by Major Ivan Hirst, the plant resumed operations in 1945. At the factory, mechanics from the British occupying army set up the Wolfsburg Motor Works, a repair facility for their war-damaged vehicles. In addition, production of the KdF car, henceforth called Volkswagen, began, while the other half of the 6,000-person workforce cleared away war debris. The British sent a first series Volkswagen to Great Britain for evaluation. Vehicle experts there found that the vehicle did not meet the technical requirements of an automobile and recommended that the factory be demolished. The military government nevertheless put the plant back into operation, partly because of the many displaced people arriving here. In 1945, almost 2,000 Volkswagens were built by hand, and in 1946 there were already around 10,000 vehicles. However, only the Allied authorities received the first 20,000 post-war VWs.

On 27 November 1945, the first works council was elected at the Wolfsburg plant. On 10 May 1947, a works agreement was concluded on the co-determination rights of the works council. It regulated co-determination, among other things. for hiring and firing, transfers, wage and salary issues and operational changes. This works agreement is one of over 40 works agreements in the Lower Saxony metal industry that were concluded after the 1946 Bode tank strike in Hanover. In 1948, IG Metall concluded the first collective agreements with Volkswagen, which developed into the Volkswagen in-house collective agreement within a few years. This collective agreement today applies to over 95% of the workforce at the Volkswagen plant in Wolfsburg, as they are members of IG Metall.

In January 1948, the military government handed over factory management to Heinrich Nordhoff. The federal government became trustee of the two VW plants in Wolfsburg and Braunschweig in 1949. After Henry Ford II was not willing to take over, the state of Lower Saxony took over supervision. Production numbers grew quickly – the millionth Beetle was produced in 1955. In 1950, production of the VW Transporter (Type 2) began in Wolfsburg. Due to the high demand, the factory was expanded further in the following years, but the limits of expansion options became apparent by the mid-1950s, so new locations became necessary. Transporter construction was moved to the new Hanover factory in 1956. In the summer of 1958, aggregate processing found a new location at the Kassel plant. The 13-story brick VW administration tower was built between 1957 and 1959, and housed the company headquarters until 2013.

After the Berlin Wall was built in 1961, the inner German border became increasingly impermeable and the previous influx of workers from the GDR stopped, so guest workers from Italy were recruited. On 17 January 1962, the first Italian guest workers arrived at the Wolfsburg train station; a barracks camp was built to accommodate them east of the plant, which was colloquially known as the Italian Village. In 1963, due to the working and living conditions, a revolt by Italian guest workers resulted in one death, which led to police intervention. In 1966, two pedestrian tunnels leading into the factory premises were opened, which cross under the railway line and the Mittelland Canal. In 1967–68, the Ehra-Lessien test site was built around 20 kilometres (12 mi) north of the factory because the test tracks available on the Wolfsburg factory premises no longer met the increased requirements due to the increasing variety of models.

In 1971, today's technical development high-rise building was completed, and in 1972 the newly built health centre on Südstrasse opened.

=== Since 1974 ===
The last of more than 11.9 million Beetles built at the main factory left the Wolfsburg production line on 1 July 1974, and the Golf took over. The new education centre was opened on 9 June 1981, at which Josef Stingl, President of the Federal Employment Agency, was also present. In 1982, the highly automated Hall 54 with industrial robots was put into operation. On 25 August 1995, a concert by the rock band The Rolling Stones took place in the east factory parking lot, which was attended by around 100,000 people. In 1999, the forced labour memorial was opened on the grounds of the Volkswagen factory.

In June 2000, the Volkswagen Group opened the Autostadt for Expo 2000. The 33,333,333rd car produced at the Wolfsburg plant rolled off the assembly line on 26 November 2001. On 3 June 2007, Volkswagen celebrated the anniversary of 25 million Golfs with a party. In 2016, the VW administration tower was reopened as the headquarters of the Volkswagen brand under the name Markenhochhaus (lit. 'brand tower').

In 2020, which was characterized by coronavirus restrictions, only just under 500,000 cars were produced in Wolfsburg; capacity utilization at the plant was also low in the first three quarters of 2021. Many employees were on short-time work. In June 2020, the purchase premium for electric cars was increased in Germany; this contributed to the shift in demand. The Trinity electric car project is to be produced at the Wolfsburg plant; production is scheduled to start in 2026.

=== List of plant managers ===
- 1939–1941: Otto Dyckhoff
- 1941–1945: Anton Piëch
- 1945–1946: Rudolf Brörmann
- 1946–1947: Karl Huland
- 1947–1959: Wilhelm Steinmeier
- 1959–1971: Otto Höhne
- 1971–1972: Günter Hartwich
- 1972–1988: Helmut Amtenbrink
- 1989–1991: Folker Weißgerber
- 1992–1995: Hans-Jürgen Liedigk
- 1995–1996: Hans-Joachim Paul
- 1996–1998: Gerald Weber
- 1999–2004: Werner Neubauer
- 2004–2007: Dietmar Korzekwa
- 2007–2014: Siegfried Fiebig
- 2014–2016: Jens Herrmann
- 2016–2020: Stefan Loth
- 2021–2024: Rainer Fessel
- 2024–present: Uwe Schwartz

== Cars in production ==
- Volkswagen Golf
- Volkswagen Tiguan
- Volkswagen Tayron

== See also ==
- Autostadt
- Volkswagen currywurst
