= Chip fork =

Small wood or plastic fork used for eating fast food

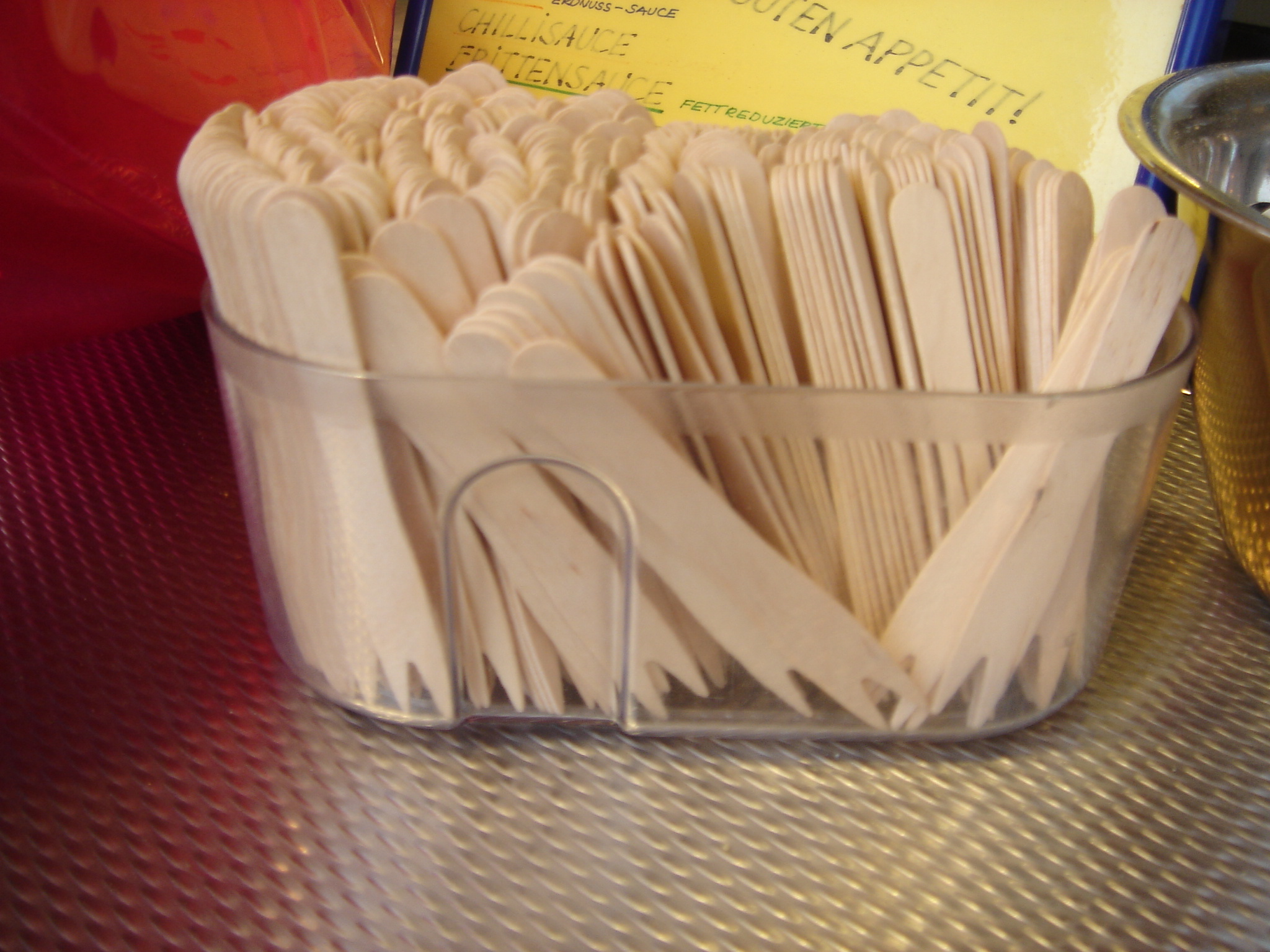
Two-tined wooden chip forks in a container

A chip fork is a small fork made from wood or plastic that is given away by fast food suppliers with portions of fish and chips, french fries, currywurst, and similar, and used when eating. Chip forks are specially designed to keep eaters' fingers clean of grease, sauces, mayonnaise, and other, while at the same time being cheap enough to be thrown away after use. Thus they spare suppliers the cost and labour of collecting and cleaning traditional forks. This fits well with the image of fast food as kinds of products to be taken away and being consumed elsewhere.

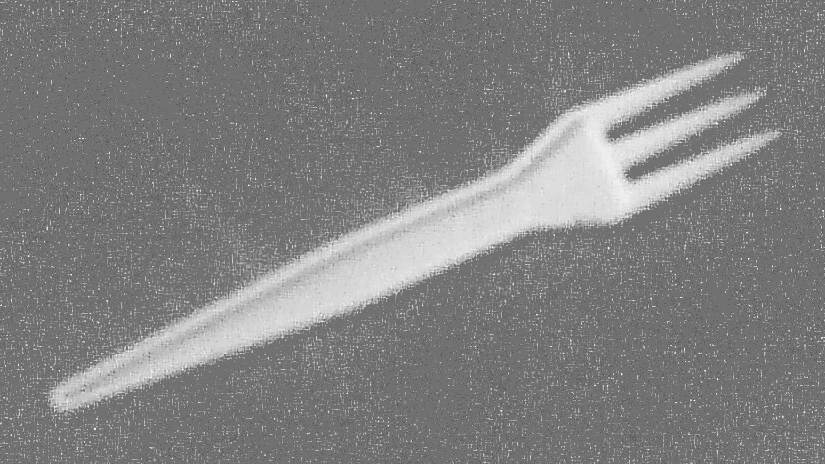
A three-tined plastic chip fork

The usual design of chip forks has either two or three tines at one end. Their length is somewhere between 7½ and 9 cm, their width between 1 and 1½ cm at the widest place.

== Other meanings ==
In Germany, Pommesgabel or Pommespicker (literally "chip-picking device") is a local term for the mano cornuta, or sign of the horns.
