= Deutsches Currywurst Museum =

Coordinates: 52.5088°N 13.3912°E

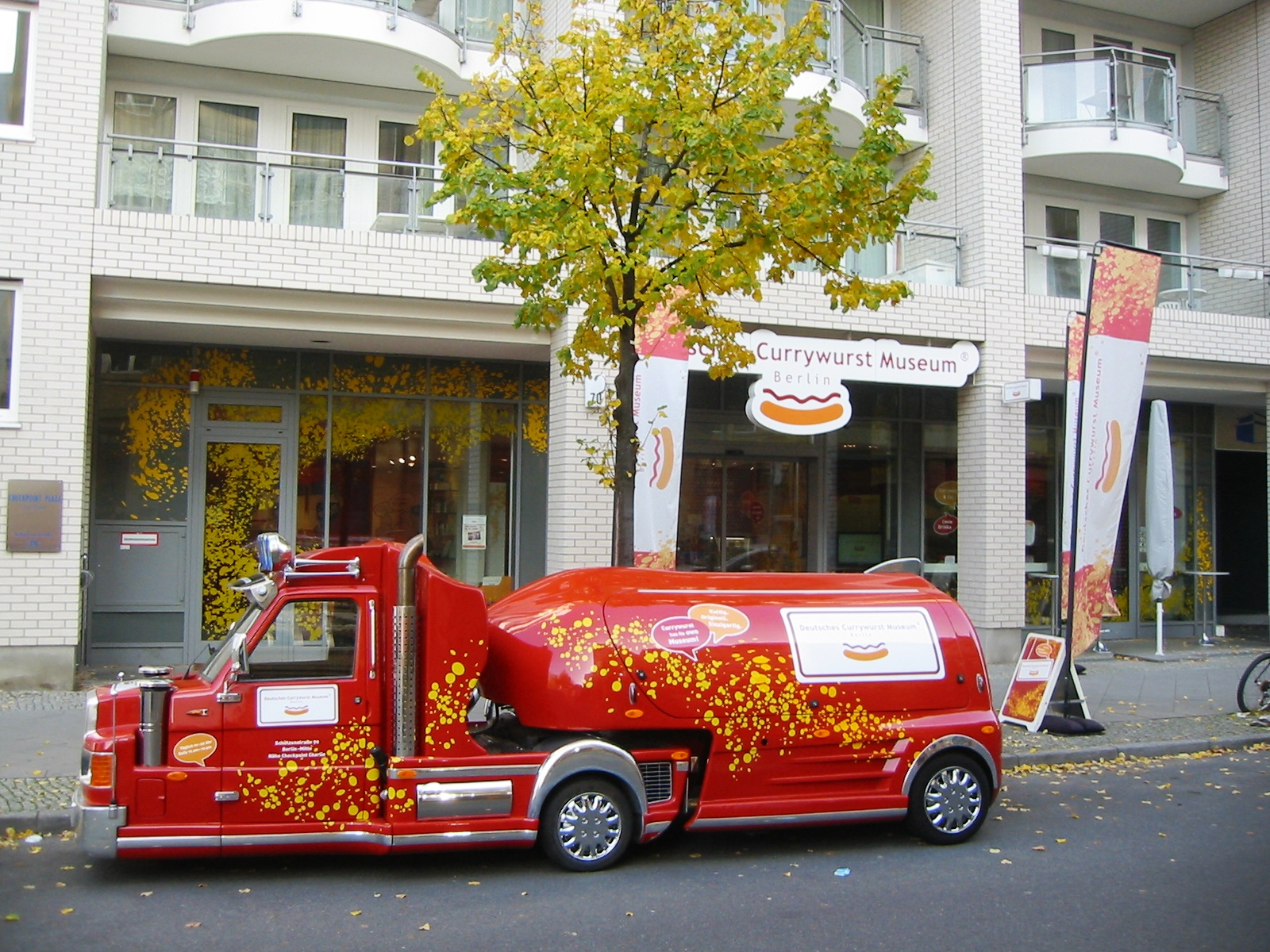
- Established: 2009
- Dissolved: 2018
- Location: Berlin, Germany
- Type: Food museum
- Website: currywurstmuseum.com/en/

The Deutsches Currywurst Museum was a museum in Berlin dedicated to German currywurst sausage.

The museum was located in Berlin-Mitte near Checkpoint Charlie and was the first and only museum about currywurst. The museum received approximately 350,000 visitors annually.

The museum has been permanently closed since 21 December 2018.

== History ==
The museum opened on 15 August 2009, 60 years after the invention of currywurst in 1949 by Berliner Herta Heuwer. Museum founder, Martin Löwer came up with the idea for the museum during a holiday trip to Jamaica. There he visited an exhibition about the yam root and started thinking about what food type would be as popular in Berlin. Löwer considered the currywurst to possess "cult status" in Germany and used the sausage's fame as justification to create the museum.

== Exhibit ==
Patrons followed a "sauce trail" through the history of currywurst. The museum was interactive, with exhibits and displays aimed at engaging the senses of sight, smell and sound. Highlights included a spice chamber with sniffing stations, a sausage-shaped sofa, audio stations playing currywurst-themed songs, and a virtual currywurst making game called "Curry Up!" The museum also had special installations at children's eye-level.
