= Herta Heuwer =

German chef

- Born: Herta Charlotte Pöppel; 30 June 1913; Königsberg, Prussia, German Reich (now Kaliningrad, Kaliningrad Oblast, Russia)
- Died: 13 July 1999 (aged 86); Berlin, Germany
- Known for: invention of the Currywurst

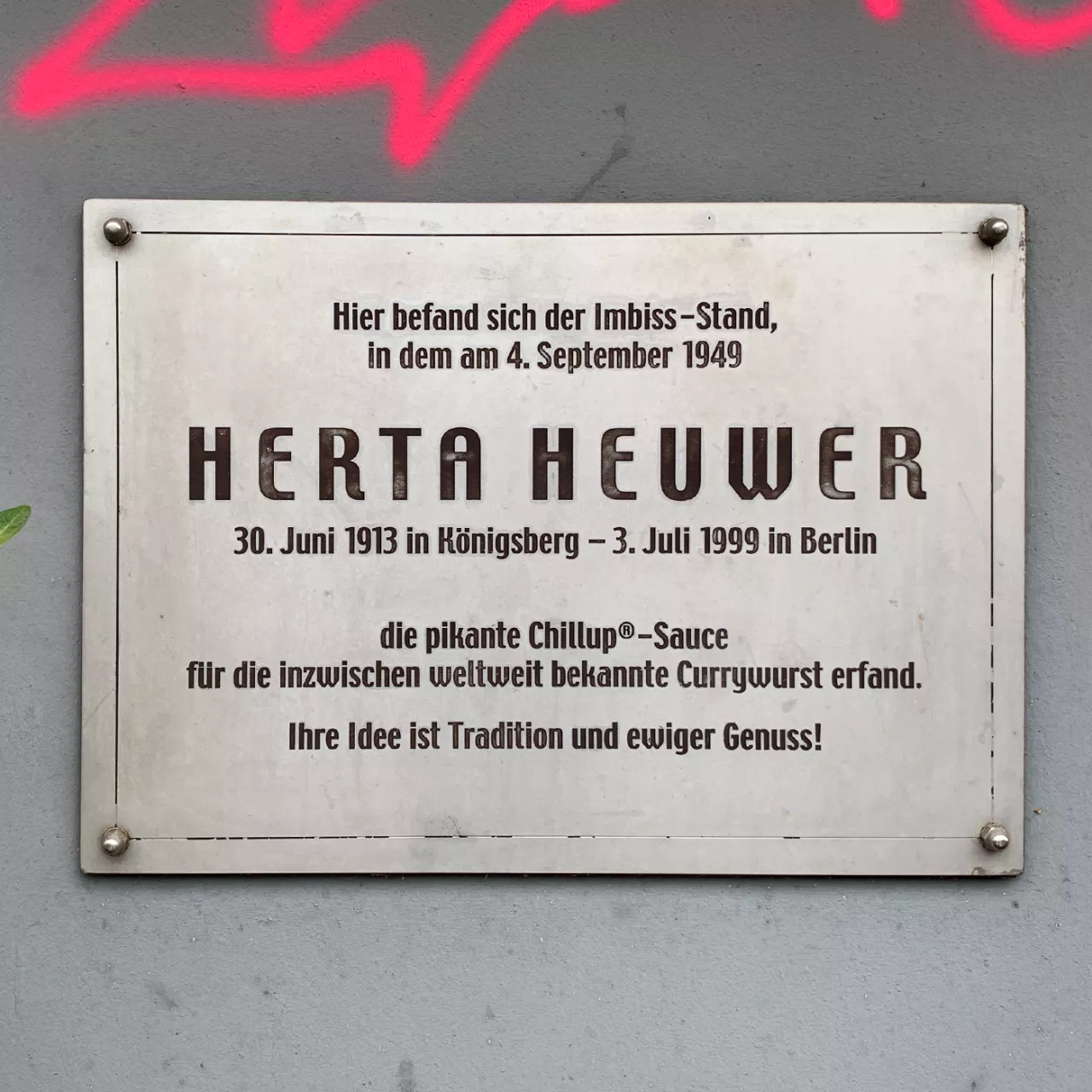
A commemorative plaque for Herta Heuwer

Herta Charlotte Heuwer (née Pöppel; 30 June 1913 – 3 July 1999) was a German chef. She owned and ran a food kiosk in West Berlin. Heuwer is frequently credited with the invention of the take-away dish that would become the currywurst, supposedly on 4 September 1949. The original currywurst was a boiled sausage, fried, with a sauce of tomato paste, Worcestershire sauce, curry powder and other ingredients.

Heuwer was born in Königsberg. In January 1951, she registered a trademark for her sauce, Chillup.

Heuwer moved her business to a larger facility at Kaiser-Friedrich-Straße 59, which, during its heyday, was open day and night and employed 19 saleswomen. On 29 June 2003, the day before what would have been her 90th birthday, a commemorative plaque was unveiled by Charlottenburg Mayor Monika Thiemen at the site where Herta Heuwer invented the currywurst. Heuwer died in Berlin, aged 86. The Berlin Currywurst is now a protected commodity, officially and properly recognized by the German Patent and Trademark Office.

In her honor, the Berlin State Mint minted a commemorative medal in 2019 to mark the 70th anniversary of the invention of the currywurst, on which she is depicted together with two currywursts.

On 30 June 2013, the centenary of Heuwer's birthday, was celebrated with a Google Doodle.

== Other claims to currywurst ==
Two authors, Tim Koch and Gregor Lauenburger, argued that currywursts had been sold by Dutch-born Peter Hildebrand since 1936 at Peter Pomm’s Pusztetten-Stube in Duisburg. The curry powder was ordered from Hamburg, as "English recipe curry powder".

Other sources claim that currywurst was invented in Hamburg. Author Uwe Timm contends in his novel The Discovery of Currywurst that he had eaten currywurst in Hamburg as early as 1947, but the inventor of currywurst in his novel, Lena Brücker, is an admitted literary license. However, that did not prevent the former Hamburg Senator of the Interior Ronald Schill from honoring Lena Brücker in 2003.

Food historians such as Petra Foede believe that, as with most culinary creation myths, several rather than a single person were involved in developing this dish, sausage sellers experimenting with various spice mixes in order to replace the tomato ketchup that was unavailable during the immediate postwar years.
