= Uwe Timm =

German writer (born 1940)

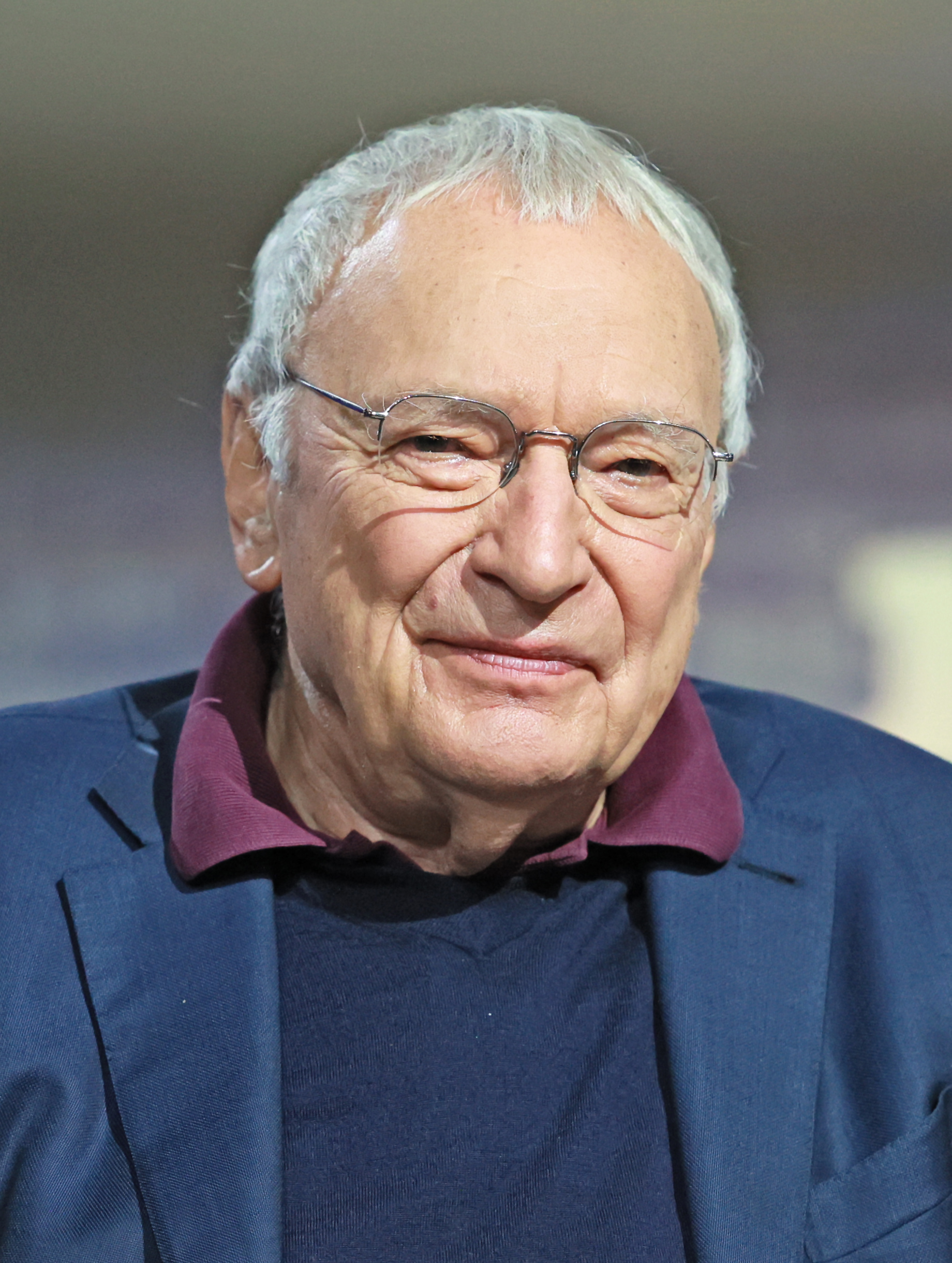
- Timm (2023)
- Born: 30 March 1940 (age 86); Bad Kreuznach, Germany
- Education: LMU Munich
- Occupation: Writer
- Employer(s): Washington University in St. Louis; Swansea University; University of Warwick
- Spouse: Dagmar Ploetz
- Children: 4
- Writing career
- Period: 1971–present
- Notable works: Am Beispiel meines Bruders, Rennschwein Rudi Rüssel,
- Notable awards: Heinrich-Böll-Preis; 2009; Deutscher Jugendliteraturpreis; 1990

Uwe Timm (German pronunciation: [ˈuːvə tɪm]; born 30 March 1940 in Hamburg) is a German writer.

== Life and work ==
Uwe Timm was born in 1940 in Bad Kreuznach, and was the youngest son in his family. His brother, 16 years his senior, was a soldier in the Waffen-SS and died in Ukraine in 1943. Decades later, Uwe Timm dealt with his relationship with his father and brother in the critically acclaimed novel In My Brother's Shadow.

After working as a furrier, Timm studied Philosophy and German at LMU Munich and the University of Paris, achieving a PhD in German literature in 1971 with his thesis The Problem of Absurdity in the Works of Albert Camus. During his studies, Timm was engaged in leftist activities of the 1960s. He became a member of the Socialist German Student Union and was associated with Benno Ohnesorg. From 1973 to 1981, he was a member of the German Communist Party. Three times Timm was appointed writer-in-residence at universities in English-speaking countries: in 1981 at the University of Warwick, in 1994 at Swansea University, and in 1997 at Washington University in St. Louis. He has also been a lecturer at Paderborn University, Technische Universität Darmstadt, Leuphana University of Lüneburg, and Goethe University Frankfurt.

Timm started publishing in the early 1970s and became known to a larger audience in Germany after one of his children's books, Rennschwein Rudi Rüssel, was turned into the movie Rudy, the Racing Pig (1995). Today he is one of the most successful contemporary authors in Germany. His books Die Entdeckung der Currywurst (The Invention of Curried Sausage) and Am Beispiel meines Bruders (In My Brother's Shadow, or literally: "By My Brother's Example") can both be found in the syllabi of German schools. His readers usually appreciate Timm's writing style, which he himself calls "die Ästhetik des Alltags" ("the aesthetics of everyday life"). Timm uses everyday vocabulary and simple sentences and generally tries to imitate the way stories are orally told. His works often indirectly connect with each other by taking a minor character from one story and making this character the main character of another work. For example, a minor character like Frau Brücker from Johannisnacht becomes a main character in Die Entdeckung der Currywurst. Timm's works also tend to have autobiographical features and often deal with, or are set in, the German past.

== Awards ==
- 1995 Bavarian Film Award, Best Young People's Film
- 1990 Deutscher Jugendliteraturpreis for Rennschwein Rudi Rüssel
- 2009 Heinrich-Böll-Preis
- 2012 Carl Zuckmayer Medal
- 2021 Lessing Prize of the Free and Hanseatic City of Hamburg
- 2026 Goethe Prize of the City of Frankfurt

== Bibliography ==
- Widersprüche, Poems (1971)
- Heißer Sommer (1974)
- Wolfenbüttlerstr. 57, Poems (1977)
- Morenga (1978)
- Kerbels Flucht (1980)
- Die deutschen Kolonien, Photo book (1981)
- Die Zugmaus, Children's book (1981)
- Die Piratenamsel, Children's book (1983)
- Der Mann auf dem Hochrad (1984)
- Der Schlangenbaum (1986)
- Rennschwein Rudi Rüssel, Children's book (1989)
- Vogel, friss die Feige nicht (1989)
- Der Kopfjäger (1991)
- Die Piratenamsel, Children's book (1991)
- Erzählen und kein Ende, A collection of speeches (1993)
- Die Entdeckung der Currywurst (1993)
- Der Schatz auf Pagensand (1995)
- Johannisnacht (1996)
- Nicht morgen, nicht gestern, Short stories (1999)
- Rot, novel (2001), awarded the 2003 Schubart-Literaturpreis
- Am Beispiel meines Bruders (2003)
- Der Freund und der Fremde (2005)
- Halbschatten (2008)
- Freitisch (2011)
- Vogelweide (2013)
- Ikarien (2017)

=== English translations ===
- The Snake Tree, 1989
- Headhunter, 1994
- The Invention of Curried Sausage, 1995
- Midsummer Night, 1998
- Morenga, 2003
- In My Brother's Shadow: A Life and Death in the SS, 2005
