= List of accompaniments to French fries =

French fries are often salted, and are served with a variety of condiments, notably ketchup, curry, curry ketchup, curry sauce, hot or chili sauce, mustard, mayonnaise, salad cream, honey mustard, bearnaise sauce, remoulade, tartar sauce, tzatziki, garlic sauce, fry sauce, burger sauce, ranch dressing, barbecue sauce, gravy, brown sauce, Worcestershire sauce, vinegar (especially malt vinegar or a cheaper "non-brewed condiment" alternative), aioli, butter, honey, feta cheese, lemon, piccalilli, pickled cucumber, gherkins, very small pickled onions, mushy peas, baked beans, pickled eggs, sour cream and fresh cheese curds (especially in Canada).

== Australia ==
In Australia, French fries (which Australians call "chips" or "hot chips") are common in fast food shops, cafes, casual dining and pubs. In fast food shops, fries may be sold by dollar amount, customers may order for instance "$10 worth of chips" or "the minimum chips" which is the smallest amount of chips the shop will fry at once, differing per shop. At other shops, fries may be sold by container size (e.g.: small, medium, large, family).

Fries are often coated in chicken salt, a savoury, salty seasoning which was invented in South Australia but is now popular across the country. Alternatively customers may ask for plain salt or no salt. Fries may be served with sauces such as tomato ketchup (which Australians call "tomato sauce"), barbecue sauce or aoli (common at cafes, casual dining and pubs). Gravy may be poured over the chips, or sold in a separate container.

A halal snack pack (sometimes called a snack pack or HSP) is a fast food item that consists of fries topped with salt or chicken salt, doner kebab meat, grated cheddar cheese and a sauce such as garlic sauce, chili sauce or barbecue sauce, or a combination. The dish arose in the late 20th century as a culinary fusion between the cuisine of Middle-Eastern Australians and European Australians.

== Belgium ==
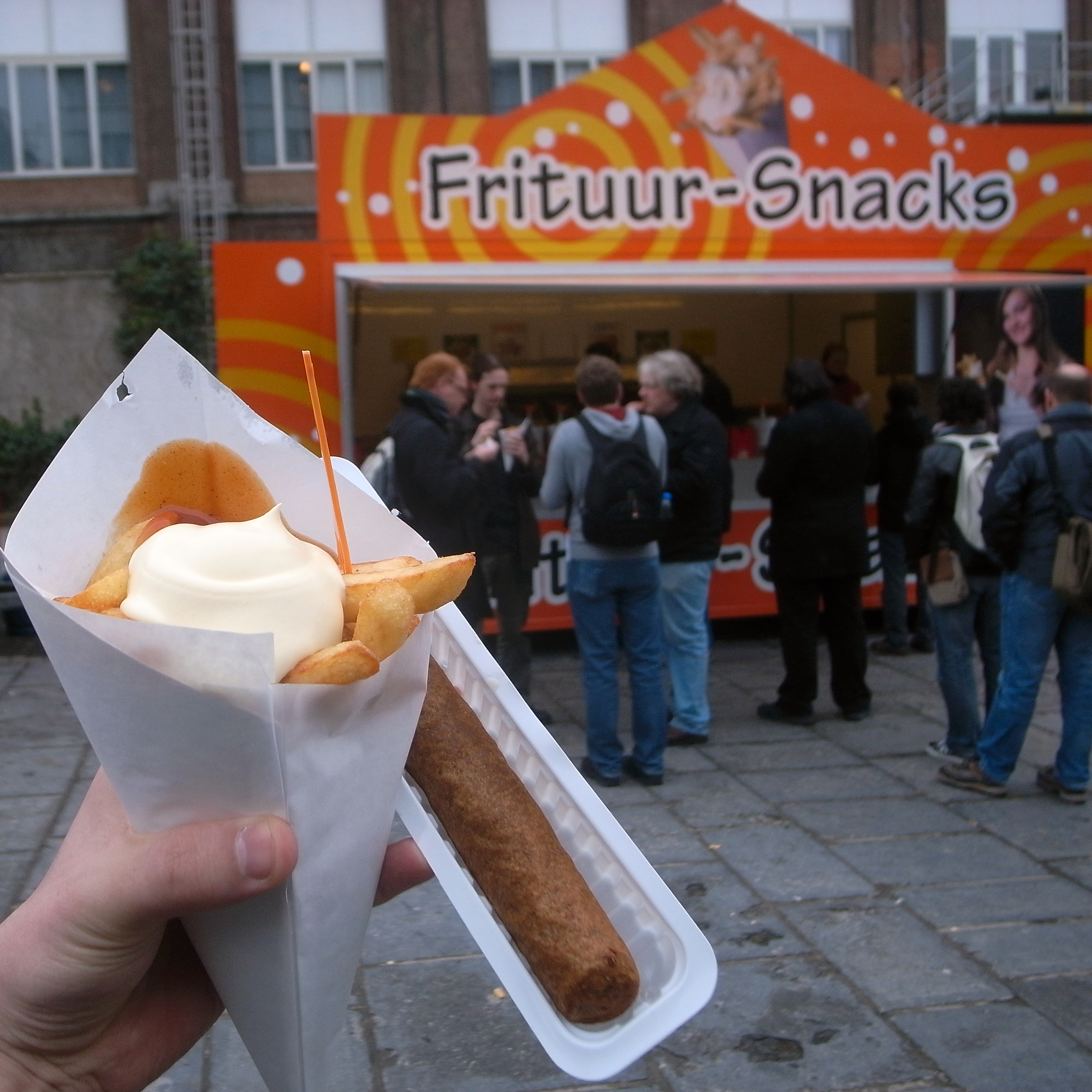
French fries wrapped in a traditional paper cone, served with mayonnaise and curry ketchup, with a small plastic fork on top and a frikandel on the side. The frietkot is seen in the background.

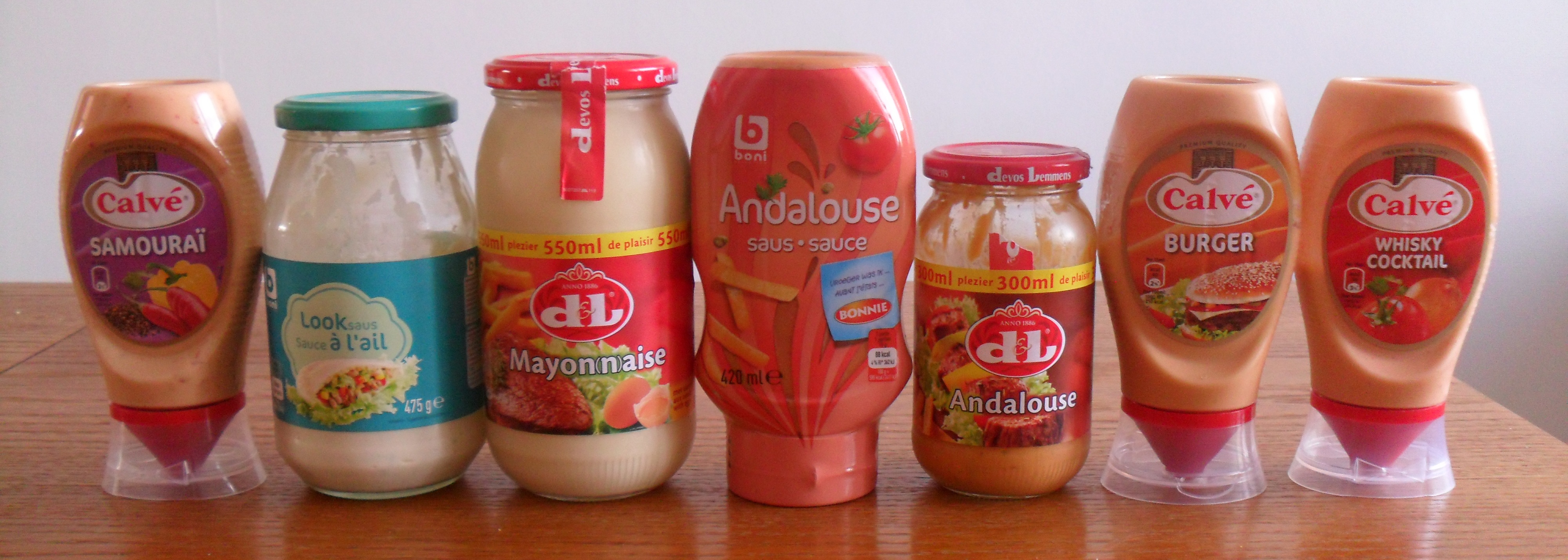
An assortment of Belgian sauces

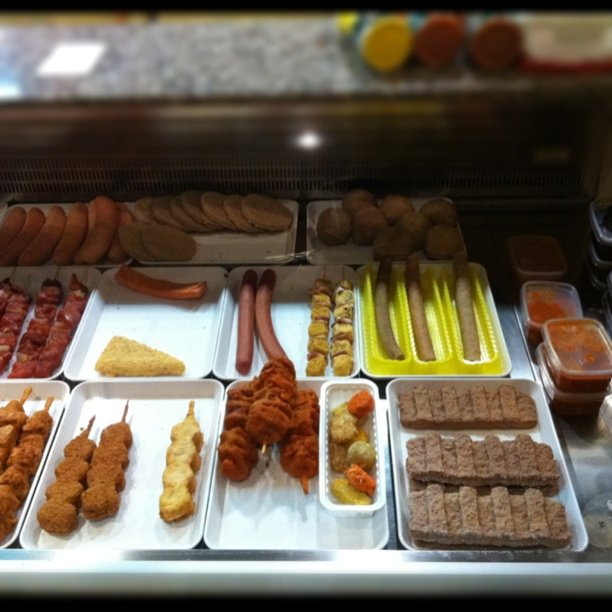
A typical assortment of meats offered at a Belgian friterie

Even the smallest Belgian town has a frietkot (literally, "fries shack"). Traditionally, take-away fries were picked by the fingers out of a tip bag wrapped from a square sheet of paper, while walking on the streets. By the 1970s and 1980s, with several meat accompaniments gaining popularity, more practical open carton boxes and tiny plastic forks became available. One can order a small or large portion; often three or four sizes are priced. Fries with mayonnaise or one of a wide variety of other typical Belgian sauces is a fast food classic in Belgium, often eaten without any side orders. Prior to 1960, the choice of accompanying items was limited to a pickled herring, a large, cold meatball boulet or red-coloured garlic sausage cervela, or a beef or horsemeat stew. Since 1960, choices include stoofvlees or stoofkarbonade and a wide variety of deep-fried meats, such as chicken legs, beef or pork sticks, minced beef, pork, chicken, or turkey in all shapes (balls, sticks, sausages) mixed with a dosage of fat and condiments to one's preference. An example of an additional on-the-spot preparation is sometimes in Flanders called mammoet speciaal (mammoth special), a large frikandel (curryworst in Antwerp and Flemish Brabant) deep-fried and cut so as to put chopped onion in the V-shaped length and dressed with mayonnaise and (curry-)ketchup. The earliest of the current wide array of sauces, are mayonnaise, fritessaus or sauce pommes-frites ("fries sauce" in English—see the sections on France and the Netherlands) and a local pickle-sauce similar to piccalilli. Though Belgians do not sprinkle vinegar on fries, they may eat them with cold mussels out of the shells preserved in vinegar, entirely different to the national dish with freshly boiled hot mussels served in the shells.

== Bulgaria ==
In Bulgaria, a serving of fries can be ordered with a covering of sirene, a grated white brine cheese.

== Canada ==
In Canada, French fries are the main component of a dish called poutine, a mixture of French fries with fresh cheese curds, covered with a hot gravy (usually), hot chicken sauce (much less common), or chicken BBQ sauce (rarely). This dish was invented in rural Quebec in the late 1950s and is now popular in many parts of the country and is served at many fast-food chains. Several Québécois communities claim to be the birthplace of poutine. A variant, "disco fries", may be found in the Northeastern United States, notably in New Jersey.

In Newfoundland, "chips, dressing and gravy" (referred to by outsiders as "Newfie fries") comprise French fries topped with "dressing" (turkey stuffing made with summer savory) and gravy. Another variation consists of topping the French fries with either ground beef, hot dogs, dressing and cheese and topped with gravy. Yet another Newfoundland recipe called a "mess" (compare with "poutine") consists of fries, gravy, dressing, and wieners.

In Prince Edward Island, "fries with the works" (or FWTW as it is sometimes called) is a combination of French fries, fried hamburger, fried onions, gravy (usually beef), peas, and optionally mushrooms. Other common toppings include green onions, tomatoes, carrots, sour cream, and grated cheese.

In the Ottawa Valley, French fries are sold from trucks known as "chip wagons," and fries are available topped with melted butter. It is also customary for the server to allow the customer to add seasonings like salt, pepper, and vinegar halfway through filling the container.

== Finland ==
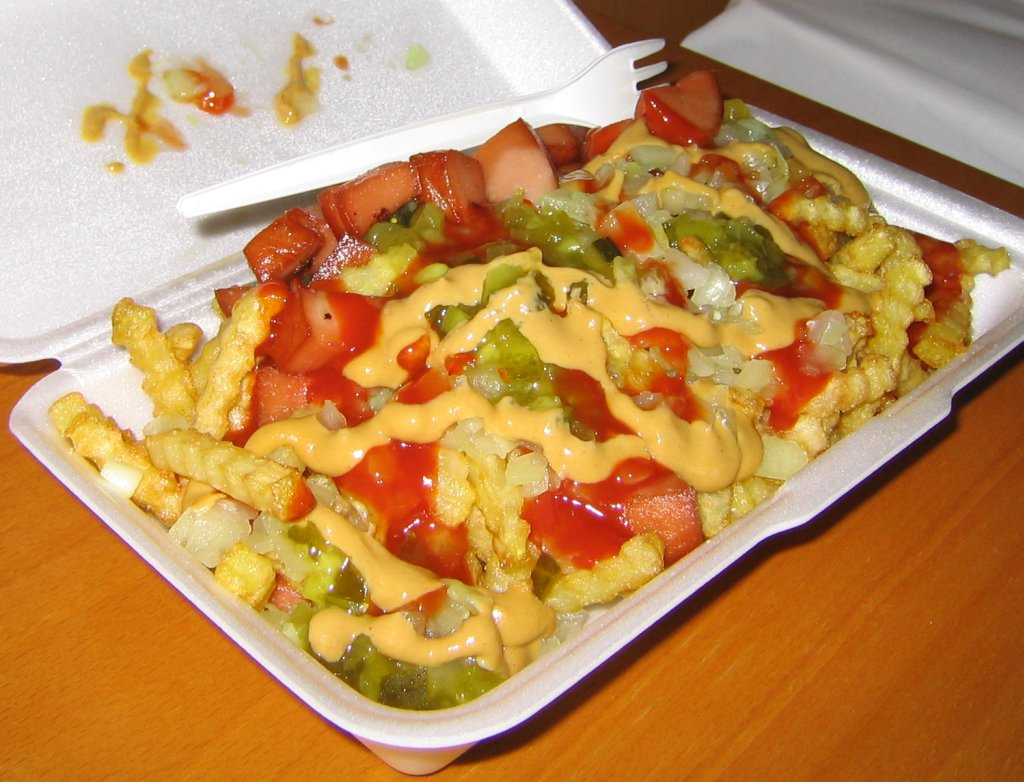
Finnish makkaraperunat is topped with mustard, ketchup, chopped onions, cucumber pickle relish and sometimes a mayonnaise-based sauce.

In Finland, French fries (Finnish: ranskalaiset perunat) are colloquially known just as ranskalaiset (literally, "the French"). In colloquial use, this is sometimes shortened even further to ranet or ranut, which unambiguously only refers to French fries.

A traditional way of serving accompanied fries at food carts (grilli) is makkaraperunat (literally, "sausage potatoes"), a dish consisting of deep-fried slices of sausage and crinkle-cut fries mixed together and usually served in either a paper or styrofoam tray. The dish probably originated in the early 1960s. Today, makkaraperunat is mainly considered a late-night snack and is usually not served outside of food carts or gas stations.

At fast food chains such as McDonald's, Burger King or the indigenous Hesburger, ketchup is always provided. Some chains also offer complimentary Finnish or American style mustard as well as packets of grillimauste, a type of barbecue rub. In kebab shops, fries are often partly or entirely covered in tomato-based and/or yoghurt-based kebab sauces and döner kebab strips. French fries are also used as sides for hamburgers, steaks and deep-fried meats at the ubiquitous American style restaurants and gastropubs in Finland. Crinkle-cut fries are seen as old-fashioned and associated with food carts or home-cooking, while straight-cut fries are seen as more modern.

== France ==
In France, a common dish is fries and a steak. French fries are also popular as a side dish to kebabs, roasted or fried chicken, and hamburgers. The fries are often accompanied by ketchup, mayonnaise, Dijon mustard, and sometimes a vaguely béarnaise-like sauce called "sauce pommes frites" (found also under the same name and with a similar form in French-speaking Belgium, and in Dutch-speaking Belgium and the Netherlands as fritessaus), which is available at local McDonald's restaurants and in bottled form in supermarkets.

== Iceland ==
In Iceland, French fries are served either salted or seasoned with a special blend of spices (including salt, sugar, onion powder, garlic powder, black pepper, MSG, and various other seasonings) marketed as French Fry Mix (kartöflukrydd), and accompanied by cocktail sauce or ketchup. Fries are commonly sold in fast food outlets as a side dish. The earliest mention of French fries in Iceland is in a cookbook published in 1945, under the title Potatoes boiled in lard.

== Ireland ==
In Ireland French fries are generally known as 'chips' (aside from the 'skinny' fries commonly served in some fast-food outlets). The accompaniments and condiments served with them are very similar to those served in the United Kingdom.

== Japan ==
Some Japanese restaurants, such as First Kitchen, offer a variety of flavour packets that can be used to season the French fries. The packets consist of powdered flavouring and salt.

== Malaysia and Singapore ==
In Malaysia and Singapore, chips or fries are often served with Western food dishes and usually served with tomato ketchup and chilli sauce, or sometimes "Chilli-Tomato" Sauce (if they mix chilli sauce with tomato ketchup together).

== Netherlands ==
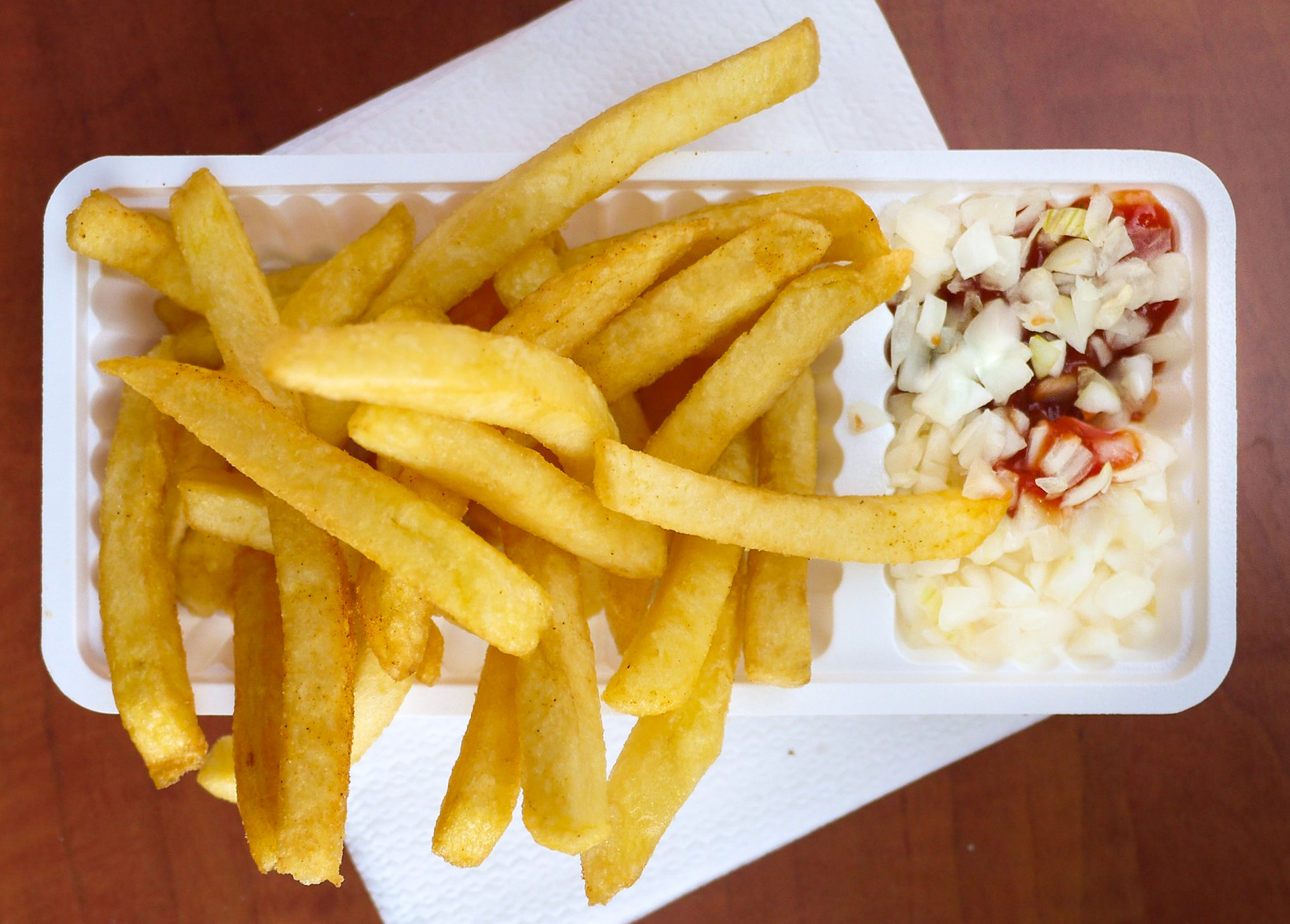
Fries with "speciaal saus" is a popular combination in the Netherlands.

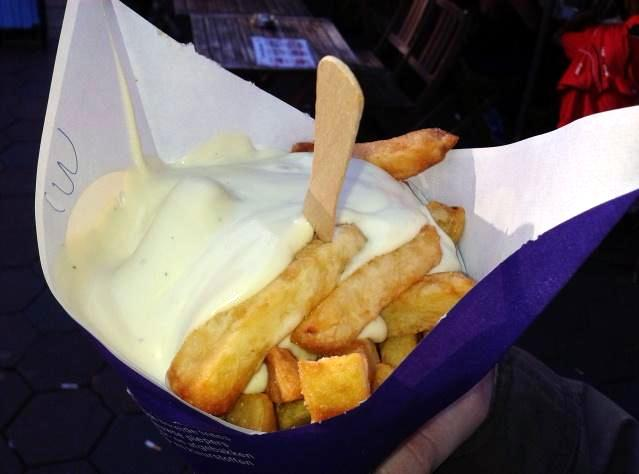
Fries with "wietsaus" (weed sauce), available in Amsterdam

In the Netherlands, fries are popular as fast food and served in vending points similar to the ones in Belgium. Fries are served with mayonnaise or a lower-fat version called fritessaus (fries sauce), although the latter is often also referred to as mayonnaise. This combination is usually called patatje met (for "fries with"), as opposed to patatje zonder (fries without, without any sauce).

Other popular sauces are satésaus (satay sauce, a peanut sauce that is also served with the Indonesian meat sate), curry ketchup, and speciaal (special; a mixture of chopped raw onions, frietsaus, and curry ketchup or tomato ketchup). Another interesting combination is Patatje Oorlog (Dutch for French Fries War), which is French fries with mayonnaise, sate sauce, and onions, a variety that differs from region to region, and even from one snackbar to another. While it sometimes means mayonnaise (or rather, fritessaus, or fries sauce), peanut sauce and chopped raw onions, in other places it means the fries are accompanied with all condiments available.

On average, Dutch snackbars typically offer between 9 and 10 different condiments to be eaten with fries, or to be combined (the condiments are rarely free in Dutch snackbars), but some venues serve many more. A recently introduced way of serving fries is the kapsalon (hair salon, named so because Nataniël Gomes, a hairdresser from Rotterdam invented the dish), which consists of fries, shoarma (or another kebab style such as Doner), lettuce, molten cheese, hot sauce and garlic sauce in an aluminum foil tray which is then briefly baked in an oven.

Another recent addition to the plethora of accompaniments is Joppiesaus, a mayonnaise-based sauce whose recipe is a trade secret. In 2013 a fast food store in Amsterdam started selling fries with cannabis sauce.

Fries are often accompanied by other popular deep-fried fast foods such as the kroket and frikandel, but fries are also served as a side dish in regular restaurants.

== Philippines ==
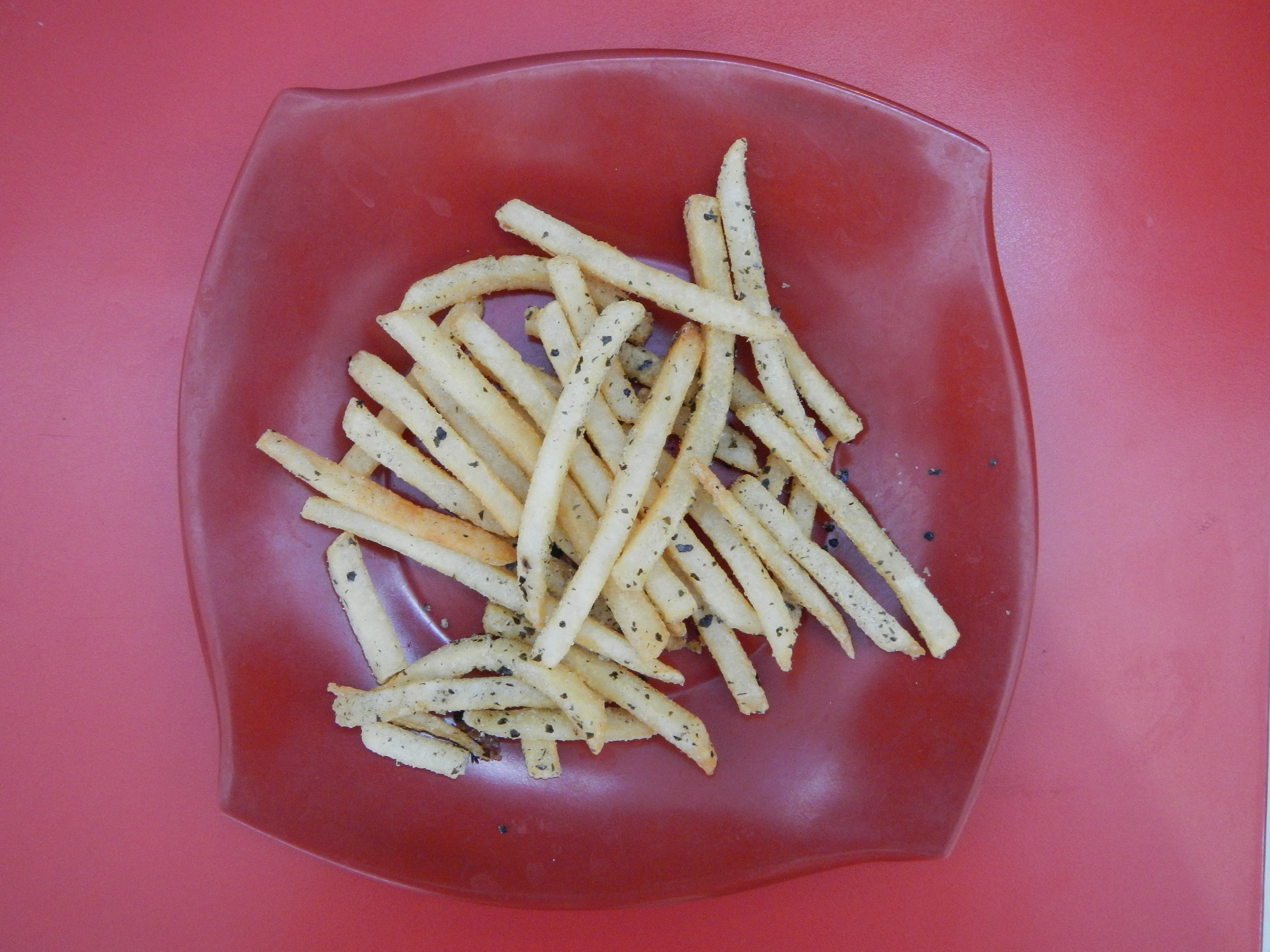
Wasabi potato fries, Tokyo Tokyo

In the Philippines, they are often served with a sprinkling of powdered flavors, primarily cheese, sour cream, or barbecue. In some fast food chains, they are topped with cheese sauce and minced bacon. They also serve fries with ketchup and some restaurants serve it with gravy. Banana ketchup (ketchup made from bananas instead of tomatoes) is also a very popular French fry accompaniment in the Philippines.

== Romania ==
In Romania, fried potatoes are sometimes served with mujdei, a popular garlic sauce, or sprinkled with grated or crumbled brânză (a kind of sheep milk cheese). Fries are a popular side dish with grilled steaks, schnitzels and mititei, and are also a frequent ingredient in shawarmas.

== South Africa ==
In South Africa French fries are generally known as 'chips' (aside from the 'skinny' fries commonly served in some fast-food outlets). They are normally made with potatoes that have been soaked in vinegar beforehand. They are often known as "slap chips" (slap being the word for soft in Afrikaans) as the soaking in vinegar makes them soft and soggy. After cooking they are normally served with accompaniments of salt and vinegar.

== Spain ==
See Patatas bravas.

== Chile ==
Chorrillana and Salchipapa are common examples of fries-centered dishes. In the case of Chorrillana the fries are served with meat (usually beef), Longaniza, onions, and fried eggs. In the case of salchipapas, as indicated by the name, the main accompaniment is sausage. In both cases mustard, ketchup or mayonnaise can be added. A larger dish, closely related to Chorrillana and also based on fries is Lomo a lo pobre.

== Turkey ==
In Turkey, they are popular as a side dish to hamburgers. In fast food restaurants, they are mostly served with ketchup, mayonnaise and dijon mustard. But in the traditional restaurants -especially in sea food restaurants- they are served with a special fries sauce which includes tomatoes, parsley, lemon, garlic and olive oil. Also this special fries sauce is used with a mixture of vegetable fries which includes potatoes, aubergine, green pepper and zucchini.

== Thailand ==
In Thailand, French fries are called man farang thot (Thai: มันฝรั่งทอด; lit. 'deep fried potato') but are also commonly known as fren frai (Thai: เฟรนซ์ฟรายด์, or Thai: เฟรนช์ฟรายด์). Besides being available from the usual Western fast food outlets or in areas with a large Western (tourist) population, they are increasingly popular at local Thai bars and nightlife venues as a snack. French fries in Thailand are usually served with either tomato ketchup or chili sauce.

== United Kingdom ==
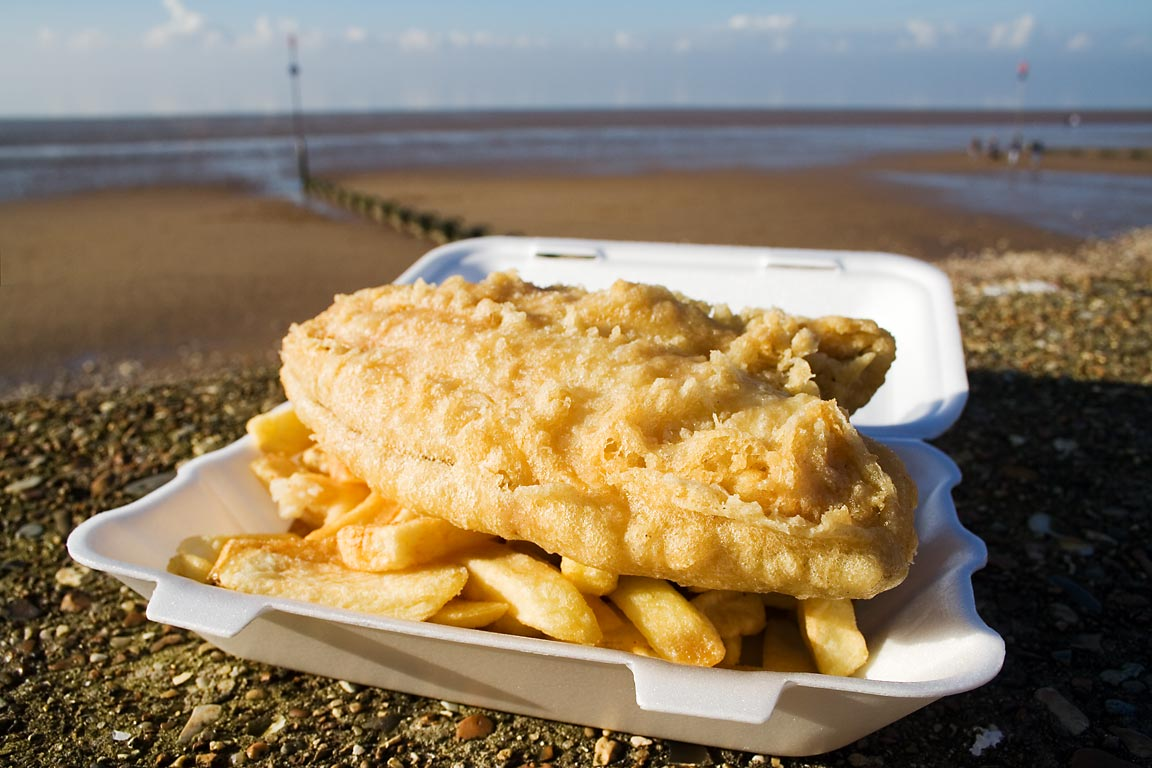
Fish and chips, the original British fast food meal

In the United Kingdom French fries are generally known as 'chips' (aside from the 'skinny' fries commonly served in some fast-food outlets). The archetypal British take-away meal is fish and chips. The traditional accompaniments are table salt and malt vinegar although these days the majority of chip shops and fast food outlets provide a cheaper 'non-brewed condiment' alternative made from acetic acid along with water and ammonia caramel colouring. Other popular accompaniments include tomato ketchup (sometimes known as "red sauce" or "tomato sauce" in certain parts of the country), brown sauce, chippy sauce (brown sauce mixed with vinegar and/or water and popular around the Edinburgh area of Scotland only), barbeque sauce, worcestershire sauce, partially melted cheddar cheese (cheesy chips), mint sauce, mushy peas, baked beans, curry sauce, gravy, mayonnaise, salad cream, aioli, tartare sauce, mustard and chilli sauce.

== United States ==
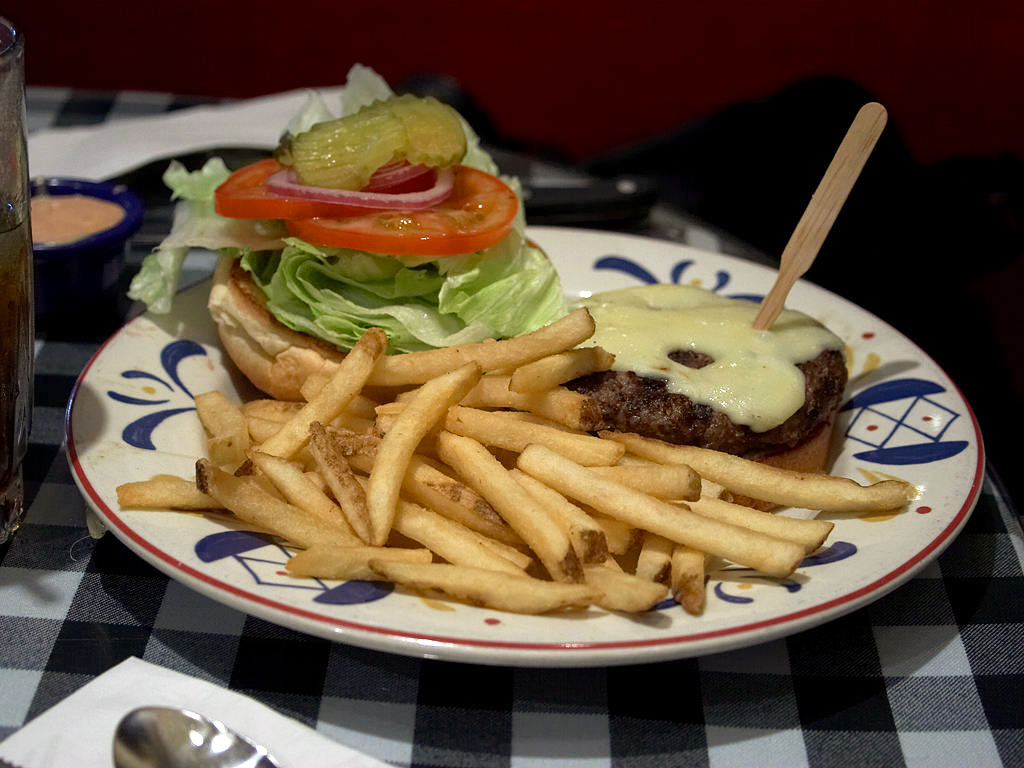
Whole cut fries with a burger, served in an American diner

The consumption of restaurant fries drives ketchup sales throughout the United States. Regionally throughout the nation, other French fry accompaniments are sometimes preferred. Chili cheese fries, loaded fries and cheese fries are common in many communities in diners and fast food chains. Examples of more localized preferences include Texas cheese fries (with melted cheddar and a side of ranch dressing for dipping), New Jersey's disco fries (with brown gravy and mozzarella cheese), and fry sauce (a combination of ketchup and mayonnaise) found in the Intermountain states and Pacific Northwest.

Steak fries are thicker-cut fries, often with the skins intact. They are often coated with spices or marinated before cooking. They may be fried or baked in the oven.

== Vietnam ==
In Vietnam, some restaurants serve fries with sugar over a dollop of soft butter.

== See also ==
- List of condiments
