= Paper cone =

Cone-shaped paper container

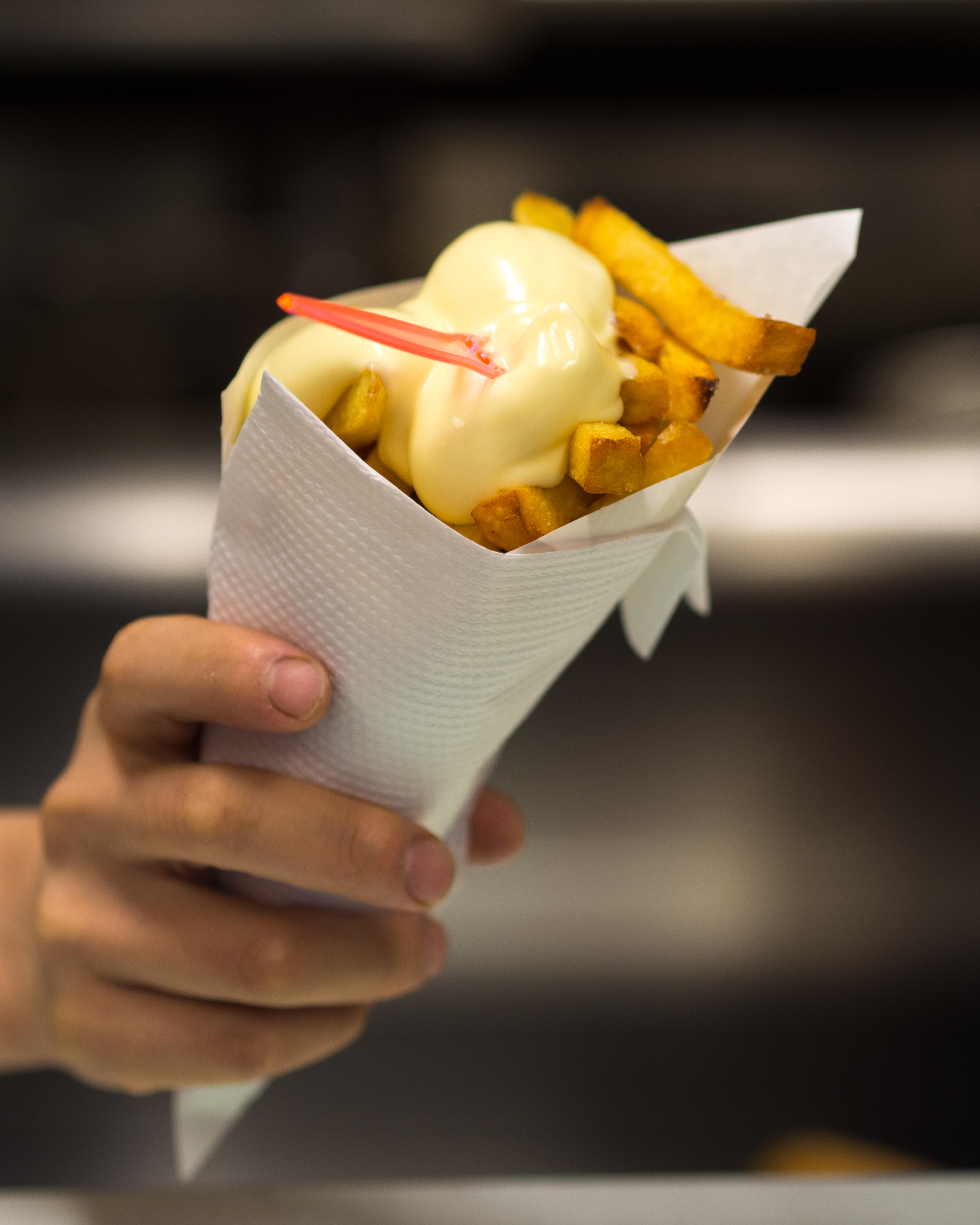
French fries with frietsaus served in a paper cone in The Hague

A paper cone, or cornet, is a cone-shaped container made from a sheet of paper. The name cornet, also used in French, compares its shape to a horn. Paper cones have been used by shopkeepers to package small quantities of goods, including spices and sweets. They can be rolled by hand or manufactured with glued seams. Decorated forms include cones hung on Christmas trees and the larger school cones given to children on their first day at school.

== Construction and use ==
Rolled (left) and glued (right) paper cones

A sheet of paper is rolled into a cone, and the point is bent over to prevent the contents from falling out. Shopkeepers made cones as they served customers, weighing out portions of goods bought in bulk. Cones were used for small retail quantities of medicines, herbs, spices and confectionery. They are also used to serve food for immediate consumption, including French fries.

In Singapore, itinerant sellers traditionally packaged kachang puteh, a nut snack, in cones made from newspaper.

Beyond packaging, cones made from paper are used as loudspeaker diaphragms, parts of blowgun darts, and puppet heads.

Cheap paper and reused printed sheets supplied material for packaging. Before industrial papermaking, bag paper could be made from coarse linen rags. Coloured rags produced wrapping papers in shades such as grey, brown and yellow. In the nineteenth century, inexpensive straw paper was also used for grocers' cones.

== History ==
A paper cone in Pieter Bruegel the Elder's Children's Games (1560)

The paper historian Heinz Schmidt-Bachem identifies a passage attributed to the Roman poet Martial as an early reference to cones made from papyrus. In it, a book is warned that its pages may become wrappers for incense and pepper.

Paper cones appear in Pieter Bruegel the Elder's painting Children's Games (1560). Written accounts also record the reuse of books for packaging. In seventeenth-century London, unsold books were sold to grocers and apothecaries as wrapping material. Books were often kept as unbound sheets until a customer bought them, making this reuse possible.

Paper cones were also called cornucopias in nineteenth-century American English. An 1899 account in Die Gartenlaube described glued, factory-made cones as retaining the shape of the earlier hand-rolled containers.

=== Germany ===
In German, Spitztüte (“pointed bag”) is used for a cone-shaped bag, while Tüte refers to bags of various shapes, including the conical ones. As Schmidt-Bachem notes, this sometimes makes it difficult to tell a shape of bag in a historical source.

In fifteenth-century Nuremberg, metalworkers used paper from Ulman Stromer's mill to make cones and packets for small goods such as needles and thimbles. A medical manual published in 1599 advised apothecaries to make cones like those used by shopkeepers, using waste paper or coloured paper. In his satire of 1640–1643, Johann Michael Moscherosch complained that spice sellers made cones from his books.

==== Industrial production ====
The 19th century brought out the specialized manufacturers that supplied ready-made packaging. Gumpert Bodenheim, a bookbinder, figure out the need for large-scale production after observing bag-making at an orphanage in Kassel in the early 1830s. He planned to lower cost by reusing discarded government records. Negotiations over this material, paper shortages and limited capital delayed the business.

On 18 August 1853, Gumpert Bodenheim and Jacob Plaut opened Bodenheim & Co. in Allendorf an der Werra, Germany, with a foreman and eight women workers. The firm supplied shops, pharmacies and confectioners, taking over work previously done by the businesses themselves. It selected paper grades to suit the size and purpose of each package and planned the cutting of sheets to reduce waste.

Early bag-making machinery was developed alongside hand production. In May 1855, Jacob Isaac Weidmann, a schoolteacher in Hückelhoven, received a Prussian patent for a bag-making machine. By November that year, the local authorities had recorded the machine in operation. Windmöller & Hölscher began designing a bag-making machine in 1872; its first working machine could make simple pointed cones from a roll of paper.

Some factories initially relied on hand production. At Ernst C. Behrens in Alfeld, cones and other paper bags were first made by hand. A gluing machine was introduced in the 1870s, but hand gluing continued well into the 1930s for some printed bags and special orders. Early gluing and printing machinery at Behrens was powered by hand or foot. Steam power was introduced in 1884.

Home-based production and child labor were also used. Friedrich Serong's factory in Höxter, founded in 1857, supplied cut paper to be glued both at the factory and in surrounding villages. The Behrens firm opened a branch in Delligsen in 1871 and later others nearby, helping establish a local cottage industry in bag making. At Heinrich Ludwig's factory in Siebenlehn, when founded in 1860, the workforce included about 50–60 children 10 to 14 years old that made cones and bags by hand after school.

==== Printed packaging ====
Bodenheim & Co. added a printing press in 1854, with a two-color following in 1871. Printed labels with shop names helped identify the contents and advertise the sellers. Seed merchants became important customers for the firm's printed packets and bags, which saved them the work of writing labels by hand. Pharmacies and chemical manufacturers also needed instructions and contents identified on their packaging

At the beginning, the printed patterns reflected the type of business, not an individual trademark. For example, pharmacy packaging carried common shop names such as "Eagle" or "Unicorn", with the proprietor's name and town identifying the particular business. Decorative borders and ornaments borrowed designs from books and other printed matter.

== Decorative uses ==
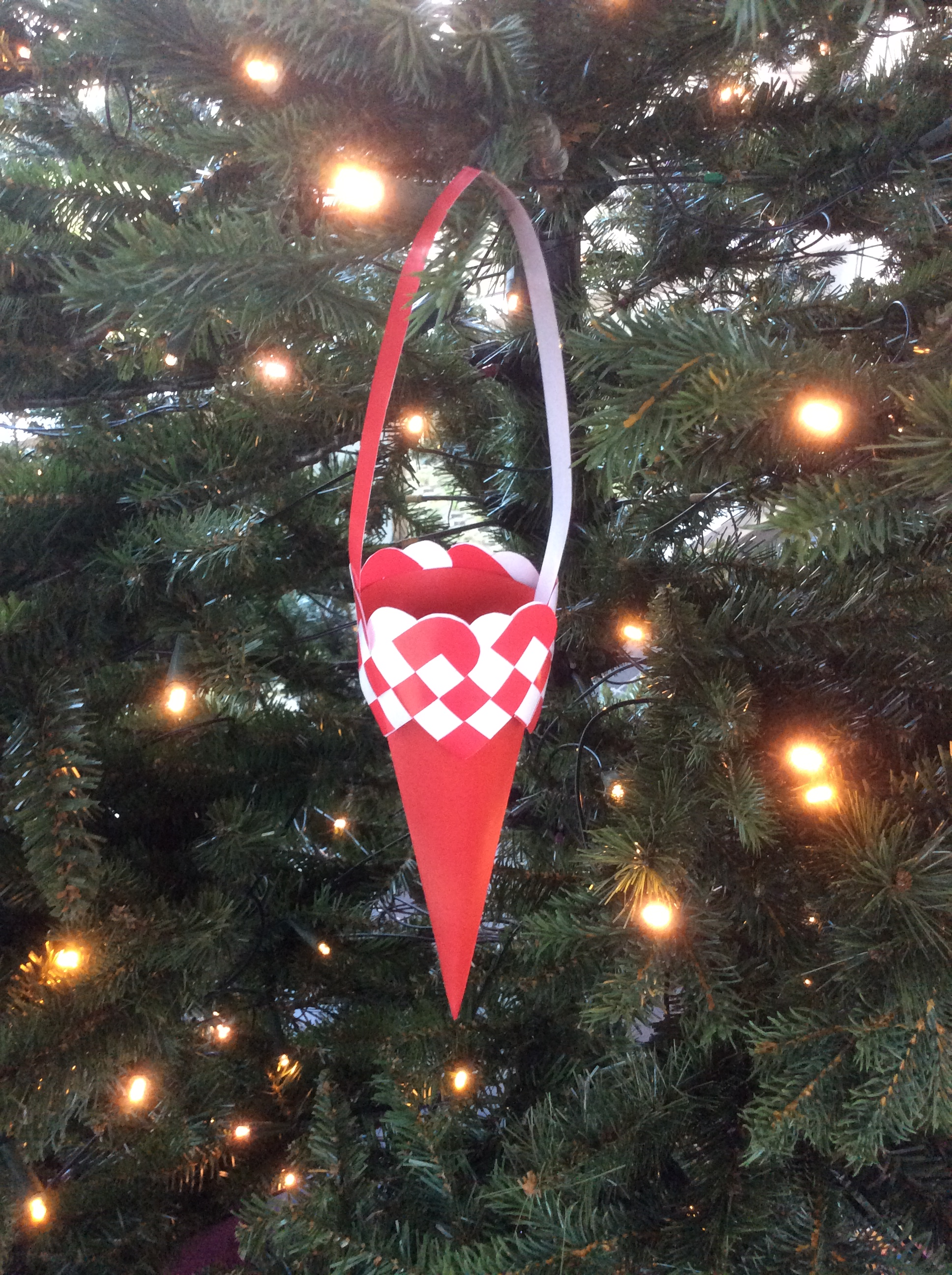
A Danish paper cone hung on a Christmas tree

In Denmark, decorated cones called kræmmerhuse are hung on Christmas trees and filled with sweets. They developed as decorative versions of shopkeepers' packaging. Surviving Danish examples date from 1866 and include a design showing a soldier waving a beech branch.

In German-speaking countries, children receive a Schultüte, or school cone, on their first day of school. This is a decorated cardboard cone filled with sweets, stationery and small gifts. The custom dates to the early nineteenth century.

Another German gift custom used cones of sweets for older siblings when a new child was born or baptised. These were called Storch-Tüten ("stork cones") or Trost-Tüten ("consolation cones").

== See also ==
- Ice cream cone
- Paper bag
- Piping bag

== Sources ==
- Domroese, Margret C.; Sterling, Eleanor J. (1999). Interpreting Biodiversity: A Manual for Environmental Educators in the Tropics (PDF). New York: American Museum of Natural History. ISBN 1930465041.
- Goethe-Institut (n.d.). Der erste Schultag: First Day of School. Teachers' Notes [The first day of school: Teachers' notes] (PDF) (Report).
- R. K. (1899). "Die Papiertüte" [The paper cone]. Die Gartenlaube (in German): 700.
- Schmidt-Bachem, Heinz [in German] (2001). Tüten, Beutel, Tragetaschen: Zur Geschichte der Papier, Pappe und Folien verarbeitenden Industrie in Deutschland [Bags, Pouches, Carrier Bags: A History of the Paper, Paperboard and Film Packaging Industry in Germany] (in German). Münster: Waxmann. ISBN 9783830910374.
- Sonoc, Alexandru Gh.; Brai, Ioan (2023). "A Dragon-Shaped Short Blowgun from Borneo in a Private Collection from Șelimbăr (Sibiu County, Romania)" (PDF). Brukenthal. Acta Musei. 18 (1): 143–210.
- Tarulevicz, Nicole (2018). "Hawkerpreneurs: Hawkers, Entrepreneurship, and Reinventing Street Food in Singapore". Revista de Administração de Empresas. 58 (3): 291–302. doi:10.1590/S0034-759020180309.
- Twede, Diana (2005). "The Origins of Paper Based Packaging". The Future of Marketing's Past: Proceedings of the 12th Conference on Historical Analysis and Research in Marketing. CHARM Association. pp. 288–300.
