= Hella (disambiguation) =

Hella is a slang term meaning "very".

Hella may also refer to:

== Places ==
- Hella, Iceland, a small town in southern Iceland
- Hella, Sogndal, a village in Sogndal Municipality in Vestland county, Norway
- Helle, Sunnfjord (sometimes spelled Hella), a village in Sunnfjord Municipality in Vestland county, Norway

== People ==
- Lindy-Fay Hella, Norwegian singer
- Hella (musician), keyboardist of Finnish band Lordi
- Hella Haasse, (1918-2011), Dutch writer
- Hella Hammid, (1921-1992), German-born American photographer
- Hella Keem, Estonian linguist and ethnographer
- Hella Petri (1916–1999), Hungarian actress
- Hella Ranner, Austrian politician

== Other ==
- Hella (band), a United States math rock band
- Hella (company), a German manufacturer of automobile lighting equipment
- 1370 Hella, an asteroid
- "Hella", a song by Ken Carson from Project X
- hella-, an unofficial SI prefix designating 10^{27}; based on the slang term
- Hella (Master and Margarita), a vampire in a novel by Mikhail Bulgakov
- A name used for ISO 4165 plugs/sockets for automotive auxiliary power

== See also ==
- Hela (disambiguation)
- Hellas (disambiguation)
- Hello (disambiguation)
