= Frikandel =

Deep fried meat snack

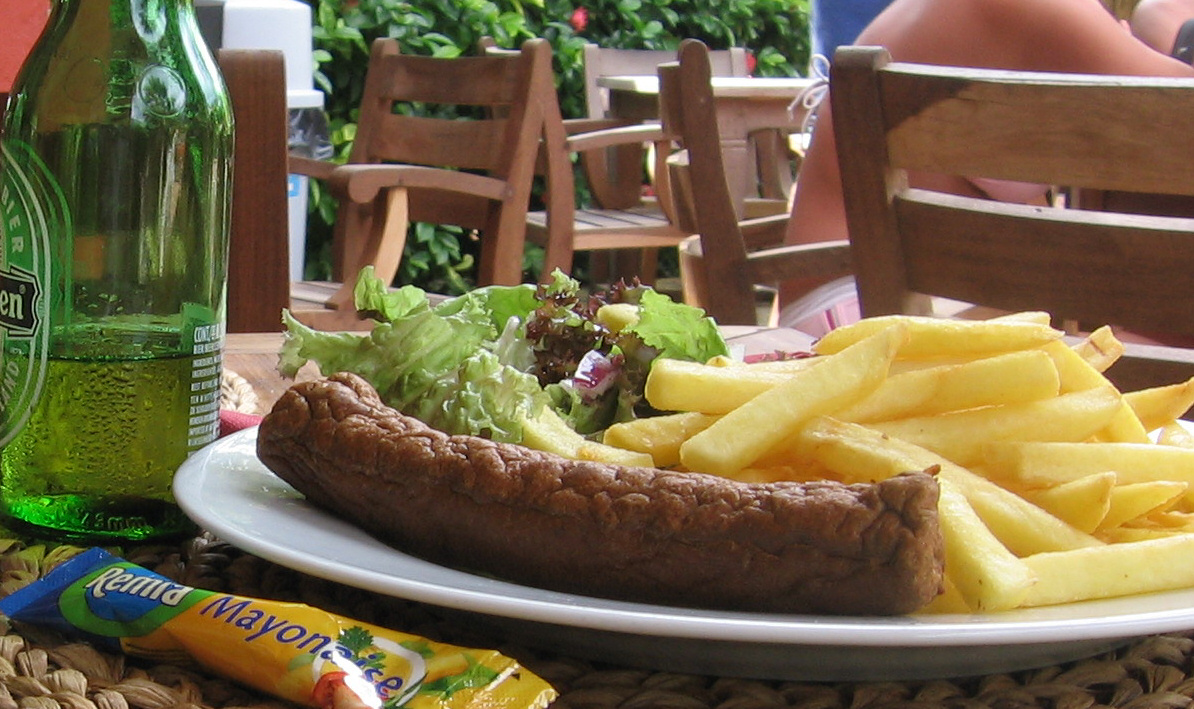
A frikandel with fries, lettuce and mayonnaise

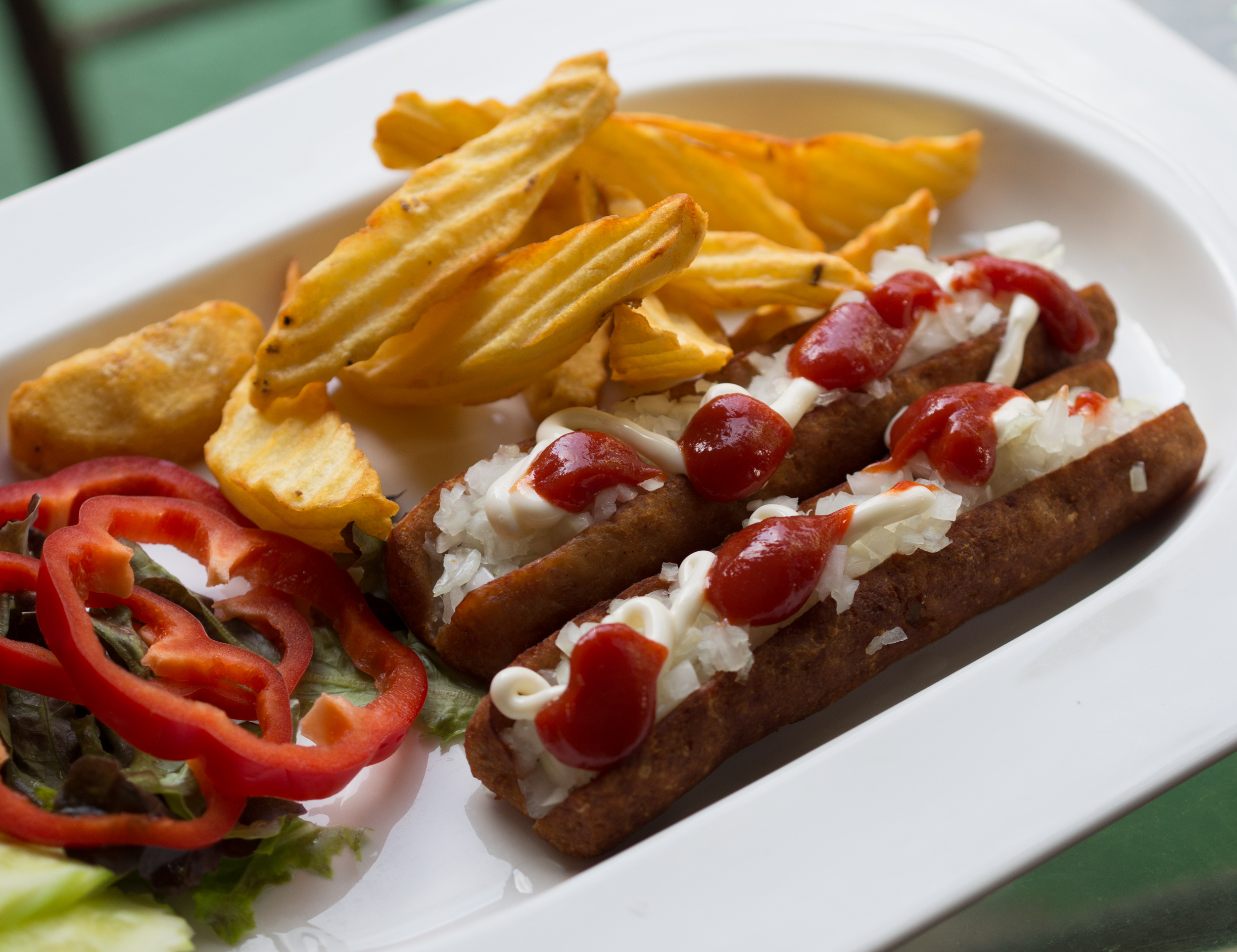
Home-made frikandel speciaal with fries

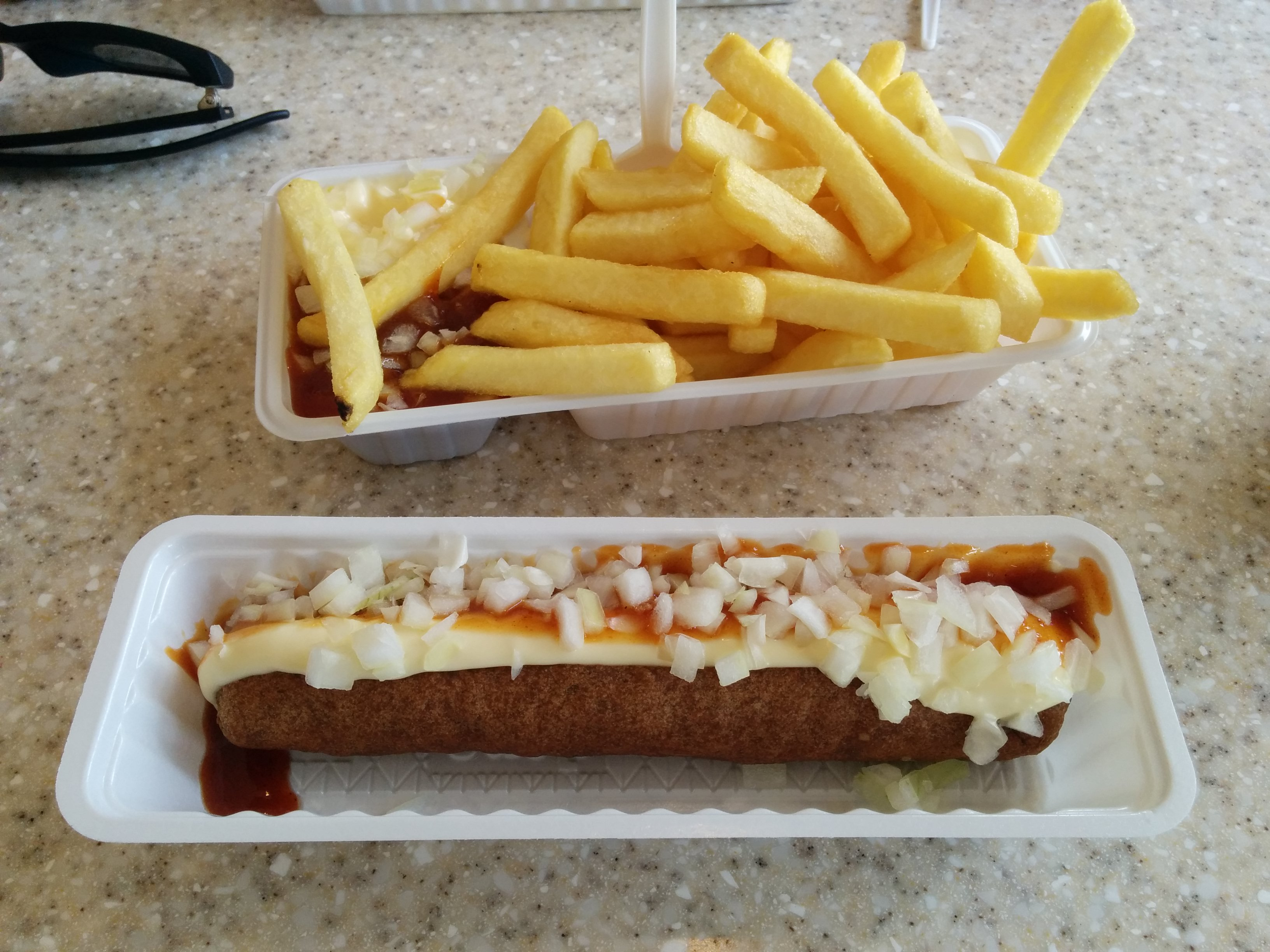
Friet speciaal and frikandel speciaal served in a Dutch snackbar

A frikandel (Dutch pronunciation: [frikɑnˈdɛl]. Plural frikandellen) is a traditional snack originating from the Netherlands. It is a sort of minced-meat sausage, of which the modern version was developed after World War II. The history of this snack in the Spanish Netherlands goes back to the 17th century.

== History ==
Unlike the modern frikandel, the historical frikandel (frickedil) is made from minced veal and generally spiced with mace, nutmeg, salt, pepper and optionally orange peel. A version without egg and breadcrumbs was cooked in a veal net.

The shape of the frikandel could have been phallic on purpose. The writer P.C. Hooft called 'fricadellen' a recipe for old spinsters. Also, a special version of the frikandel was served to pregnant women, according to 18th-century cookery books. It was a veal meatball containing an egg yolk, hidden and sewn into a small leaf of lettuce.

There is some confusion around whether frikandel should be written with or without an "n", but in essence, the frikandel and the frikadel are two different products. Until 2005 however, only "frikadel", was seen as the official spelling. After 2005, "frikandel" was accepted as well.

The difference between a "frikandel" and a "frikadel" is that the frikadel was invented in 1954 and the frikandel is a similar product invented in 1958 and has a different production method, yielding a smoother end-product. Currently, the frikadel is no longer in production.

== Description ==
The modern frikandel is a cylindrical chewy, skinless, dark-coloured sausage-like meat product which is usually eaten warm. Unlike most sausages, the frikandel is deep-fried. In Belgium and in the north of France (Nord-Pas-de-Calais), it is called a "frikadel", "fricandelle" or "fricadelle". In some parts of Flanders (Belgium), notably around Antwerp, it is called "curryworst" (not to be confused with the German currywurst, though in eastern Germany people tend to make currywurst from skinless sausage). In the U.S., a product inspired by the frikandel although not identical is marketed under the "Dutch Dawg" and "Freakandel" brands.

In Belgium, frikadel means (also raw) minced pork; it seldom contains other meat. Where the sausage is called "curryworst", the term frikadel is often used to describe a sort of meatball (the precursor of the frikandel, with the same meat), commonly eaten in Belgium, Germany and Denmark.

Who created the modern frikandel is contested. Some claimed it was first made by Gerrit de Vries in Dordrecht in 1954 when a law prevented him from selling his product as a meatball. He changed the name and shape instead of the recipe. Others say it was created by Jan Bekkers in Deurne in 1958, and named by him "frikandel" after he founded the Beckers factory the following year.

However, the present recipe with very fine mince is derived from Bekker's 1958 version. The De Vries 1954 sausage, named fricadelle, contained chunkier minced meat and essentially was a minced meat patty shaped like a sausage.

In the Netherlands, northern France, Belgium, Aruba and Curaçao, the frikandel consists of a mixture of mechanically separated meat, including chicken (40% or more) and pork (about 25%). In the US, it contains pork (50%), beef (35%) and non-mechanically separated chicken (15%). Some manufacturers also add in a bit of horse meat. A halal version exists and contains only chicken and beef. Other ingredients are bread crumbs, thickener, herbs and spices, onion and flavour enhancers.

== Popularity ==
It is the most popular fast food snack in the Netherlands, followed by kroket. According to the AKSV (the General Association of Manufacturers of Cooking Supplies and Snacks in the Netherlands), 600 million frikandellen are produced each year in the Netherlands. Most of these are also sold in the Netherlands, where more than 37 frikandellen are consumed per capita per year.

== Serving ==
In the Netherlands, it is most often served with curry ketchup, mayonnaise or fritessaus, though some eat it with tomato ketchup, mustard or apple sauce. A frikandel speciaal is very popular: a frikandel served with mayonnaise or fritessaus, curry ketchup or regular tomato ketchup and chopped raw onion. The frikandel speciaal usually has a deep cut lengthwise through the middle to provide room for the chopped onions and the sauce. Some people prefer the taste of a frikandel if the cut is made before frying, resulting in a larger crisp surface. Sometimes the frikandel is served on a bun and is then called a broodje frikandel.

In Belgium and in the north of France, it is served with any sauce of choice and sold in a variety of ways, such as with onions, in a long bun, a piece of baguette, as a kebab or plain and untouched.

== Variants ==
Frikandellen can also be included in party-packs together with other Dutch snacks such as bitterballen, although they are significantly reduced in length. They are also often available in holiday resorts abroad which are popular with the Dutch, such as Lloret de Mar, Spain.

In the Netherlands, frikandel-eating contests are regularly held all over the country. The record for most frikandellen consumed in one hour was set in 2005 by Sjonnie Noordeinde of Delft, consuming 47 sausages of 80 grams each.

The Belgian company Vanreusel created a number of variants of the frikandel such as the Frikandel XXL (a larger variant of the frikandel) in 2010 and the loempidel (a frikandel wrapped in a lumpia coat) in 2019.

In many other countries, including South Africa, Denmark and Germany, frikadel or Frikadelle (not to be confused with frikandel) is the local name of minced-meat meatballs or patties like those used in hamburgers. The Indonesian perkedel shares the same name and origin, but the primary ingredient is mashed potato.

== See also ==
- List of sausages
