= Hela =

Hela may refer to:

== Ethnography ==
- Hela (people), a name for the Sinhala people of Sri Lanka
- Hela (caste), a Hindu caste found in North India
  - Hela Mehtar, Muslim members of this caste
- Hela language, or Elu

== Fiction and mythology ==
- Hela (Blake), daughter of Tiriel in a poem by William Blake
- Hel (being), Queen of Hel and daughter of Loki in Norse mythology
- Hela (character), Asgardian goddess from the Marvel Universe

== Places ==
- Hela Province, a new province being formed from 4 districts of Southern Highlands Province of Papua New Guinea
- Hela, the German name for Hel, Poland
- 699 Hela, an asteroid

== Other uses ==
- HeLa, a line of cells derived from deceased American cancer patient Henrietta Lacks, notable for being the first immortalised cell line
- SMS Hela, a light cruiser of the Imperial German Navy
- Hela Gewürzwerk Hermann Laue, German spice and ketchup brand
- Ȟéla, native Lakota name of Kyrie Irving
- Hela, an open-world adventure video game developed by Windup Games
