= Hella =

American slang meaning "very" or "a lot"

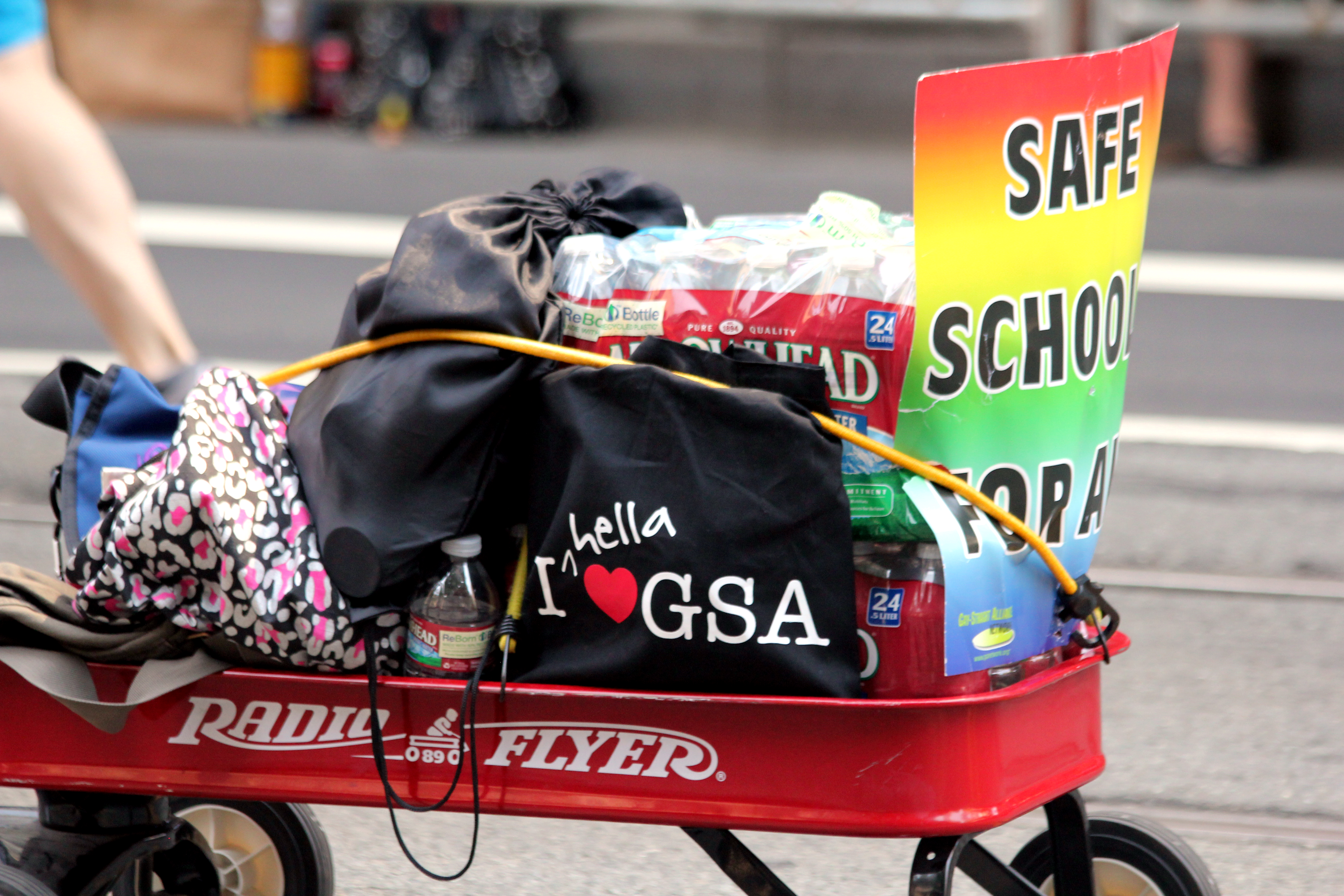
'Hella' as used in Northern California

Hella is an American English slang term originating in and often associated with San Francisco's East Bay area in Northern California, possibly specifically emerging in the 1970s African-American vernacular of Oakland. It is used as an intensifying adverb such as in "hella bad" or "hella good". It was eventually added to the Oxford English Dictionary in 2002, citing a 1987 first use in the Toronto Star. It is possibly a contraction of the phrase "hell of a" or "hell of a lot [of]", in turn reduced to "hell of", though some scholars doubt this etymology since its grammatical usage does not align with those phrases; or of "hellacious". It often appears in place of the words "really", "a lot", "totally", "very", and in some cases, "yes". Whereas hell of a is generally used with a noun, according to linguist Pamela Munro, hella is primarily used to modify an adjective such as "good".

According to lexicographer Allan A. Metcalf, the word is a marker of northern California dialect. According to Colleen Cotter, "Southern Californians know the term ... but rarely use it." Sometimes the term grippa is used to mock "NorCal" dialect, with the actual meaning being the opposite of hella.

== History ==
=== Early use ===
Hella has likely existed in northern California English since at least the mid-1970s. Geoff Nunberg, a UC Berkeley linguist, has theorized on the origins of the slang term "hella". "Hella emerged somewhere in Northern California around the late 1970s, and although it spread to other places, it’s still associated with this region," says Nunberg. Historically, many slang words have spread from black English to white English and not in the other direction, which is why Nunberg says he suspects it started in Oakland, an area that, at one point, was 47% African American.

By 1993, Mary Bucholtz, a linguist at the University of California, Santa Barbara, collated materials from an urban high school (Mt. Eden High School) in the Bay Area and found that hella was "used among Bay Area youth of all racial, ethnic, and socio-economic backgrounds and both genders." Hella remains part of the dialect of northern California, where it has grown in popularity.

=== Spread ===
By 1997, the word had spread to hip hop culture, though it remained a primarily West Coast term. With the release of the 2001 No Doubt song "Hella Good," one Virginian transplant in California "fear[ed] the worst: nationwide acceptance of this wretched term." Since the early 1990s hella has been used regularly in the Pacific Northwest as a common slang term, particularly in Seattle and Portland, Oregon. Popular area rappers Blue Scholars and Macklemore regularly use the term in their lyrics; Macklemore uses the word several times in his worldwide hit song "Thrift Shop".

In the South Park episode "Spookyfish," which was the 1998 Halloween special, the character Cartman repeatedly used the term hella to the annoyance of the other characters, which contributed to its currency spreading nationally. "You guys are hella stupid" is one of the phrases spoken by a talking Cartman doll released in 2006. The Sacramento–based band Hella chose its name for the regional association; Zach Hill says "It's everywhere up here.... We thought it was funny, and everyone says it all the time."

Hella was included on the BBC's list of 20 words that sum up the 2000–2009 decade, defined as "An intensive in Youthspeak, generally substituting for the word very".

Paralleling the use of the minced oath heck, some people use hecka in place of hella. Younger school children may be required to use this form. Church culture in Northern California also encouraged usage of hecka over hella.

The Prince song "U Got The Look", released in 1987 on the album Sign o' the Times, features the lyric "your body's hecka slammin'...", which would appear to be an early adoption of the term hecka in its accepted vernacular usage.

== Usage ==
=== Intensifier ===
While intensifiers similar to hella exist in many colloquial varieties, hella is uncommonly flexible. It can be used to modify almost any part of speech, as shown below:

- That pizza was hella good: hella modifies the adjective good, where Standard American English would use very.
- Chris's pizza is hella better than anyone else's: hella modifies the adjective better, replacing much.
- I ate hella pizza: hella modifies the noun pizza, replacing a lot of.
- I ran to the pizza joint hella quickly: hella modifies the adverb quickly, replacing very.
- Was the party fun last night? -- Hella!: hella is used on its own as a reply replacing very or totally.

=== SI prefix ===
An online petition begun in 2010 by Austin Sendek of Yreka, California, seeks to establish "hella-" as the SI prefix for 10^{27}. The prefix was recognized by Google in May 2010, and Wolfram Alpha in May 2011. In 2013, Andrew McAfee suggested the term hellabyte with this usage. In 2022, the International Bureau of Weights and Measures adopted the prefix "ronna-" to represent 10^{27}, as the symbol H, commonly used to represent "hella-", is already in use in the metric system for the Henry, a unit of inductance.

== See also ==
- Skookum, a similar word used in the Pacific Northwest, from the Chinook Jargon
- Jawn, a similar word used in Philadelphia
- Hella (disambiguation)
