= Schultüte =

Kind of bag that is delivered in Germany to students on the first day of school

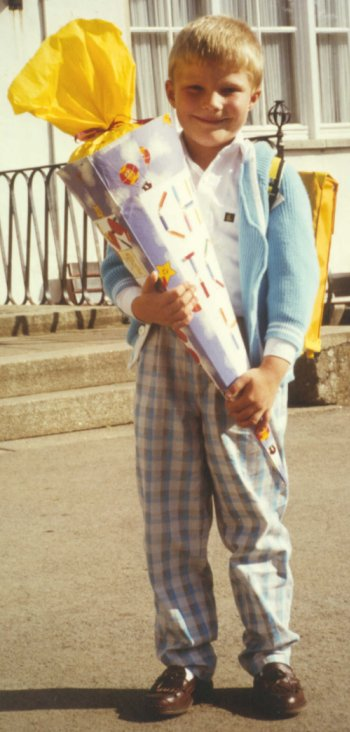
Boy holding a Schultüte

A Schultüte (German pronunciation: [ˈʃuːlˌtyːtə], "school cone"), also known as a Zuckertüte (German pronunciation: [ˈtsʊkɐˌtyːtə], "sugar cone") in some parts of Germany, is a large cone-shaped, cornucopia-styled container made of paper, cardboard, or plastic.

When children in Germany, Austria, German-speaking parts of Switzerland and Belgium, parts of the Czech Republic close to the German border, and parts of Poland (Greater Poland, Upper Silesia, Warmia), set off for their first day of school upon entering first grade, their parents and/or grandparents present them with this large cone, attractively decorated and filled with toys, chocolate, candies/sweets, school supplies, and various other special treats. The cone is given to children to make this anxiously awaited first day of school a little sweeter.

== History ==
The name translates as cone, even though the German word "Tüte" is translated into English in most other contexts as "bag".

The tradition of the Schultüte has its origins in approximately the year 1810 in Saxony, Saxony-Anhalt, and Thuringia in Germany. The first documented report of cone-shaped Schultüten comes from the city of Jena in 1817, closely followed by reports from Dresden (1820) and Leipzig (1836). It started in the larger cities but spread quickly to small towns and villages, soon becoming an institution all over Germany.

In the early days of the concept of the Schultüte, before it spread to other parts of Germany, the usual routine was not to hand over the Tüte to the children personally. Marked with the students' names, the Zuckertüten were taken to the school by grandparents or godparents and in a ritual reminiscent of the Mexican piñata, they were hung on a metal Schultüten-Baum (school-cone tree) from which each child had to pick his or her cone, without breaking it. The story told to the children claimed that there was a Schultüten-Baum growing at the school, and if that tree's fruits (i.e. the Schultüten) were ripe and large enough to pick, it was then time to go to school for the first time.

The only custom that changed in the latter half of the 20th century is that fewer sweets seem to appear in the Schultüte, with more practical gifts such as crayons and pencils, small toys, CDs, books and even articles of clothing replacing the traditional chocolates and candies/sweets. These are traditionally given by grandparents who also take the child out to dinner the evening before school begins.

If they are not made by the parents, the Zuckertüten can be bought from shops ready-made or they are made by the children themselves in the kindergarten.

Christiane Cantauw, a German folklore expert at the Volkskundliche Kommission für Westfalen (Folkloristic Commission of Westphalia, based in the city of Münster), has researched the Schultüte tradition. In a 2016 interview with the broadcaster Deutsche Welle she explained how important the symbolism of the Schultüte tradition is for school beginners and their families, regardless of their financial means:

The school cone is really just a container, which means you can't look inside of it. And it's not opened at school but afterwards at home. That means that if I'm financially not in a position to fill up the cone with presents, I can fill it out with extras. So people threw in potatoes or paper. In one instance, I read that a wooden shoe was put in the bottom of the cone. But we can see that this symbol for school beginners was so important that no one wanted to do without it.

— Christiane Cantauw

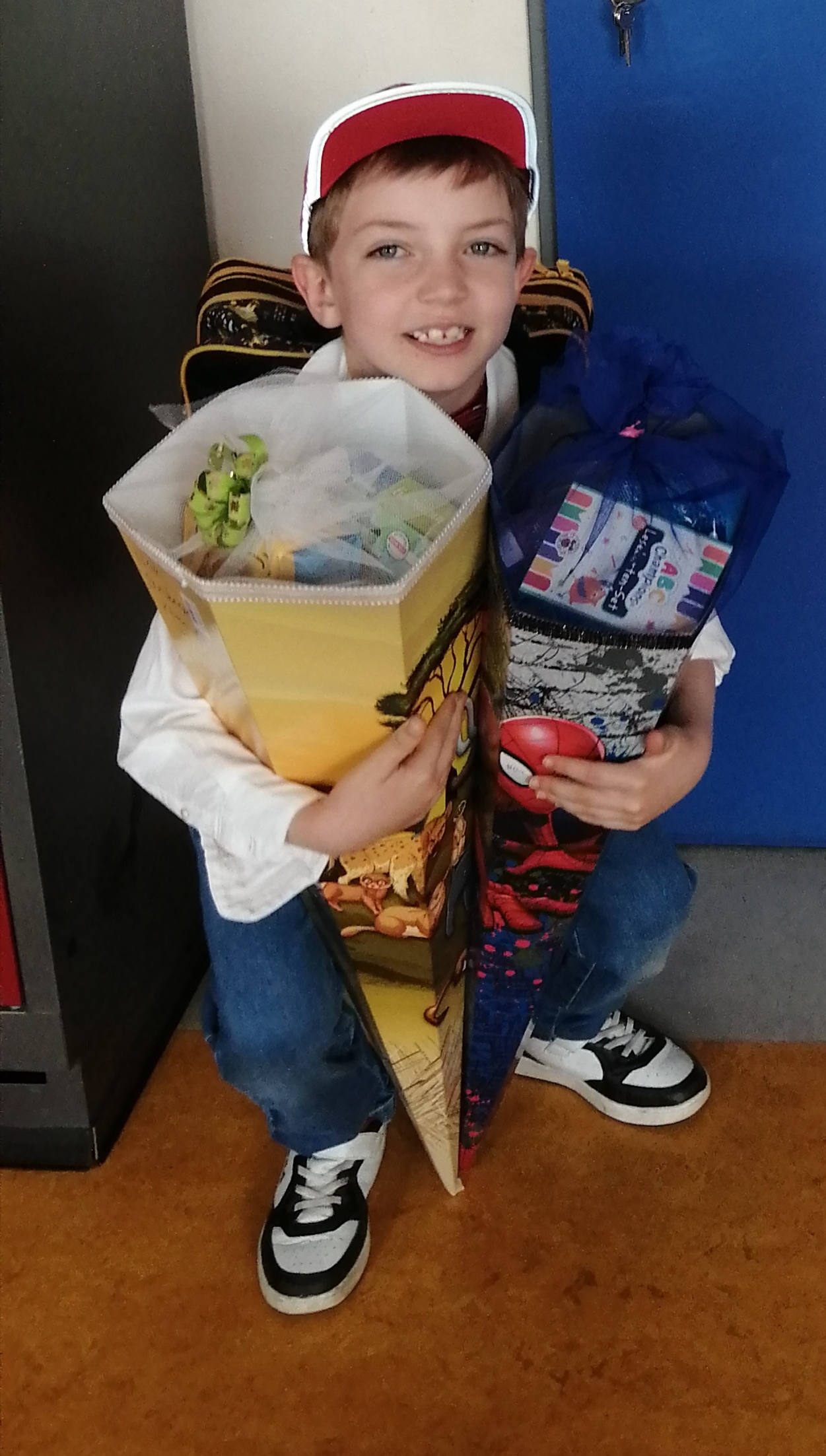
Child with two Zuckertüten decorated with Spider-Man motifs in 2024

== Shapes ==
After the division of Germany, hexagonal school cones with a length of 85 cm were established in East Germany, while the traditional round cones (usually 70 cm long) were preferred in the West.

== Commercial production ==
The largest manufacturer of Zuckertüten in Germany is Nestler Feinkartonagen GmbH in Ehrenfriedersdorf. It produces more than two million Schultüten per year.

== Gallery ==
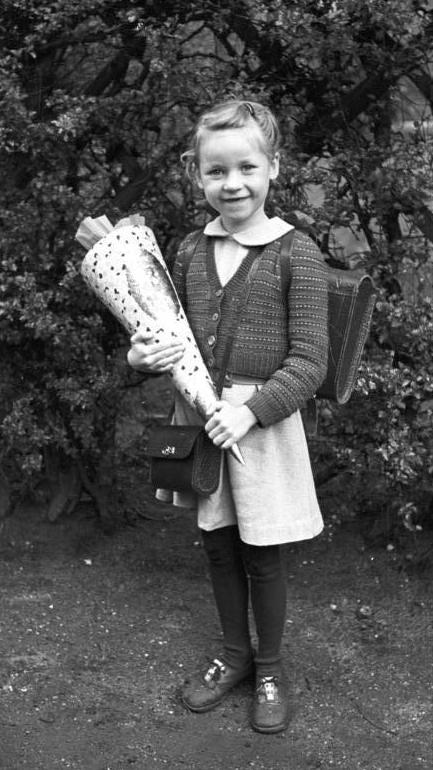
Girl with a Schultüte, 1953

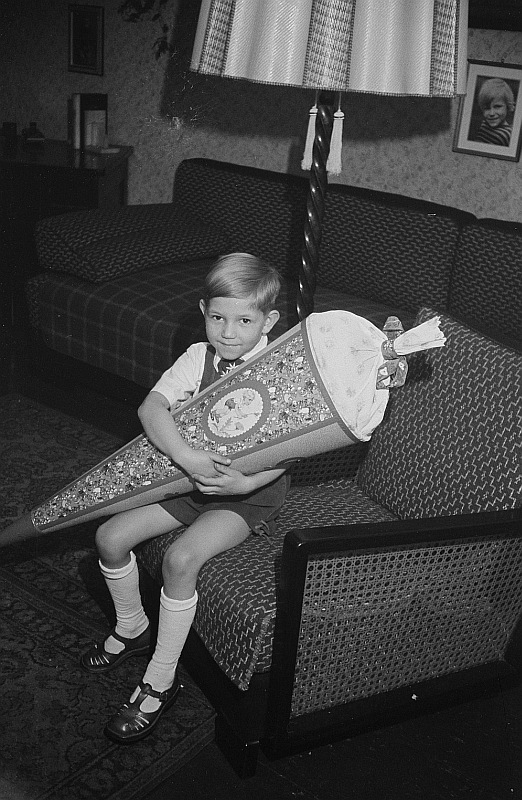
Boy with a Schultüte in Leipzig, 1951

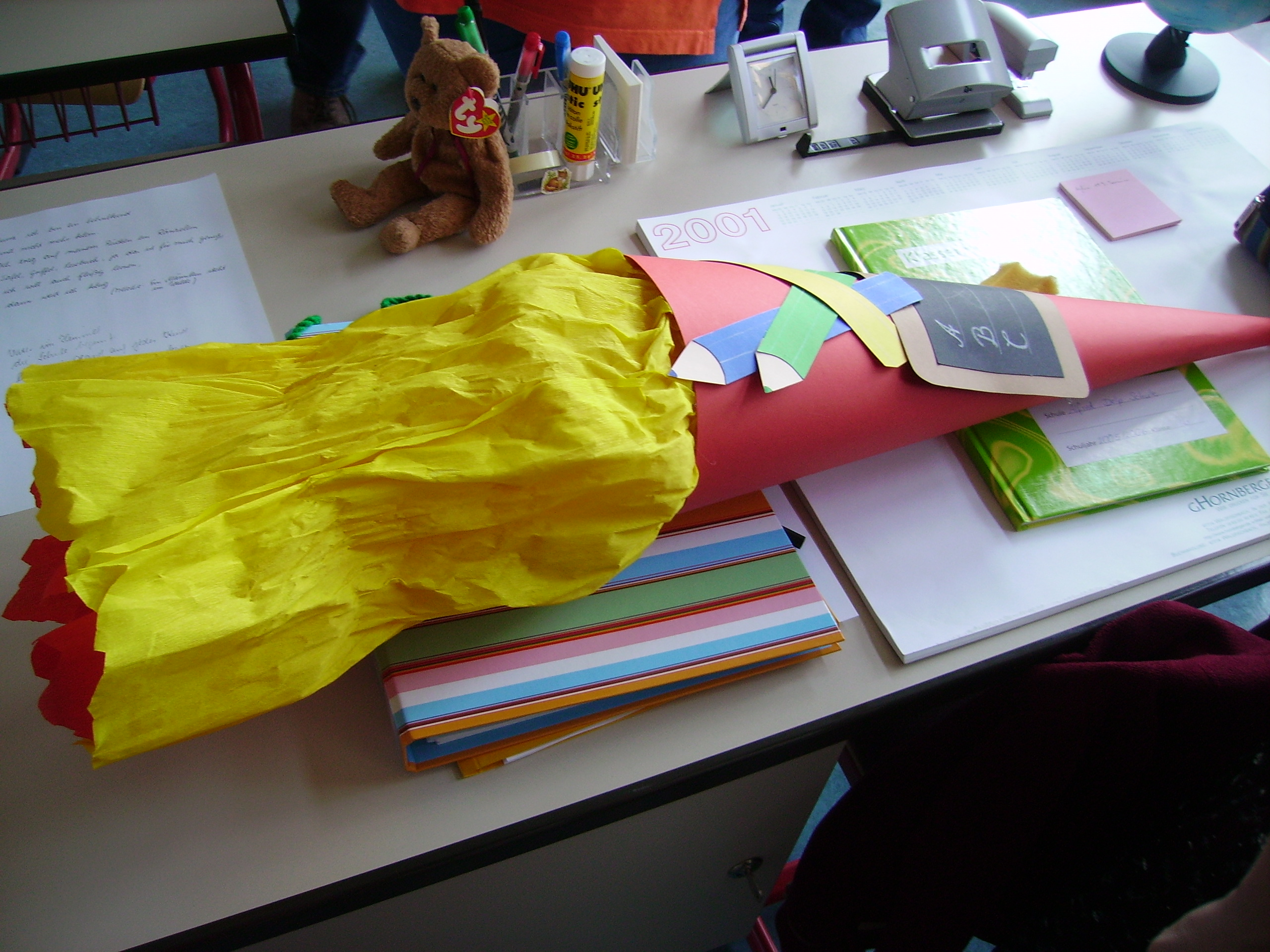
An unpacked Schultüte

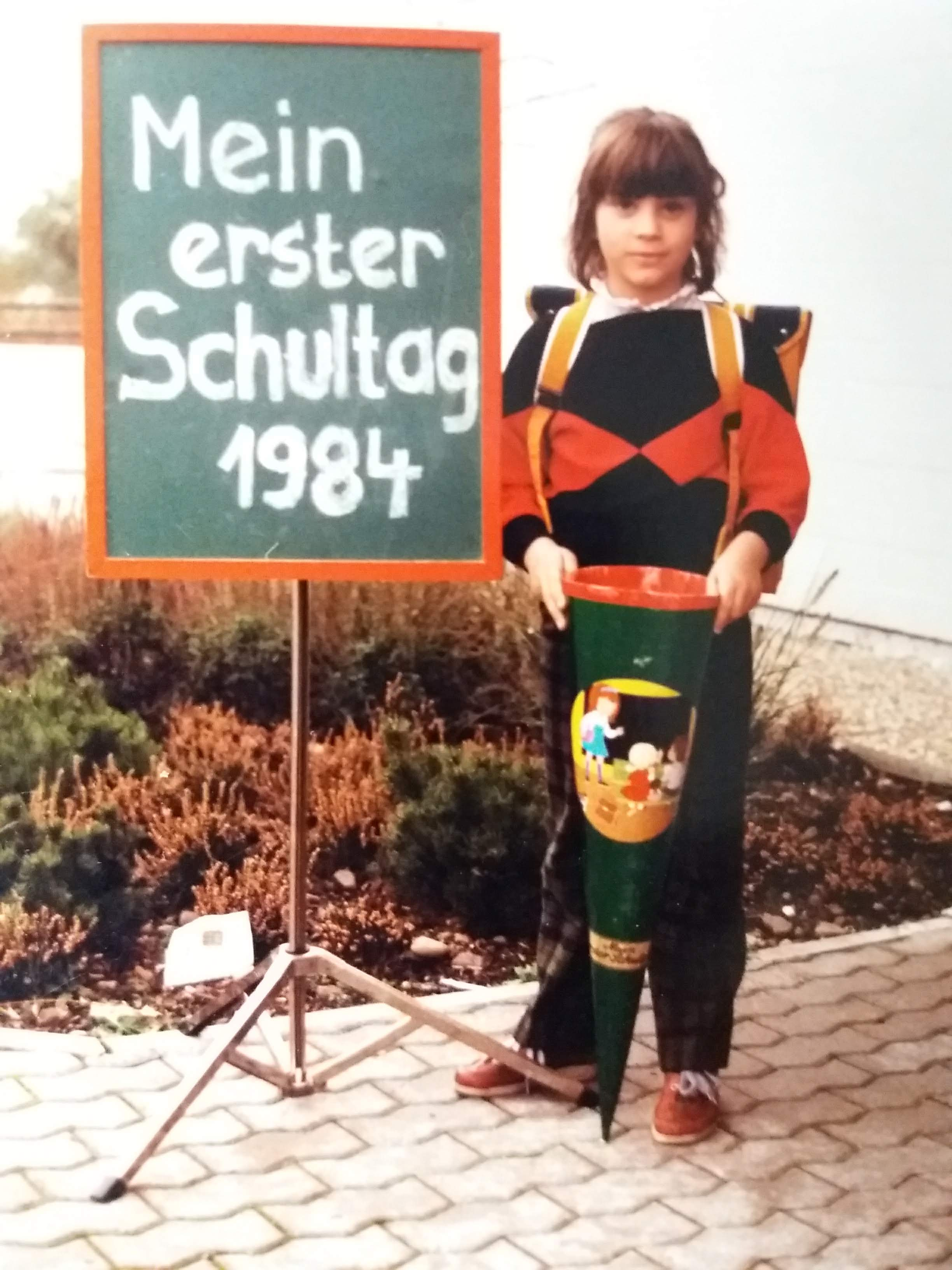
Girl with Schultüte, Germany, 1984
