= Hela Gewürzwerk Hermann Laue =

German food company

- Type: GmbH
- Industry: Spices
- Predecessor: Carl H. Rose & Co.
- Founded: 24 May 1905
- Founder: Otto Hermann Laue
- Headquarters: Ahrensburg, Germany
- Number of locations: 8 (total)
- Products: Spiced ketchup, Spice mixes
- Number of employees: ~700 (2025)
- Website: www.hela.eu/

The Hela Gewürzwerk Hermann Laue is a manufacturer of spice mixes, spiced ketchup, and spiced sauces. The company is primarily known for its spiced ketchup, particularly the curry ketchup, which is a popular stable of modern German cuisine, particularly in grilling.

== History ==
The company was preceded by the drugstore and spice trader Carl H. Rose & Co. founded on 24 June 1893 by Carl Heinrich Rose in the district of Barmbek in Hamburg. Otto Hermann Laue was hired as an apprentice and, on 25 November 1904, elevated to representative (Prokurist) of the company. On 13 May 1905, Laue took over the company and changed its name to Hermann Laue (later abbreviated to Hela; Hermann Laue) on 16 August 1906; later that year, the company would get its first logo. In 1928, the store was transferred from the Bachstraße 155 in Barmbek to the Kampstraße 22 in the Schanzenviertel. After World War II, the company started to modernize itself through the acquisition of machines and the pivot to the manufacturing of spice mixes rather than just the sale of regular imported spices. By 1951, the company had 17 employees. In 1960, the company started to produce small spice packets for airlines. In 1963, the company started producing spiced ketchup. The company's seat was moved from Hamburg to Ahrensburg between 1989 and 1991.

Starting in 1976, the company expanded internationally: first to Austria, then Switzerland (1976), Singapore (1978), Canada (1980), France (1987), China (1995/2004), and Chile (2000). Factories later also opened in Australia and Brazil; Hela also bought a stake in the Dutch company Thissen in which would later become its Dutch branch under the name Hela Thissen. The current branches are located in: Germany, the Netherlands, Canada, Brazil, Chile, China, Singapore, and Australia.

As of 2025, the company has around 500 employees at its main location in Ahrensburg and around 700 employees globally.

== Products ==
Hela is primarily known for its over 25 different variants of spiced ketchup, particularly the curry ketchup, but the company also sells over 4,000 different spice mixes and over 8,000 products in total. Additionally, the company hosts an online merchandise shop where it sells stuffed toys, clothing, and decorations based on its ketchup bottle designs.
