= Curry ketchup =

Sauce with curry powder

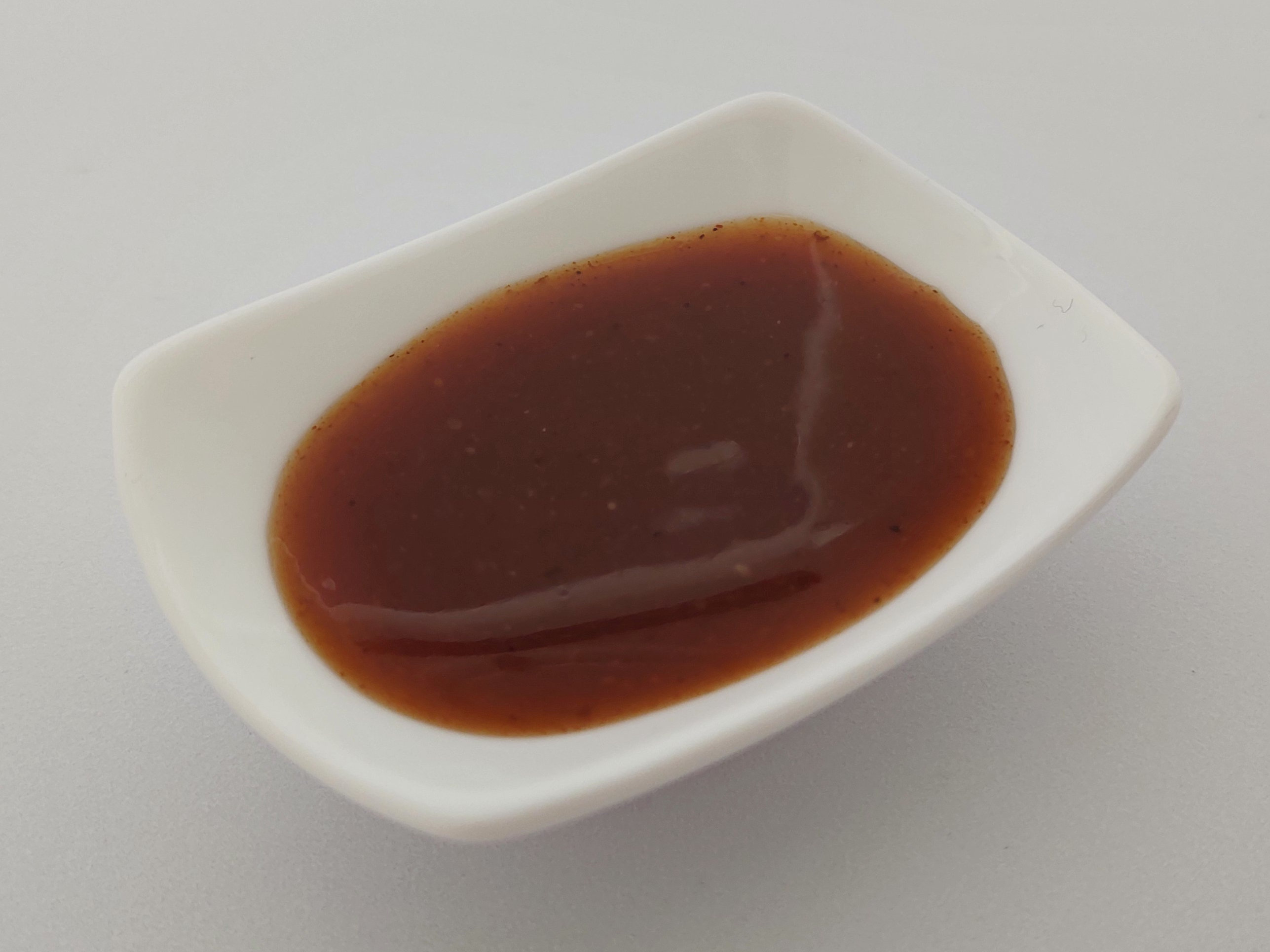
- Type: Ketchup
- Place of origin: Belgium, Germany, the Netherlands, Scandinavia
- Main ingredients: Tomato paste, curry powder

Curry ketchup is a spiced variant of tomato ketchup and a common condiment in Belgium, Germany, the Netherlands and Scandinavia.

It is typically served on prepared meats such as a frikandel, or on French fries. In Germany, it is sometimes used as a simple alternative to curry sauce, a sauce used for the dish currywurst, one of the most popular in the country. Typically with currywurst, additional curry powder is sprinkled on top of the curry ketchup.

Major brands producing curry ketchup include Zeisner, Heinz, Hela, Oliehoorn, and Knorr.
