= Fritessaus =

Dutch condiment, usually served with French fries

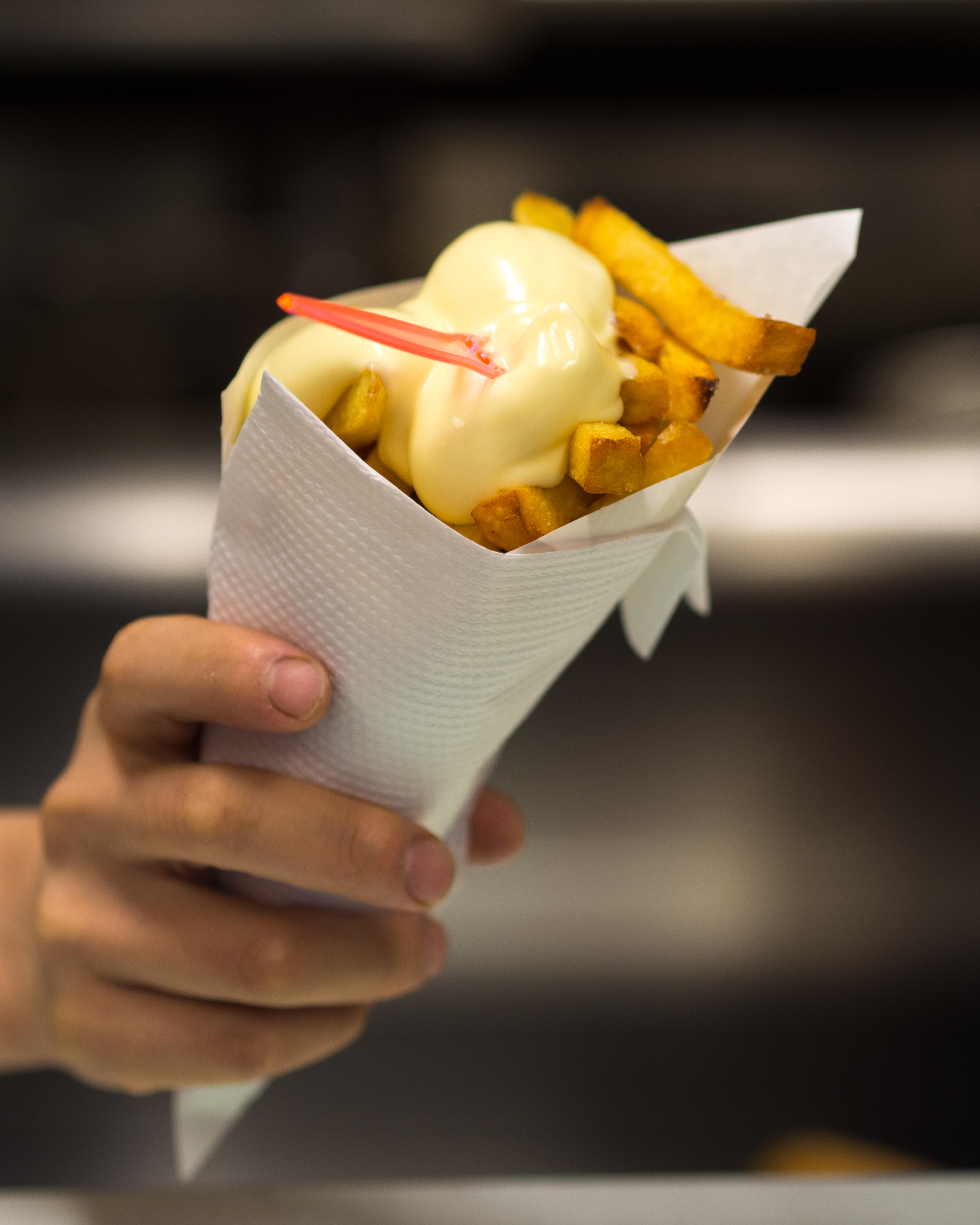
- French fries with fritessaus
- Alternative names: Frietsaus
- Type: Sauce
- Place of origin: Netherlands
- Serving temperature: Cold

Fritessaus or frietsaus ("fries sauce") is a Dutch accompaniment to French fries, popular in the Netherlands. It is similar to mayonnaise, but with at most 25% fat, is leaner and usually sweeter than mayonnaise as it has added sugar and lower requirements for fat percentage than mayonnaise. The Dutch Warenwet (Commodities Act) of 1998, specifically within the Warenwetbesluit Gereserveerde aanduidingen (Article 4), mandates that for a product to be labeled as "mayonnaise" in the Netherlands, it must contain a minimum of 70% fat and at least 5% egg yolk.

== See also ==
- List of dips
- List of sauces
