= Adler 2 Liter =

Adler 2-litre
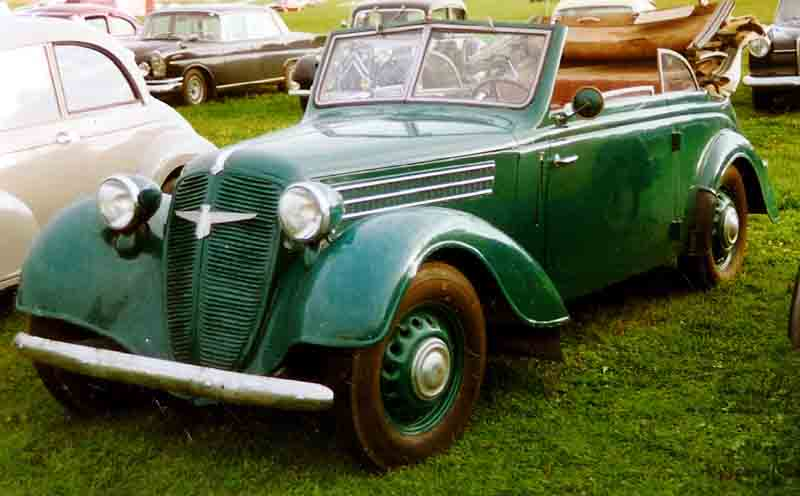
- Adler 2-litre cabriolet (1939)

Overview
- Manufacturer: Adlerwerke
- Production: 1938–40: 7,470 units
- Assembly: Frankfurt am Main

Body and chassis
- Body style: “Limousine” (4 door Saloons); 2 door Cabriolets
- Layout: FF layout

Powertrain
- Engine: 1,910 cc 4 cylinder in-line side-valve engine
- Transmission: 4-speed manual. No synchromesh.

Dimensions
- Wheelbase: 2,920 mm (115.0 in)
- Length: 4,540 mm (178.7 in)
- Width: 1,600 mm (63.0 in)
- Height: 1,580 mm (62.2 in)

Chronology
- Predecessor: Adler Trumpf

The Adler 2-litre is a medium-sized family car introduced by the Frankfurt based auto-maker, Adler in February 1938, as a replacement for the Adler Trumpf.

== Engine ==
The car came with a 4-cylinder 1,910 cc engine for which maximum power output of 45 PS (33 kW; 44 hp) at 3,900 rpm was claimed. Top speed was given as 110 km/h (68 mph). The engine was in many respects no more than a bored-out version of the existing 1,645 cc unit which had been used since 1936 in the Trumpf.

Transmission of power to the front wheels was via a 4-speed manual transmission without synchromesh. Gear changing used a column-mounted lever.

== Bodies ==
Three standard all-steel bodies were provided in 1938 by Ambi-Budd of Berlin. Customers could choose between a four-door “Limousine” (saloon/sedan), a cabriolet with four side windows, or a more sporting cabriolet with only limited space for anyone prepared to sit in the back. The bodies sat on a 2,920 mm (115 in) wheelbase, and had an overall body length of 4,540 mm (179 in). The manufacturer's recommended price was 4,350 Marks for the sedan/saloon and 4,950 for the less expensive of the two cabriolet bodied cars.

There was in addition a sleek more modern looking body from Karmann of Osnabrueck for the “Limousine” which continued to be produced after 1939 when the Ambi-Budd bodies disappeared. From 1939 cabriolet bodies, broadly similar to the Ambi-Budd cabriolet bodies, were provided by Frankfurt based coachbuilders Dörr & Schreck.

== Commercial ==
The Adler 2-litre continued in production from 1938 until 1940, by which year 7,470 had been produced, a respectable total when compared to the better remembered BMW 326 of which 4,705 were produced in 1938 and 3,313 in 1939, although since the BMW had been in production since 1936 its total production volume was much greater than that of the Adler 2-litre.
