= Adler 2.5-litre =

Adler 2.5 litre
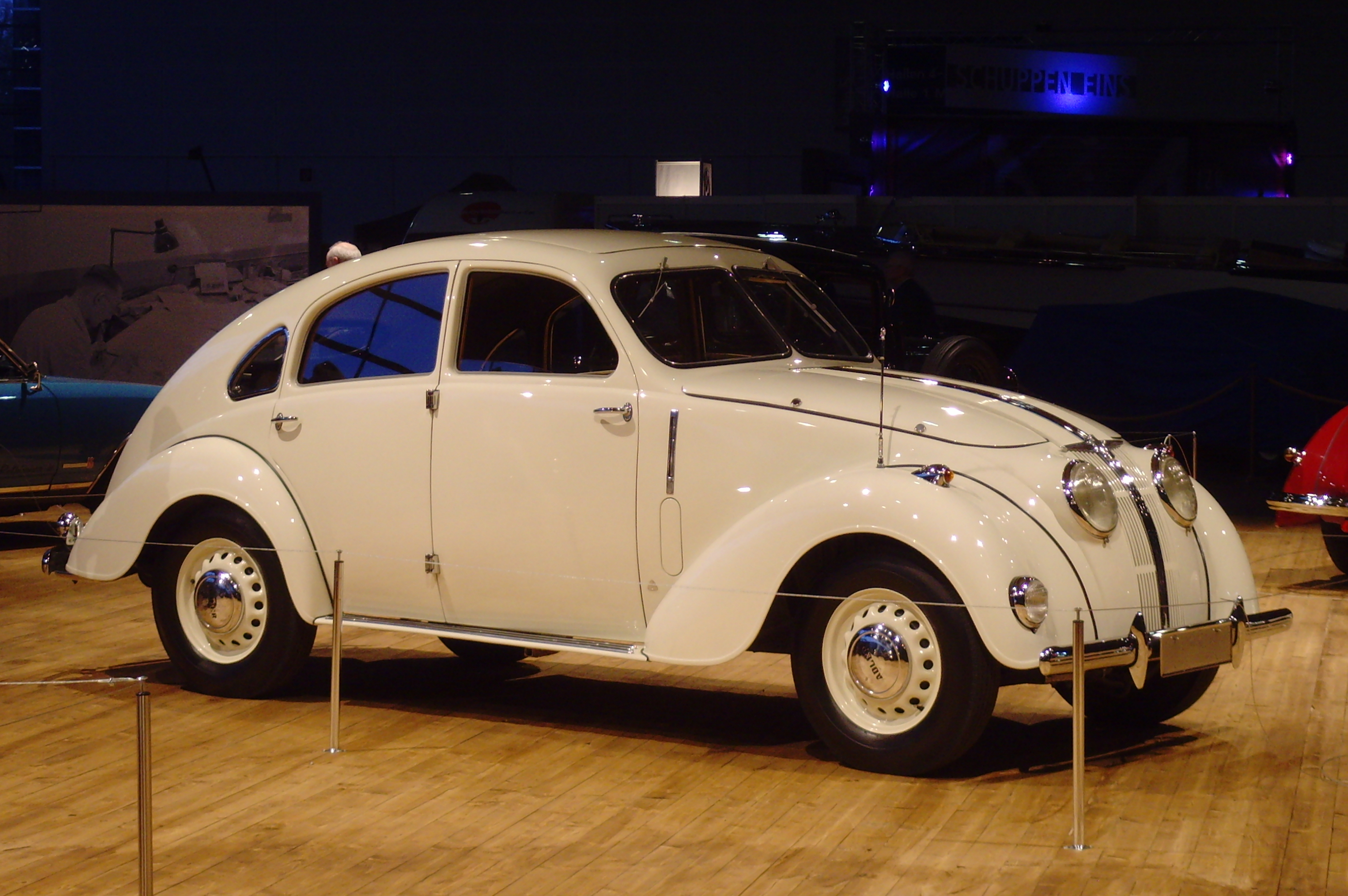

Overview
- Manufacturer: Adlerwerke
- Also called: Adler Typ 10; Autobahn Adler
- Production: 1937 – 1940; 5,295 units
- Assembly: Frankfurt am Main
- Designer: Karl Jenschke

Body and chassis
- Body style: “ Schiebedach Limousine” ( sloping roof saloon); Cabriolet with 2 or 4 seats Sport-Limousine (2-seater)
- Layout: FR layout

Powertrain
- Engine: 2,494 cc 6 cylinder in-line
- Transmission: 4-speed manual Synchromesh on top 3 forward ratios

Dimensions
- Wheelbase: 2,800 mm (110.2 in)
- Length: 4,635 mm (182.5 in) (saloon & cabriolets); 4,680 mm (184.3 in) (Sport-Limousine)
- Width: 1,740 mm (68.5 in)
- Height: 1,650 mm (65.0 in) (saloon & cabriolets); 1,500 mm (59.1 in) (Sport-Limousine)

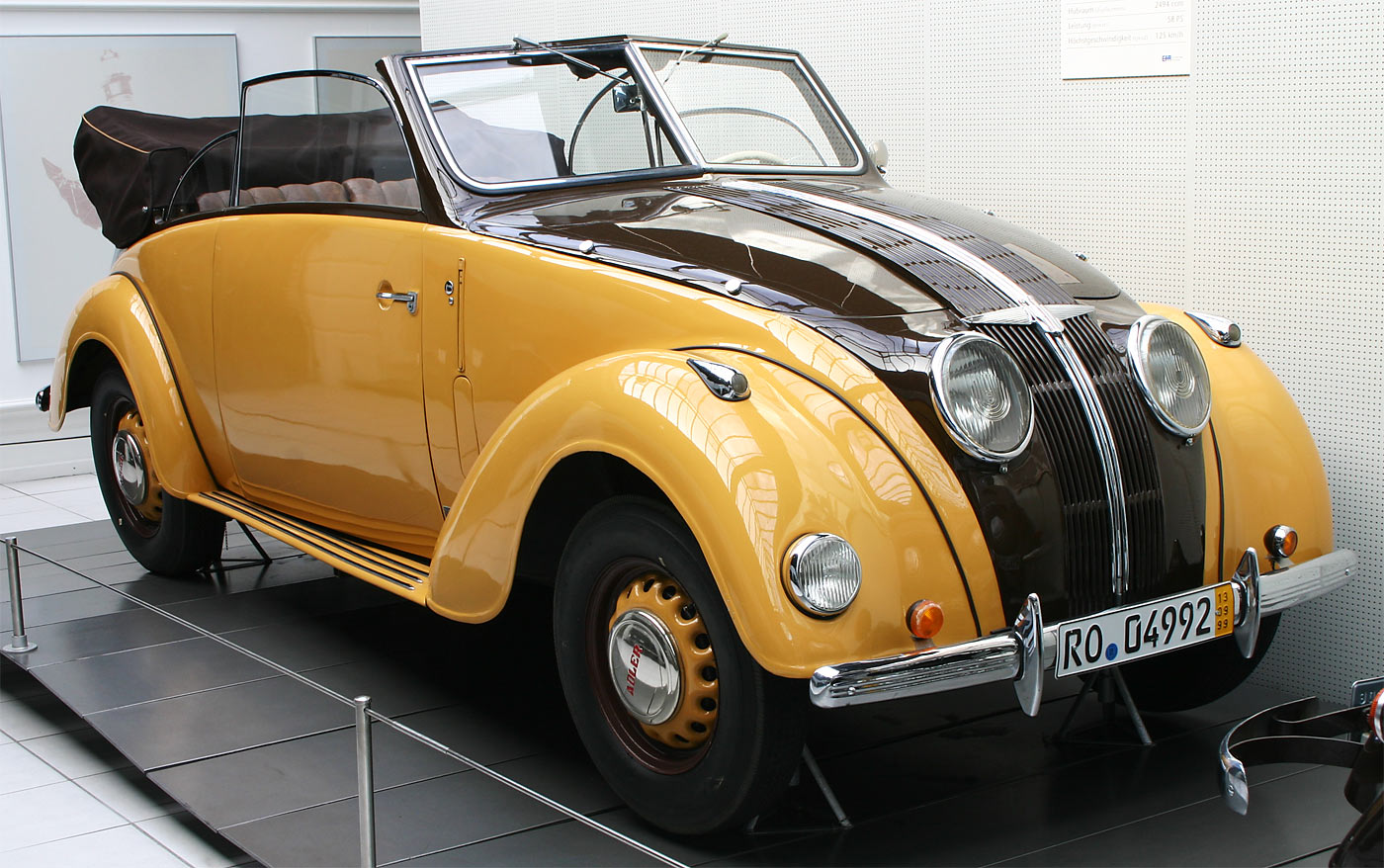
Adler 2.5-litre 2-seater cabriolet

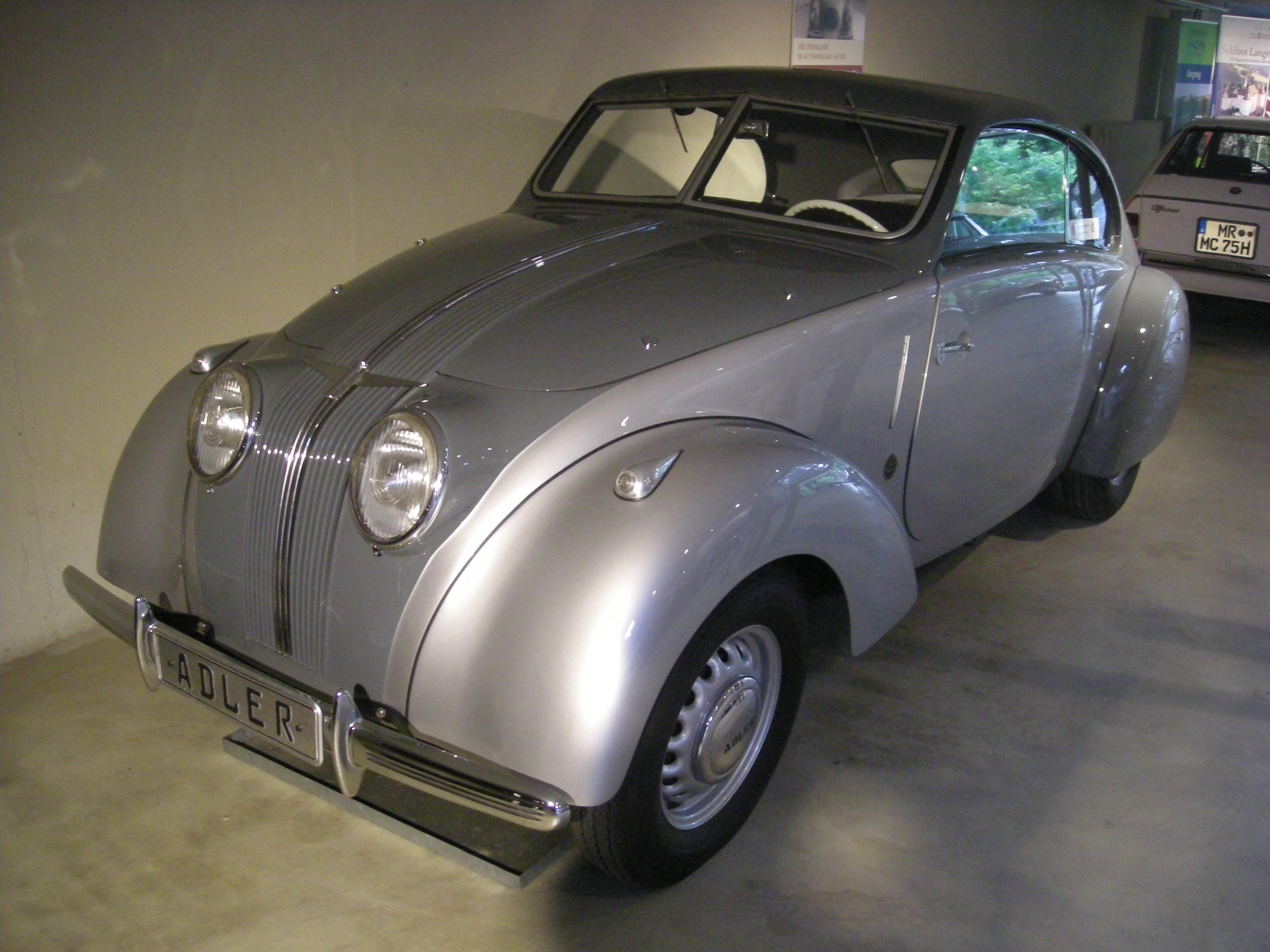
The rear wheels on the Sport-Limousine were largely covered by the bodywork (“spats”), a styling cue which in 1939 was adopted on the saloon and cabriolet models as well.

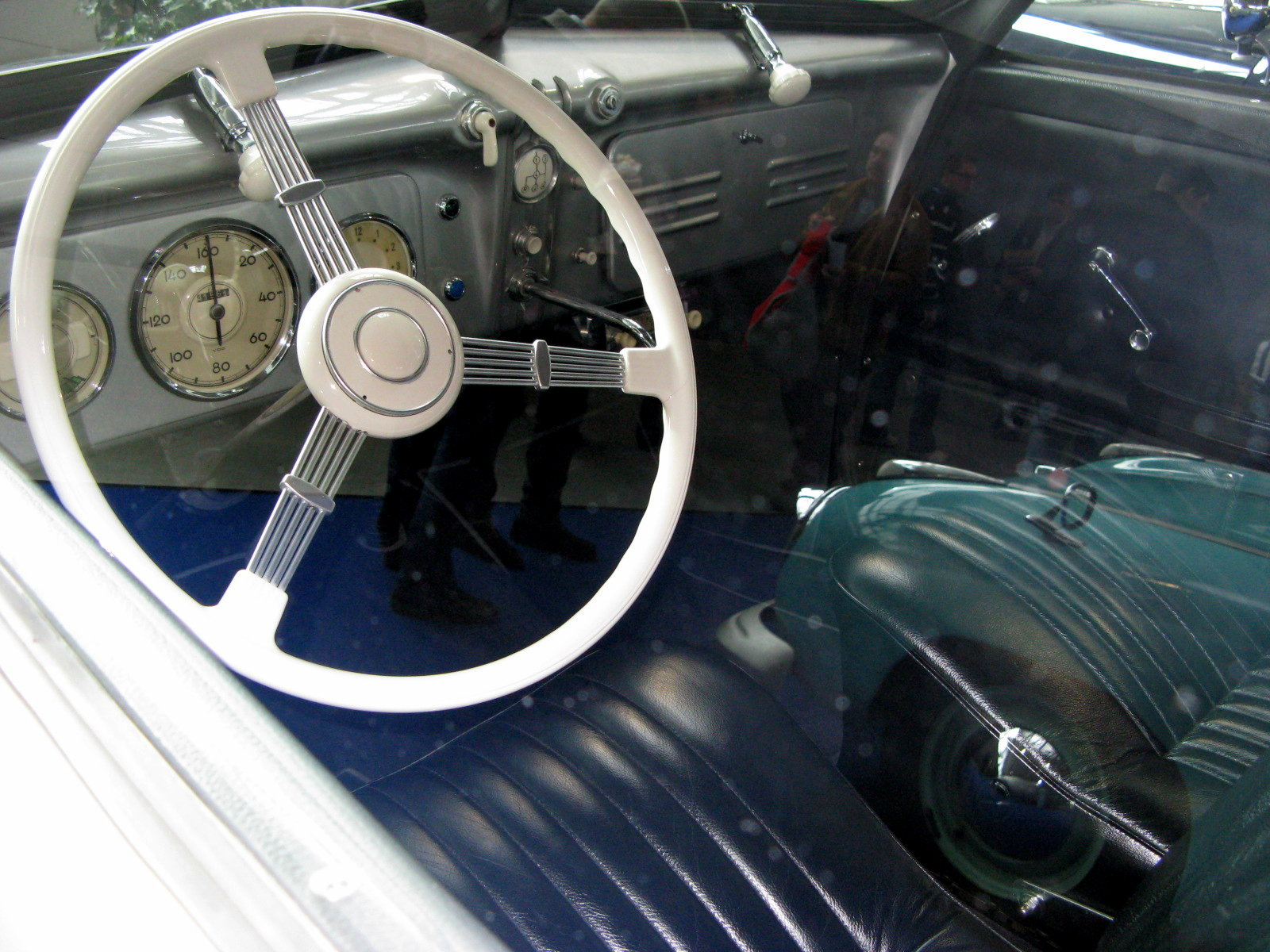
The gear lever on the Autobahn Adler, though partially hidden by the steering wheel in this picture, can here be seen sticking out from the centre of the dash board.

The Adler 2.5-litre (in German Adler 2,5 Liter) was a sensation when first presented by Adler at the Berlin Motor Show early in 1937, although this did not convert into correspondingly sensational sales.

Production got under way in November 1937. Seen as a successor for the six cylinder Adler Diplomat, it was an executive sedan/saloon featuring a strikingly streamlined body designed by Karl Jenschke (1899–1969) who till 1935 had been the Director of Engineering with Steyr-Daimler-Puch. Jenschke's last creation during his time with Steyr had been the Steyr 50 which the Adler 2.5-litre, though larger, closely resembled.

Both on account of its uncompromisingly stream-lined silhouette and because its launch coincided with Germany’s first Autobahn construction boom, the car was popularly known as the Autobahn Adler.

The body for the four-door fast back saloon came from Ambi-Budd whose Berlin based German business made the steel bodies for several of Germany’s large automakers in the decade before the war. The two- and four-door cabriolet bodies came from Karmann of Osnabrück.

== Engine and transmission ==
The Adler 2.5-litre was powered by a longitudinally installed water-cooled straight-six side-valve engine of 2,494 cc displacement, with a four-bearing crankshaft and pressured lubrication. The side valves were controlled via a chain-driven camshaft. The radiator, engine and gear box were all set well forward in the car, and power was delivered to the rear wheels via a four-speed manual transmission which included synchromesh on the top three ratios. The gear lever emerged directly from the centre of the dashboard.

== Structure and running gear ==
The load bearing aspects of the car’s structure were a welded box chassis with a floor platform. Side elements of the frame were bowed in order to provide for a roomy passenger cabin. As a result, the car was more than 100 mm (3.9 in) wider than contemporary competitors from Mercedes-Benz and BMW.

The front suspension employed wishbones and quarter-elliptical springs. The rear wheels were attached to a swing axle with a transverse leaf spring and tie rods. The differential was bolted to the frame. All four wheels used hydraulic Shock absorbers and hydraulically controlled drum brakes. The steering used a ZF manufactured Ross system

== The body ==
Welded to the frame was a four-door fast back steel body for which the drag coefficient quoted was a remarkable 0.36. The standard body came with four doors, all hinged on the B-pillar, and a huge steel sun roof panel which extended almost to the full width of the roof, and from just behind the front windscreen to half way over the rear doors. In 1939 the size of the removable roof panel was reduced in order to make it more manageable. At the front two headlights were placed close together either side of the grille, but these proved inadequate, and in 1938 a second pair of “wide beam” lights was set into the wings, although from 1938 the regulations permitted only one of these.

Other improvements in 1939 included a full size external lid for the luggage compartment in place of the minimalist opening on the original cars designed only for accessing the spare wheel, access to the rear luggage compartment having originally been achieved by leaning over the back seat from within the car, an arrangement which was still quite normal on European cars until well into the early 1950s. The rear wheels also received the “spats” (covers) in 1939, and a redesigned dashboard now incorporated much clearer instrumentation.

== Broadening the range ==
In 1938 the range was broadened with the arrival of the Adler 2.5-liter Sport, with a two-door body that from outside was clearly closely related to that of the 2.5-litre saloon, though actually the Sport was both lower and slightly longer, and thereby relatively cramped and uncomfortable. The upper part of the rear wheels was covered by the body work (properly called spats, and quickly removable for wheel changes). This body was the work of a Dresden coachbuilder called Gläser-Karosserie.

The Sport model shared its 2,494 cc 6-cylinder engine with the sedan/saloon, but in place of the standard car’s single carburetter this one came with three. The compression ratio was raised and the lower three gear ratios were mildly lowered. 80 PS (59 kW; 79 hp) of maximum power was claimed in place of the standard engine’s 58 PS (43 kW; 57 hp).

== Commercial ==
The first “Autobahn Adlers“ were delivered to customers in November 1937, priced at 5,750 Marks for the standard bodied limousine. The cabriolets were only a few hundred Marks more. The powerful Sport-Limousine came with a rather higher recommended retail price of 8,750 Marks. By way of a comparison, the market leader in this category was probably the Mercedes-Benz 230 which underwent a relaunch in the second half of 1937. In 1937 the four-door sedan/saloon version of the Mercedes came with a manufacturer's recommended retail price of 5,875 Marks, though it was possible to pay more than 9,300 Marks for a cabriolet version.

Between 1937 and 1940, when production came to an end, 5,295 of the cars were produced. By comparison, BMW produced 15,936 of their more conservatively styled but slightly smaller 326. The overall size of the German car market in the late 1930s was little more than 200,000 per year, but most of the top sellers, then as now, were small family cars produced, at that time, by the likes of Opel and DKW. Even in that context, however, the volumes achieved by the Adler 2.5-litre were less impressive than the car’s reception at the 1937 motor show might have led the manufacturer to anticipate.
