= Adler (cars and motorcycle) =

German 1900–1957 automobile and motorcycle manufacturer

- Type: Truck and Car Company
- Industry: Manufacturing
- Founded: 1880; 146 years ago
- Founder: Heinrich Kleyer
- Defunct: 1992; 34 years ago
- Headquarters: Frankfurt
- Products: Trucks cars

The logo of Adler.

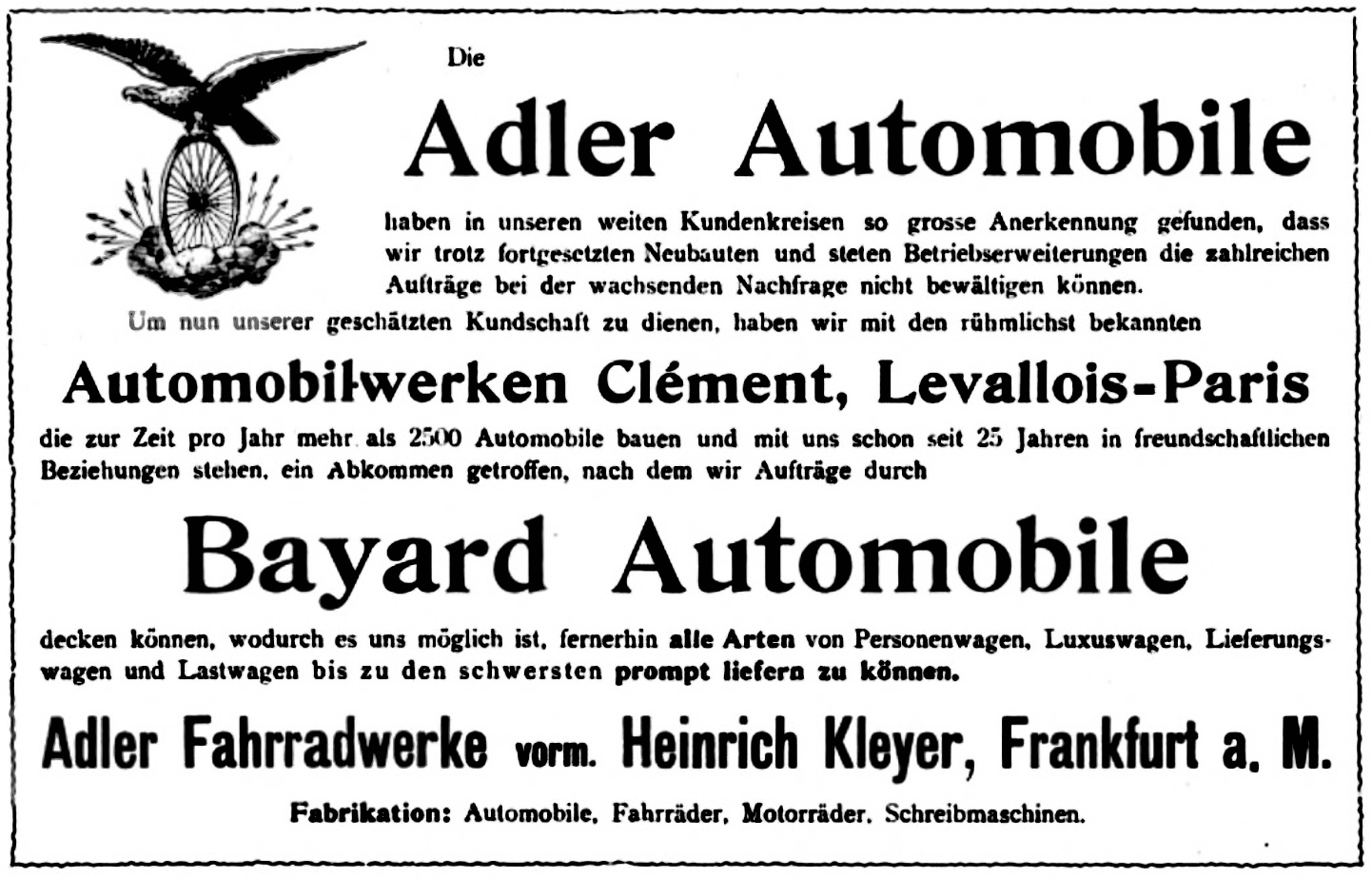
Cooperation between Adler and Clément-Bayard (1905)

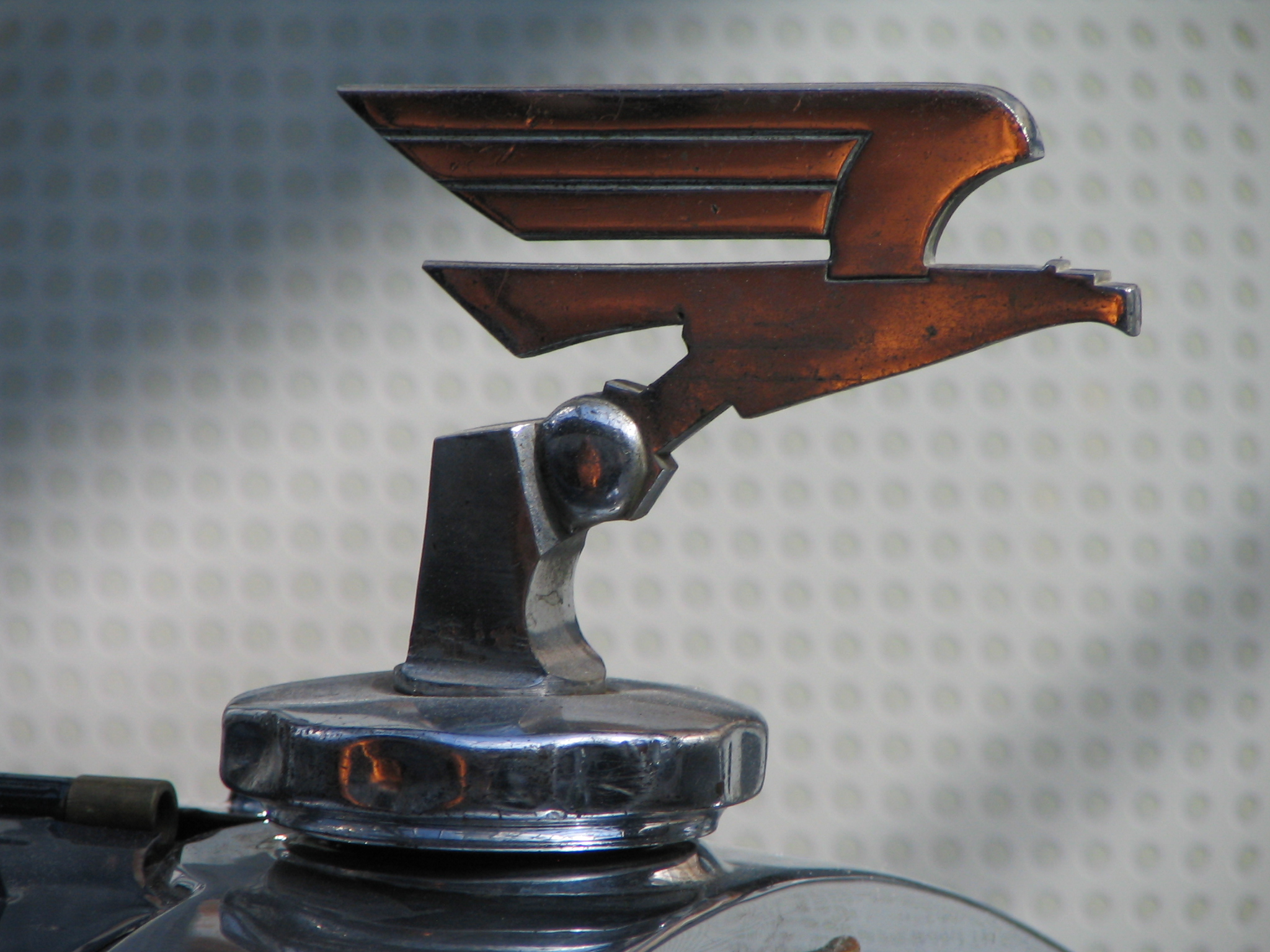
Hood ornament Adler Standard 6

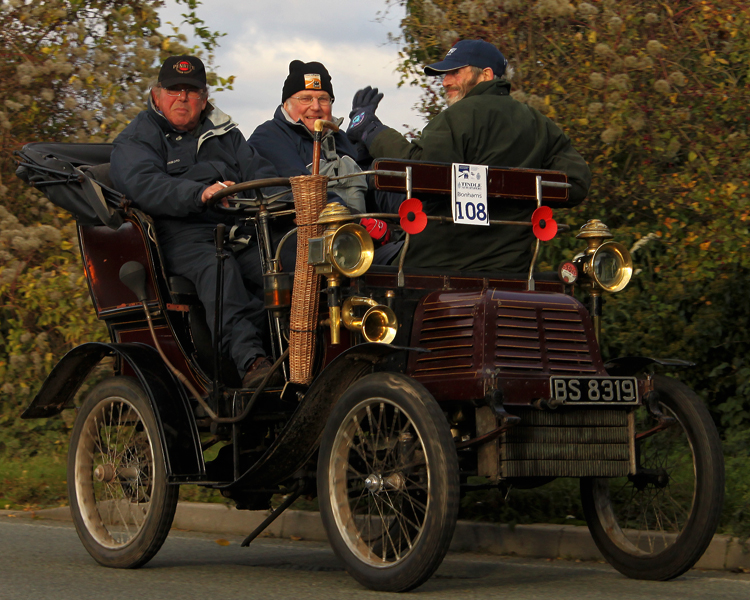
Adler 4 1/2HP Vis-à-vis 1901 entrant in the London to Brighton veteran car run 2010.

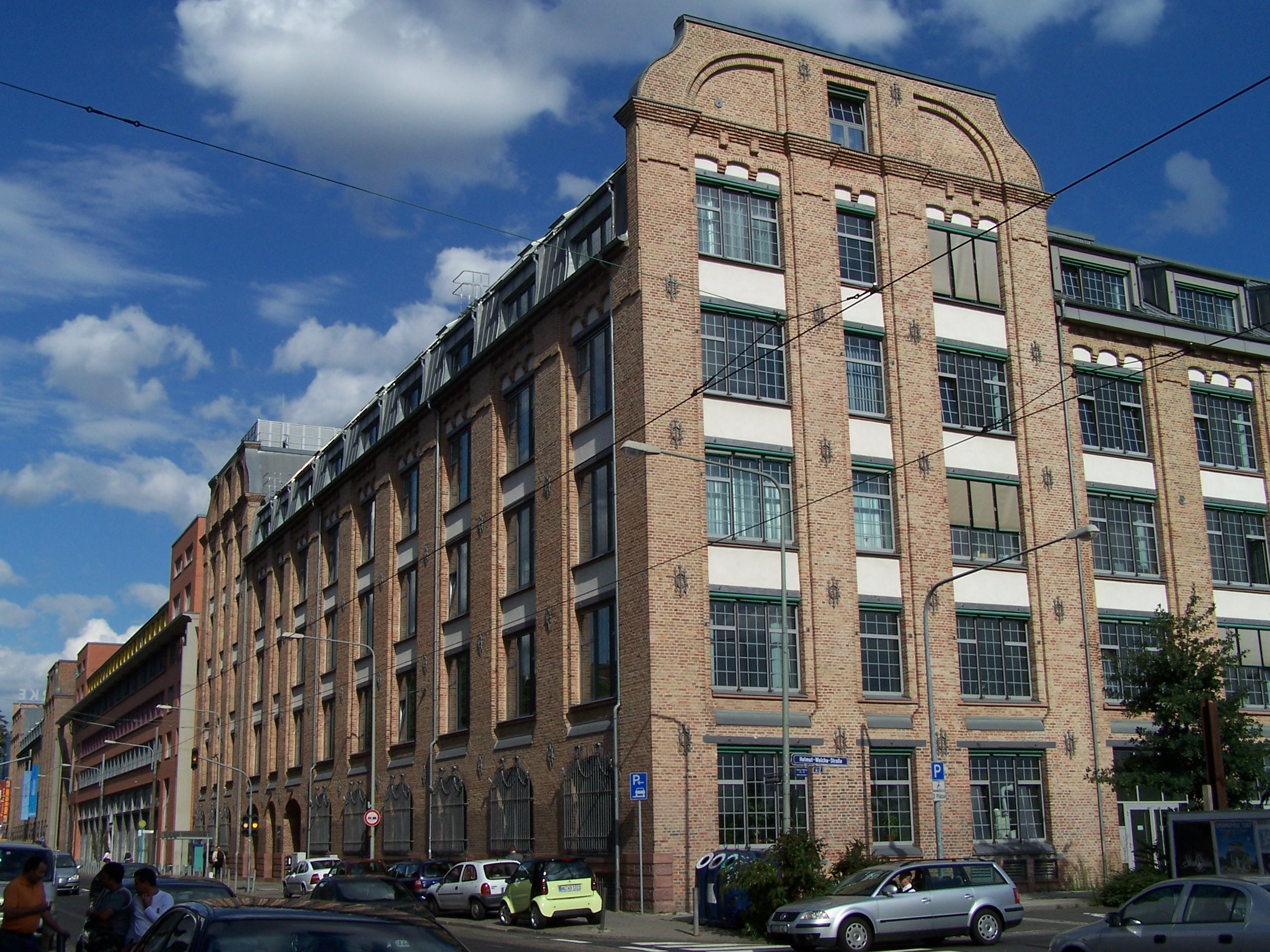
The former building of Adlerwerke in Frankfurt am Main

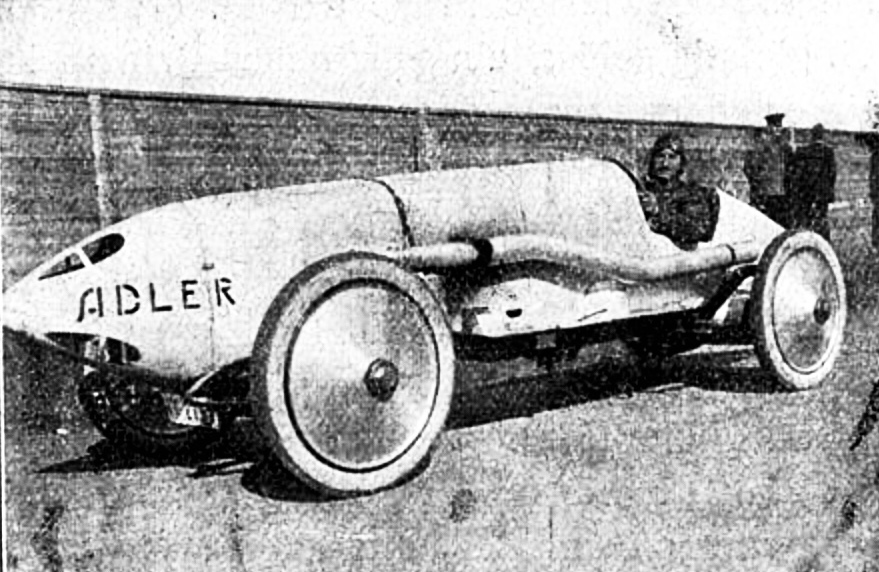
Adler Race Car (1922)

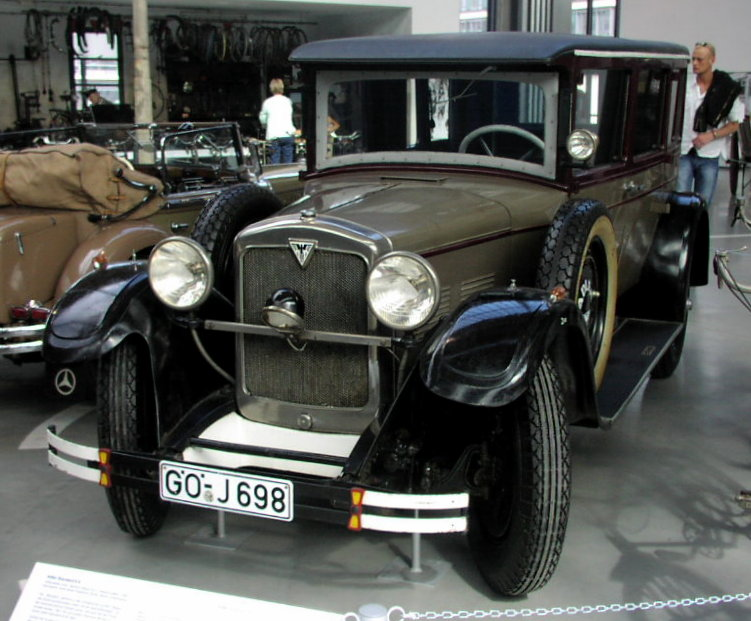
Adler Standard 6, the model Clärenore Stinnes drove on her journey around the world

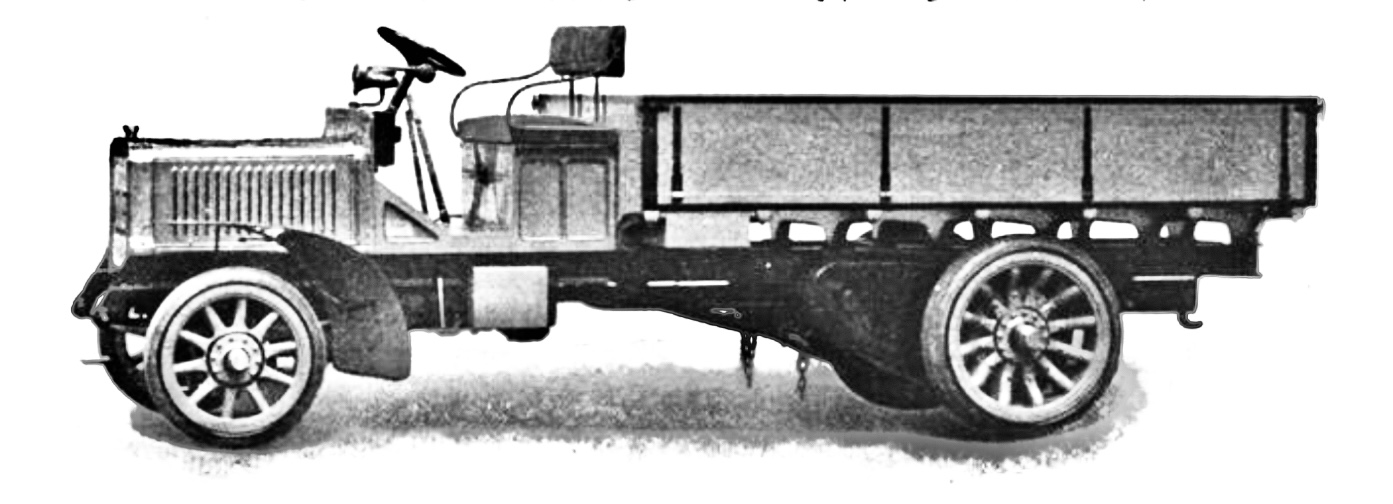
Adler 3t (1908-1909) engine 14/15 hp or, if desired, 18/20 hp

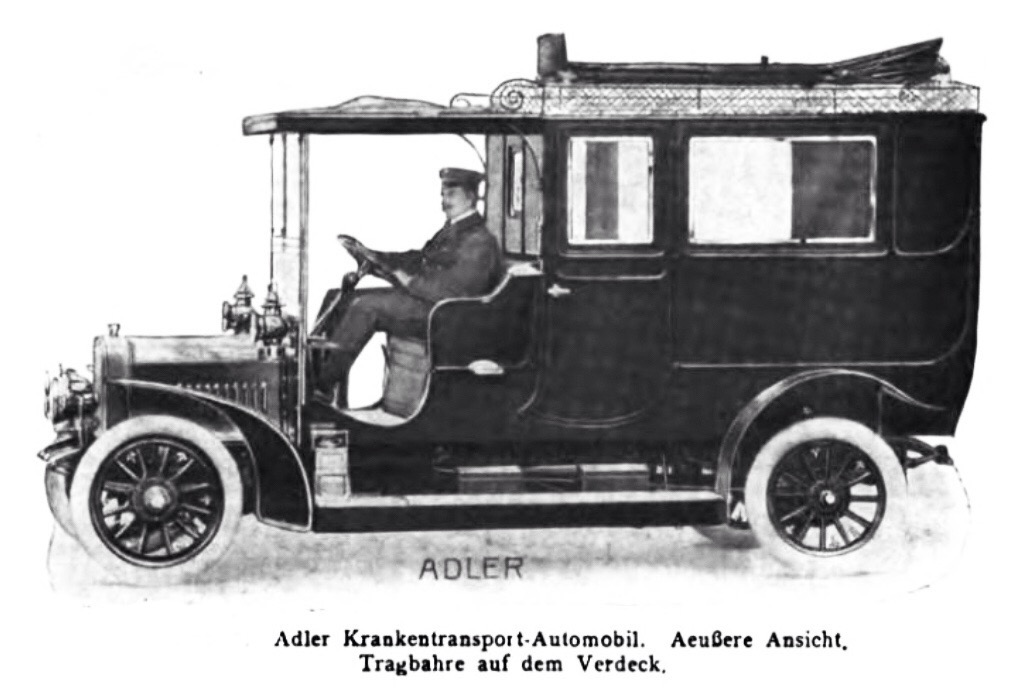
Adler ambulance 7/18 hp (1907-1910)

Adler advertisement (1908)

Adler was a German bicycle, car, and motorcycle manufacturer from 1880 until 1957. The 'Adler' name is German for 'eagle'. Adlerwerke vormals Heinrich Kleyer (‘Adler Works formerly [known as] Heinrich Kleyer’) was a German manufacturer established by Heinrich Kleyer in Frankfurt am Main.

The factory in Frankfurt-Gallus still exists and was restored in the late 1990s for use as an office building. It also houses the Gallustheater and a restaurant.

== History ==
The Adler factory produced bicycles (from 1880), typewriters, sewing machines motorcycles, aircraft and calculators in addition to cars. Before World War I, the company used De Dion two- and four-cylinder engines in cars that ranged from 1032 cc to 9081 cc; beginning in 1902 (the year Edmund Rumpler became technical director), they used their own engines as well. These cars, driven by Erwin Kleyer and Otto Kleyer (sons of the company founder Heinrich Kleyer) and by Alfred Theves won many sporting events. In the 1920s, Karl Irion raced many Adlers; popular models of the period included the 2298 cc, 1550 cc, and 4700 cc four-cylinders and the 2580 cc six-cylinders. A few of the Standard models, built between 1927 and 1934, featured Gropius-designed coachwork. The Adler Standard 6, which entered volume production in 1927, had a 2540 cc or 2916 cc six-cylinder engine, while the Adler Standard 8 which appeared a year later use a 3887 cc eight-cylinder engine. The Standard 6, first seen in public at the Berlin Motor Show in October 1926 was the first Continental European car to use Lockheed hydraulic brakes (the Triumph 13/35 offered them in the UK in 1924 and Duesenberg offered them in the US in 1920), when it was fitted with an ATE-Lockheed system. 1927 to 1929 Clärenore Stinnes was the first to circumnavigate the world by car, in an Adler Standard 6.

In December 1930, Adler assigned the German engineer Josef Ganz, who was also editor-in-chief of Motor-Kritik magazine, as a consultant engineer. In the first months of 1931, Ganz constructed a lightweight Volkswagen prototype at Adler with a tubular chassis, a mid-mounted engine, and independent wheel suspension with swing-axles at the rear. After completion in May 1931, Ganz nicknamed his new prototype Maikäfer (May Beetle). After a shift in management at Adler, further development of the Maikäfer was stopped as the company's new technical director Hans Gustav Röhr concentrated on front-wheel driven cars.

In the 1930s, the company introduced front-wheel drive Trumpf and Trumpf-Junior models, ranging from 995 cc to 1645 cc four-cylinder flat-head sv engines. These gained many successes in races, including in the Le Mans race. The 1943 cc Favorit, the 2916 cc six-cylinder Diplomat (featuring 65 hp (48 kW) at 3800 rpm, and the 1910 cc four-cylinder and 2494 cc six-cylinder models (with Ambi-Budd and Karmann bodywork) were all rear-driven; these were built until World War II. The last new car introduced by Adler was the 2.5 Liter of 1937; it had a six-cylinder engine producing 58 hp (43 kW). Thanks to a streamlined body designed by Paul Jaray, this car could run at 125 km/h (78 mph).

After World War II, a decision was made to not resume automobile construction. Motorcycle production resumed in 1949 and continued for eight years, leading to the production of the MB 250S. As part of war reparations to the Allies, Adler motorcycle designs were ceded to Britain; however it is an urban myth that the Adler designs formed the basis of Ariel's Arrow and Leader models. Increasingly, Adler focused on the manufacture of office equipment. The company associated with Triumph to form Triumph-Adler, and was taken over by Grundig in 1957, then later by Olivetti. In 1969 Adler was acquired by Litton Industries.

In 1993, Olivetti sold Adlerwerke AG, which is still listed on the stock exchange, with the entire historical factory premises in Frankfurt to real estate investor Roland Ernst and construction company Philipp Holzmann. The existing typewriter production was initially relocated and finally discontinued in 1998; the site with the listed buildings was sold separately to subsidiaries of the investors. In 1999 HBAG Real Estate (formerly Kühltransit AG) took over 98.3 percent of the shares of Adlerwerke AG from the financially troubled Philipp Holzmann AG.

Adlerwerke AG changed its name to Adler Real Estate in 2002 and have been active in real estate project development since then.

=== Car models ===
Typ	Construction Time	Cylinders	Capacity	Power	Top speed
Vis-à-Vis	1900–1903	1	400 cc	2,6 kW (3,5 PS)	30 km/h (19 mph)
45 PS (33 kW; 44 hp)	1900–1903	1	510 cc	3,3 kW (4,5 PS)	35 km/h (22 mph)
8 PS (6 kW; 8 hp)	1901–1903	1	865 cc	5,9 kW (8 PS)	40 km/h (25 mph)
24/28 PS	1904–1905	4 inline	4,016 cc	20,6 kW (28 PS)	65 km/h (40 mph)
8/12 (8/14) PS	1904–1906	2 inline	2,008 cc	8,8–10,3 kW (12–14 PS)	50 km/h (31 mph)
4/8 PS	1906–1907	2 V	1,032 cc	5,9 kW (8 PS)	55 km/h (34 mph)
5/9 PS	1907–1909	2 inline	1,134 cc	6,6 kW (9 PS)	60 km/h (37 mph)
8/15 PS	1907–1910	4 inline	2,011 cc	11 kW (15 PS)	55 km/h (34 mph)
11/18 PS	1907–1910	4 inline	2,799 cc	13,2 kW (18 PS)	55 km/h (34 mph)
23/50 PS	1909–1912	4 inline	5,800 cc	42,6 kW (58 PS)	
19/45 PS	1909–1912	4 inline	4,840 cc	35 kW (48 PS)	
13/30 PS	1909–1912	4 inline	3,180 cc	25,7 kW (35 PS)	
10/28 PS	1909–1912	4 inline	2,612 cc	22 kW (30 PS)	
K 7/15 PS	1910–1913	4 inline	1,768 cc	11 kW (15 PS)	60 km/h (37 mph)
30/70 PS	1911–1914	4 inline	7,853 cc	51 kW (70 PS)	115 km/h (71 mph)
35/80 PS	1911–1914	4 inline	9,081 cc	62,5 kW (85 PS)	
K 5/13 PS	1911–1920	4 inline	1,292 cc	9,6–10,3 kW (13–14 PS)	55 km/h (34 mph)
20/50 PS	1912–1914	4 inline	5,229 cc	40 kW (55 PS)	105 km/h (65 mph)
15/40 PS	1913–1914	4 inline	3,866 cc	33 kW (45 PS)	90 km/h (56 mph)
9/24 PS	1913–1914	4 inline	2,313 cc	17,6 kW (24 PS)	70 km/h (43 mph)
25/55 PS	1913–1914	4 inline	6,457 cc	44 kW (60 PS)	
KL 6/16 PS	1913–1920	4 inline	1,551 cc	11,8 kW (16 PS)	60 km/h (37 mph)
12/30 PS	1914	4 inline	3,115 cc	25,7 kW (35 PS)	
9/24 (9/30) PS	1921–1924	4 inline	2,298 cc	17,6–22 kW (24–30 PS)	65 km/h (40 mph)–75 km/h (47 mph)
12/34 (12/40) PS	1921–1924	4 inline	3,115 cc	25–29 kW (34–40 PS)	85 km/h (53 mph)
18/60 PS	1921–1924	4 inline	4,712 cc	44 kW (60 PS)	100 km/h (62 mph)
6/22 PS	1922–1923	4 inline	1,550 cc	16 kW (22 PS)	75 km/h (47 mph)
10/50 PS	1925–1927	6 inline	2,580 cc	37 kW (50 PS)	90 km/h (56 mph)
18/80 PS	1925–1927	6 inline	4,704 cc	59 kW (80 PS)	100 km/h (62 mph)
6/25 PS	1925–1928	4 inline	1,550 cc	18 kW (25 PS)	80 km/h (50 mph)
Standard 6	1927–1928	6 inline	2,540 cc	33 kW (45 PS)	85 km/h (53 mph)–90 km/h (56 mph)
Standard 8	1928–1933	8 inline	3,887 cc	51–59 kW (70–80 PS)	100 km/h (62 mph)–105 km/h (65 mph)
Standard 6 A/S	1928–1934	6 inline	2,916 cc	37 kW (50 PS)	85 km/h (53 mph)–90 km/h (56 mph)
Favorit	1929–1933	4 inline	1,943 cc	25,7 kW (35 PS)	80 km/h (50 mph)
Primus 1,5 A	1932–1934	4 inline	1,504 cc	23,5–24,2 kW (32–33 PS)	90 km/h (56 mph)
Trumpf 1,5 AV	1932–1934	4 inline	1,504 cc	23,5–24,2 kW (32–33 PS)	95 km/h (59 mph)
Favorit 2U	1933–1934	4 inline	1,943 cc	29 kW (40 PS)	90 km/h (56 mph)
Standard 6 3U	1933–1934	6 inline	2,916 cc	44 kW (60 PS)	100 km/h (62 mph)
Achtzylinder	1933–1934	8 inline	3,887 cc	59 kW (80 PS)	105 km/h (65 mph)
Trumpf Sport	1933–1935	4 inline	1,645 cc	34,5 kW (47 PS)	115 km/h (71 mph)
Primus 1,7 A	1933–1936	4 inline	1,645 cc	28 kW (38 PS)	95 km/h (59 mph)
Trumpf 1,7 AV	1933–1936	4 inline	1,645 cc	28 kW (38 PS)	100 km/h (62 mph)
Diplomat	1934–1938	6 inline	2,916 cc	44–48 kW (60–65 PS)	100 km/h (62 mph)–105 km/h (65 mph)
Trumpf Junior 1G/E	1934–1941	4 inline	995 cc	18,4 kW (25 PS)	90 km/h (56 mph)
Trumpf Junior Sport	1935–1937	4 inline	995 cc	20,6 kW (28 PS)	110 km/h (68 mph)
Trumpf 1,7 EV	1936–1938	4 inline	1,645 cc	28 kW (38 PS)	102 km/h (63 mph)
Primus 1,7 E	1937–1938	4 inline	1,645 cc	28 kW (38 PS)	100 km/h (62 mph)
Adler 2.5-litre	1937–1940	6 inline	2,494 cc	42,6 kW (58 PS)	125 km/h (78 mph)
Adler 2.5-litre Sport	1938–1939	6 inline	2,494 cc	59 kW (80 PS)	150 km/h (93 mph)
2 Liter	1938–1940	4 inline	1,910 cc	33 kW (45 PS)	110 km/h (68 mph)

== Galleries ==
=== Adler automobiles ===
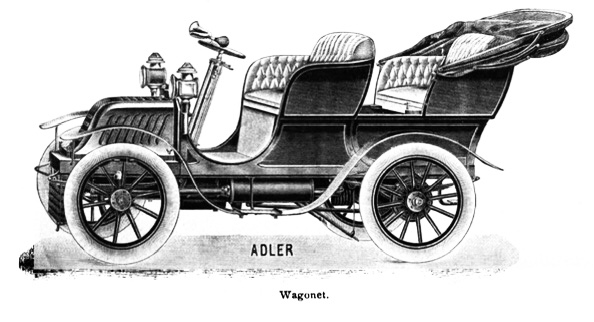
Adler wagonette (1902)

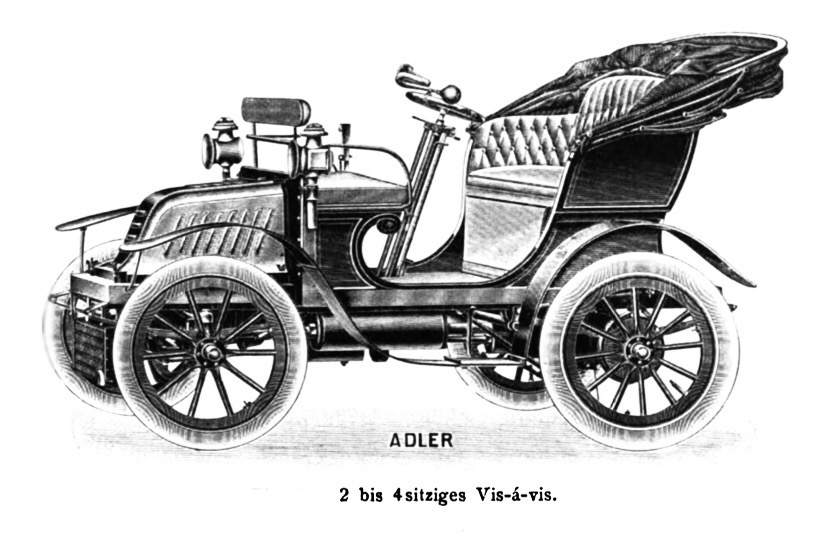
Adler vis à vis (1902)

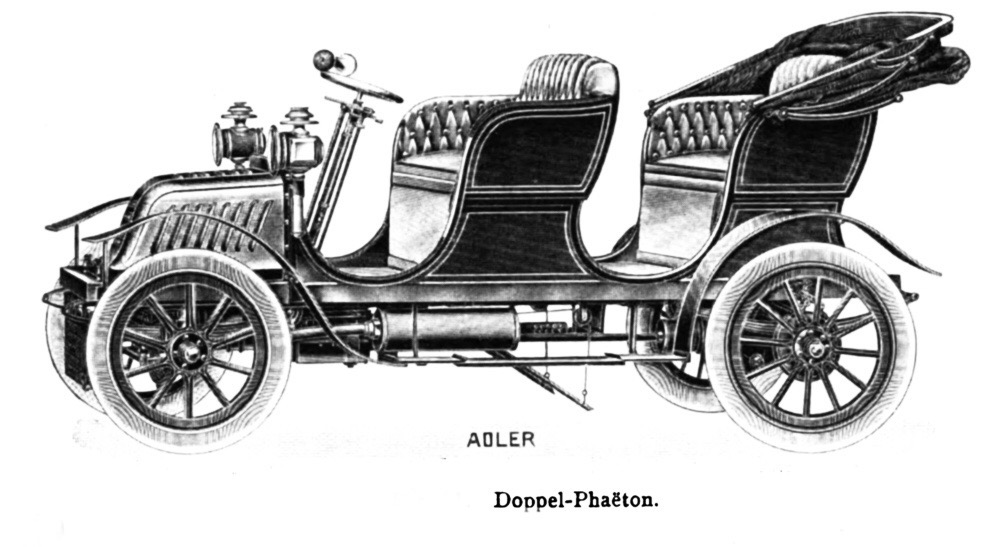
Adler phaeton (1902)

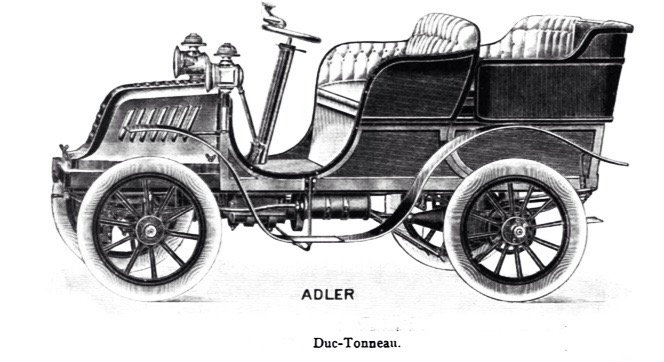
Adler duc tonneau (1902)

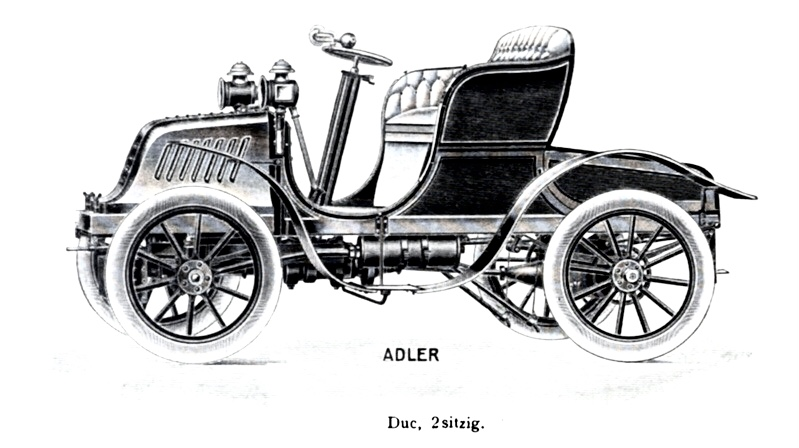
Adler duc (1902)

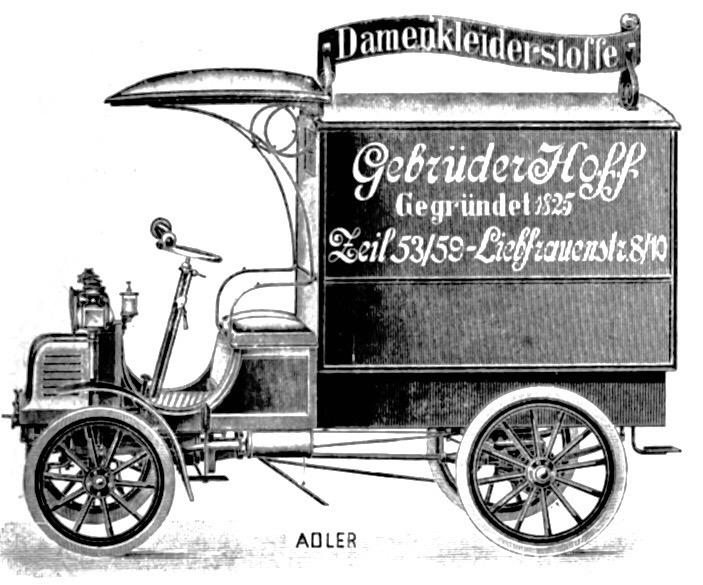
Adler delivery van (1902)

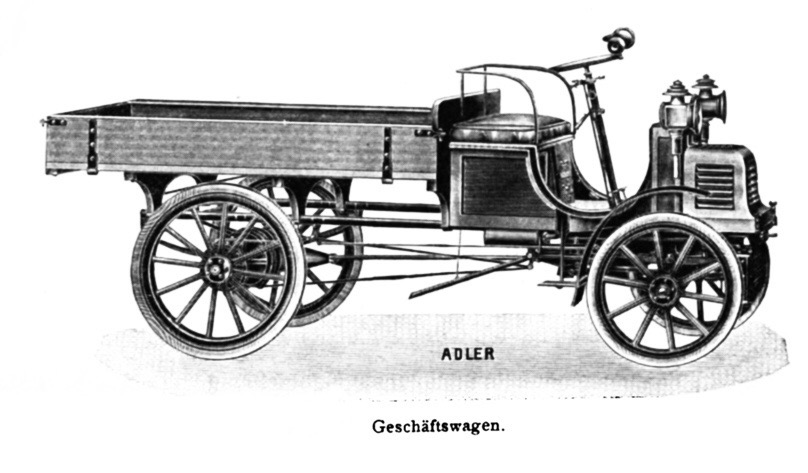
Adler pickup truck (1902)

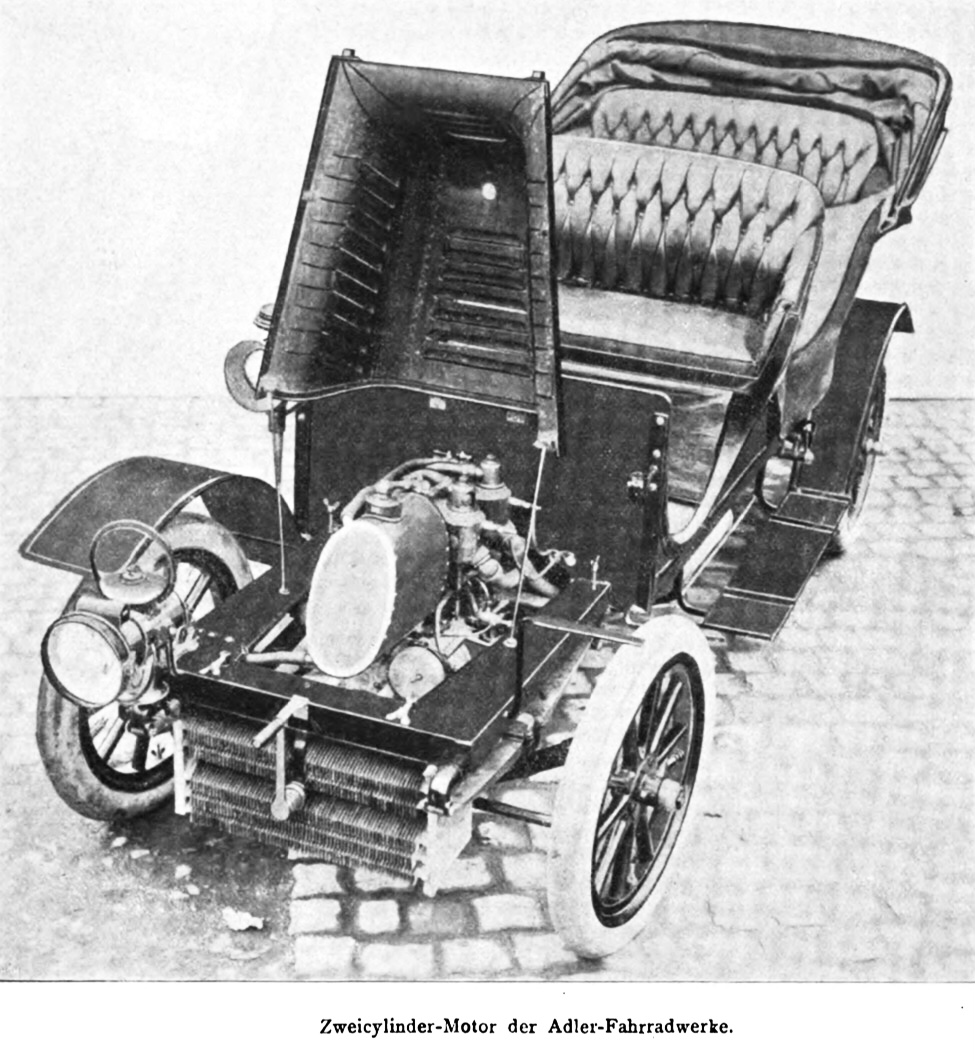
Adler two-cylinder with open hood (1902)

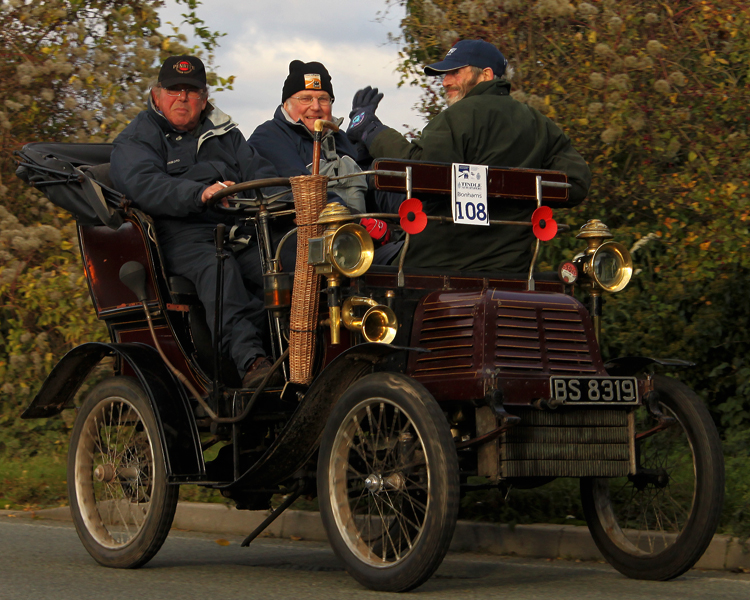
Adler 4 1/2HP Vis-à-vis 1901

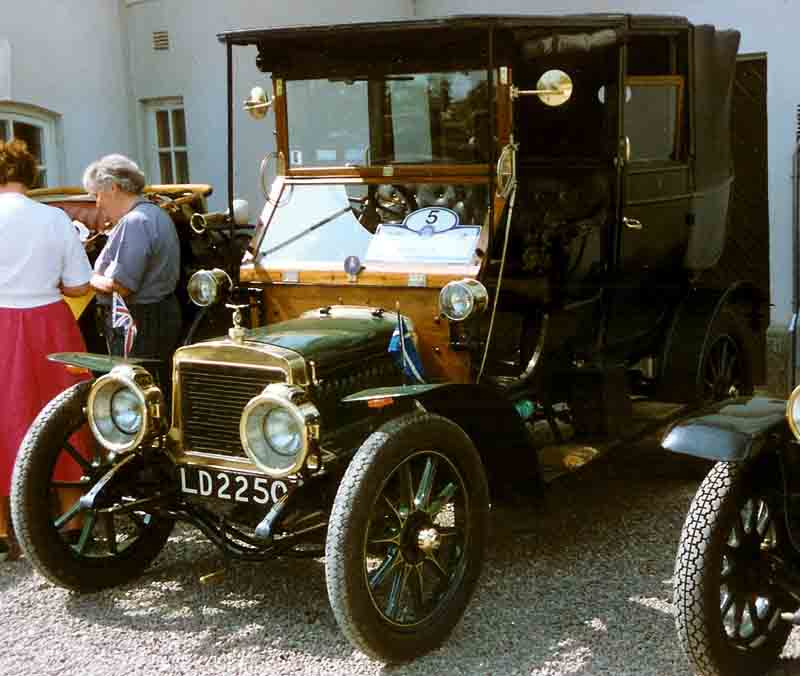
1909 Adler

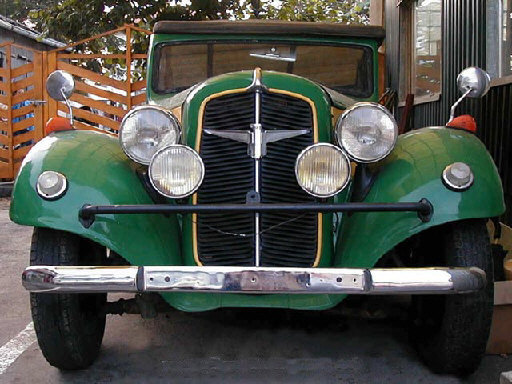
Adler Trumpf Junior

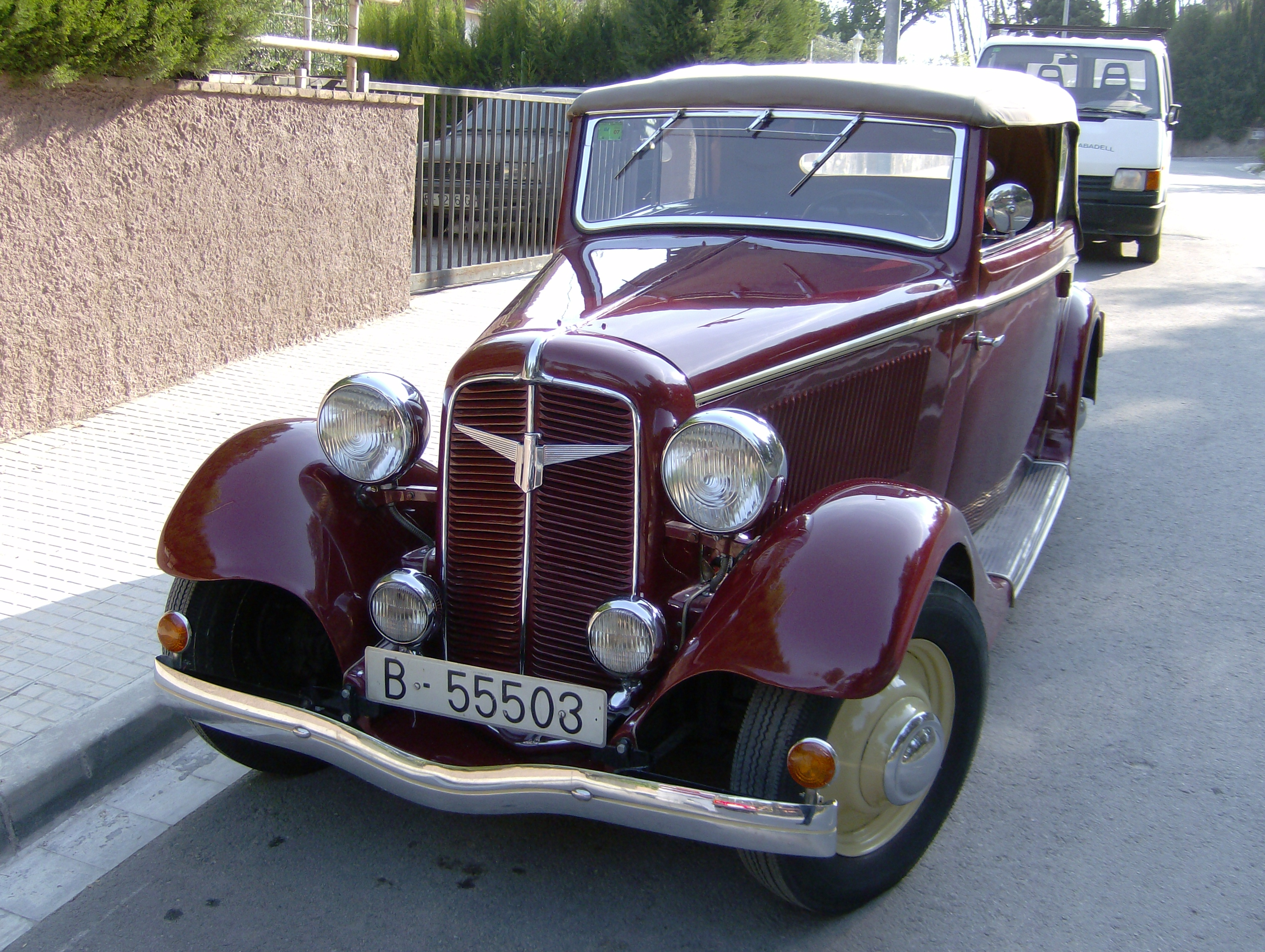
1934 Adler Trumpf 1.7 Liter Karman from Barcelona

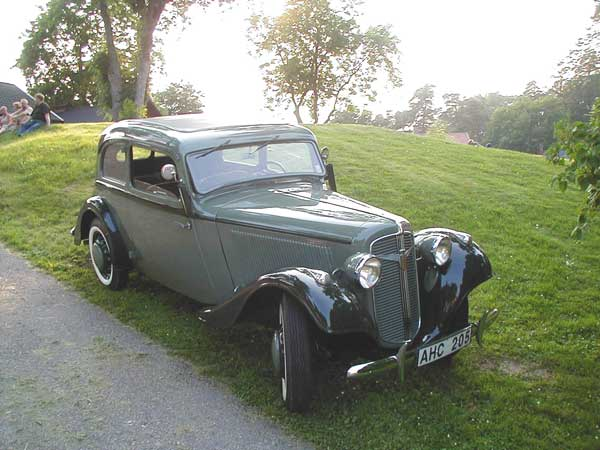
1939 Adler Trumpf Junior

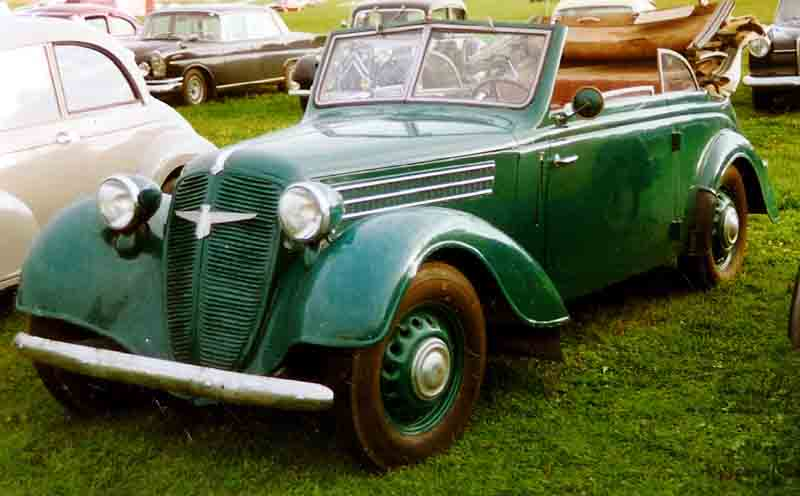
1939 Adler 2 Liter

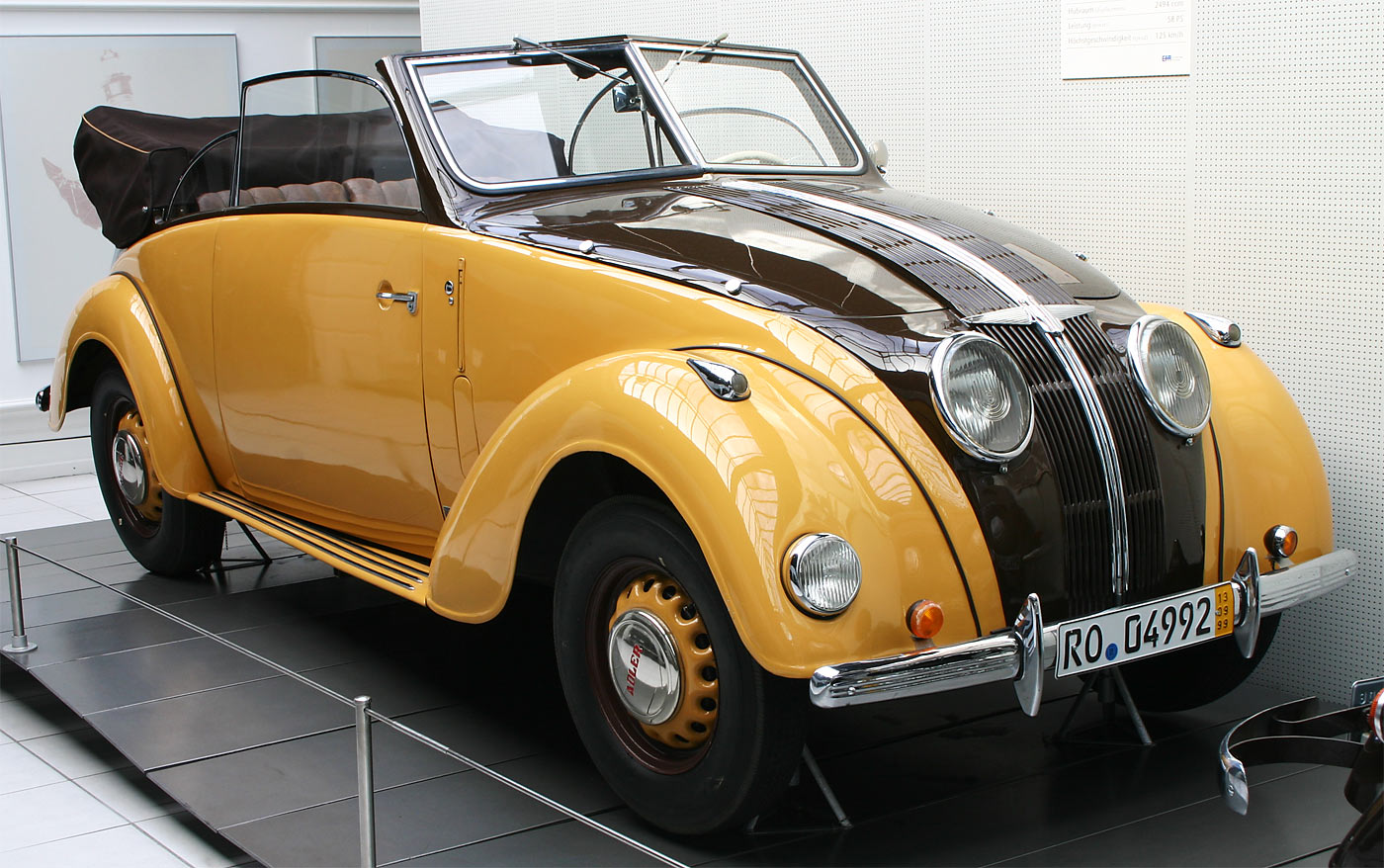
Adler 2.5 Liter Cabrio

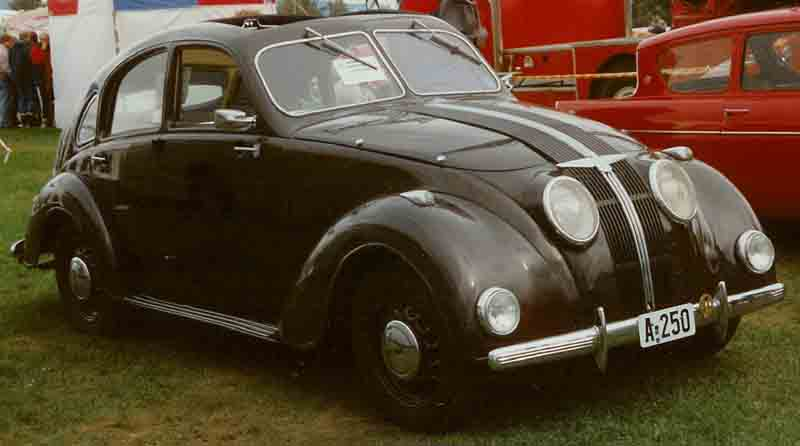
Adler 2.5 Liter

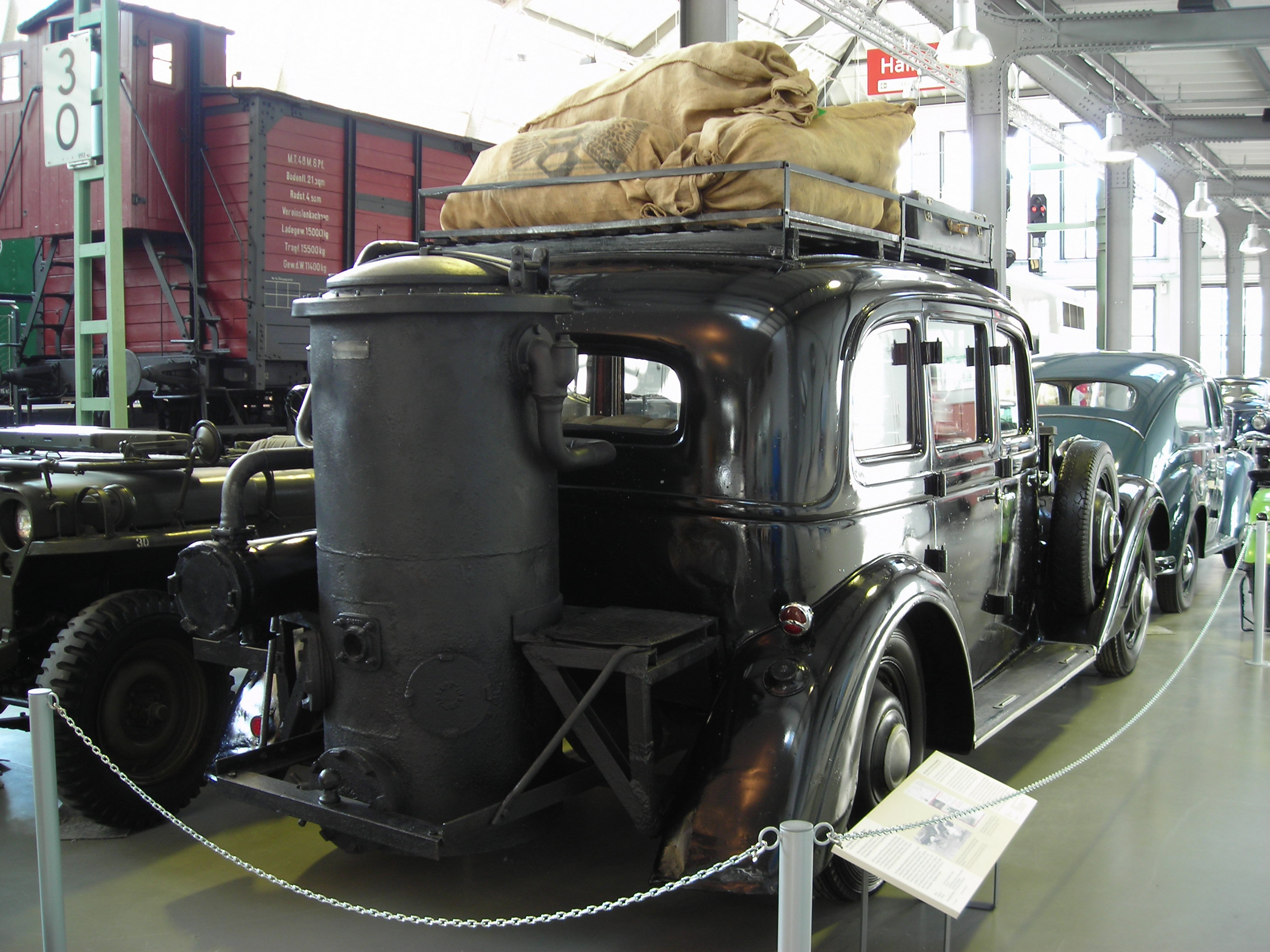
Adler Diplomat 3 with gas generator

=== Adler motorcycles ===
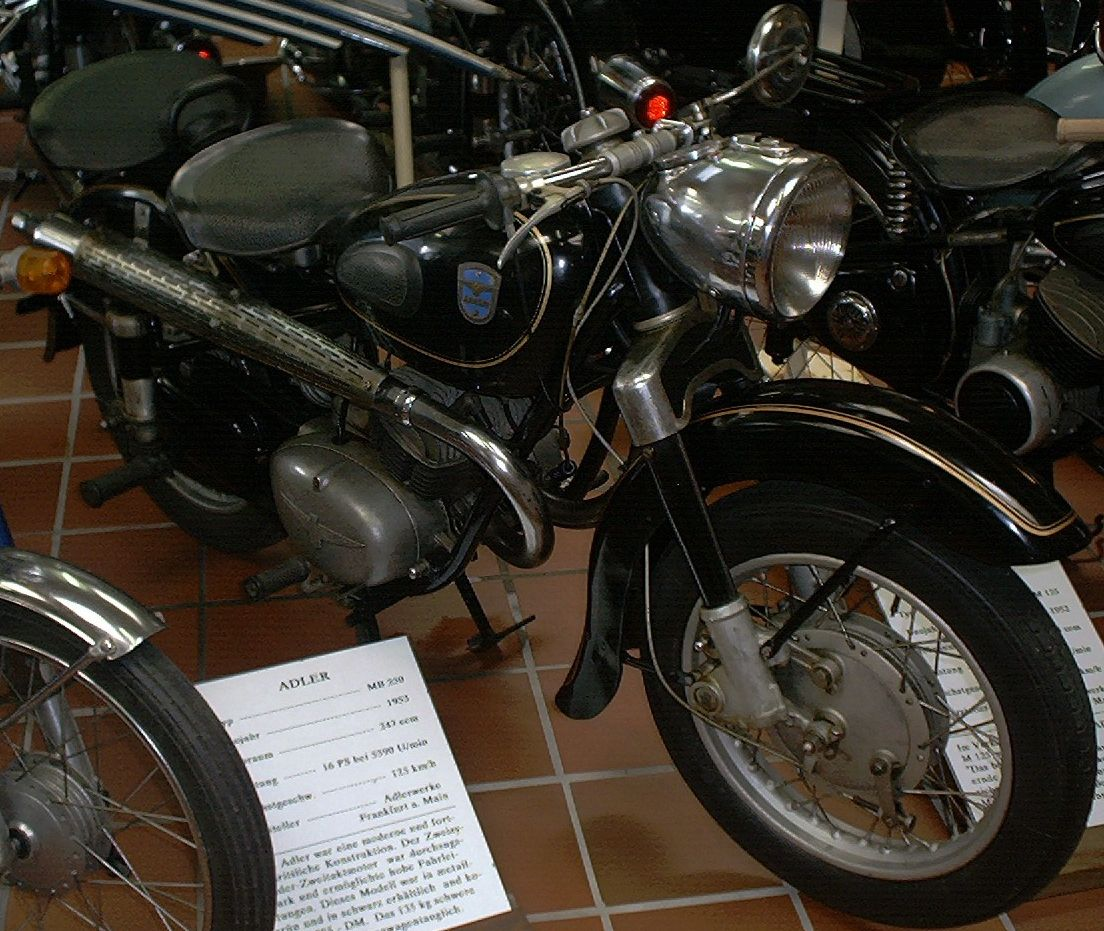
1953 Adler MB 250

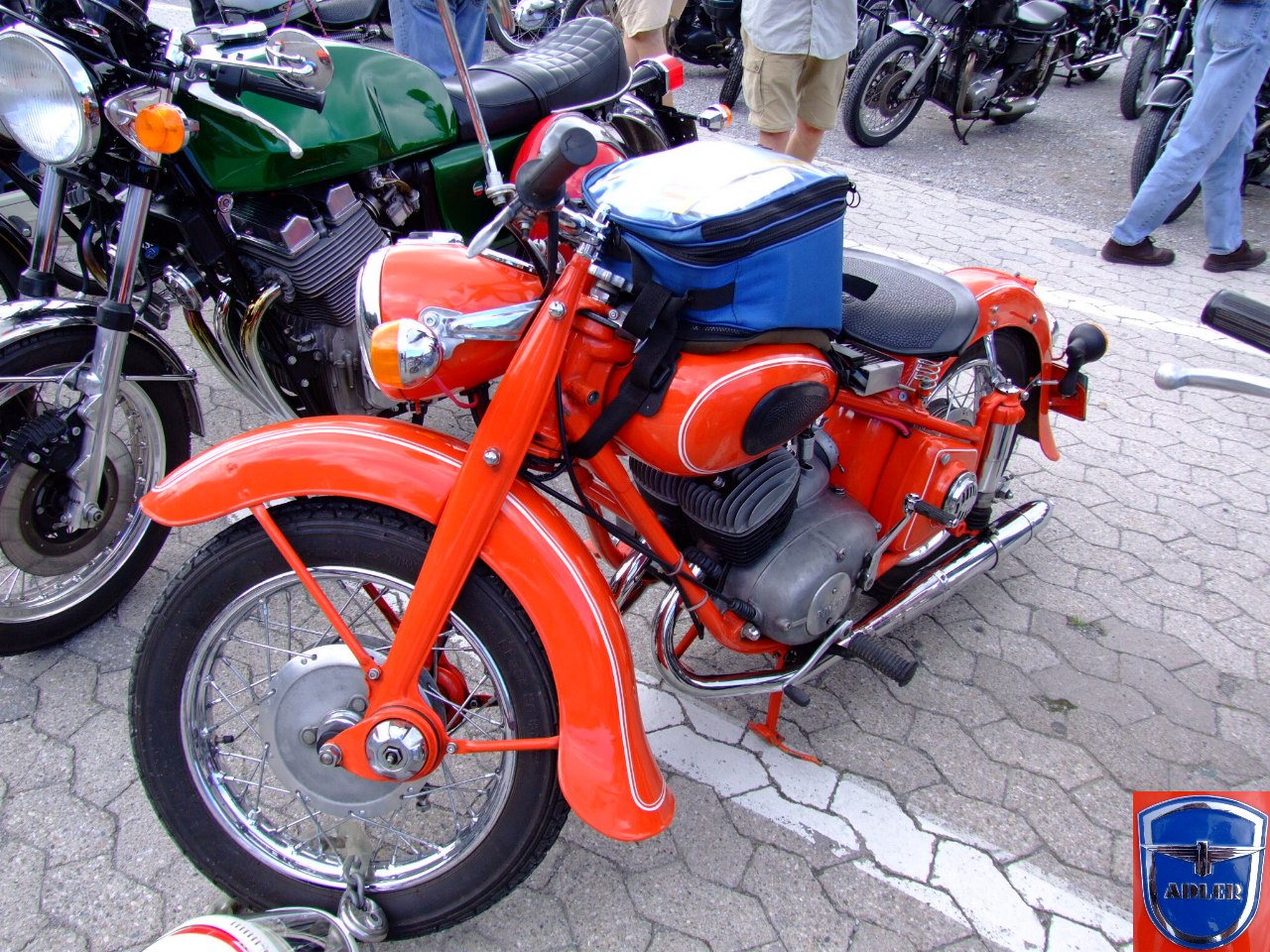
Adler motorcycle

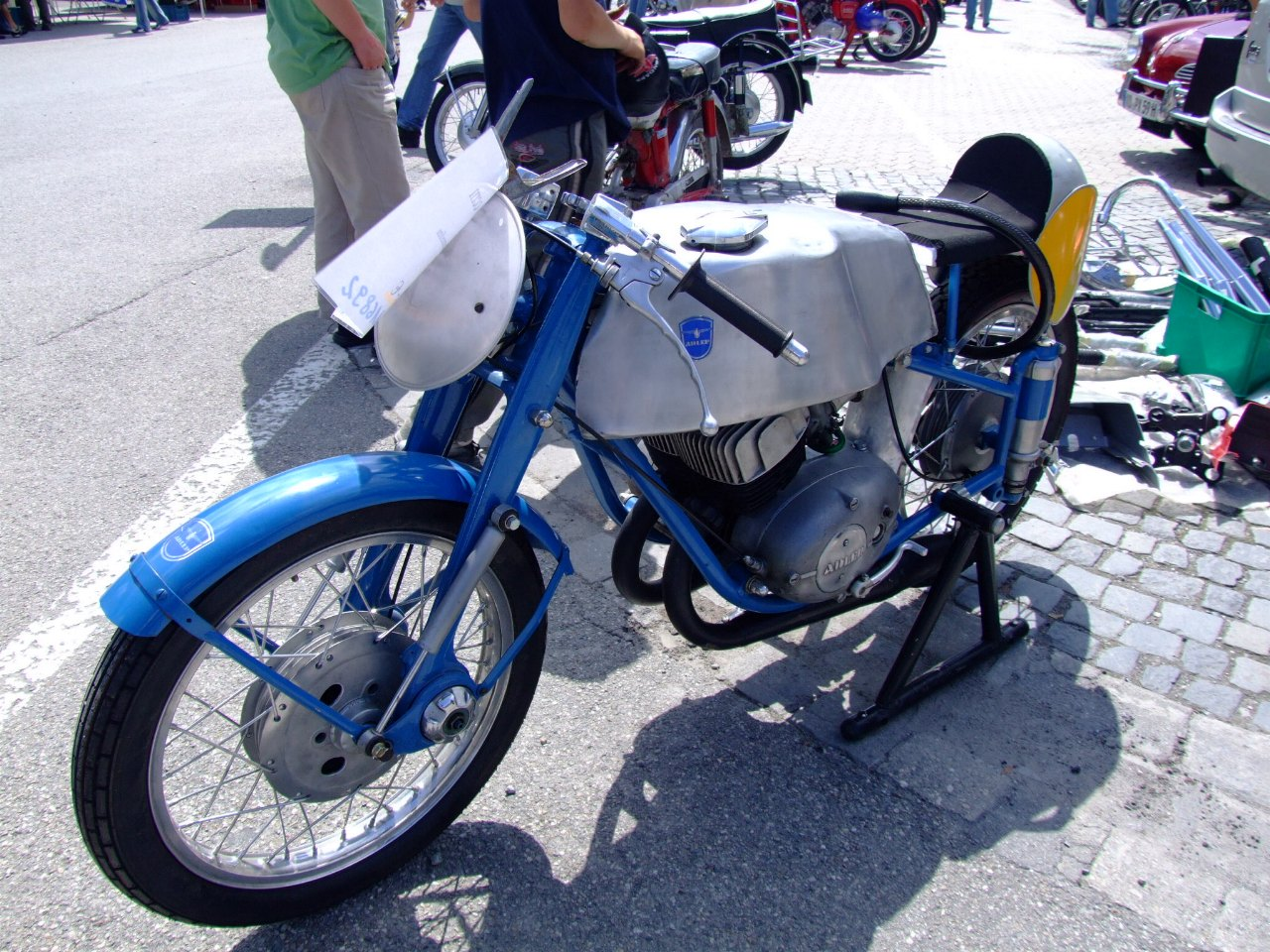
1953 Adler RS 250
