= Adler Standard 6 =

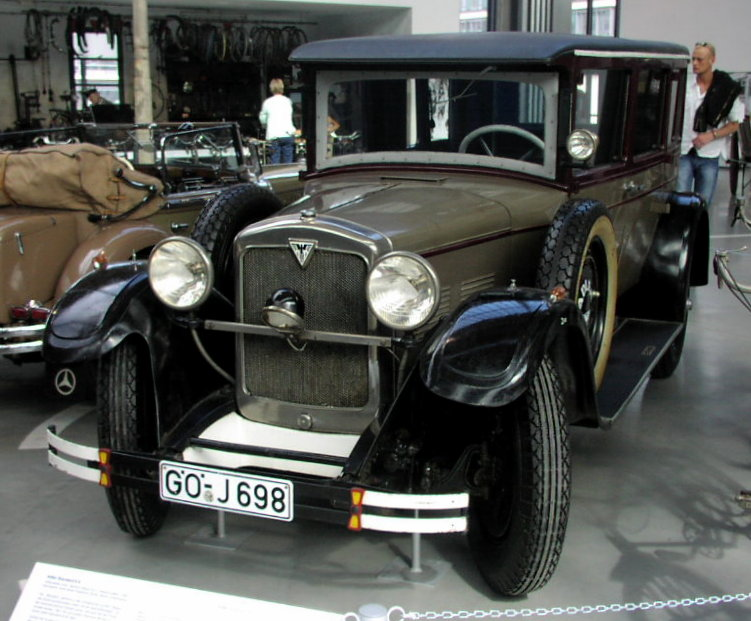
- Adler Standard 6S 1928

Overview
- Manufacturer: Adlerwerke
- Also called: Adler Standard 6 10/45; Adler Standard 6 12/50; Adler Standard 6 (3U)
- Production: 1927 – March 1934; 21,249 units
- Assembly: Frankfurt am Main
- Designer: Prof. Dr. Ing. Gabriel Becker

Body and chassis
- Body style: "Pullman Limousine" ("six-light 4 door saloon); Various coach built bodies supplied in relatively small numbers by a number of coach builders.
- Layout: FR layout

Powertrain
- Engine: 1927 - 1926; 2,540 cc 6 cylinder in-line 1928 - 1934; 2,916 cc 6 cylinder in-line
- Transmission: 1927 – 1934; 3-speed manual 1933 - 1934; 4-speed manual with lockable freewheel (new bodied "3U" model only)

Dimensions
- Wheelbase: 1927 - 1933 2,840 mm (112 in) or 3,140 mm (124 in) 1933 - 1934; 3,200 mm (130 in) (new bodied "3U" model)
- Length: 1927 - 1933; 4,270 mm (168 in) (standard bodied cars) 1933 - 1934; 4,750 mm (187 in) (new bodied "3U" model)
- Width: 1927 - 1933; 1,650 mm (65 in) 1933 - 1934; 1,740 mm (69 in) (new bodied "3U" model)
- Height: 1927 - 1933; 1,825 mm (71.9 in) 1933 - 1934; 1,650 mm (65 in) (new bodied "3U" model)

Chronology
- Successor: Adler Diplomat 12/60

The Adler Standard 6 was the most important newcomer at the Berlin Motor Show in October 1926. It was a substantial six cylinder "limousine" (saloon) built by the Frankfurt auto-maker, Adler. Other body styles were available from coach builders. The model continued to be produced until 1934.

The Standard 6 shared its wheel base with the less expensive four cylinder Adler Favorit which appeared early in 1929. The Standard 6 was also in most respects the blueprint for the longer more powerful eight cylinder engined Adler Standard 8 which arrived in 1928.

== Inspired by Chrysler ==
The basic architecture of the car with its rigid axles, high body and "overslung" chassis was in essence copied from Chrysler models of the time. One result of this was that the Adler Standard 6 was the first volume-produced German car able to compete effectively with the Chryslers which in the 1920s competed powerfully with Germany's domestic auto-makers in this class. Brakes operated on all four wheels and were hydraulically controlled, which again, was seen as reflecting US influence on Gabriel Becker, the car's Berlin-based designer.

According to Oswald Becker also imported some of the North American auto industry's less commendable aspects, including a very imprecise steering mechanism and, in the early models, engines that lasted only for about 17,000 km (11,500 miles). However, the Adler technicians worked on what turned out to be teething troubles, and soon the Adler Standard 6 became a favourite with the German upper middle class and with taxi operators.

== Evolution ==
=== Adler Standard 6N 10/45 (1927 – 1930) ===
Following its motor show launch in October 1926, volume production of the Adler Standard 6 got under way during the early part of 1927.

The six cylinder side-valve 2,540 cc engine drove the rear wheels through a three speed gear box and provided a claimed maximum output of 45 PS (33 kW; 44 hp) at 3,000 rpm. The figures 10/45 in the car's name referred respectively to the Tax horsepower (on which car tax was based till 1928) and actual horsepower in PS (i.e. applying the German standard formula).

The car was offered with a standard wheelbase of 2,840 mm (112 in) or a longer wheelbase of 3,140 mm (124 in). The Shorter wheelbase Standard 6N continued as the entry-level model until 1930, but the longer wheel base ceased to be available with the 6N's engine before the end of 1928. The standard body was made from steel which at this time was a common feature on North American cars but still unusual in Europe.

By 1930 Adler had produced 6,533 of their Standard 6Ns.

=== Adler Standard 6A 12/50 (1928 – 1933) & Adler Standard 6S 12/50 (1928 – 1934) ===
The Standard 6A and 6S had been added to the range by the end of 1928. They still featured straight six engines, but the bore was increased and the total engine size was 2,916 cc. Claimed maximum power from the 2,916 cc engine was 60 PS (44 kW; 59 hp). Apart from the cylinder bore, the engine was little changed from the 2,540 cc unit of the Standard 6N, but the compression ratio was slightly raised, and during the production run a Stromberg U1 carburetor replaced the Pallas SAD 3 carburettor which initially was carried over from the 6N.

=== Adler Standard 6 (3U) (1933 – 1934) ===
The rebodied Standard 6 (3U) appeared at the Berlin Motor Show in February 1933. The 2,916cc 60 PS (44 kW; 59 hp) side-valve six cylinder engine was carried forward from the existing Standard 6. The new car had a lower body frame and independent suspension at the front like the smaller engined Adler Favorit which appeared in the same year. Attention also focused on the new ZF four speed transmission and the standard all-steel body which, as before, came from Ambi-Budd in the Spandau district of Berlin.

400 of these cars were built before the model was replaced by the Adler Diplomat which came with a new engine, a new name and a year later, from 1935, a new body. The change of name had become necessary following a rash of new model launches across the German auto-industry in the early 1930s causing the name "Standard" – which has a meaning in German not dissimilar to its meaning in English - to become unappealing in a decade of growth and an increasingly competitive market for new cars.

== Celebrity architects ==
The Kleyer brothers, sons of the Adler founder Heinrich Kleyer, were friends of the architect Walter Gropius whose Bauhaus movement was continuing to attract much interest among the chattering classes. Gropius developed a completely new body for the Adler Standard which was exhibited at the Paris Motor Show in October 1930 and a few months later at the Berlin show. The cars attracted much attention and comment, but very few serious customers. As far as is known 3 of the Gropius designed Adler Standard saloons were built by coachbuilders Neuss and a further 3 cabriolets were built by coachbuilders Karmann. The Gropius venture into car design is accordingly historically interesting but not commercially significant.

The exercise had its parallel in France where at about the same time Le Corbusier undertook a similar exercise for the auto-maker Voisin, apparently encountering similarly lacklustre customer demand in return for his effort.

== Celebrity global circumnavigation ==
Between 1927 and 1929 the Mülheim born racing driver Clärenore Stinnes, driving an Adler Standard 6, undertook the first recorded successful round-the-world drive.
