= Ambi Budd =

Ambi-Budd was a German automobile body company founded by Edward Gowen Budd.

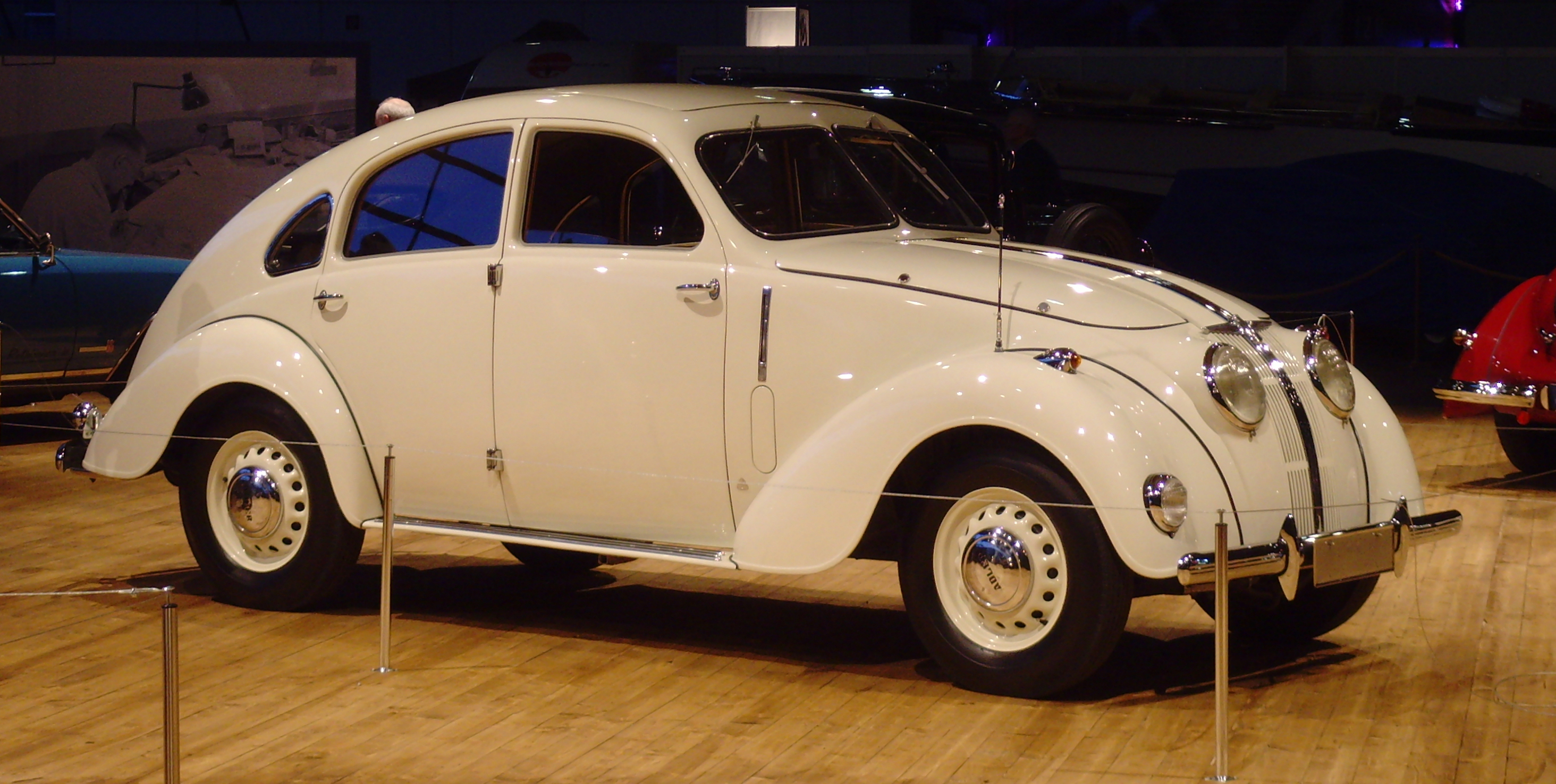
Ambi Budd built the bodies for the Adler 2.5-litre 4-door saloon

In Germany, Edward Gowen Budd worked with Arthur Müller and set up a steel pressing plant Ambi Budd Presswerke (ABP) in the old Rumpler factory and became a successful supplier of pressed-steel components. "Ambi" stood for "Arthur Müller Bauten und Industriewerke". Budd Philadelphia U.S. owned 26% of the Adler stock and were located next door to the German assembly plant for American associate Chrysler. Budd supplied bodies for early BMWs as well as German Fords. In 1943, the company had to move production underground due to bomb attacks from the allied air forces. They also made parts for the Focke Wulf fighter, jerrycans, and bodies for the Volkswagen Kübelwagen and Schwimmwagen light vehicles. The Berlin plants were completely destroyed by bombing during World War II. After the war, the Budd plant ended up in the Soviet sector. The machines and tools were dismantled and most of them shipped to the Soviet Union.

Ambi-Budd merged with Thyssen AG and Krupp AG in 1999 becoming a part of ThyssenKrupp and known as Thyssen-Krupp Budd.

Thyssen-Krupp Budd North America body and chassis operations were acquired in November 2006 by Martinrea International.

== See also ==
- Budd Company
- Joseph Ledwinka
