= Adler Trumpf Junior =

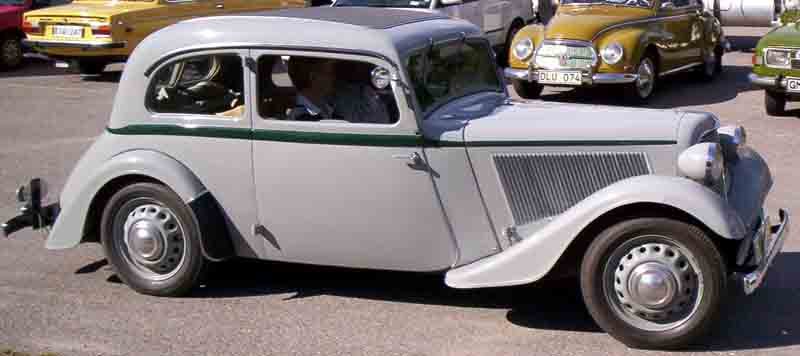
- Adler Trumpf Junior (1936 – 1941) with the standard "Jupiter" Ambi-Budd all-steel sedan/saloon body

Overview
- Manufacturer: Adlerwerke
- Also called: 1934–35: Adler Trumpf Junior (1G); 1936–41: Adler Trumpf Junior (1E); 1935–37: Adler Trumpf Junior Sport
- Production: 1934–35: (1G) 24,013 units 1936–41: (1E) 78,827 units
- Assembly: Frankfurt am Main, Germany
- Designer: Hans Gustav Röhr & Josef Dauben

Body and chassis
- Body style: “Cabrio-Limousine” (2-door Saloon/sedan with fold-away canvas roof) “Limousine” (2-door Saloon/sedan); 2- door Cabriolet; Sports (Roadster); Also offered in “bare chassis” configuration 1938/39
- Layout: FF layout

Powertrain
- Engine: 995 cc 4 cylinder in-line side-valve
- Transmission: 4-speed manual. No synchromesh.

Dimensions
- Wheelbase: 2,630 mm (103.5 in)
- Length: 1934-35 (1G): 3,860 mm (152.0 in); 1936-41 (1E): 4,250 mm (167.3 in)
- Width: 1934-35 (1G): 1,450 mm (57.1 in); 1936-41 (1E): 1,470 mm (57.9 in); 1935-37 (Sport): 1,520 mm (59.8 in)
- Height: 1934-35 (1G): 1,460 mm (57.5 in); 1936-41 (1E): 1,520 mm (59.8 in); 1935-37 (Sport): 1,360 mm (53.5 in)

The Adler Trumpf Junior is a small family car introduced by the Frankfurt based auto-maker Adler, early in 1934. Trumpf Junior was conceived as a similar but smaller version of the Adler Trumpf, which had already been available for two years. It intended to broaden the range and claim a share of a growing market which DKW were creating with their F1 model, and its successors, for small inexpensive front wheel drive cars.

The Trumpf Junior's development was a shared responsibility between Hans Gustav Röhr (1895 – 1937) and his colleague and friend, Adler chief engineer Josef Dauben .

== The engine ==
The engine was a four-cylinder four stroke 995 cc side-valve unit. Claimed maximum power was 25 PS (18.4 kW; 24.7 hp) at 4,000 rpm. This supported a claimed top speed of 90 km/h (56 mph). Power was delivered to the front wheels via a four speed manual transmission controlled by means of a column-mounted lever.

== The bodies ==
When launched at the start of 1934, the car came with a choice between a small two door “Limousine” (sedan/saloon) with a recommended price of 2,750 Marks and a small two door “Cabrio-Limousine” which was effectively a two-door sedan/saloon with a canvas foldable roof, available for only 2,650 Marks. Comparisons with the smaller engined DKW Meisterklasse F4 were unavoidable: DKW's recommended price for the DKWs was 2,500 Marks and 2,600 Marks respectively for their Limousine and Cabrio-Limousine bodied cars.

In 1935, Adler broadened the Trumpf Junior range, now offering in addition to the Limousine and Cabrio-Limousine, two and four seater cabriolets and 2 seater sports models. The range was topped off by a version of sports model with its maximum engine power raised to 25 PS (18 kW; 25 hp), priced at 4,150 Marks.

The bodies on the 1935 cars were of lightweight timber frame construction, covered by a synthetic leather skin. This followed the structural choice still used by DKW for their small front wheel drive DKW Meisterklasse F4. However, the use of synthetic leather skin which had a tendency to rot, attracted adverse comment for both manufacturers and by 1935 buyers of the Adler Trumpf Junior saloon/sedan could pay an extra 200 Marks for a timber frame car covered not by synthetic leather but by sheet steel.

At the start of the 1930s timber frame construction would have been a natural choice for small inexpensive cars. It relied on timber based craft skills that had been developed over generations in the carriage building trade and were still readily available. However, all-steel car bodies were already increasingly mainstream in North America where they had been introduced before the First World War, and they offered clear advantages in terms of reduced weight, increased strength, a better view out (because the strength of the steel allowed for larger windows), and a reduced propensity to burn uncontrollably if an engine caught fire, which in the 1930s engines regularly could. Adler's own Standard 6 model had, in terms of the German auto-industry, pioneered the use of all-steel car bodies from its launch in 1927. Much of the extra expense of producing steel bodied cars arose before a single car had been produced, with a high capital outlay being needed for investment in the heavy presses and dies needed to produce the pressings for the body panels. But with market demand for small cars growing rapidly in the 1930s, economies of scale entered the picture, and if a manufacturer could amortise the initial capital costs for a single model over many tens of thousand of cars, the unit cost of an all-steel body was no longer prohibitive. In 1936 Adler started to produce the Trumpf Junior saloon/sedan with an all-steel body and priced the car at 2,950 Marks, which was exactly the same price that they were now asking for the same car with a timber frame body. Both body types continued to be listed until 1939, but following a 250 Mark price reduction for the steel bodied car in 1937, it was the steel bodied car that came with the lower price. The standard all-steel bodies were provided by Germany's larger supplier of steel car bodies, Ambi-Budd of Berlin. Slightly unusually for a car-body design, this one had a name, and the steel bodied Trump Juniors were known as the “Jupiter” bodied Trumpf Juniors. However, the name was one which was shared with the slightly larger steel bodied Adler Trumpf which had been available with an all-steel “Jupiter” steel body from Ambi-Budd since 1932.

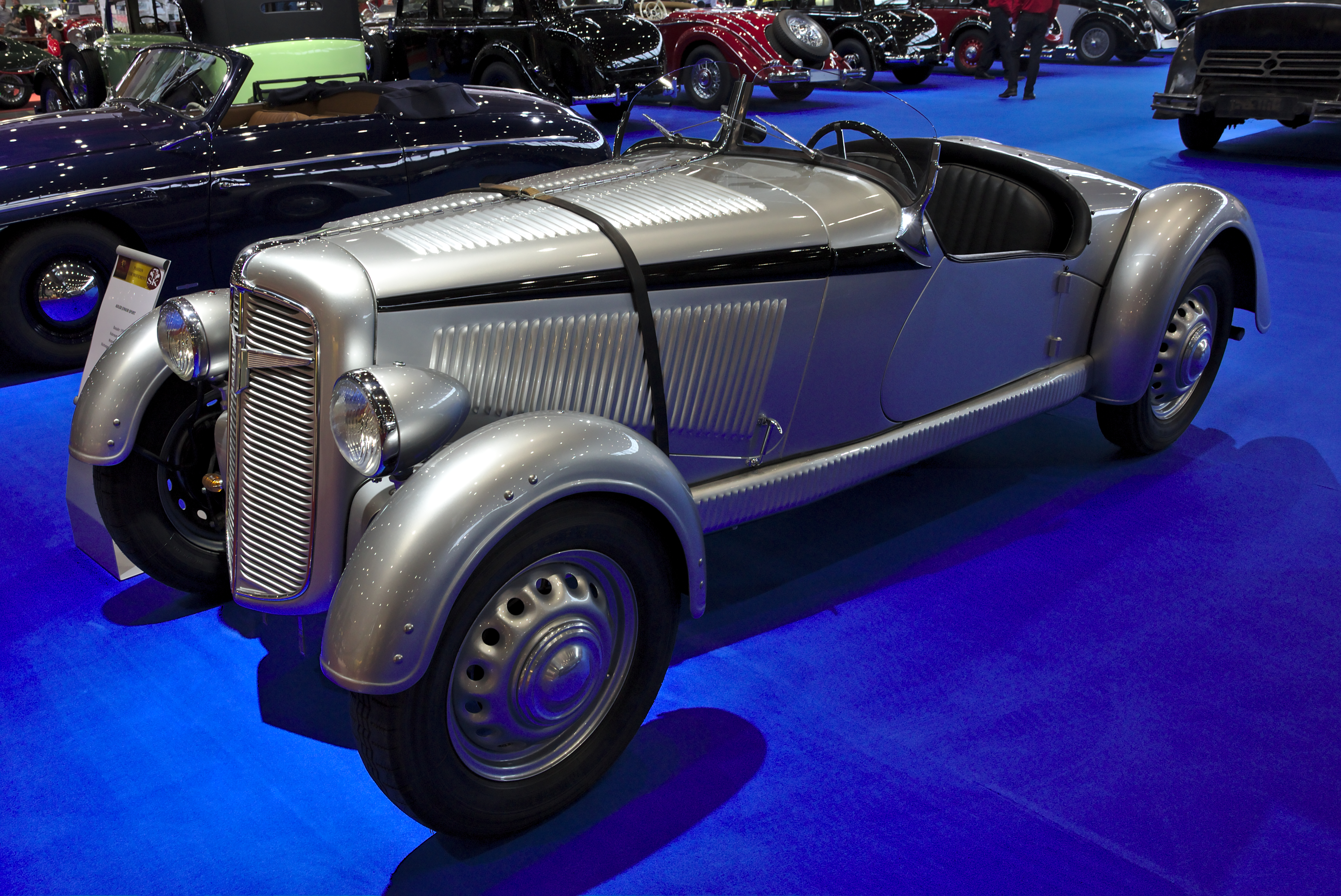
Adler Trumpf Junior Sport, built in 1935

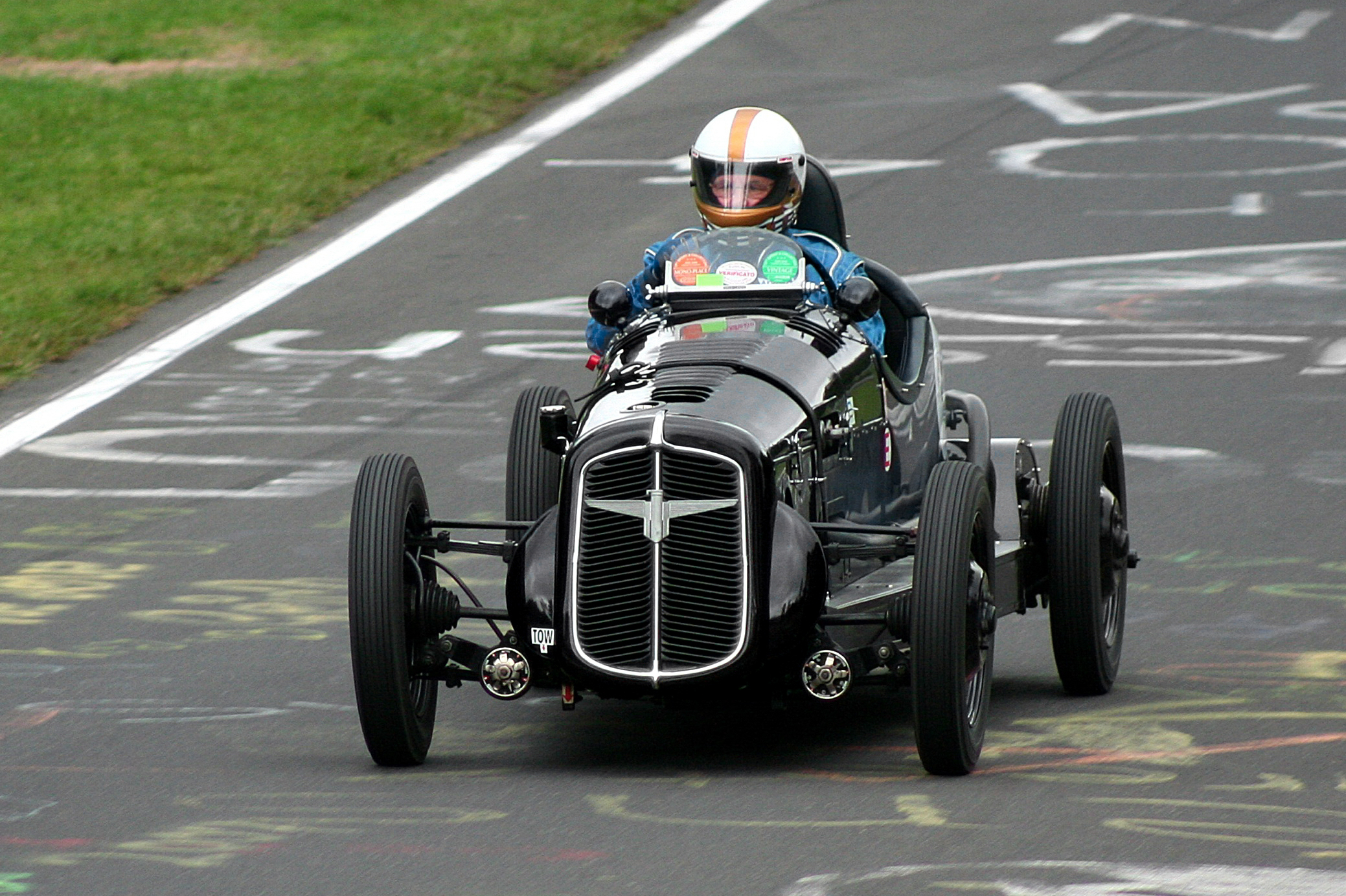
Single seater from 1936 based on Adler Trumpf Junior at Nürburgring

== 1936 Trumpf Junior (1G) replaced by Trumpf Junior (1E) ==
At the start of 1936, the Trumpf Junior (1G) was replaced by the Trumpf Junior (1E). The engine and 2,630 mm (103.5 in) wheel-base were unchanged, but a range of 390 mm (15.4 in) longer and more streamlined of bodies was introduced. From 1936 until production ended in 1941 these standard bodies would be offered without further changes.

“Limousine” and “Cabrio-Limousine” bodies for the 1936 cars continued to come from Ambi-Budd while production of the four seater cabriolet bodies was split between Ambi-Budd and Karmann of Osnabrück. The stylish and more costly two seater cabriolet bodies came from various coachbuilders including Wendler of Reutlingen.

== Commercial ==
In August 1939 Adler produced the 100,000th Trumpf Junior which by then had become by far the company's best selling car to that date and, as things later turned out, of all time. 23,013 of the cars produced had been of the 1934-35 (1G) version, and by the time production came to a complete halt in 1941 Adler had added 78,827 of the 1936-41 (1E) version.

== Post-war auto-production revival aborted ==
Like many German auto-makers, Adler emerged from the Second World War confronting many obstacles. It avoided having its factory plant crated up and sent by train to Moscow, unlike Opel, and it did not share in the fate of DKW and BMW of finding its principal plant in the Soviet occupation zone, cut off from control, customers and principal suppliers. However, its Frankfurt home base turned out to have been chosen as the focal point for the US occupation zone. The company's factory had been badly damaged in an air-raid on 24 March 1944, and after the war the site was commandeered by the US military so was no longer available to Adler.

Ironically, at a time when no new cars were being produced, a disproportionately large number of the few private cars that had survived the hostilities were prewar DKW F series cars and Adler Trumpf Juniors. Many cars had been commandeered during the war by the military, and after the collapse of the German army cars that had been carefully concealed from German soldiers were now requisitioned by American, Russian and British soldiers. However, soldiers from each successive army demonstrated a shared reluctance to be seen driving pretty but small and not particularly fast front wheel drive Adlers and DKWs.

Despite the loss of the factory and of the company's (and the country's) principal supplier of steel car bodies (Ambi-Budd's Berlin factory having ended up in the Soviet sector of Berlin), Adler director Hermann Friedrich authorised the development of a post-war Adler Trumpf Junior. The chassis was to be little changed, apart from the repositioning of the gear-box ahead of the front axle, which required a lengthening of the car at the front by 150 mm (5.9 in). This would create more space in the passenger cabin and improve the weight balance over the drive axle. At the 1948 Hanover Trade Fair two prototypes Trumpf Juniors were exhibited, with bodies by Karmann of Osnabrück and Wendler of Reutlingen. The bodies were updated versions of the prewar Trumpf Junior sedan/saloon, resembling a slightly smoothed off Renault Juvaquatre. Production tooling was available, and there being no prospect of building the car at Adler's Frankfurt plant, an agreement was in place to use a nearby factory belonging to MAN, located on the north-eastern side of Gustavsburg.

Directly after the war, the victors, including the Soviet Union, had initially planned to deindustrialise Germany. Therefore, it would have been hard to anticipate in 1945 that by 1955 four of Germany's top five leading auto-producers from the 1930s were in some shape or form back in the business of producing cars. The exception was Adler, whose plans to resume auto-production were shelved during 1948, when the two prototypes exhibited at Hanover were scrapped. Until the company's demise in 1957, they concentrated instead on manufacturing motor cycles and type-writers.

== In film ==
A red convertible Trumpf Junior is visible in many scenes of the 1967 Soviet comedy Kidnapping, Caucasian Style.
