= Hans Gustav Röhr =

Hans Gustav Röhr (10 February 1895 – 10 August 1937) was a German aviation pioneer. After the First World War international treaty obligations imposed on Germany made this impossible and he applied his talents to automobiles. In 1926 he founded his own automobile manufacturing business, but this succumbed to bankruptcy in 1931. After that he worked for Adler. Here his responsibilities included design and development of new models. One of the cars he designed and developed, launched in 1932, was the Adler Trumpf which was both technologically innovative and successful commercially. He moved, as Technical Director, to Daimler-Benz in 1935, but his career was cut short by Pneumonia to which he succumbed, according to at least one report, after a drive in an open-topped car, and as a result of which he died.

== Biography ==
=== Provenance and early years ===
Hans Gustav Röhr was born at Uerdingen near Krefeld (into which it has subsequently been subsumed), close to the River Rhine. His father owned a lead rolling mill in the town. His father hoped that he would, in due course, take over the family business, and with that in mind Hans Gustav attended the Realprogymnasium (lower secondary school) in Uerdingen between 1905 and 1911. By the time he left school, however, it was clear that he had little enthusiasm for producing lead coils. By contrast, the aviation business – still in its infancy – had completely grabbed his enthusiasm.

=== Aviation ===
In 1911, still aged only 17, he accepted a two-year internship at Düsseldorf-Oberkassel with "Rheinischen Aerowerke GmbH", which he had been offered through the mediation of his friend Joseph Dauben (1889–1960) who was already employed as an engineer by the company. During 1912, Röhr and Dauben, who would remain friends for life, were able to use the facilities at the factory to construct a curiously futuristic airplane to Röhr's design. It was fitted with a five-cylinder radial engine which he constructed himself, using motorcycle cylinders, at a time when many aircraft designs were still using inline engines, and it featured a rod-supported single main wing plane while others believed that the future belonged to the biplanes. Another innovation was a closed cabin to protect the pilot from the weather. Sources differ as to the level of direct financial support he received from his family. One records that his father became progressively more alarmed by his son's obsession with so dangerous a hobby, meaning that the younger Röhr was obliged to accept "help from strangers". Even the Uedringer casino donated a few barrels of petrol to the dare-devil pioneer. The maiden flight of Röhr's monoplane took place in November 1913, vigorously applauded by onlookers and, in print, by the "Uerdinger Anzeiger" (local newspaper).

In 1914, Gustav Röhr senior, the father of Hans Gustav Röhr, died. All four of his sons inherited the leadership responsibilities for the lead mill. This suited Hans Gustav who was still left with plenty of time for his "hobby". In July/August 1914, war broke out and he reported to the flying corps ("Luftstreitkräfte") with his airplane. The advanced design failed to impress the military authorities, however, and the craft was sent back to Uerdingen.

Röhr himself volunteered to serve in the war as a fighter pilot. He received his flight training at the “Griesheimer Sand” airfield near Darmstadt. As a fighter pilot her served in Flanders and achieved two "kills", before himself being shot down in a "Dogfight". While he was recovering in a military hospital the military high command revisited the details of the airplane he had presented at the outset of the war: when he was ready to leave hospital, instead of being sent back to the front, he was mandated to develop a 600 PS airplane engine incorporating 21 cylinders, configured radially and fitted with a five-stage compressor. While retaining the military rank of flight-lieutenant, He now teamed up again with his friend Joseph Dauben.

Under wartime conditions many car factories and workshops were switched to production of airplanes and their components. The contract for the new engine was to be implemented at the Priamus Automobile Factory in Cologne-Sülz. In 1918 Röhr also took a financial interest in the (financially precarious) Priamus business, and between 1919 and 1921 he served as its chief executive ("Geschäftsführer"). For the wartime airplane engine, an ambitious power-to-weight target was set of one kilogramme per one unit of horse power. In November 1918, however, as a prototype engine was being made ready for the test-rig, news came through of the German military collapse on the western front. A condition of the armistice signed by the governments on 11 November was the military occupation of the Rhineland by the French and their allies, and in the chaos of those times, as a result of an indiscretion by one of the factory workers, the French military became aware of the existence of the advanced engines. Röhr had no choice but, with heavy heart, to arrange for their immediate destruction.

=== Automobiles ===
Under the terms of the Treaty of Versailles aircraft construction in Germany was forbidden. Röhr and Dauben switched their focus to automobile development. From the start they were keen to apply their experience of aviation to their work on motorcars. In the words of one source, they wanted to build the aircraft for the high road. That was the philosophy behind several prototypes that they constructed between 1919 and 1924. The elements of Röhr's later designs could already be seen in these prototypes, combining lightweight construction techniques in a car intended to appeal to the masses and to be priced accordingly, while incorporating the quality standards normally associated with the luxury end of the market. During 1919 and 1920 they progressed their work at the Priamus Factory in Sülz, but with the financial collapse of Priamus imminent Röhr resigned his directorship and they moved over to Berlin where they continued their development work at the Charlottenburg premises of the Bolle & Fiedler car and engine factory. (Carl Bolle (1893–1955) was both a successful businessman and, like Hans Gustav Röhr, a former wartime fighter pilot.) The result of their endeavours was a futuristic underslung chassis frame ("Tiefbettrahmen") using sheet steel and incorporating independent suspension, lightweight construction and, by the time they built their second prototype after moving to Berlin in 1920, hydraulically controlled brakes on all four wheels. The brakes proved problematic, however. As Germany lurched from sustained economic crisis to mere acute austerity, they were unable to find any automobile producer sufficiently adventurous to produce the Röhr design.

==== Röhr Auto AG ====
The alternative was to produce the car himself. Somehow Röhr persuaded Hugo Greffenius (1876–1954), the principal shareholder in MIAG, to support his plans. Backed by the deep pockets of his new investor, including an immediate cash injection of 500,000 Marks, on 30 October 1926 a new company, Röhr Auto AG, was established. Further funding came from Hirsch & Co., a Frankfurt bank. That same year the new company took over the site hitherto occupied by the insolvent Falcon Automobile Factory in Ober-Ramstadt (near Darmstadt).

It quickly became apparent that the factory space at the Ober-Ramstadt was not suitable for high volume production, so Röhr sent his chief construction engineer Joseph Dauben back to the drawing board to adapt their existing prototype as an eight-cylinder car that could be produced in relatively small quantities. The result was the Röhr 8. The design reflected the experience gained from the prototype vehicles already built, and featured light weight construction using an underslung chassis frame formed from sheet steel. It had, in consequence, an unusually low centre of gravity by the standards of the time. The independent suspension at both ends of the car was also innovative as was the rack and pinion steering. The Röhr 8/40 was much admired for unparalleled driving qualities. One more recent source refers to its "stunning roadability". Deliveries began during the middle part of 1927. Along with the excellent driving characteristics, the car won plaudits for its exceptionally smooth and well-balanced engine. Nevertheless, the eight cylinders had only a combined capacity of 1,980 cc; with a claimed output of just 40 PS (29 kW), the first Röhr 8 was short of power. During 1927 and 1928 fewer than 100 were produced.

In March 1928 the annual German Motor Show returned from Leipzig to Berlin and Röhr took a stand which the company adorned with he slogan Der sicherste Wagen der Welt ("The securest car in the world"). The car itself now appeared with a 2,246 cc engine. Both the bore and the stroke of the combustion chambers in the cylinders had been increased, as had the advertised power output which now stood at 50 PS (37 kW). The claimed maximum speed increased from 90 km/h to 100 km/h. Apart from the enlargement of the engine and a small adjustment to the bottom gear ratio the car was virtually unchanged. Nevertheless, this Röhr 8 9/50 became the company's first commercial success. Between 1928 and 1930 almost 1,000 were produced. Although its exterior was not particularly remarkable, some of the more astute visitors to the 1928 show stand were impressed by the unusual nature of the chassis, and the design also caught the attention of overseas pundits. Others were dismissive of what they saw as a gratuitously gimmicky approach. While some admired the novel configuration of the rear swing-axle, more conservative elements simply complained that the car was missing a "proper" (beam) axle at the back. The car was widely discussed in specialist journals and in the general press. After the 1928 motor show the "Odenwälder Nachrichten" (newspaper) was reporting that the company had finished the show with orders for 2,200 cars. Even if the number was an exaggeration, the exposure at the Berlin show and appearances at other international motor shows over the next couple of years supported a healthy level of demand. In 1929 the Röhr factory at Ober-Ramstadt was employing around 800 people, producing approximately six cars per day.

In October 1930 Röhr Auto AG chose the Paris Motor Show for the launch of their new Röhr 8 10/55. The car was a little longer and a little wider than its predecessor. There were numerous technical improvements and the engine size had been further increased, now to 2,496 cc. In order to avoid having to extend the length of the car excessively, the engine block now used a "narrow V" configuration, with the angles of alternating cylinders differing from one another by just 10°. It was a characteristically innovative solution, but it resulted in a much heavier engine block. Despite further increase in power to a claimed level of 55 PS (40 kW), the claimed maximum speed remained unchanged at 100 km/h (62 mph). Fuel consumption, which had never been stellar in the Röhr 8, was approximately 8% worse than in the previous models (although the fuel tank was approximately 30% larger). However, the car was launched as the backwash from the Wall Street crash surged across Europe. The company had lost its largest financial backer in 1929, when Hugo Greffenius had withdrawn his support, and no equivalent funding could be found from other sources. The listed retail price for the Röhr 8 10/55 was only slightly higher than that for the earlier model, but sales volumes were nevertheless disappointing, with only around 350 cars produced between 1930 and 1933. Through 1930 the earlier Röhr 8 9/50 was still being produced alongside the newer 8 10/55 model: nevertheless, by the end of 1930 bankruptcy could no longer be put off, and early in 1931 production was halted. As matters turned out, that did not mark an end to production at the Ober-Ramstadt factory. With the agreement of creditors, Davos-based "Schweizer Holdinggesellschaft für Automobilwerke" acquired the company's assets at the foreclosure sale in June 1931. The new holding company had been set up for the purpose by Joos Andreas Heintz, Röhr's Swiss importer. Production of the Röhr 8 10/55 resumed. Between 1931 and 1935 the new company, Neue Röhr-Werke AG produced approximately another 2,000 more cars. However, they did so without Hans Gustav Röhr and Joseph Dauben.

==== Adlerwerke AG ====
In or shortly before May 1931 Hans Gustav Röhr joined Adlerwerke AG in Frankfurt as Head of Product Development ("Chefkonstrukteur"), Technical Director and a deputy member of the board. Adler was a financially challenged but still significant – and, after Röhr joined the company, innovative – motor manufacturer which in terms of unit sales ranked fourth (behind Opel, DKW and Mercedes-Benz) in the German auto-market through most of the 1930s. With him came Dauben and the "hard-core" of their technical team, notably Otto Winkelmann, Walter Kurtze und Laurenz Niessen.

Adler had come through the 1920s as a manufacture of large traditionally designed cars, consciously inspired by North American manufacturers to be simple and inexpensive to produce. The Adler Standard 6 had become a favourite with the German upper middle class and with those taxi operators who thought the similarly sized offerings from Mercedes-Benz slightly over-specified and over-priced. However, Adlerwerke AG had also suffered from the ill-effects of the economic crash which had triggered the financial collapse of Röhr Auto AG, and by 1931, when Röhr and his team arrived, management had taken a decision to expand the range down-market, which effectively meant competing directly against both the financial might of Opel and the technical inventiveness of DKW. At Adler a team under the direction of Dr. Ing. E.h. Otto Göckeritz and his engineer Gotthilf Henzler were directed to develop what would emerge in 1932 as the 1.5 litre Adler Primus. Their design was in most respect a scaled down version of the company's existing 2.0 litre Favorit, which itself had been launched, in 1929, as a scaled down version of the full-size Adler Standard 6. The challenge presented to Hans Gustav Röhr and his team was to develop a 1.5 litre car of their own which would compete directly with the car produced by the Göckeritz team, but would also incorporate some of the innovations with which Röhr had built his reputation when an independent manufacturer. Even more courageously, Röhr's brief involved designing a front-wheel drive car, following the trend set by the recently presented DKW F1 and Stoewer V 5. Despite the requirement that the Röhr car should feature innovative engineering solutions, there was an over-riding requirement to control costs. This meant that as far as possible the two designs should share their principal components. When, in March 1932, Otto Göckeritz's Adler Primus and Hans Gustav Röhr's Adler Trumpf were presented at the Geneva Motor Show, they came with the same 1504 cc 4-cylinder engine. The water pump and electrical components were identical. But the Adler Trumpf incorporated front-wheel drive. Despite that, it was a little lighter and a little quicker thanks to the light-weight chassis construction and relatively advanced suspension and steering systems. It may have been a reflection of the lower weight, or of the desperate need to price the car competitively, that the Trumpf also came with cable operated brakes whereas the otherwise relatively "traditional" Primus had hydraulic braking.

It was the technically more advanced Trumpf that won plaudits from the experts and enthusiasts. No one seemed to mind that the front-wheel drive system appeared to have been shamelessly copied from the DKW F1 and the Stoewer V 5. The DKW was small and (deceptively) simple to look at, while Stoewer was a fringe manufacturer producing only between 1,000 and 2,000 cars per year. Hans Gustav Röhr and Joseph Dauben found themselves acknowledged as experts on front-wheel drive both in Germany and internationally. According to at least one source even André Citroën, the man who had introduced assembly-line manufacturing to Europe (and especially to Opel), seriously considered assembling the Adler Trumpf under licence in Paris, before selecting the (financially more perilous) option of creating his own front-wheel drive model. Despite the Primus and Trumpf being presented in public together in March 1932, it was only the Primus that was production-ready at that point. When the factory re-opened after the 1932 summer holiday shut-down, however, volume production of the Trumpf also began. Both the Trumpf and the Primus were commercially successful, justifying the manufacturer's decision to extend its range down-market to include small family cars, and enabling Adler to leapfrog Mercedes-Benz and, at least in terms of unit sales, achieve third place in the sales charts in 1934 and again in 1935.

Once production of both models got into full swing the Trumpf comfortably outsold the Primus, with 18,600 Trumpfs produced between 1932 and 1936, as against a unit production volume for the Primus during the same four years of just 6,713. By the end of the decade more than 25,000 Trumpfs had been built. That was despite the fact that in the traditionally price-conscious German market the advertised price of the Trumpf was generally around 200 Marks higher than for the Primus. Adler remained a major force in the German car market during the 1930s, and throughout that decade the architecture and mechanical underpinnings of their cars continued to carry the unmistakable "signature" of Hans Gustav Röhr, Joseph Dauben and their remarkable technical team.

The Adler Trumpf was followed by all new versions of the Adler Favorit and the Adler Standard, launched at the Berlin Motor Show in February 1933. The cars anticipated European styling trends of the late 1930s, being lower and, with a new all-steel body by Ambi-Budd of Berlin, sleeker than their predecessors: these suddenly looked curiously perpendicular by comparison. Attention focused on the new ZF four speed transmission, the independent suspension and the underslung chassis configuration which facilitated the lower stance of the body. Although for Röhr and his team some of these features may no longer have seemed so innovative as they had when he had pioneered them ten years earlier, they did set Adler apart from the more cautious/conservative approach to car design that continued to be apparent in the mainstream models produced by Opel and Mercedes-Benz during the first half of the decade. The new Favorit and Standard shared the same wheelbase and bodywork, being differentiated from one another chiefly through their engine sizes. The Favorit came with a four-cylinder, 1,943 cc unit while the Standard 6 was powered by 6-cylinder unit of 2,916 cc (the cylinder dimensions were identical). When an 8-cylinder Standard 8 appeared a year later the wheelbase was extended by just over 12 cm to accommodate the longer engine. Commercially the new Favorit failed to take the market by storm and was withdrawn after a year, but the 6-cylinder Standard continued to sell in respectable numbers, with further improvements and a name change along the way, till 1940.

During the first part of 1934 Adler began production of the Adler Trumpf Junior, which was in many ways the most important of the Adlers developed by Röhr and Dauben. With more than 100,000 sold, it was the top selling Adler of the 1930s. Conceptually it was the most modern of Röhr's Adlers, with front wheel drive and independent front suspension using two overlapping transversely mounted leaf springs. The rear suspension was also inventively thought through. The rack and pinion steering was in effect the system originally used for the 1927 Röhr 8. The characteristic Röhr underslung chassis permitted a low centre of gravity and above-average road holding and, while giving the car a far more modern and dynamic look than the new competitor offering from Opel which also appeared in 1934. Nevertheless, it is apparent that the Trumpf Junior was developed under acute time pressure. There being no engine from existing models that could be adapted to fit under the bonnet/hood, and no time to design a small compact engine, the team looked around for a modern engine and reverse engineered it, thereby effectively copying the engine from the widely admired Fiat Balilla. Nor was the engine the only element for which the design was in effect copied from the competition.

In 1934 Röhr persuaded the Adler board to take over the Frankfurt-based aircraft manufacturer Flugzeugbau Max Gerner. There followed a brief but intense period of investment in aircraft production capacity. After a few Adler-Gerner biplanes had been constructed the affair proved to be a financial disaster (for Adler), however. By the middle of 1935 Adler had withdrawn from the Gerner project. Röhr's Relations with Adler were further damaged after the company entered into agreements with Impéria and Rosengart under which the Trumpf and Trumpf Junior were to be produced in Belgium and France. The agreements were between the companies involved. Röhr, who had been excluded from them, believed that he should be entitled to a share in the royalties due. Management disagreed and the "Röhr team" left the company. Röhr's successor was another brilliant engineer, Karl Jenschke from Austria who November 1935 arrived at Adler from the Steyr-Werke AG in Austria.

==== Daimler-Benz AG ====
Hans Gustav Röhr and Joseph Dauben now joined Daimler-Benz at Sindelfingen, again "as a team". Röhr was appointed "Technical Director" in succession to Hans Nibel who had died following a heart attack in November 1934. The appointment was made at the instigation of Emil Georg von Stauss, a banker who had by this time become chairman of the company's supervisory board. The position urgently needed filling and Röhr brought to it his considerable reputation and experience, but he was nevertheless seen as something of an outsider by the company board, under the chairmanship of Wilhelm Kissel (who back in 1928/29 had already seen off an earlier brilliant Technical Director, Ferdinand Porsche). Röhr was short of academic qualifications and still only 40, which counted against him with his venerable fellow board members at Daimler-Benz. His insistence on bringing his team with him from outside, and his willingness to question articles of faith on matters such as the way a Mercedes-Benz had its rear suspension arranged, again failed to endear him to senior colleagues. Daimler-Benz was also a highly politicised company. Since 1933 Germany had become a dictatorship with strange and – as was by now becoming increasingly apparent – murderously demented ideas on race. There was no suggestion that Hans Gustav Röhr might be Jewish; but he had nevertheless married a French wife which in Hitler's Germany could readily be questioned as unpatriotic. Care was taken when drafting employment contracts for Röhr and Dauben that they should be denied access to any military projects in which the company might be involved.

Between 1935 and 1937 Röhr and his team worked intensively on developing various front wheel drive designs for Daimler Benz with 4, 6 and even 8 cylinder engines. Several of the W144 prototypes were completed. They featured independently suspended wheels and in some cases weight-saving monocoque steel bodies. Most German automakers had responded to the introduction of all-steel car bodies a few years earlier by entering into a contract with the Berlin-based specialised steel-body maker, Ambi Budd. Daimler Benz were unusual among German auto-makers in having insisted, from the outset, on including their own car-bodybuilding facilities as part of their own plant. That put them in a strong position to pioneer monocoque car bodies in Europe. However, Daimler Benz had become in many ways a technically conservative company by this time. Somehow failed Röhr failed to communicate the merits of his advanced designs to management colleagues, and it would take another sixty years before the company would introduce a front-wheel drive Mercedes passenger car to its customers. Back in the late 1930s it was left to Opel to demonstrate the cost saving potential of using monocoque bodies for mainstream automobiles. The board decision not to progress his designs to production, taken in 1936, was a hard blow for Röhr, reflecting his continuing position as an outsider and, some have argued, a certain personal inflexibility. By 1937 it seems to have been mutually accepted that in due course he would be leaving the company.

However, on 10 August 1937, Hans Gustav Röhr died unexpectedly, still aged only 42. He had been driving an open-topped car to the Nürburgring and then suffered from a fatal pneumonia. Elsewhere it is stated that the cause of his death was a viral infection. At Daimler Benz his front-wheel drive designs and the W144 engine/transmission package that went with one of them were very quickly forgotten. Josef Dauben remained with the company, working on development of the high-powered V-12 engines that were used to power search-light generators during the war years.
