= Adler Trumpf =

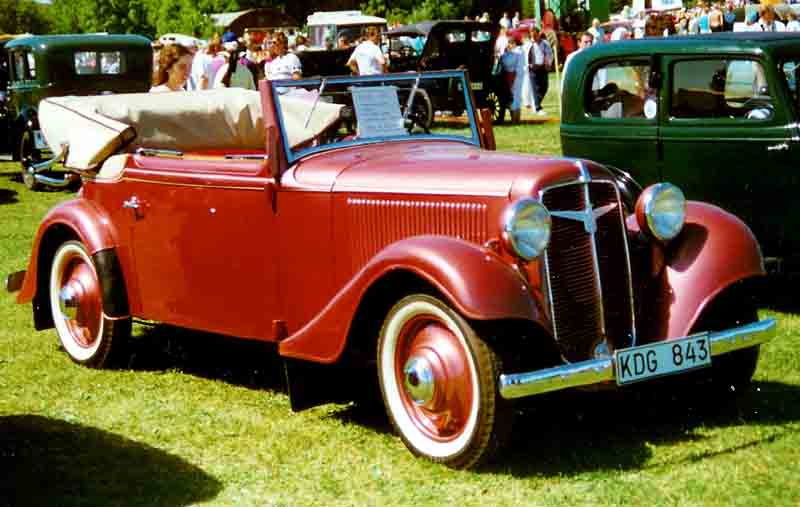
- Adler Trumpf Cabriolet (1935)

Overview
- Manufacturer: Adlerwerke
- Also called: 1932–34: Adler Trumpf 1.5 Liter; 1933–36: Adler Trumpf 1.7 Liter; 1933–35: Adler Trumpf Sport 1936–38: Adler Trumpf 1.7 EV
- Production: 1932–36: 18,600 units 1936–38: 7,003 units
- Assembly: Frankfurt am Main
- Designer: Hans Gustav Röhr

Body and chassis
- Body style: “Limousine” (2/4 door Saloon); 2/4 door Cabriolet; Sports Roadster
- Layout: FF layout

Powertrain
- Engine: 1932-34: 1,504 cc 4 cylinder in-line side-valve engine 1933-38: 1,645 cc 4 cylinder in-line side-valve engine
- Transmission: 4-speed manual. No synchromesh.

Dimensions
- Wheelbase: 1932-35: 2,825 mm (111.2 in); 1936-38: 2,920 mm (115.0 in)
- Length: 1932-36: 4,150 mm (163.4 in); 1936-38: 4,540 mm (178.7 in)
- Width: 1,600 mm (63.0 in)
- Height: 1,580 mm (62.2 in); 1,550 mm (61.0 in) (Sport)

The Adler Trumpf is a small family car introduced by the Frankfurt based auto-maker, Adler in March 1932, with Trumpf production fully starting in the late summer that year. Adler launched two similarly sized cars in the same year, one of which followed the 1931 DKW F1's then innovative front-wheel drive layout, and the other model using the conventional rear-wheel drive configuration still used by then market leader, Opel's 1.2 litre 'model 6'.

The Trumpf was the second of these two smaller Adlers to enter volume production, at the end of the summer in 1932, and was the front wheel drive offering. The design was the responsibility of Hans Gustav Röhr (1895 – 1937). The Trumpf was distinguished from its more conservatively configured Primus sibling both by its front wheel drive and by its relatively advanced independent suspension.

== Engine ==
At launch, the car was offered with a four cylinder 1,504 cc engine, which had a claimed maximum power output of 32 PS (24 kW; 32 hp) at 3,500 rpm. Top speed was given as 95 km/h (59 mph). Although the engine block was the same one as that used on the Primus, in the Trumpf it was turned around by 180 degrees and installed in a block with the gearbox directly behind the front axle. The extra space needed for this arrangement gave rise to a car that was 150 mm (5.9 in) longer, both in respect of the wheelbase and of the car, than the otherwise, at this point, very similar Primus.

Transmission of power to the front wheels was via a four speed manual transmission without synchromesh. Whereas the transmission on the rear wheel drive Primus was controlled using a floor mounted lever, gear changing on the front-wheel drive Trumpf was achieved using a column mounted lever.

== Bodies ==
The two standard all-steel bodies were provided by Ambi-Budd of Berlin. Trumpf customers in 1932 could choose between a two door “Limousine” (saloon/sedan) and a cabriolet. Both sat on a 2,825 mm (111.2 in) wheelbase, and had an overall body length of 4,150 mm (163 in). The manufacturer’s recommended price was 3,750 Marks for the sedan/saloon and 4,500 for the cabriolet which was competitive, though the price for the Trumpf was slightly higher than that for the Primus.

At the front, the radiator was installed behind a grille, which differentiated the Trumpf from the Primus which, for its first year of production, had no grille over the radiator.

== 1933 Adler Trumpf range extension ==
1933 was the year in which an optional 1,645 cc engine became available on the Trumpf (as on the Primus), offering 38 PS (28 kW; 37 hp) of claimed maximum power at 3,800 rpm and a 100 km/h (63 mph) top speed. Ambi-Budd now came up with a more modern steel body for the Trumpf which now had its windscreen slightly raked and its front doors hinged at the back to facilitate getting in and out. The body was now available as a two or four door “Limousine” (saloon/sedan) and acquired a name of its own. Ambi-Budd bodied Adler Trumpf Limousines were known between 1934 and 1936 as “Jupiter” bodied cars. Cabriolet bodied cars and an open topped “Sport 2 seater” also became available in 1934

== Commercial ==
The Adler Trumpf was offered with its 1,504 cc engine until 1934, and with its 1,645 cc engine until May 1936. In that time 18,600 of the cars were produced, equivalent to a market share of between 3 and 4% in a German auto-market much more fragmented than it would become two or three decades later. Together (after 1934) with the smaller Adler Trumpf Junior, the Adler Trumpf was therefore key to maintaining Adler’s number 3 or 4 position in terms of overall German passenger car sales between 1932 and 1936.

== 1936 Adler Trumpf 1.7 EV ==
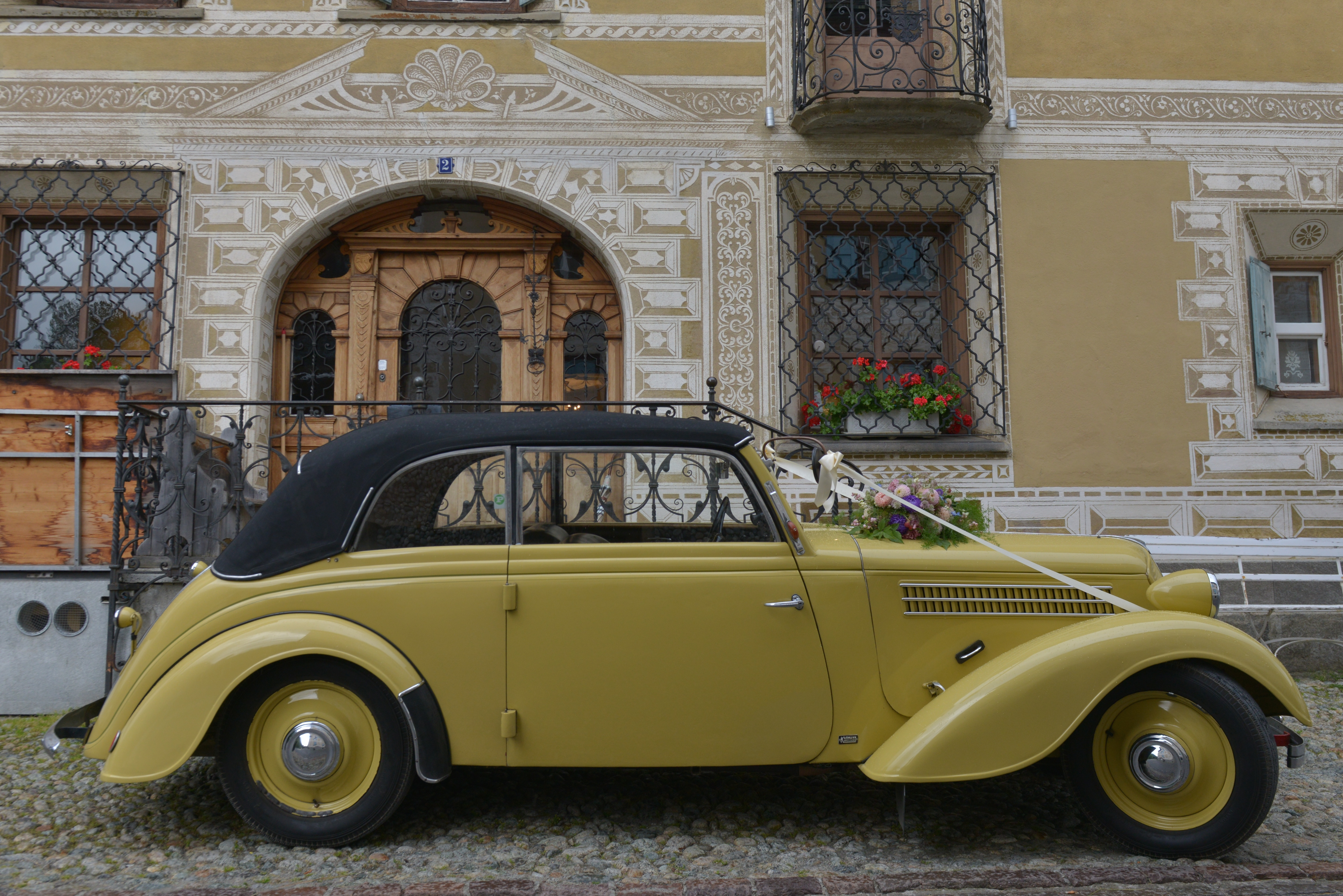
Adler Trumpf 1.7 EV Karmann Body; 1936

The Trumpf 1.7 was replaced directly in May 1936 with the Adler Trumpf 1.7 EV. It came with the same 1,645 cc engine as before, for which 38 PS (28 kW; 37 hp) of maximum power was claimed. The 2,920 mm (115 in) wheel base was 220 mm (8.7 in) longer than before and the body, more streamlined than before and with a longer rear overhang, was now 4,540 mm (179 in) (390 mm (15 in) longer than before ). As before, the body for the standard “Limousine” (sedan/saloon) came from the steel car body specialists Ambi-Budd of Berlin, now featuring four doors and a “six light” construction. Customers wishing for a two-door Adler “Limousine” of this class would need to await the launch in 1937 of the two-door Primus. The standard cabriolet bodies for the Trumpf 1.7 EV came from Karmann of Osnabrück. The claimed maximum speed was now increased to 102 km/h (63 mph).

The 1936 Trumpf 1.7 E, was priced at 4,400 Marks, which in 1937 was reduced to 4,100 Marks. The competition may have been hotting up for Adler whose market position slipped to fifth in 1938, overtaken by Ford whose own output volume almost doubled between 1936 and 1938. In just under two years, following its launch in May 1936, Adler produced 7,003 of their 1.7Es, equivalent to a little below 2% of the total German passenger car market.
