= DKW F5 =

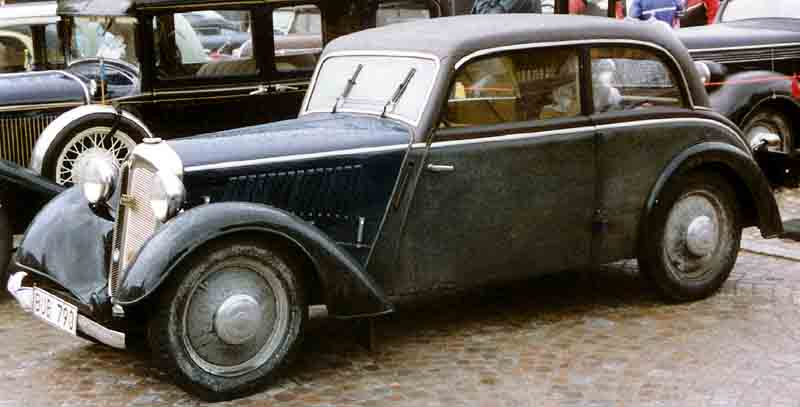

Overview
- Manufacturer: Auto Union AG
- Also called: Reichsklasse; Meisterklasse
- Production: 1935–1936
- Assembly: Germany: Zwickau

Body and chassis
- Layout: FF layout

Powertrain
- Engine: 584 cc & 692 cc two-stroke I2
- Transmission: 3-speed manual

Dimensions
- Wheelbase: 2,610 mm (102.8 in)
- Length: 3,750 mm (147.6 in)
- Width: 1,430 mm (56.3 in)
- Height: 1,480 mm (58.3 in)
- Curb weight: 700 kg (1,543 lb)

Chronology
- Predecessor: DKW F2; DKW F4
- Successor: DKW F7

The DKW F5 is a small, front-wheel drive saloon produced by Auto Union's DKW division from 1935 to 1936, as a replacement for the DKWs F4 (Meisterklasse) and F2 (Reichsklasse) models.

== The body ==
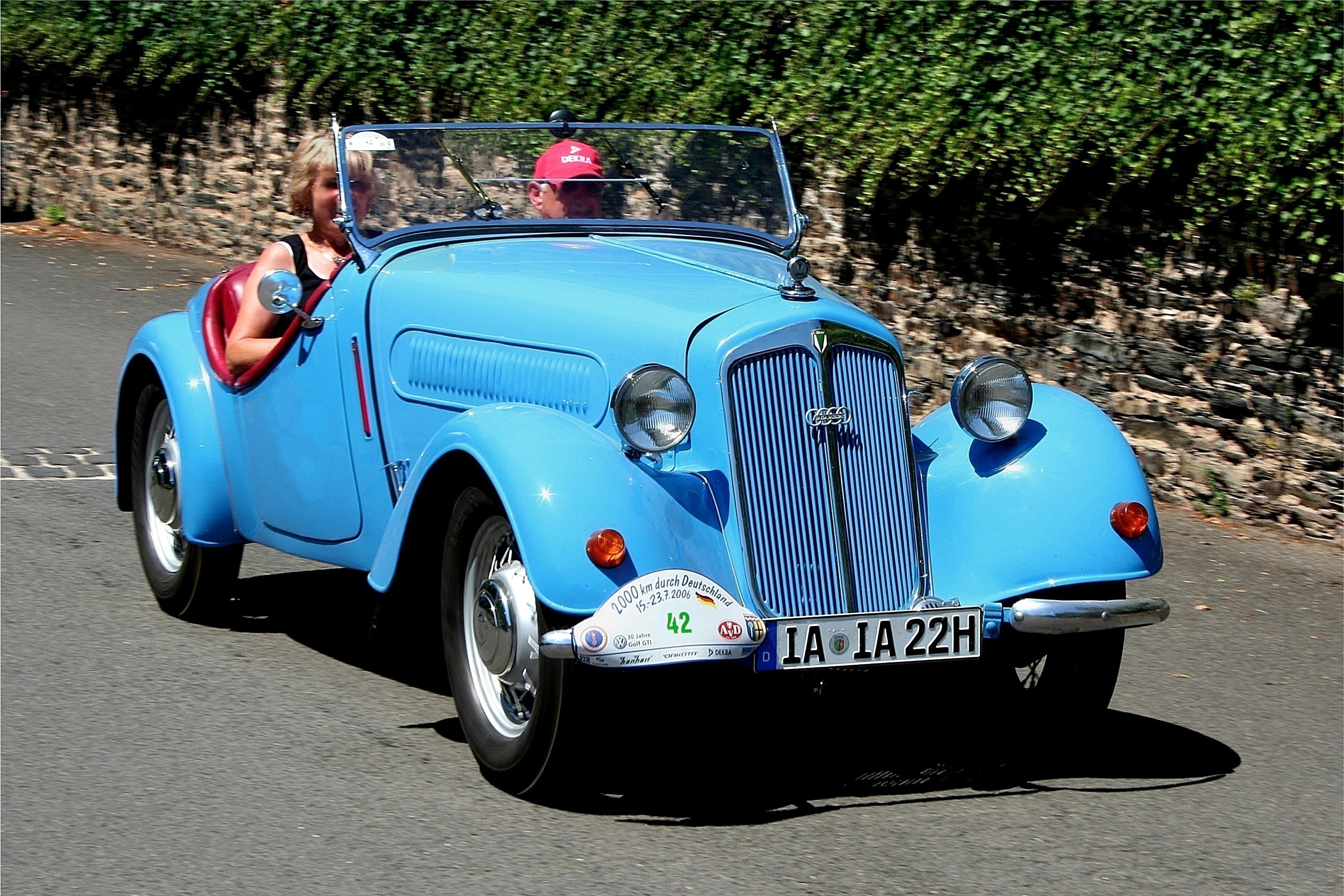
DKW F5 Roadster (1938)

The appearance of the F5 was little changed from those of the F2 and F4. However, the timber-frame construction of the central portion of the body was, in the F5, replaced with a steel frame. The outer skin of the body remained of fabric construction, with plywood support.

There were two broadly similar F5 saloons, sold as the Reichsklasse and Meisterklasse. They shared the same track and wheelbase, but the Meisterklasse was 3.5 cm longer. There were also two-seater cabriolet versions of each, along with a lighter bodied ‘Front Luxus Sport’ sports cabriolet for which a higher top speed of 90 km/h (56 mph) was claimed.

== Engine and running gear ==
The cars had the two-cylinder two-stroke engines of their predecessors. The Meisterklasse 692 cc and 584 cc engine had an output of 20 hp. Respective claimed top speeds were 80 and 85 km/h (50 and 53 mph).

DKW had been producing small front wheel drive sedans since 1931. The incorporation of front wheel drive in the F5 was at this time still strikingly innovative in terms of the wider auto market, however.

The car featured a three-speed manual transmission system.

== Commercial ==
Production of the F5 saloon ended in 1936 while production of the 20 bhp (15 kW) cabriolet versions continued for a further year. The car was replaced by the DKW F7. By the time that happened, approximately 60,000 F5s had been produced, placing this car among Germany's top sellers.

== Data ==
Technical data DKW F5 (Manufacturer's figures except where stated)
DKW F5	’Reichsklasse’	’Meisterklasse’	’Front’ Cabriolet	’Front Luxus’ Cabriolet	’Front Luxus Sport’
Body	2-door saloon	2-door saloon	2-seater cabriolet	2-seater cabriolet	2-seater roadster
Produced:	1935–1936	1935–1936	1936	1936–1937	1936–1937
Engine:	Two-stroke 2-cylinder water-cooled, front-mounted				
Displacement:	584 cc	692 cc	584 cc	692 cc	692 cc
Bore x stroke:	74 x 68	76 x 76	74 x 68	76 x 76	76 x 76
Max. power :	18 PS (13.2 kW)	20 PS (14.7 kW)	18 PS (13.2 kW)	20 PS (14.7 kW)	
Electrical system:	6 volt				
Max. speed :	80 km/h (50 mph)	85 km/h (53 mph)	80 km/h (50 mph)	85 km/h (53 mph)	90 km/h (56 mph)
Dry weight:	700 kg (1,543 lb)	770 kg (1,698 lb)	650 kg (1,433 lb)	790–820 kg (1,742–1,808 lb)	700 kg (1,543 lb)
Track, front/rear:	1,110 / 1,220 mm (43.7 / 48.0 in)				
Wheelbase:	2,610 mm (103 in)	2,610 mm (103 in)	2,400 mm (94 in)	2,610 mm (103 in)	2,500 mm (98 in)
Length:	3,750 mm (147.6 in)	3,985 mm (156.9 in)	3,450 mm (135.8 in)	3,995 mm (157.3 in)	3,745 mm (147.4 in)
Width:	1,430 mm (56 in)	1,465 mm (57.7 in)	1,450 mm (57 in)	1,480 mm (58 in)	1,440 mm (57 in)
Height:	1,480 mm (58 in)	1,500 mm (59 in)	1,440 mm (57 in)	1,440 mm (57 in)	1,410 mm (56 in)
