= DKW F4 =

DKW F4 Meisterklasse
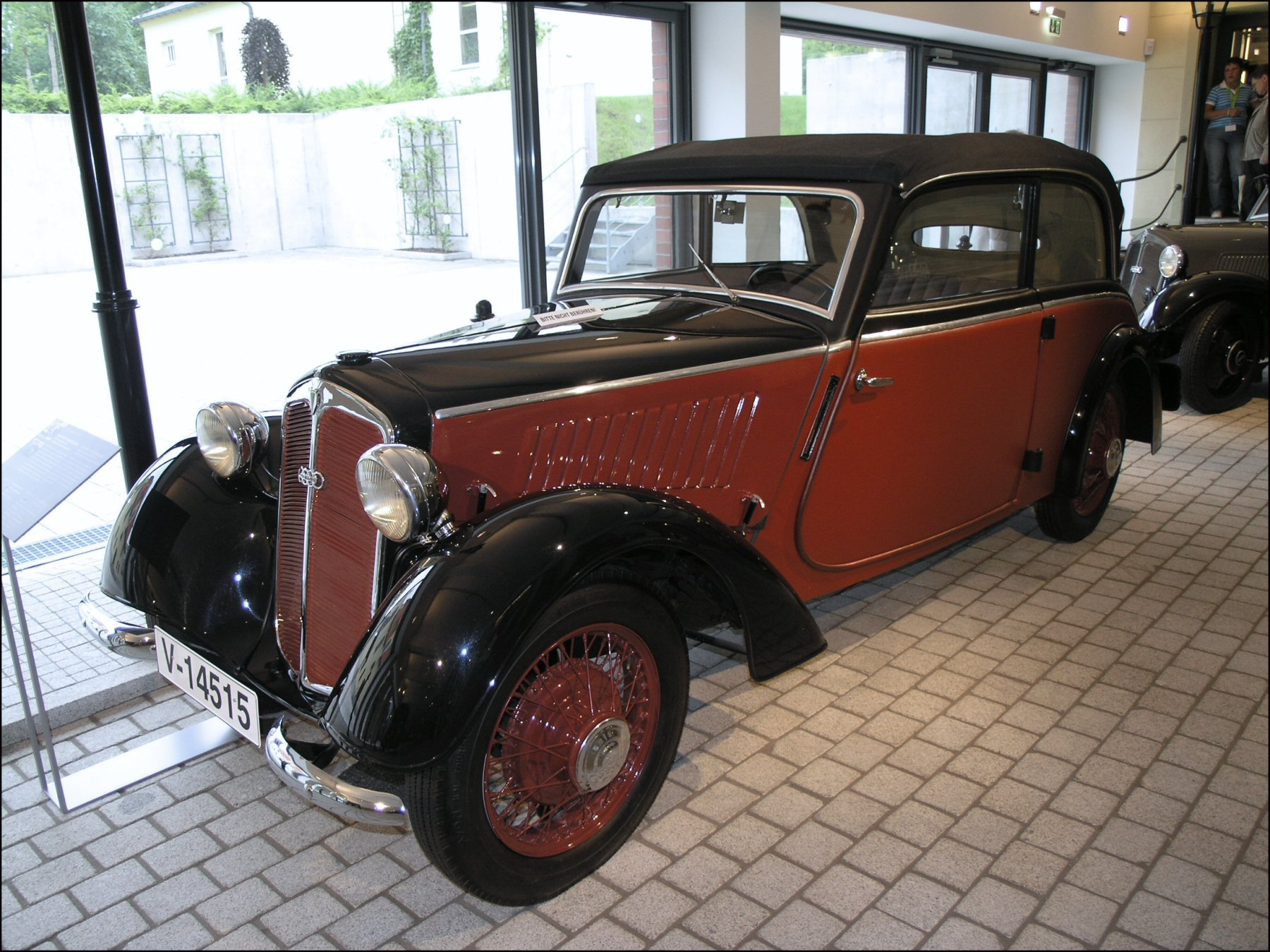
- DKW F4 Meisterklasse 2-door cabrio-limousine

Overview
- Manufacturer: DKW (Auto Union)
- Production: 1934–1935; Approx 7,000 units
- Assembly: Germany: Zwickau

Body and chassis
- Body style: 2 door, 4 seater ”limousine” (saloon); 2 door 4 seater “cabrio-limousine” (soft top saloon/sedan)
- Layout: FF layout

Powertrain
- Engine: 692 cc two stroke I2
- Transmission: 3-speed manual

Dimensions
- Wheelbase: 2,610 mm (103 in)
- Length: 3,985 mm (156.9 in)
- Width: 1,465 mm (57.7 in)
- Height: 1,500 mm (59 in)

Chronology
- Predecessor: DKW F2
- Successor: DKW F5

The DKW F4 Meisterklasse is a small car produced at the company’s Zwickau plant by DKW (part of the Auto Union) between 1934 and 1935. It shared its 692cc engine and front wheel drive configuration with its immediate predecessor, the DKW F2 Meisterklasse, along with its 2,610 mm (103 in) wheelbase, but the body had been restyled again, and was now more stylish, the perpendicular rear end of the F2 now replaced with a sloping rear on the mainstream body types

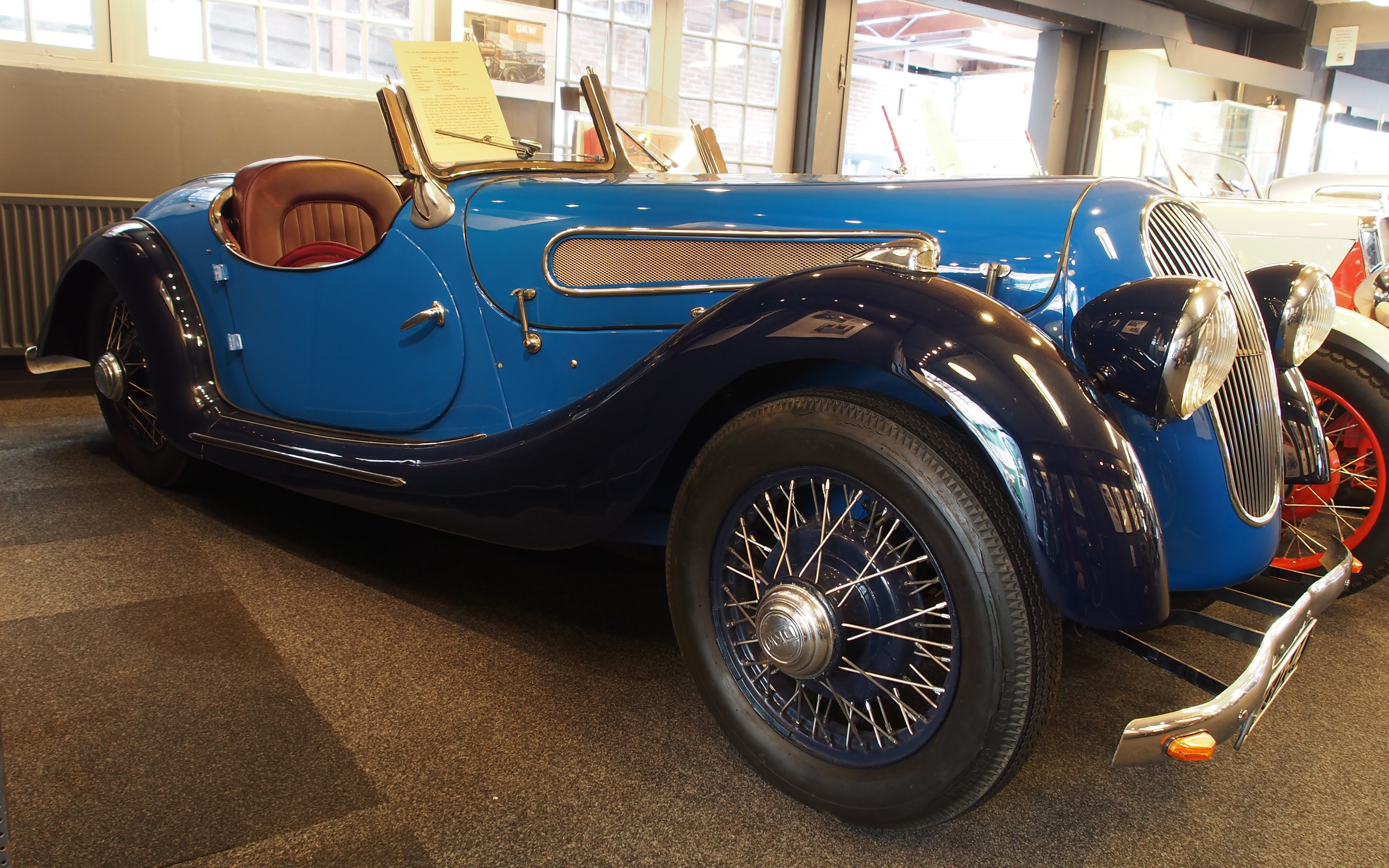
1934 DKW F4 with a roadster body by IHLE

The engine was again a 2- cylinder 2-stroke in-line 692cc unit producing a claimed maximum output of 15 kW (20 PS) at 3,500 rpm. Power was sent to the front wheels through a three speed manual gear box which was also carried over from the previous model, the gear ratios still unchanged from the days of the DKW F1. However, the F2 Meisterklasse, during its final year of production, had acquired a lockable freewheel device incorporated within its transmission, and this feature was carried forward to the F4 Meisterklasse.

The self-supporting body was again supported by a U-profile plywood subframe. Available body types were a 2 door 4 seater ”limousine” (saloon) and a 2 door 4 seater “cabrio-limousine” (soft top saloon/sedan) with a retractable top but fixed windows. In addition to its more stylish rear end, the F4 body was also distinguished by the switch to rear hinged doors for easier access and egress.

Although the F4 Meisterklasse replaced the F2 Meisterklasse, the smaller engined DKW F2 Reichsklasse continued to be manufactured alongside the F4. In 1935 both models were replaced by the DKW F5 which would from its inception be offered in both 584cc Reichsklasse and 692cc Meisterklasse versions.

== Sources and further reading ==
This entry incorporates information from the German Wikipedia DKW F4 article.
