= Wendler (coachbuilder) =

German coachbuilding company

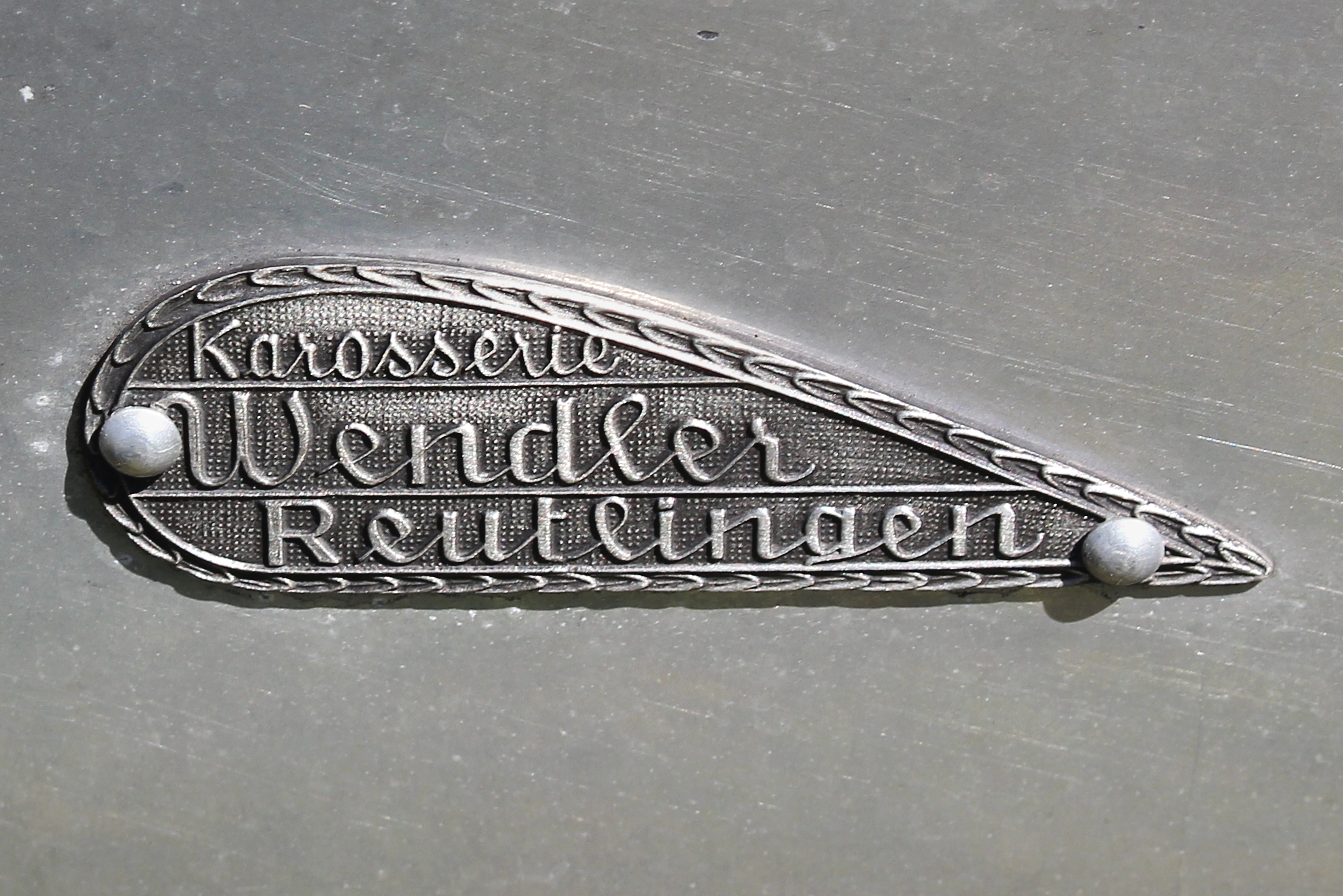
Karosserie Wendler logo

Wendler was a German wheelwright and car body manufacturer in Reutlingen.

== History ==
The company was opened by Erhard Wendler in 1840 as a carriage factory. Initially, he manufactured carriages, and from the early 1920s, car bodies as well. The designer Helmut Schwandner initiated the reorientation. In the 1920s, around 60 bodies were built, and in the 1930s there were 250 to 270. The workforce consisted of around 100 employees. One of the customers in 1937 was the architect Wilhelm Ritter von Graf.

After the Second World War, Wendler resumed the production of car bodies, which were now built in the ponton shape. Series production continued until the end of the 1950s, then the focus shifted mainly to repairs.

One of Wendler's most important clients was Porsche, who, among other things, had Wendler build 90 light-alloy bodies (according to other sources, more than 100) for the Porsche 550. For the 1961 24 Hours of Le Mans, Wendler designed a Porsche coupé, but it was never built. Instead, he developed his own car based on a Porsche, the W-RS 001.

Later, the company was involved in vintage car restoration and special construction of armored limousines.

In 2000, Wendler became insolvent. The company continued to operate under the name Pgam AG until its final closure.

== Gallery ==
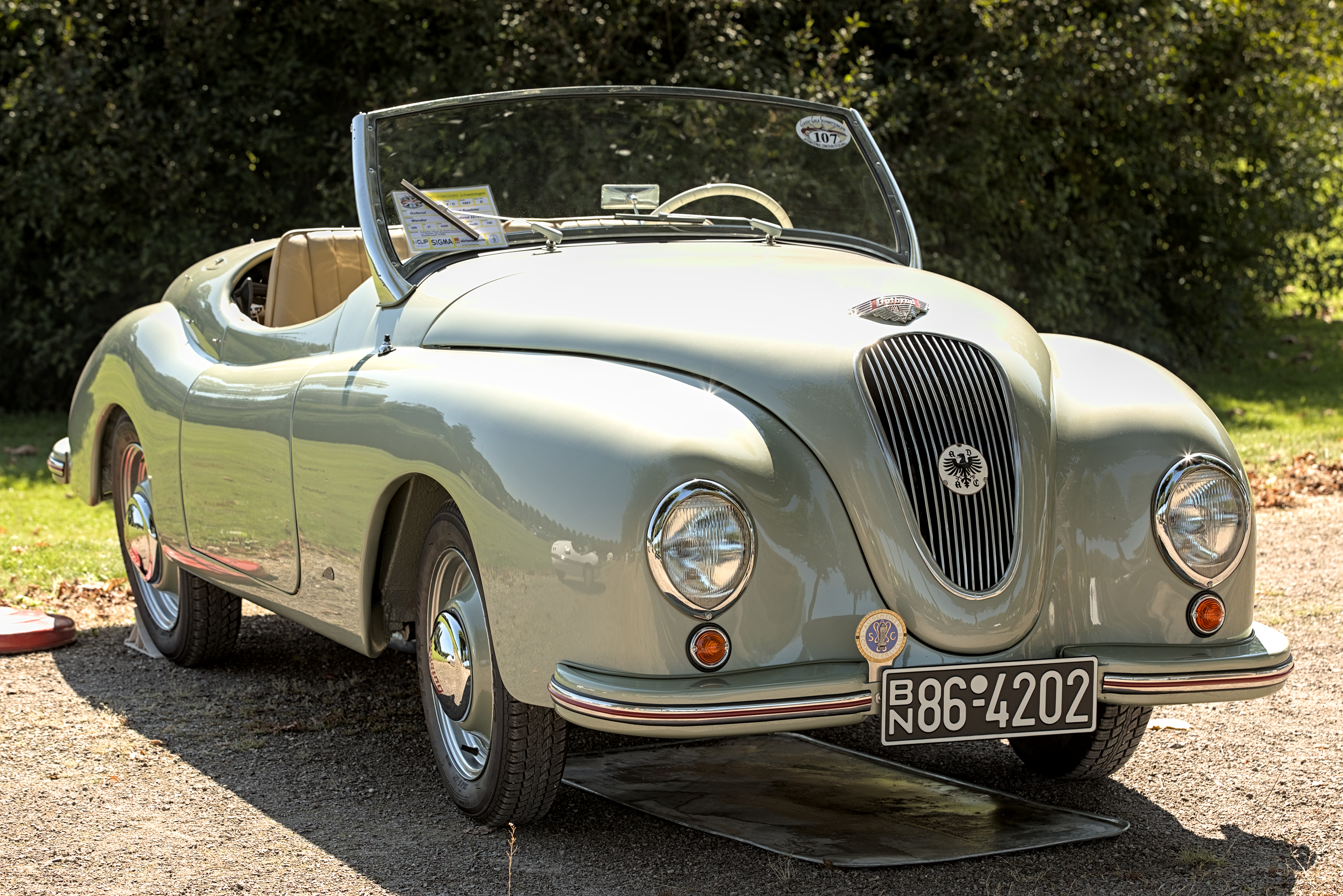
Gutbrod Superior with a body by Wendler (1951)

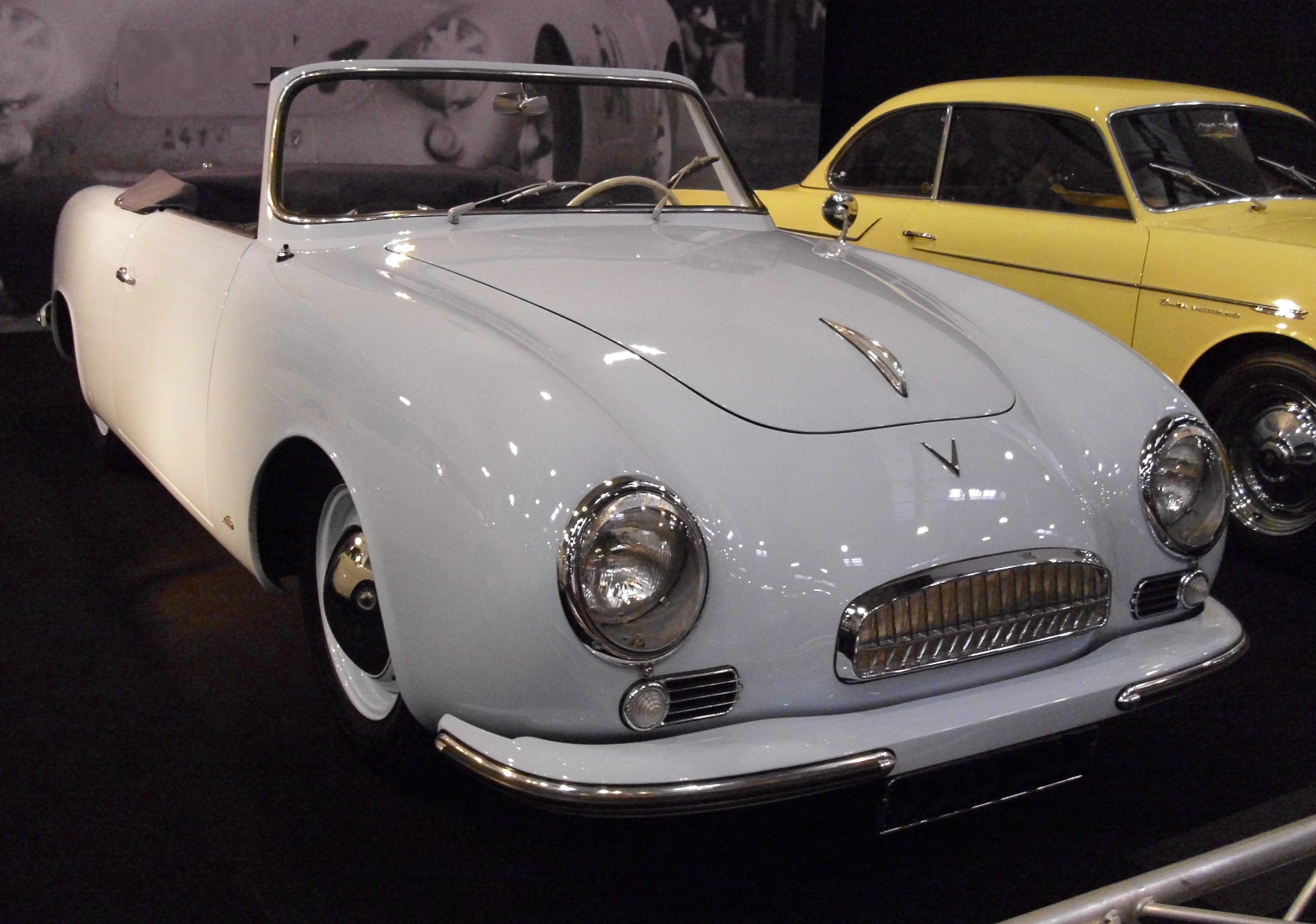
Cabriolet based on a Volkswagen and bodied by Wendler (1957)

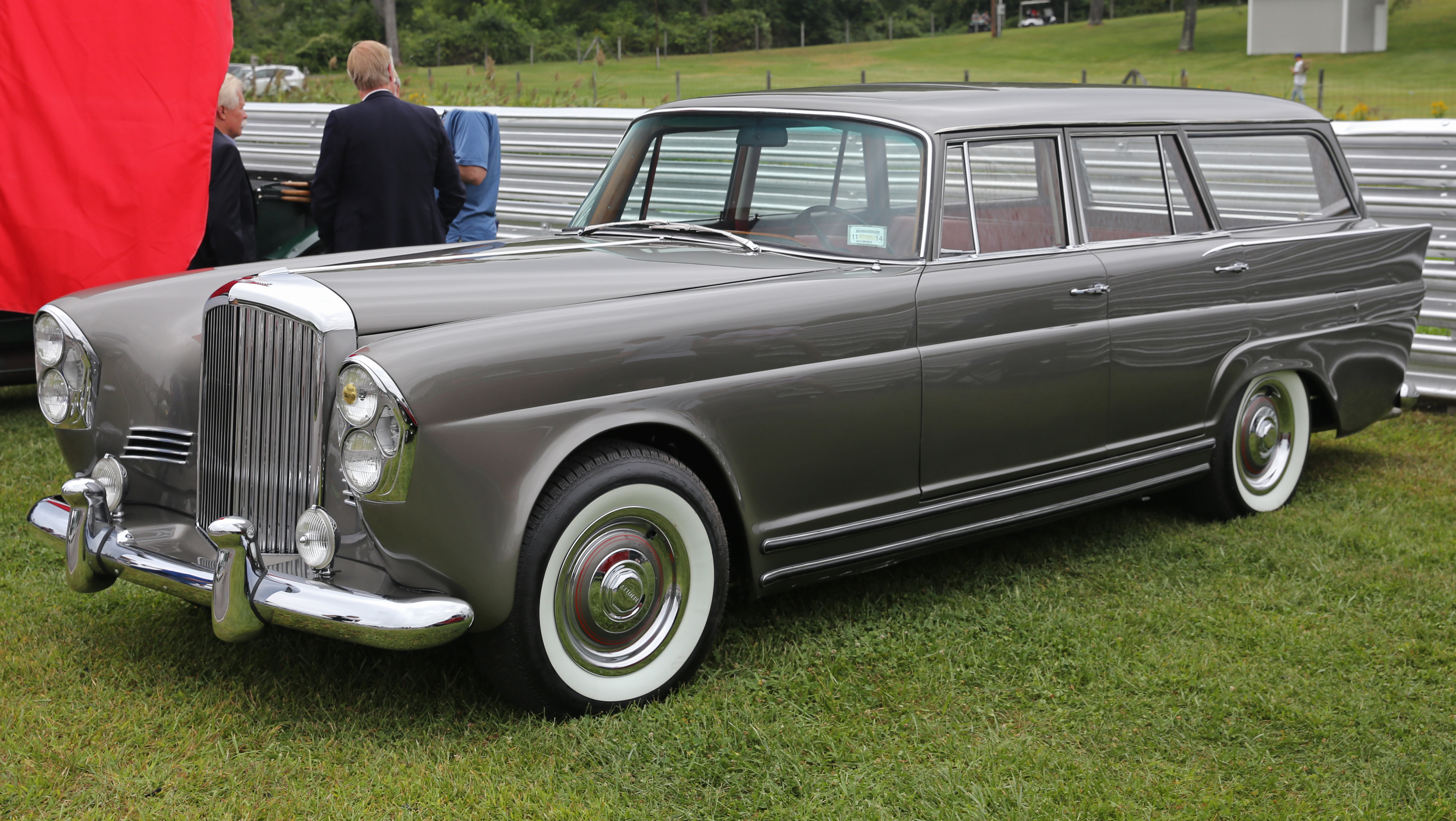
1960 Bentley S2 with shooting brake bodywork by Wendler

== Literature ==
- Ralf J. F. Kieselbach, ed. (1982), "Karosserien nach Maß, Erhardt Wendler, 1923 bis 1963", Kohlhammer-Edition Auto & Verkehr, ISBN 3-17-007625-6
- Werner Oswald (2005), Deutsche Autos Band 2 - 1920–1945, Stuttgart: Motorbuch Verlag, ISBN 3-613-02170-6
