= DKW F2 =

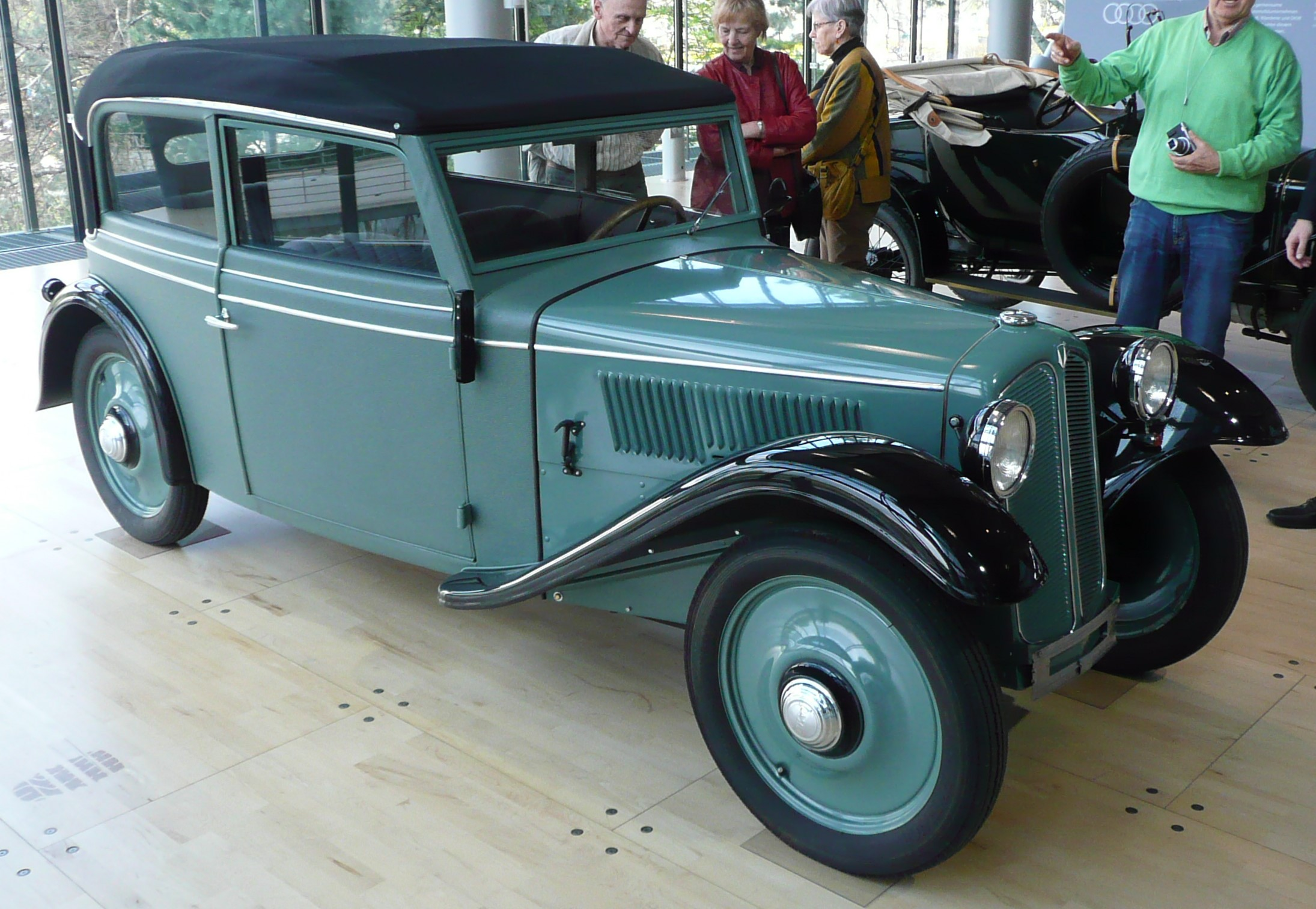

Overview
- Manufacturer: DKW (Auto Union)
- Also called: DKW Meisterklasse 601; DKW Meisterklasse 701; DKW Reichsklasse
- Production: 1932–1934 (Meisterklasse); 1933–1935 (Reichsklasse); Approx 17,000 units
- Assembly: Germany: Zwickau

Body and chassis
- Body style: 2 door, 4 seater ”limousine” (saloon); 2 door 4 seater “cabrio-limousine” (soft top saloon/sedan)
- Layout: FF layout

Powertrain
- Engine: 584 cc & 692 cc two stroke I2
- Transmission: 3-speed manual

Dimensions
- Wheelbase: 2,610 mm (103 in)
- Length: 3,895 mm (153.3 in) (Reichsklasse); 3,955 mm (155.7 in) (Meisterklasse); 3,750 mm (148 in) (2-seater Meisterklasse)
- Width: 1,480 mm (58 in)
- Height: 1,500 mm (59 in)

Chronology
- Predecessor: DKW F1
- Successor: DKW F4

The DKW F2, firstly marketed as "DKW Meisterklasse", is a front wheel drive economy car produced by Auto Union's DKW division from 1932 to 1935 at the company’s Zwickau plant. It was launched at the Berlin Motor Show in April 1932. It shared its 584cc engine and drivetrain with its DKW F1 predecessor, but offered a longer wheelbase and a larger body.

Although the DKWs offered a fully enclosed body on a relatively advanced chassis with four wheel independent suspension, they used two-stroke motorcycle derived engines, and cheap, lightweight bodies of timber, clad in artificial leather, like the F1.

Known within the company and in retrospect as the DKW F2, this was the first of several successive small DKWs cars to be marketed using the name, “DKW Meisterklasse”.

== Engine and transmission ==
The car came with the 584cc 2-stroke 2-cylinder engine of the early DKW F1, initially still producing a claimed maximum power output of 11 kW (15 PS) at 3500 rpm. The power is sent to the front wheels via a 3-speed manual transmission.

== Body ==
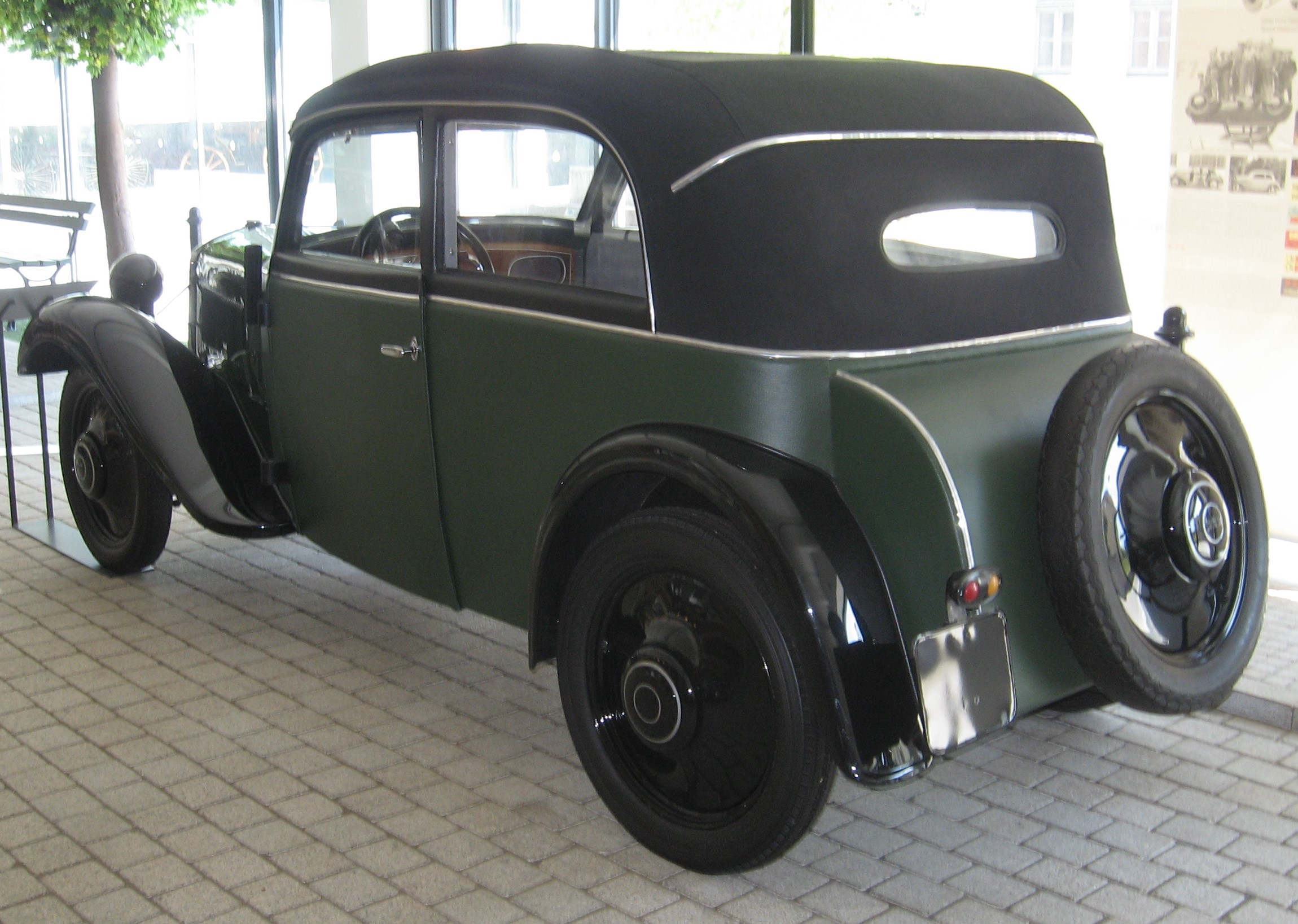
DKW F2 2-door cabrio-limousine rear

The body was based on a self-supporting timber frame with a “U-profile” subframe. All four wheels were attached via independent suspension. The most frequently specified body was a “cabrio-limousine”, a four seater two-door body with a soft top but fixed window frames at the side. A “full cabriolet” was also offered. The body was longer and more elegantly styled than that of the DKW F1.

== Upgrades ==
In 1933 the engine was upgraded through the inclusion of Schnürle porting to the top portions of each of the cylinders. The system, designed by the two-stroke engine expert Adolf Schnürle, increased the efficiency of the fuel feed and extraction into and out of the cylinders and enabled the manufacturer to raise the claimed maximum power output of the 584cc engine to 13 kW (18 PS). The system would appear on many of the F2’s 2-stroke engined successors through and beyond the 1930s. As the first in a succession of confusing model name changes from DKW, the 584cc engined car with the improved fuel feed system was renamed the DKW Reichsklasse.

At the same time as the DKW Meisterklasse (branded as the DKW Meisterklasse 601) had its 584cc engine upgraded and its name changed to DKW Reichsklasse, a larger engined version of the F2, also featuring Schnürle porting, was introduced, now taking the name DKW Meisterklasse 701. For the new 692cc engined version of the car maximum power output was stated as 15 kW (20 PS).

== Commercial ==
About 17,000 F2s were built between 1932 and 1935 split between the Meisterklasse and the Reichsklasse. 1932 had found DKW placed fourth in terms of passenger car sales, with just 3,934 cars sold. In 1933, the year in which the government decided to stimulate the German auto-industry by abolishing the annual car tax charge, DKW overtook Mercedes-Benz (whose cars, admittedly, would have been much larger and, per unit, more profitable) and Adler to become Germany’s second best selling auto-brand, beaten to the top position only by Opel. The F2 was not DKW’s only model during this period, but it was the company’s top seller by a big margin.

The F2 Meisterklasse was mildly rebodied as the F4 Meisterklasse in 1934 while the F2 Reichsklasse continued to be offered for another year. In 1935 the DKW F5 replaced both the F2 and the F4.

== Sources and further reading ==
This entry incorporates information from the German Wikipedia DKW F2 article.
