= DKW F1 =

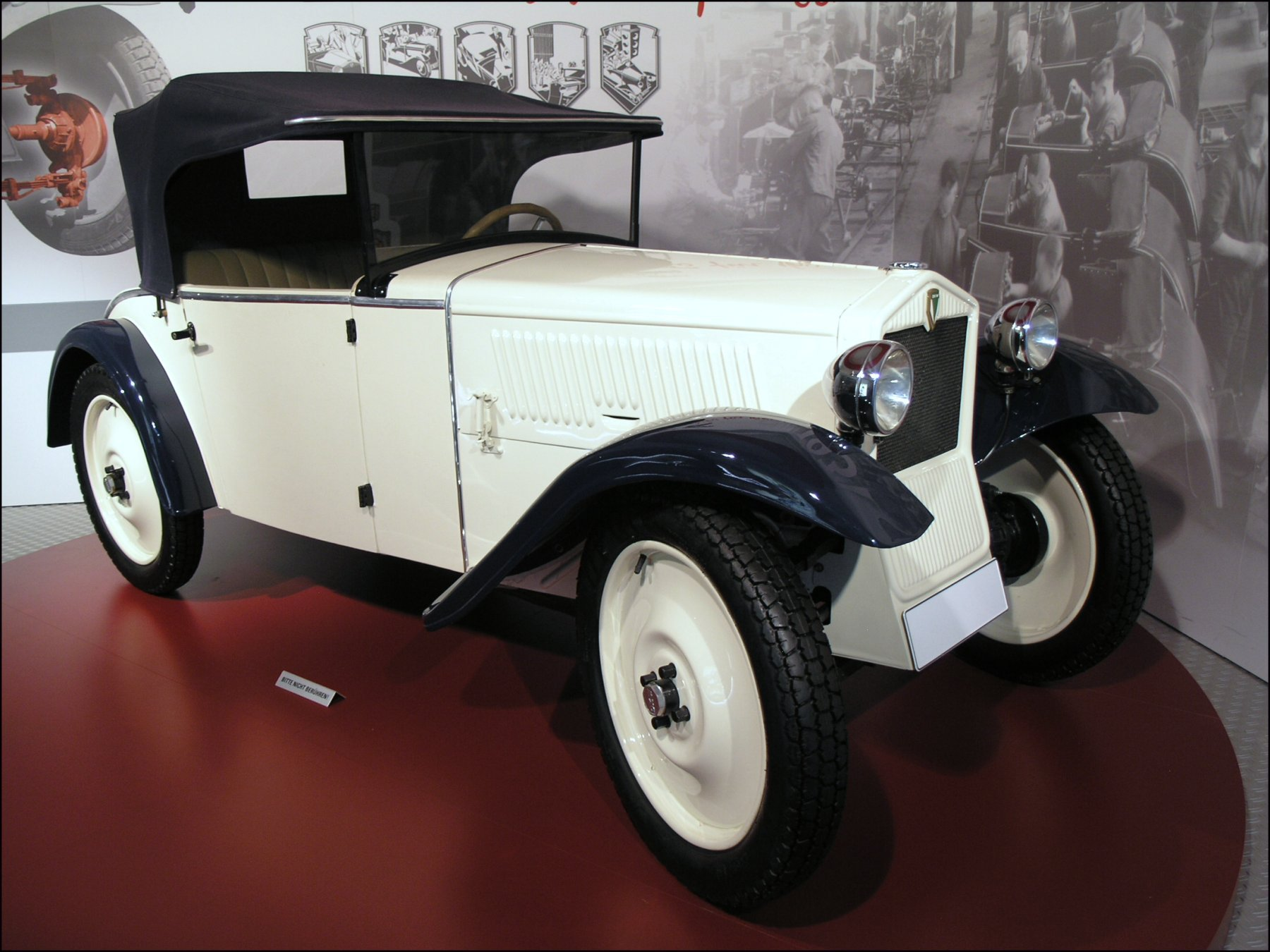

Overview
- Manufacturer: DKW (Auto Union)
- Also called: DKW Front; DKW Typ FA 600
- Production: 1931–1932
- Assembly: Germany: Zwickau

Body and chassis
- Body style: 2- or 4-seater cabriolet various other body types built in small volumes
- Layout: Front-engine, front-wheel-drive

Powertrain
- Engine: 584 cc 2-stroke I2
- Transmission: 3-speed manual

Dimensions
- Wheelbase: 2,100 mm (82.7 in) (2-seater); 2,400 mm (94.5 in) (4-seater)
- Length: 2-seater: 3,100 mm (122.0 in); 4-seater: 3,400 mm (133.9 in)
- Width: 1,300 mm (51.2 in)
- Height: 1,375 mm (54.1 in)

Chronology
- Predecessor: Wanderer W24
- Successor: DKW F2

The DKW F1 was a small car mass produced by DKW (part of the Auto Union) between 1931 and 1932. It was launched at the Berlin Motor Show in February 1931.

The F1 was the first of a series of front wheel drive cars, assembled at DKW's Zwickau plant, while a line of larger, rear-wheel drive DKWs were built in the company's Spandau (locality) plant, (district of Berlin).

== Origins ==
In October 1930 the company's Danish born chief, Jørgen Skafte Rasmussen, instructed his development team at the Zwickau plant to design a small, cheap people's car, that could be powered by an existing DKW motorcycle engine, and built at the plant.

Rasmussen specified an innovative design, with good road-holding qualities, thus he required a chassis with the lowest possible centre of gravity, featuring front-wheel drive, and independent suspension. He gave his crew a very short timeline six weeks to draw up a design, and prepare three running prototypes.

== Development and launch ==
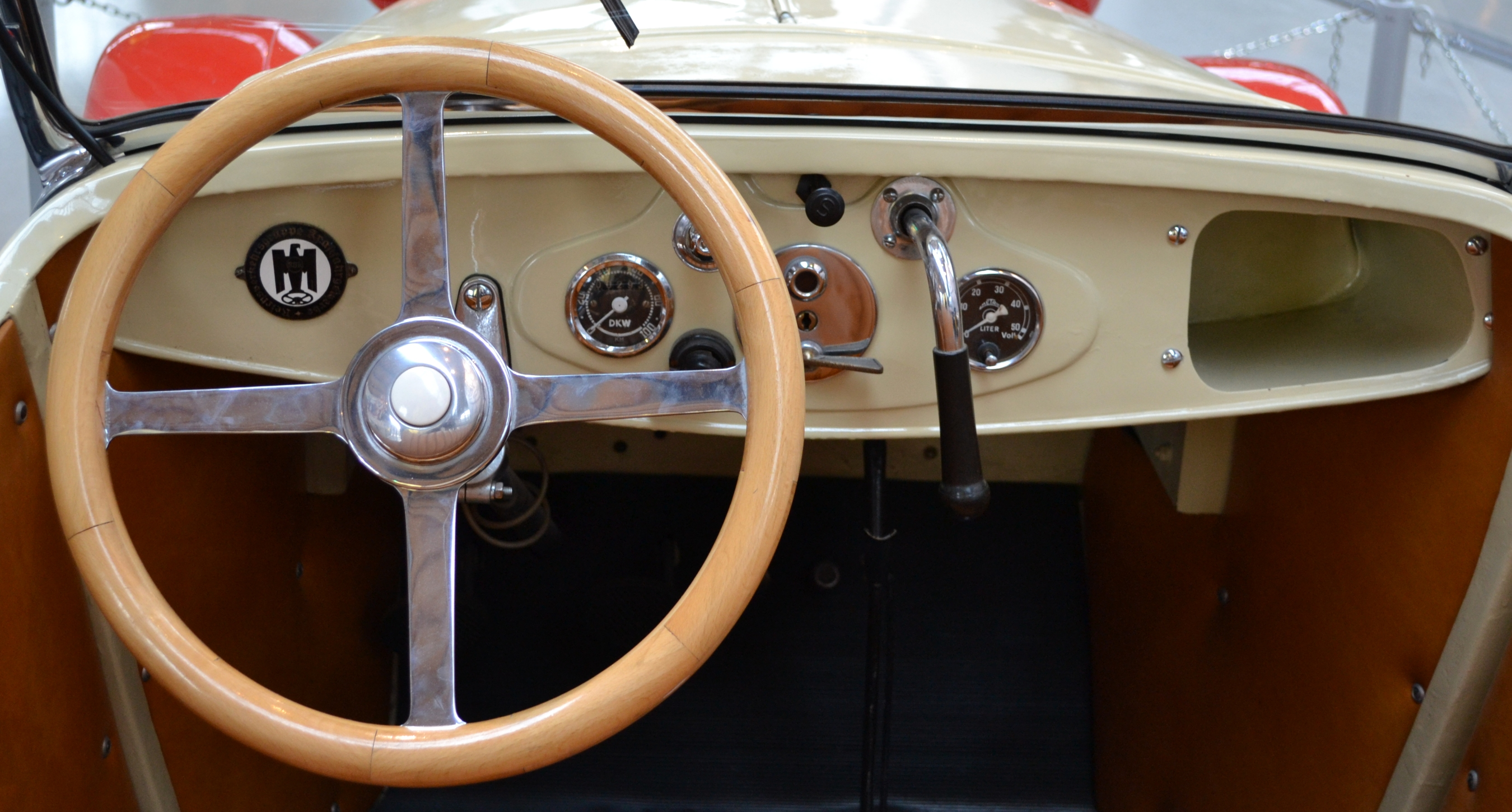
1931 DKW F1 Roadster dashboard

After just six weeks the team designed a 2 + 1 seater roadster with a curb weight of 450 kg including a full fuel tank of 25 litres, which offered improved driving dynamics and more speed. In addition to undertaking the design work, the team had prepared the three test vehicles in the time given. Called the FA in this pre-series form, this was the car which appeared at the Berlin Motor Show in February 1931 with an open topped steel body, and a 494 cc two-cylinder two-stroke engine.

By the time, later in the same year, that cars were in production for sale, the design had been altered with a stronger drive shaft mechanism, and a simpler, cheaper timber frame body, clad in imitation leather. Light weight and low cost remained the priorities. The car cost approximately 1700 Reichsmark.

In addition to the 494 cc engine, a slightly larger 584 cc was developed, providing 11 kW (15 PS) of advertised maximum power. In the event, none of the smaller-engined DKW F1 Type F500 was ever sold. The approximately 4,000 F1s that were sold all came powered by the larger Type 600 engine. Nevertheless, sales brochures dating from the summer of 1932 still included both engine sizes, which enabled the manufacturer to advertise an "eye catchingly low" starting price for the car.

== Body types ==
As was normal at this time even for very small cars, a range of body types was available. In addition to the roadster, open topped sedan/saloon and saloon bodied cars, buyers could also specify various sports style bodies including a single seater featuring a then fashionable “boat-deck” style rear end.

At an enthusiasts’ meeting at the Nürburgring in the 1970s it was reported that a single seater sports bodied DKW F1 recorded a top speed of 120 km/h (75 mph).

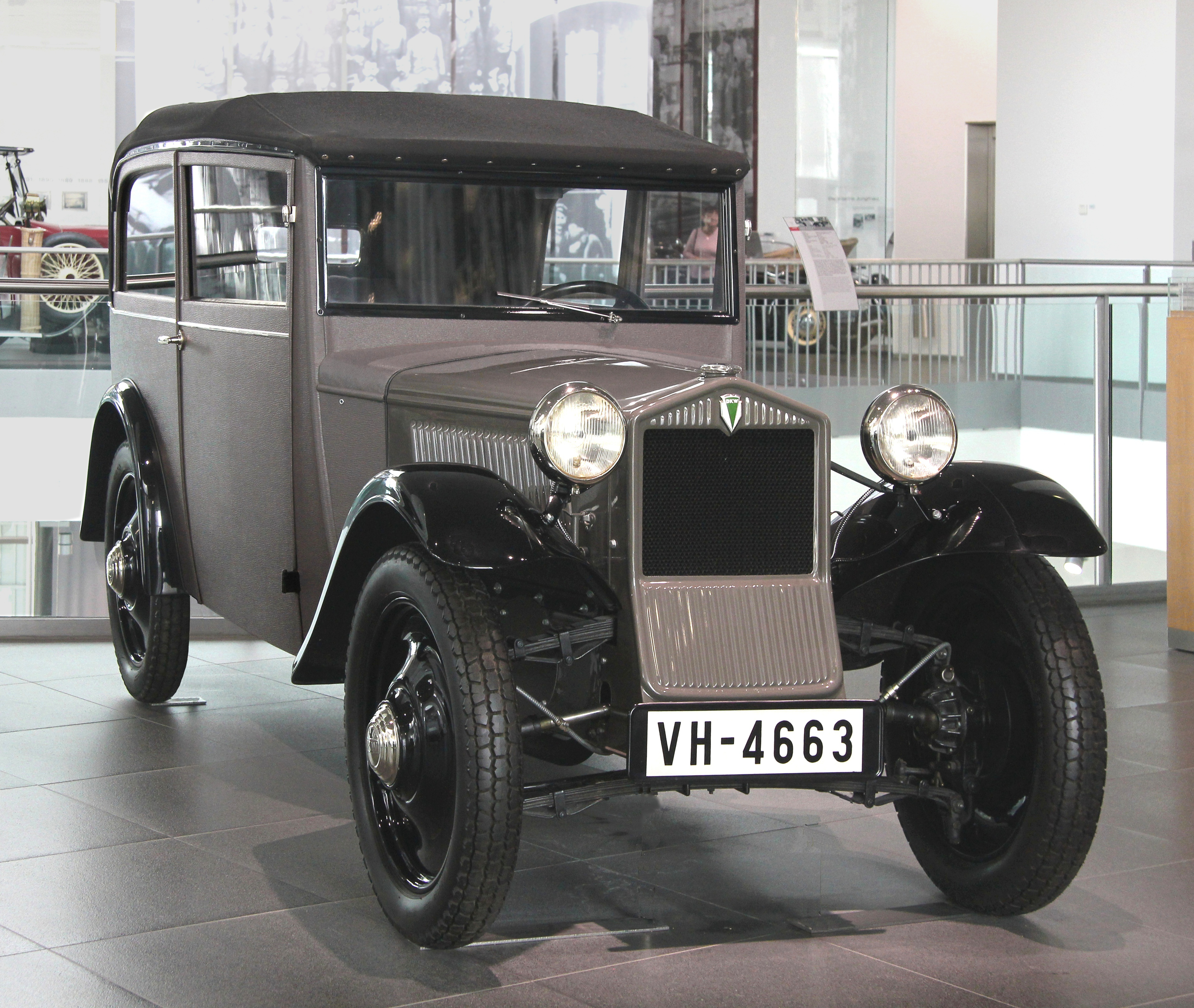
1931 DKW F1 sedan

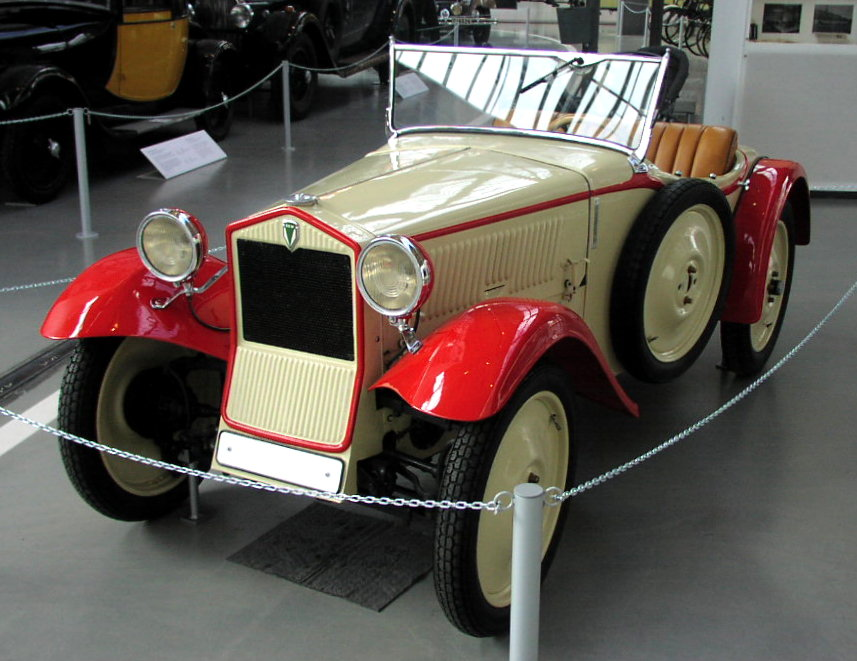
1931 DKW F1 Roadster

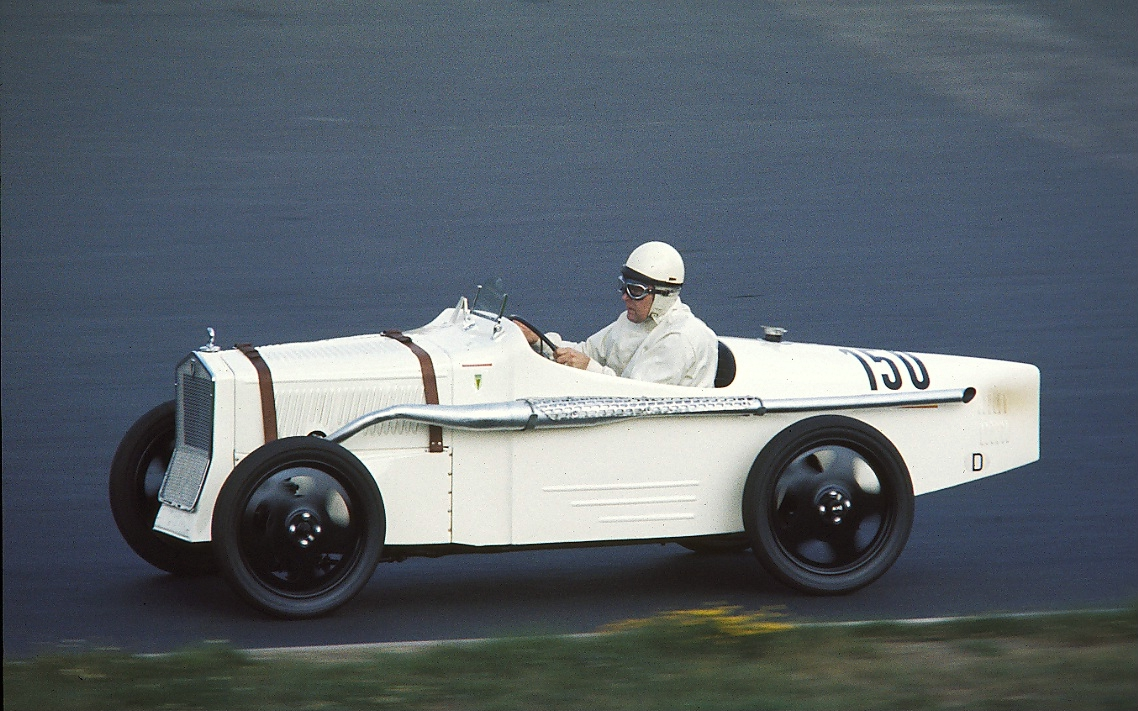
DKW F1 single seater at Nürburgring

== Manufacturing logistics ==
The F1, like subsequent front wheel drive DKWs until 1942, was assembled at the company's Zwickau plant which Rasmussen had acquired for the business in 1928 or 1929 by becoming a majority shareholder in Audi-Werke AG. The F1's body was assembled at the Spandau factory which had been acquired by Rasmussen in 1924 with the purchase of SB-Automobil-GmbH. The timber bodies were then transported the approximately 300 kilometers (190 miles) to Zwickau by train.

The Zschopau plant was close to Zwickau and had originated in 1906 as an armaments factory established by Berthold Ruppe. Its inclusion in what would become the Auto Union dated from Rasmussen's work with Ruppe's son, Hugo, in establishing at the plant the "Zschopauer Motorenwerke J. S. Rasmussen AG". By 1931 this plant had become home to the largest manufacturer of motorcycles in the world, and it was Zschopau that produced the two stroke engines for the DKW F1 and its successors.

== Commercial ==
Approximately 4,000 DKW F1s were sold between 1931 and 1932 which would have equated to a market share of approximately 8% in a depressed passenger car market. However, the DKW F1's larger significance arose both because it pioneered volume production for front-wheel drive cars and because it was the first in a line of inexpensive light weight DKWs, from the F1 to the F8, which secured DKW's position as the country's most successful manufacturer of small cars in the 1930s and second place in the country's sales charts (beaten to the top position only by Opel) every year between 1933 and 1938.

== Sources and further reading ==
- Audi (publisher): Das Rad der Zeit. 2000.
- Oswald, Werner (2001). Deutsche Autos 1920-1945, Band (vol) 2 (in German). Motorbuch Verlag. ISBN 3-613-02170-6.
- Rauch, Siegfried: DKW – Die Geschichte einer Weltmarke. Motorbuch Verlag, Stuttgart 1988.
- Staatsarchiv Chemnitz (publisher): In Fahrt Autos aus Sachsen. Mitteldeutscher Verlag, Halle, Germany, 2005.
- Various authors: Von 0 auf 100. Hundert Jahre Autoland Sachsen. Chemnitzer Verlag, 2001/2003.

This entry is based on information from the German Wikipedia DKW F1 article.
