= 1953 1000 km of Nürburgring =

The 1953 ADAC 1000 Kilometer-Rennen Nürburgring took place on 30 August, on the Nürburgring Nordschleife (West Germany). It was also the fifth round of the F.I.A. World Sports Car Championship.

The Eifelrennen had been introduced in 1922 by ADAC as a Targa Florio-like event on Eifel mountain roads and through villages. This soon was impractical, and the Nürburgring was built in the mid-1920s to get away from public roads to a purpose built race track. It is still the world's longest. Sportscar races were part of the early Eifelrennen tradition, but it also hosted motorcycles, Grand Prix cars, and after WW2 Formula 2. There was no event yet that focussed on very long endurance sportscars races only.

1952 was the 25th anniversary of the race track, and a 10 lap sports car race dubbed the XV. Großer Preis von Deutschland – Großer Jubiläumspreis vom Nürburgring für Sportwagen 1952 was run as support for the 1952 German Grand Prix (which was run with Formula 2 cars). The sprint race was won 1-2-3-4 by Mercedes-Benz W194 300 SL Spyders after 1:46 hours, without the driver changes and pits stops of endurance races.

With a World Sportscar Championship being introduced for 1953, the ADAC organized a 1000 km event, the shortest in the calendar, with the 1953 RAC Tourist Trophy being run over more than 1200 km. With Mercedes having discontinued the 1952 sportscar success to focus on a 1954 Formula 1 entry, and other brands like Borgward and Porsche having only small 1500cc cars, no domestic brand could challenge the Italian and British cars in 1953. Attendance was rather low. The 1000 km was not resumed in 1954 as public interest was drawn to the success of the new Mercedes Silver Arrows. International sportscar racing was back in the focus in 1955 when the Mercedes-Benz 300SLR was introduced, but the Le Mans tragedy caused cancellation of many races, Nürburgring events like the 31 July 1955 German Grand Prix and the 28 August 1955 1000 km was among them. It took place as a smaller event for 500 km and 1500cc though.

The ADAC resumed with the 1956 1000 km of Nürburgring.

Nürburgring Nordschleife

== Report ==
=== Entry ===
A grand total of 66 racing cars were registered for this event, of which 54 arrived for practice and qualifying. Scuderia Ferrari, under the name of Automobili Ferrari, arrived with three 375 MMs for the all-Italian pairings of Giuseppe Farina / Alberto Ascari and Umberto Maglioli / Piero Carini, with the third car for Luigi Villoresi and Mike Hawthorn. Scuderia Lancia entered two D24s, the first driven by Juan Manuel Fangio, who had switched from Alfa Romeo, and Felice Bonetto, and the second driven by Robert Manzon and Piero Taruffi. Lancia also entered an older D20 driven by Giovanni Bracco and Eugenio Castellotti. Also from Italy came three works Maserati A6GCSs.

=== Qualifying ===
The Lancia D24 of Juan Manuel Fangio took pole position, averaging a speed of 83.714 mph around the 14.167 mile circuit. However, following engine problems, the Ferrari 375 MM of Mike Hawthorn and Luigi Villoresi was withdrawn from the meeting and their engine used by the lead car of Alberto Ascari and Giuseppe Farina. The team's third entry was also withdrawn from the meeting.

=== Race ===
A lead Lancias fell out of contention by lap 15, but then the factory efforts and the bigger privateers began to run into trouble. Although two of the three works Ferraris were withdrawn prior to the start of the race, Scuderia victory was never seriously threatened despite the first three cars were all being one same lap as the race winners, Ascari / Farina.

For the second round running, the Scottish Ecurie Ecosse finished second overall. The pairing of Ian Stewart and Roy Salvadori were over 15 minutes behind the Ferrari, but still won their class by three laps. Almost 30 minutes behind the winner, Adolf Brudes and Franz Eugen Hammernick reached the finish in their Borgward Hansa 1500RS in third place overall. The other works Borgward of Karl Guenther Bechem / Theo Helfrich had taken the car up to third place before retiring with an engine failure. The last two classified finishers were two Gutbrod Superiors with a 700cc two-stroke engine. They were seven laps behind the Ferrari.

The winning partnership of Ascari/Farina won in a time of 8hr 20:44.0mins., averaging a speed of 74.694 mph. They covered a distance of 2,281.182 miles. The race did not end when the overall winner crossed the finishing line, but continued for another hour to allow the other classes to try and complete the full 1000 km.

== Official Classification ==
Class Winners are in Bold text.

Pos	No	Class	Driver		Entrant	Chassis	Laps	Reason Out
1st	**1**	**S+2.0**	(Italy) **Alberto Ascari**	(Italy) **Giuseppe Farina**	**Automobili Ferrari**	**Ferrari 375 MM Vignale Spyder**	**8hrs 20:44.000, 44**	
2nd	**53**	**ser.S+2.0**	**(United Kingdom) Ian Stewart**	**(United Kingdom) Roy Salvadori**	**Ecurie Ecosse**	**Jaguar C-Type**	**8hrs 35:49.000, 44**	
3rd	**37**	**S1.5**	**(West Germany) Adolf Brudes**	**(Switzerland) Franz Hammernick**	**Borgward GmbH**	**Borgward Hansa 1500 RS**	**8hrs 50:33.000, 44**	
4th	39	S1.5	(East Germany) Richard Trenkel	(West Germany) Walter Schlüter	Richard Trenkel	Glöckler-Porsche Nr.5	43	
5th	**26**	**S2.0**	**(West Germany) Wolfgang Seidel**	**(West Germany) Josef Peters**	**Wolfgang Seidel**	**Veritas Comet RS**	**9hrs 25:17.000, 43**	
6th	54	ser.S+2.0	(United Kingdom) Jimmy Stewart	(United Kingdom) Jock Lawrence	Ecurie Ecosse	Jaguar C-Type	41	
7th	33	S1.5	(Italy) Gaetano Sani	(Italy) Piero Carini	San Giorgio	Osca MT4 1100	42	
8th	34	S1.5	(Italy) Armando François	(West Germany) Erwin Bauer	San Giorgio	Osca MT4 1100	41	
9th	50	ser.S+2.0	(Italy) Riccardo Vignolo	(Netherlands) Maurice Gatsonides	Roberto Rossellini	Ferrari 212 Inter	40	
10th	52T	ser.S+2.0	(United Kingdom) James Scott Douglas	(United Kingdom) Ninian Sanderson	Ecurie Ecosse	Jaguar XK120	40	
11th	**67**	**ser.S2.0**	**(United Kingdom) Mike Currie**	**(United Kingdom) Don Beauman**	**Michael L. Currie**	**Fraser Nash Le Mans Replica**	**9hrs 53:39.000, 44**	
12th	61	ser.S2.0	(West Germany) Paul Metternich	(West Germany) Wittigo Einsiedel	Gustav Wirth	Porsche 356 1500	10hrs 01:59.000, 44	
13th	**80**	**ser.S1.3**	**(France) Hans Leo von Hoesch**	**(France) Werner Engel**	**Hans Leo von Hoesch**	**Porsche 356 1100**	**10hrs 01:19.000, 44**	
14th	86	ser.S1.3	(West Germany) Rolf-Friedrich Gőtze	(United States) William Godsey	Rolf-Friedrich Gőtze	Porsche 356 1100	10hrs 02:14.000, 44	
15th	62	ser.S2.0	(Netherlands) Mathieu Hezemans	(Netherlands) Jacques van der Meulen	NAV	Porsche 356 1500	10hrs 00:37.000, 44	
16th	23	S2.0	(United Kingdom) Alan Brown	(Argentina) José M. Faraoni	Equipe Anglaise	Cooper-Bristol T20 Sports	40	
17th	85	ser.S1.3	(West Germany) Ernst van Husen	(West Germany) Walter Scheube	Ernst van Husen	Porsche 356 1100	43	
18th	87	ser.S1.3	(Belgium) Fernand Georges	(France) “Chenevoy”	Fernand Georges	Porsche 356 1100	42	
19th	32	S1.5	(United Kingdom) Jim Mayers	(United Kingdom) Pat Griffith	Monkey Stable	Keift-MG	41	
20th	56	ser.S+2.0	(Belgium) Kasimir Olislaegers	(Belgium) Charles de Keerle	Kasimir Olislaegers	Jaguar C-Type	35	
21st	**92**	**ser.S750**	**(West Germany) Helmut Glöckler**	**(West Germany) Hendrik Beckers**	**Helmut Glöckler**	**Renault 4CV/1063**	**10hrs 29:05.000, 41**	
22nd	90	ser.S750	(France) Georges Trouis	(France) Jacques Blanchet	Georges Trouis	Panhard Dyna Junior	41	
23rd	**43**	**S750**	**(West Germany) Walter Komossa**	**(West Germany) Kurt Arnold**	**Rosterg**	**Scampolo – DKW**	**10hrs 32:49.000, 40**	
24th	66	ser.S2.0	(Italy) Bruno Martignoni	(Italy) Sergio Mantovani	Bruno Marignoli	Alfa Romeo 1900	35	
25th	93	ser.S750	(West Germany) Erich Kramwinkel	(West Germany) Klaus Krämer	Kramwinkel	Gutbrod Special	37	
26th	94	ser.S750	(West Germany) Heinz Lindermann	(West Germany) Hein Krings	Heinz Lindermann	Gutbrod Special	37	
NC	41	S750	(France) Louis Bizeray	(France) Mme. Bizeray	Nantes	Renault 4CV Special	36	
DNF	20	S2.0	(Italy) Emilio Giletti	(Argentina) Onofre Marimón	Scuderia Maserati	Maserati A6GCS	41	Engine
DNF	6	S+2.0	(France) Robert Manzon	(Italy) Piero Tariffi	Scuderia Lancia	Lancia D24	15	Battery
DNF	5	S+2.0	(Argentina) Juan Manuel Fangio	(Italy) Felice Bonetto	Scuderia Lancia	Lancia D24	9	Fuel Pump
DNF	60	ser.S2.0	(West Germany) Richard von Frankenberg	(Switzerland) Walter Ringgenberg	Walter Ringgenberg	Porsche 356 1500	2	Accident
DNF	7	S+2.0	(Italy) Giovanni Bracco	(Italy) Eugenio Castellotti	Scuderia Lancia	Lancia D20		Electrics
DNF	21	S2.0	(West Germany) Hans Herrmann	(United States) Jack McAfee	Scuderia Maserati	Maserati A6GCS Coupé		Oil line
DNF	22	S2.0	(Italy) Gianni Bertoni	(West Germany) Herrmann Lang	Scuderia Maserati	Maserati A6GCS		Engine
DNF	25	S2.0	(Netherlands) Johannes Westhof	(Netherlands) Klaas Barendragt	Johannes Westhof	Veritas Scorpion		Starter
DNF	29	S	(West Germany) Hanns Roth	(West Germany) Fritz Kasper	Hanns Roth	AFM 49 Intertyp Küchen		Engine
DNF	30	S1.5	(United Kingdom) Mike Keen	(United Kingdom) Michael Pope	Monkey Stable	Keift-MG		Hub
DNF	31	S1.5	(United Kingdom) Tommy Line	(United Kingdom) Mike Llewellyn	Monkey Stable	Keift-MG		Engine
DNF	35	S1.5	(Italy) Francesco Giardini	(West Germany) Heinrich Sauter	San Giorgio	Osca MT4 1100		Gearbox
DNF	36	S1.5	(United Kingdom) David Blakely	(United Kingdom) Lionel Leonard	Lionel Leonard	Leonard-MG		Steering arm
DNF	38	S1.5	(West Germany) Karl-Günther Bechem	(West Germany) Theo Helfrich	Borgward GmbH	Borgward Hansa 1500 RS		Engine
DNF	51	ser.S+2.0	(West Germany) Toni Ulmen	(Belgium) Herman Roosdorp	Herman Roosdorp	Jaguar C-Type		Accident
DNF	55	ser.S+2.0	(Belgium) Olivier Gendebien	(Belgium) Roger Laurent	Ecurie Francorchamps	Jaguar C-Type		Piston
DISQ	63	ser.S1.5	(France) Elyane Imbert	(France) Simone des Forest	Elyane Imbert	Porsche 356 1500		Assistance
DNF	64	ser.S1.5	(Switzerland) Arthur Heuberger	(Switzerland) Ernst Seiler	Arthur Heuberger	Porsche 356 1500		Accident
DISQ	65	ser.S1.5	(West Germany) Heinz Friederichs	(West Germany) Horst Lauprecht	Heinz Friedrichs	Porsche 356 1500		Assistance
DNF	68	ser.S1.5	(West Germany) Kurt Zeller	(West Germany) Walter Zeller	Kurt Zeller	Ferrari 166 MM		Out of fuel
DNF	81	ser.S1.3	(West Germany) Adolf Vianden	(West Germany) Harry Merkel	Adolf Vianden	Porsche 356 1100		Engine
DNF	83	ser.S1.3	(West Germany) Albrecht W. Mantzel	(West Germany) Rolf Madaus	Albrecht W. Mantzel	Porsche 356 1100		Engine
DNF	84	ser.S1.3	(West Germany) Franz Eugen Kesselstatt	(West Germany) Bernt Spiegel	Walter Glöckler	Porsche 356 1100		Accident
DNS	2	S+2.0	(United Kingdom) Mike Hawthorn	(Italy) Giuseppe Farina (Italy) Alberto Ascari	Automobili Ferrari	Ferrari 375 MM Vignale Spyder		Engine to car no.1
DNS	3	S+2.0	(Italy) Umberto Maglioli	(Italy) Piero Carini	Automobili Ferrari	Ferrari 375 MM Vignale Spyder		Withdrawn
DNS	25	S2.0	(West Germany) Ernst Lautenschlager	(West Germany) Heinz Fischer	Ernst Lautenschlager	Veritas Comet RS		
DNS	52	ser.S+2.0	(United Kingdom) James Scott Douglas	(United Kingdom) Ninian Sanderson	Ecurie Ecosse	Jaguar C-Type		Accident

- Fastest Lap: Robert Manzon, 10:23.000secs (81.866 mph)

=== Class Winners ===
Class	Winners		
Sports +2.0	1	Ferrari 375 MM Vignale Spyder	Ascari / Farina
Sports 2.0	26	Veritas Comet RS	Seidel / Peters
Sports 1.5	37	Borgward Hansa 1500 RS	Brudes / Hammernick
Sports 750	43	Scampolo-DKW	Komossa / Arnold
Serie Sports +2.0	53	Jaguar C-Type	Stewart / Salvadori
Serie Sports 2.0	67	Frazer Nash Le Mans Replica	Currie / Beauman
Serie Sports 1.3	80	Porsche 356 1100	von Hoesch / Engel
Serie Sports 750	92	Renault 4CV/1063	Glöckler / Beckers

== Standings after the race ==
Pos	Championship	Points
1	(Italy) Ferrari	26 (27)
2	(United Kingdom) Jaguar	24
3	(United States) Cunningham	12
4	(United Kingdom) Aston Martin	8
5	(Italy) Alfa Romeo	6

- Note: Only the top five positions are included in this set of standings.

Championship points were awarded for the first six places in each race in the order of 8-6-4-3-2-1. Manufacturers were only awarded points for their highest finishing car with no points awarded for positions filled by additional cars. Only the best 4 results out of the 7 races could be retained by each manufacturer. Points earned but not counted towards the championship totals are listed within brackets in the above table.

World Sportscar Championship
Previous race: Spa 24 Hours	1953 season	Next race: RAC Tourist Trophy
