= Franz Hammernick =

Swiss racing driver

- Nationality: (Switzerland) Swiss
- Born: Franz Eugen Hammernick

Franz Eugen Hammernick, was a Swiss racing driver who completed mainly in Sports Car racing during the 1950s.

== Career ==
His most notable results was a third place in the ADAC-1000 Kilometer-Rennen, taking a class win, when he partnered Adolf Brudes, in a Borgward Hansa 1500 RS. The couple years before, he took a class victory in the 1951 Eifelrennen.

The only other event of note during Hammernick career, was during the 1954 Carrera Panamericana, when as one of the works Borgward drivers, he struck an embankment trying to avoid a dog. He was thrown out of the car and broke his collarbone.

== Racing record ==
=== Career highlights ===
Season	Series	Position	Team	Car
1951	Internationales ADAC-Eifelrennen Nürburgring [S1.5]	1st		Veritas RS BMW
1953	Internationales ADAC-1000 km Rennen Weltmeisterschaftslauf Nürburgring	3rd	Borgward	Borgward Hansa 1500 RS
1954	Preis von Bremgarten	2nd		Borgward 54 1500

=== Complete Carrera Panamericana results ===
Year	Team	Co-Drivers	Car	Class	Stage	Pos.	Class Pos.
1954	(West Germany) Carl Borgward	(West Germany) Fritz Jüttner	Borgward Rennsport 55	S1.5	1	DNF (Accident)	
