= Richard Trenkel =

East German racing driver

- Nationality: (East Germany) East German
- Died: 5 July 1964

Richard Trenkel was an East German racing driver, who twice won his class of the DDR Sportscar Championship, in 1953 and 1953, who died 5 July 1964.

== Racing driver ==
Trenkel was a competent racing driver who raced mainly between 1948 and 1963, who only even raced with East and West Germany. During these years, recording a number of good results, including 12 class wins and numerous podiums finishes, with the majority of these at national events. His greatest racing achievement, when partnered by Walter Schlüter, he finished fourth in the Internationales ADAC-1000 km Rennen Weltmeisterschaftslauf Nürburgring.

Sadly, Trenkel is best remembered for incident during the 1954 Sachsenring-Rennen Hohenstein-Ernstthal. During the race, Trenkel lost control of his Porsche, hit and killed three race officials. His last International event was 1963 Rallye Wiesbaden where he finished 11th overall.

== Racing record ==
=== Career highlights ===
Season	Series	Position	Team	Car
1952	DDR Sportscar Championship [S1.1]	1st		Porsche
1953	DDR Sportscar Championship [S1.1]	1st		Glöcker-Porsche Nr.5
