= Walter Schlüter =

German rally driver

- Nationality: (Germany) German
- Born: 1911
- Died: November 1977 (aged 65–66)

Walter Schlüter (1911 – November 1977) was a West German racing and rally driver, who won the 1954 European Rally Championship.

== Racing Driver ==
Schlüter was a fuel wholesale by trade, from Velbert. He started racing in 1930, notably in a modified BMW 328. After the World War II, he played an instrumental in the re-establishing of the Automobilclub von Deutschland (AvD), and getting motor racing underway in Germany. In 1950, he entered the inaugural season of the Deutsche Meisterschaft Formel 3, where he raced a Monopoletta-BMW. During the season, he won F3 support race at the Großer Preis von Deutschland, on the Nürburgring Nordschleife. This result helped him to third overall in the championship.

Schlüter returned the following season, but without much success, although he became to first German driver to complete in England following the war, when he drove his Monopoletta-BMW at Brands Hatch in the August Bank Holiday meeting.

== Rally Driver ==
Schlüter, now aged forty, switched to rallying for the 1952 season. He scored his first international victory in the sport when he finished in second on the Rallye Travemünde, as co-driver to Helmut Polensky. The pairing continuing into 1953, where they took two victories as Polensky won the European Rally Championship.

Back on the track, Schlüter scored his greater result when he and Richard Trenkel took fourth place in the 1953 Internationales ADAC-1000 Kilometer Rennen Weltmeisterschaftslauf Nürburgring, a round of the World Sportscar Championship.

When in the autumn of 1953, DKW created their new motor sport department, and Schlüter was one of the trio of drivers signed to tackle the European Rally Championship. By now, Schlüter had moved across to the driver’s seat. After victory on the Rallye Wiesbaden and two further podium finishers, he had been enough to secure the championship title for himself, ahead of the other two DKW drivers.

Schlüter continued with DKW for the next couple seasons, when in 1955, he scored his first outright victory outside of Germany, when he won Norway’s Viking Rally. This would turn out to be his last international victory as well.

== Racing record ==
=== Career highlights ===
Season	Series	Position	Team	Car
1950	Großer Pries von Deutschland [F3]	1st	Walter Schlüter	Monopoletta-BMW
	Deutsche Meisterchaft Formel 3	3rd	Walter Schlüter	Monopoletta-BMW
	Preis von Deutschland für Motorräder	3rd	Walter Schlüter	Monopoletta-BMW
1952	Rallye Travemünde *	2nd		Porsche 356
1953	Coupes des Alpes *	1st		Porsche 356 1500 S
	Internationale ADAC-Rallye Travemünder *	1st		Fiat 1100
	Viking Rally *	2nd		Fiat 1100
	Rally Automovel Int. de Lisboa-Estoril *	3rd		Porsche 356 1500 S
1954	European Rally Championship	1st	DKW	DKW 3=6 F91 Sonderklasse
	Rallye Wiesbaden	1st	DKW	DKW 3=6 F91 Sonderklasse
	Coupes des Alpes	2nd	DKW	DKW 3=6 F91 Sonderklasse
	Rally International de Genèe	2nd	DKW	DKW 3=6 F91 Sonderklasse
1955	Viking Rally	1st	DKW	DKW 3=6 F91 Sonderklasse

- = he was a co-driver on the event

=== Complete Rallye de Monte Carlo results ===
Year	Team	Co-Drivers	Car	Pos.
1955	(West Germany) DKW	(West Germany) ???	DKW 3=6 F91 Sonderklasse	222nd
1956	(West Germany) DKW	(West Germany) ???	DKW 3=6 F91 Sonderklasse	DNF

=== Complete RAC Rally results ===
Year	Team	Co-Drivers	Car	Pos.
1955	(West Germany) DKW	(West Germany) ???	DKW 3=6 F91 Sonderklasse	13th
1956	(West Germany) DKW	(West Germany) ???	DKW 3=6 F91 Sonderklasse	started
