= DKW 3=6 =

Car model

DKW Sonderklasse DKW 3=6 DKW F91/F93/F94
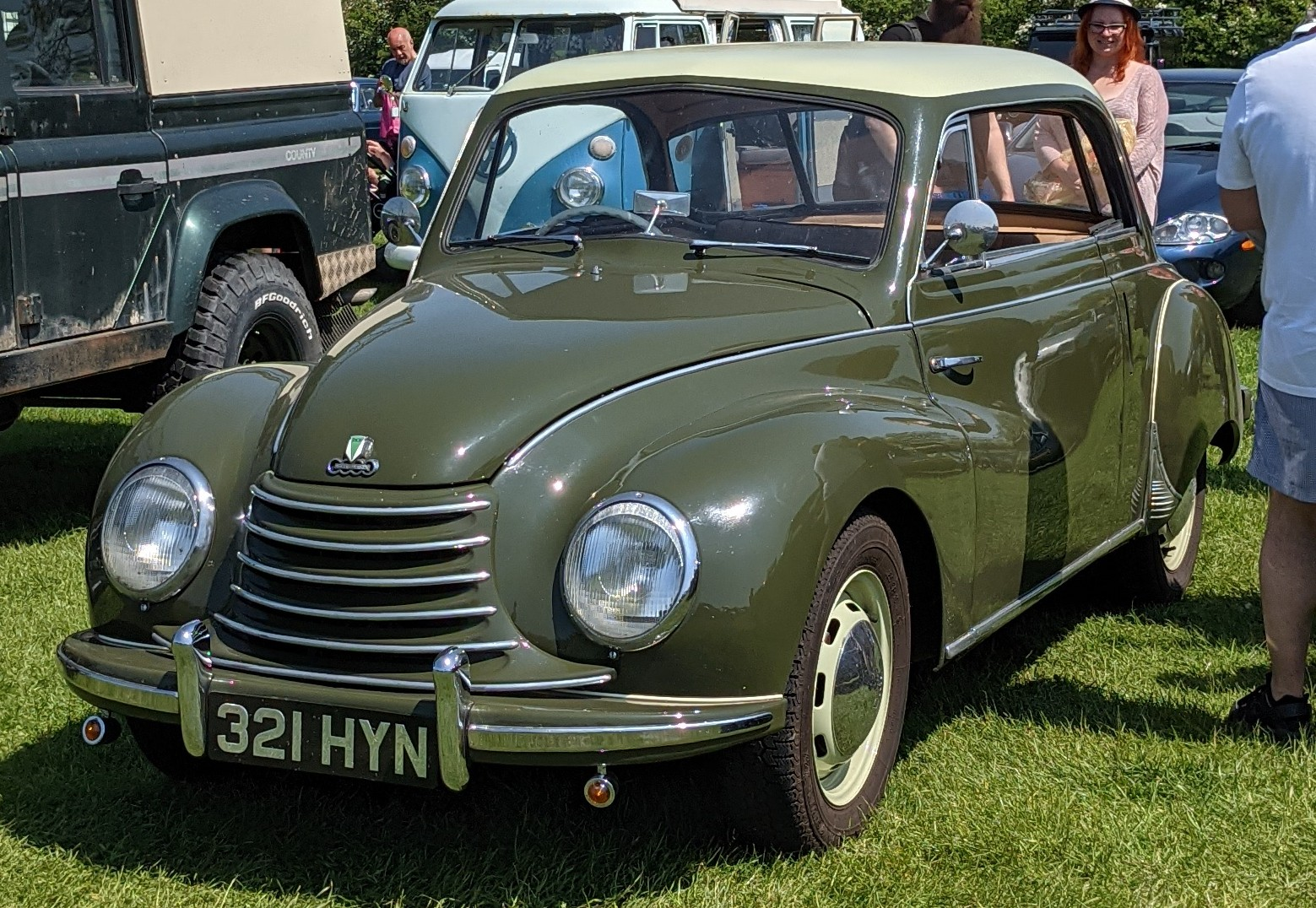
- 1955 DKW 3=6 (F91)

Overview
- Manufacturer: Auto Union GmbH
- Also called: DKW 900 (Netherlands and U.S.); DKW-Vemag Belcar (Brazil; saloon); DKW-Vemag Vemaguet (Brazil; estate)
- Production: March 1953 – July 1959; November 1956 – December 1967 (Brazil)
- Assembly: Germany: Düsseldorf; Brazil: São Paulo (Vemag)

Body and chassis
- Class: Compact / Small family car (C)
- Body style: 2 or 4-door saloon; 2-door coupé & cabriolet; 3-door 'Universal' estate
- Layout: FF layout
- Related: IFA F9

Powertrain
- Engine: 896 cc two-stroke I3
- Transmission: 3 or 4 speed manual

Dimensions
- Wheelbase: 2,350 mm (93 in) (2-door); 2,450 mm (96 in) (4-door)
- Length: 4,170 mm (164 in); 4,325 mm (170.3 in)
- Curb weight: 870–970 kg (1,920–2,140 lb) (empty)

Chronology
- Predecessor: DKW F89
- Successor: Auto Union 1000

The DKW 3=6 is a compact front-wheel drive saloon manufactured by Auto Union GmbH. The car was launched at the Frankfurt Motor Show in March 1953 and sold until 1959. It carried the name Sonderklasse ("Special Class") on the right hand fender of all steel bodied models – this being part of the model name for this range. The first model in the range was named by factory project number, DKW F91, which was replaced by the F93 and F94 models from the 1956 model year. The F93 and F94 models were referred to by Auto Union as the "Big DKW 3=6" (Großer 3=6). By 1958 the car's successor, the Auto Union 1000 Coupe de Luxe, was being sold and the older car had become, in essence, a ‘run-out’ model; it was known more simply (in the US and the Netherlands only) as the DKW 900.

The 3=6's notable features included its 896cc two-stroke engine and front-wheel drive layout, along with the sure-footed handling that resulted.

== History ==
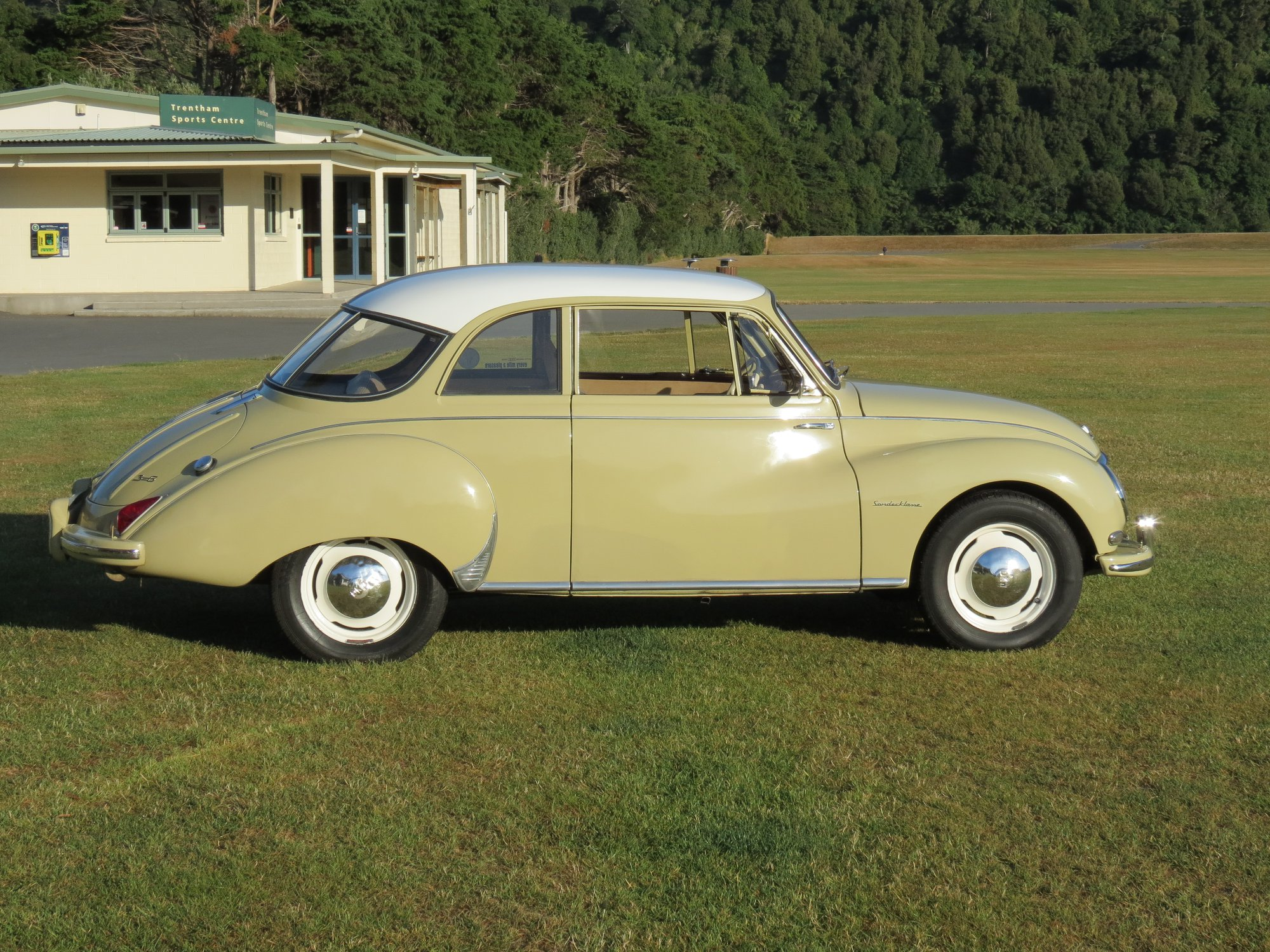
1957 DKW 3=6 F93 Sonderklasse, Wellington, New Zealand

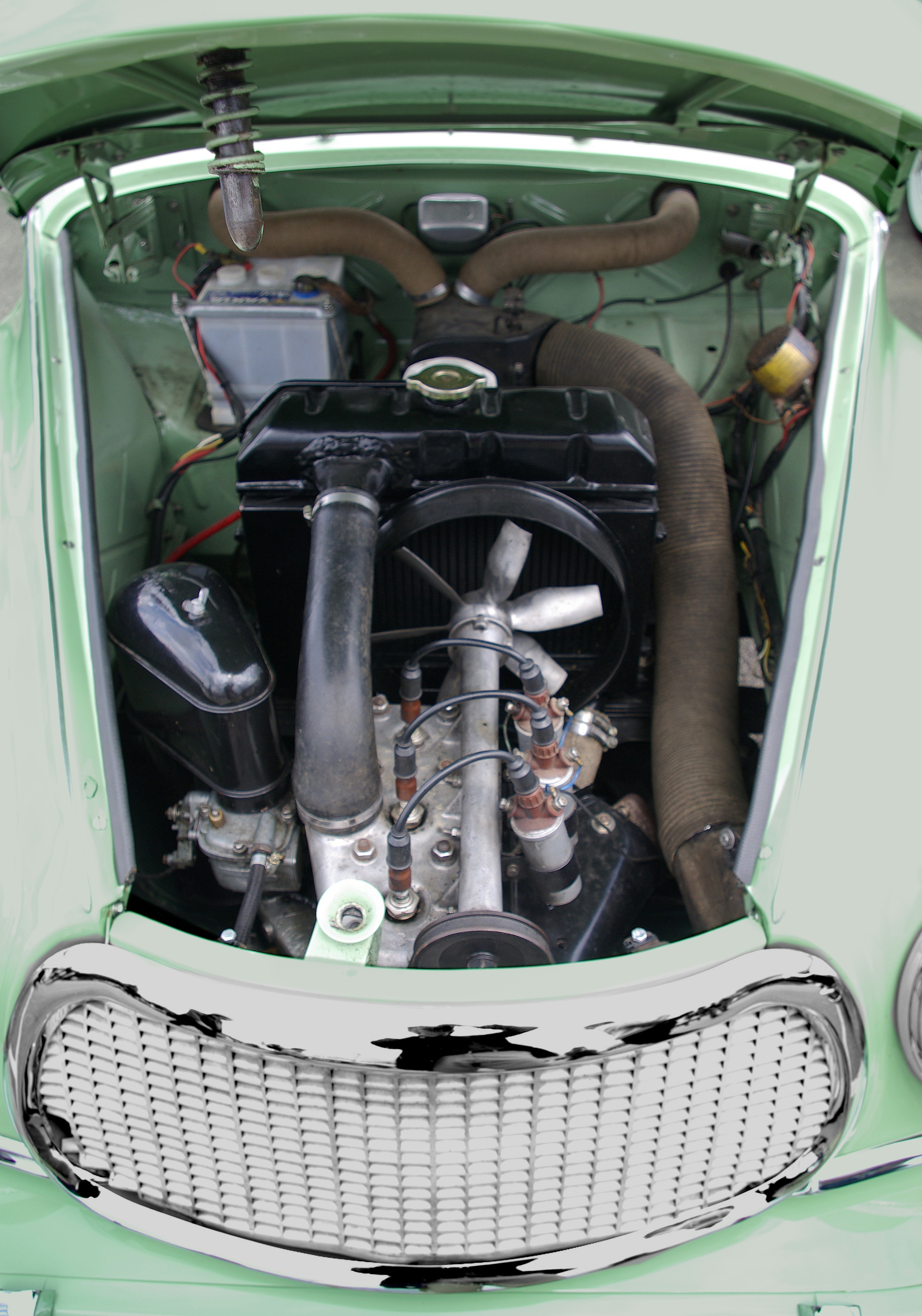
Unusually, the radiator was placed directly ahead of the firewall, behind the two-stroke engine.

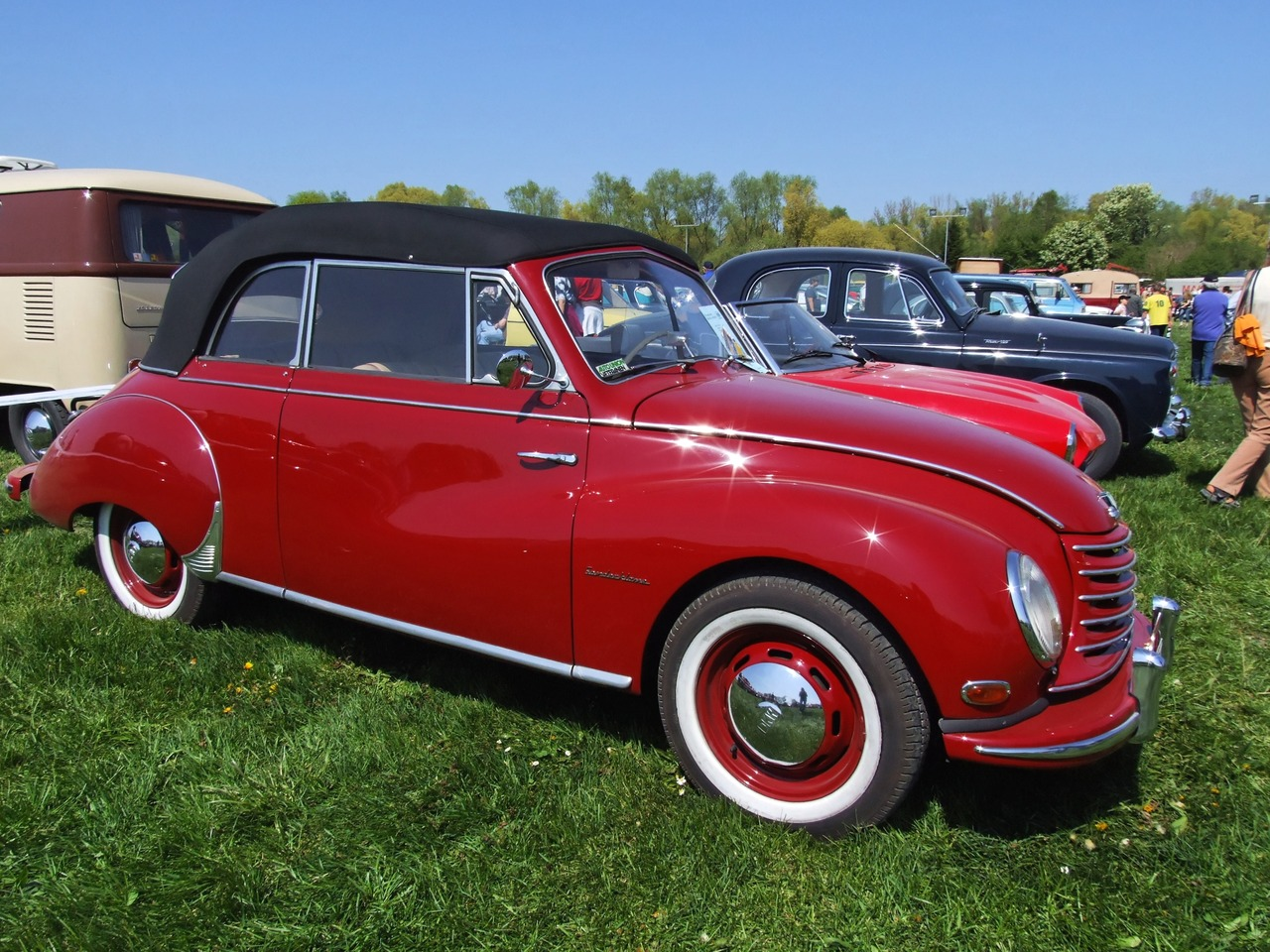
The Karmann bodied cabriolet version. The slatted front grille identifies this as an F91 (prefacelift) version.

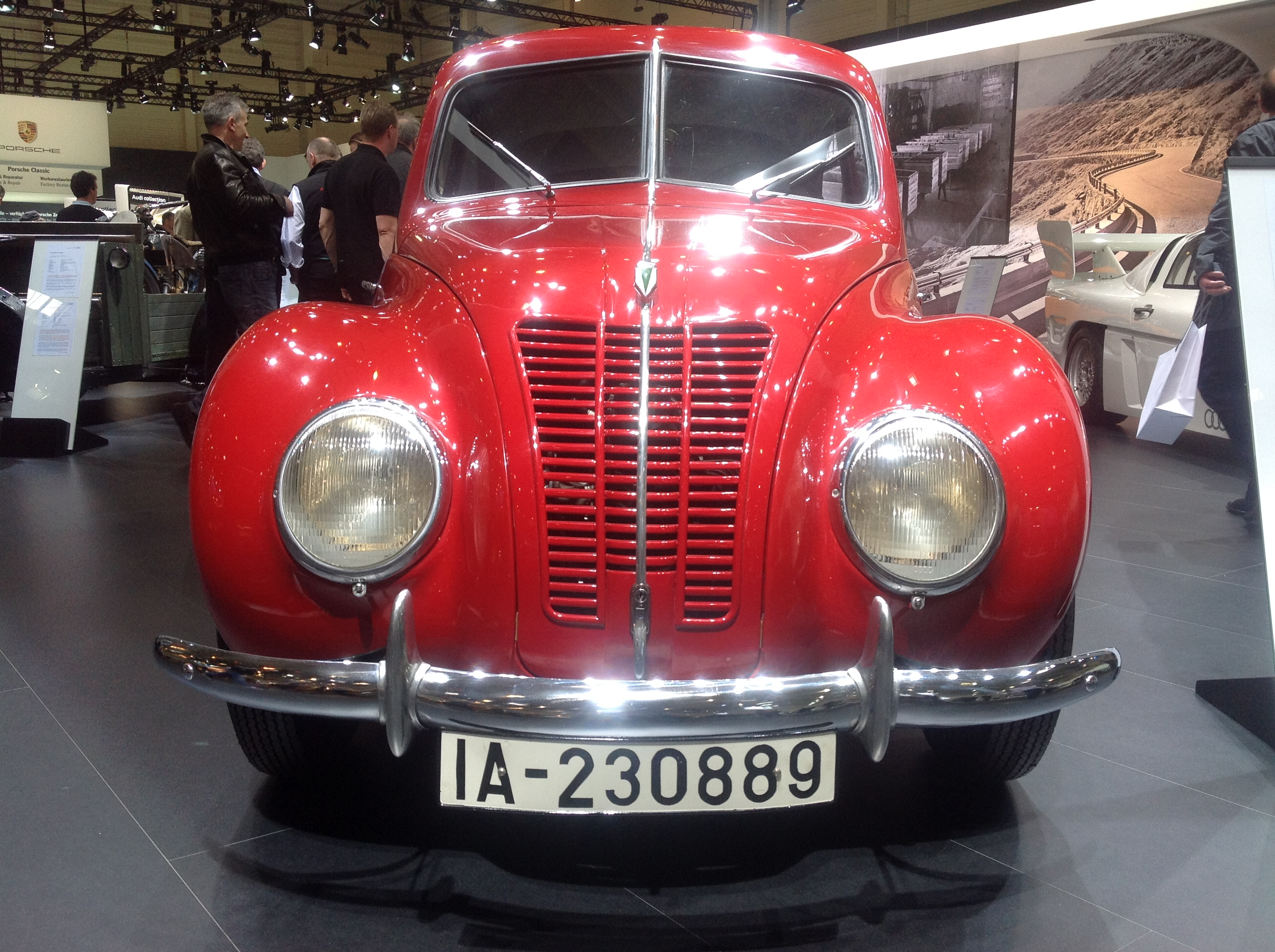
The 3=6 descended directly from the prewar DKW F9 prototype.

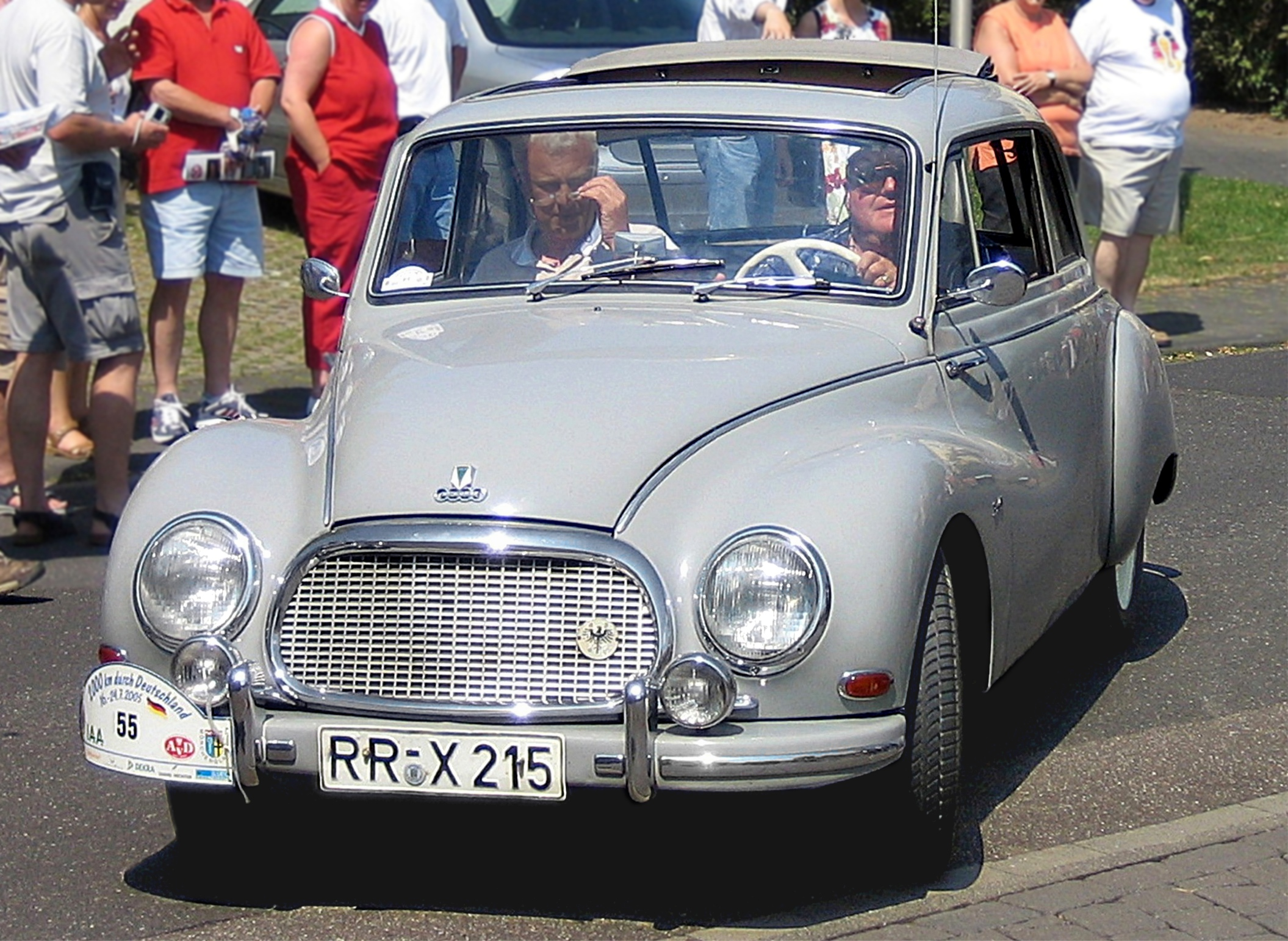
By 1955, the DKW 3=6 grew in width and track by almost 4 inches and was advertised as "der Große DKW", the "large DKW".

The DKW 3=6 in due course replaced the DKW F89 / Meisterklasse, although the Meisterklasse remained in production until April 1954. In its turn, the 3=6 was succeeded by the more powerful Auto Union 1000, offered already from late 1957 for the 1958 model year.

In recognition of the model's significance, Audi Tradition maintains a 1954 DKW 3=6 Sonderklasse in their fleet, and this is occasionally brought out on historical motoring events.

The DKW 3=6 also enjoyed several famous owners, like the celebrated aviator Elly Beinhorn (who named her 3=6 "Alwine VII"), German boxing legend Max Schmeling (twice heavyweight World Champion) and film star Anita Ekberg (star of La Dolce Vita (1960)).

== Many names ==
DKW was one of four companies that had come together in 1932 to form the Auto Union based in Zwickau. The company was effectively refounded in West Germany in 1949, following the loss to the Soviets of its Zwickau assets. Three of the four businesses that had constituted Auto Union before the war seemed unlikely ever to reappear on either side of the Iron Curtain, but starting in 1949 the DKW name was used for the F89 assembled by Auto Union in the west: this was the model replaced by the 3=6.

- The name ‘Sonderklasse’ differentiated the car from the previous model which had been known as the ‘Meisterklasse’. Both names had also been used for commercially successful DKWs in the 1930s. Sonderklasse is a German verbal concatenation that does not translate comfortably into English: it is based on the word ‘Sonder’ of which one translation is ‘special’, linked to the word ‘Klasse’ which translates as ‘class’, or category’.
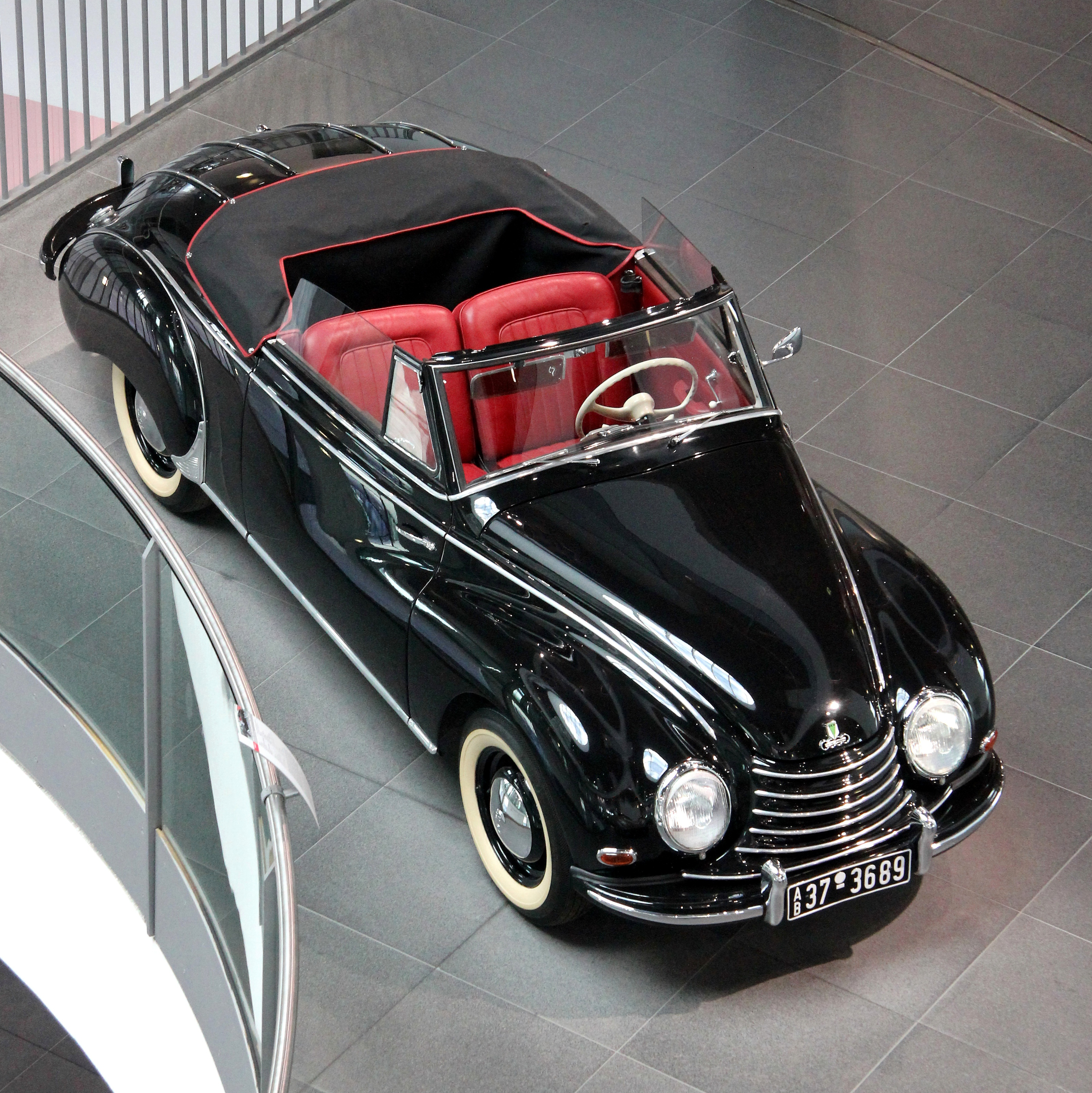
- 1953 DKW 3=6 F91 Cabriolet
  The name ‘3=6’ started out as an advertising slogan, but by the time of the 1955 face lift (for the 1956 model year), the name was to the fore, and the car was advertised as the ‘Large 3=6’ (Großer 3=6) differentiating it from the earlier version which already carried the script ‘3=6’ ahead of the door on its left side. The point of the advertising slogan was to highlight an equivalence between the car's two stroke three cylinder engine and a four stroke six cylinder engine. The underlying logic was that with the two-stroke cycle there is engine power produced by a combustion within each cylinder for every rotation of the crankshaft: with the four-stroke cycle there is power produced by a combustion within each cylinder only for each alternate rotation of the crankshaft. Thus it was asserted that the two-stroke engine was working twice as hard per rotation of the engine. In terms of torque the two-stroke system does indeed appear to have conferred substantial benefits when compared to a four-stroke engine of similar size, but in terms of power much of the theoretical energy gain in terms of power output seems to have been dissipated as additional heat which in turn required a larger energy consuming cooling fan, all of which made the arrangement rather noisy when placed just ahead of the driver and front-seat passenger.
- The name F91 was the factory project number of the car. ‘F’ stood for ‘Frontantrieb’ (Frontwheel drive). The F91 was an evolution from the DKW F9 which had been a prototype presented in 1938, planned for production at Auto Union's Zwickau plant from 1940. By 1950 the F9 itself had been made production ready and was being produced as the IFA F9 in Zwickau, so that name was in practice not available to ‘old’ Auto Union's western successor. The DKW F91 was replaced by the F93 followed by the F94, their names also taken from factory project numbers. Because the other names have proved increasingly unfathomable, the names F91, F93 and F94 are the ones commonly used retrospectively.

It was perhaps in recognition that any perceived marketing advantages available from the unconventional namings had been exhausted, that from 1958 the car was sold simply as the DKW 900 (in the USA only), the name being now conventionally based on the car's approximate engine displacement. The successor model, already in production in 1957, also benefited from this less challenging nomenclature.

== The bodies ==
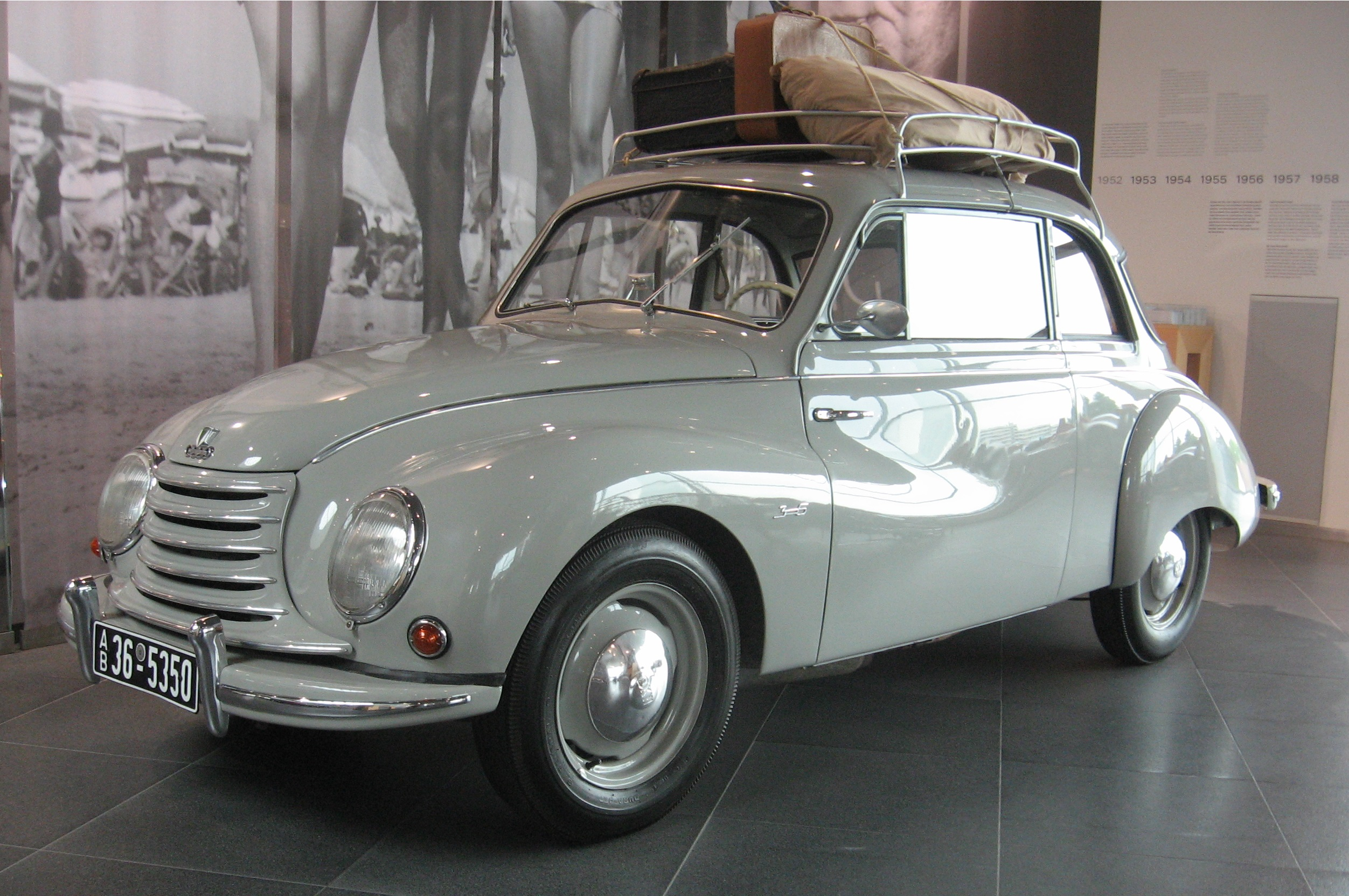
The DKW F91 on display at the Audi Museum in ingolstadt

The F91 was presented as a two-door saloon with front opening doors which presumably facilitated access. A ‘pillarless’ Coupe version, first seen in 1953, was produced from 1954, as well as a Cabriolet, bodied by Osnabrück coach builders Karmann. In addition there was a three-door estate version, called the ‘Universal’, which continued to be offered unchanged until 1956.

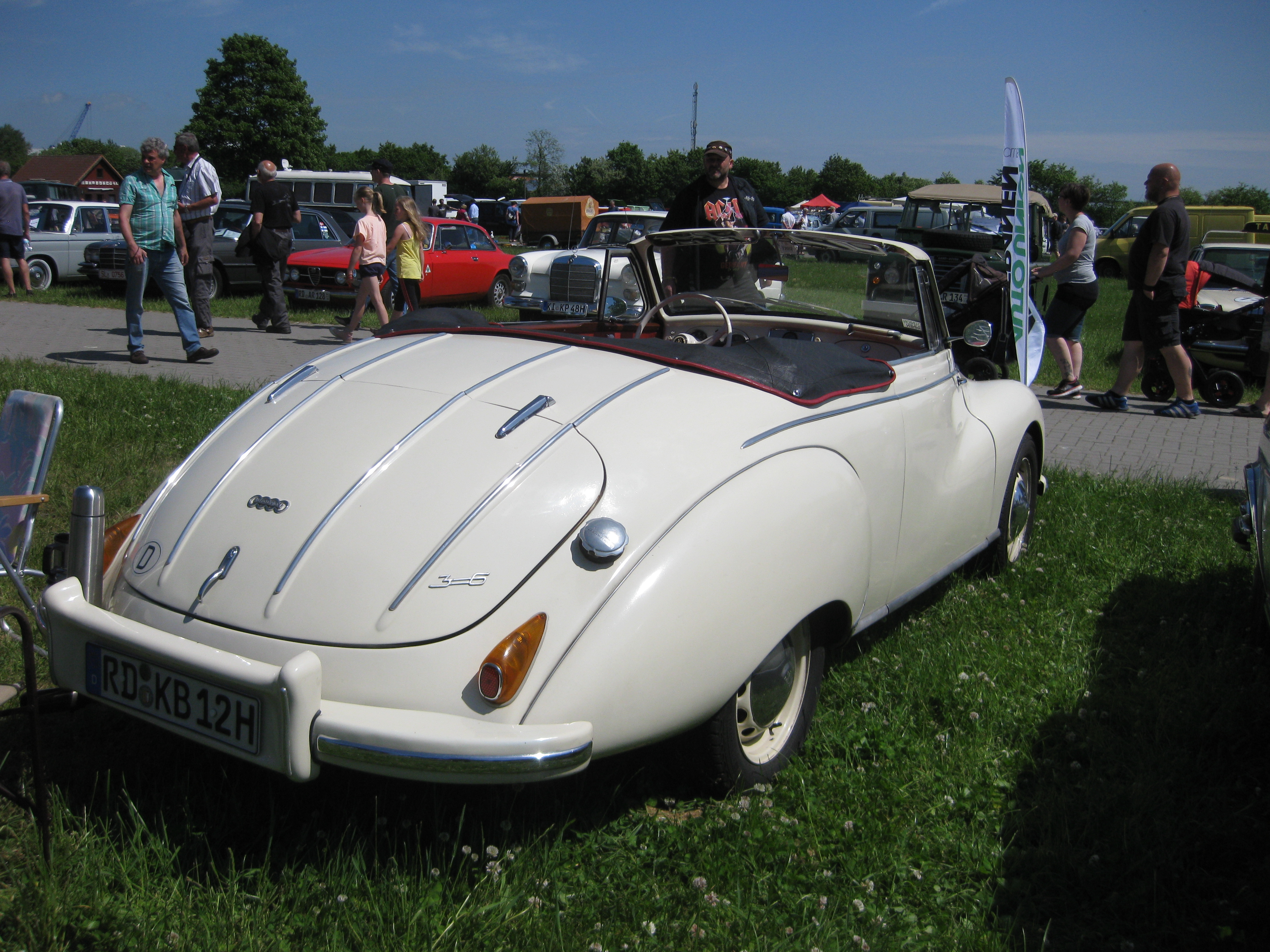
The cabriolet version of the F93 was only available for the 1956 model year.

Modifications came progressively. The coupe version had been launched with a ‘panoramic’ three piece wrap around back window, and in the back end of 1954 a similar wrap-around back window appeared on the two-door saloon. Advertising highlighted such features as a fuel gauge and an interior light that could be set to come on automatically when the door was opened.

1955 saw the launch of the F93 version (for the 1956 model year), also known as the Big DKW 3=6. There were three production series for the Big DKW 3=6:

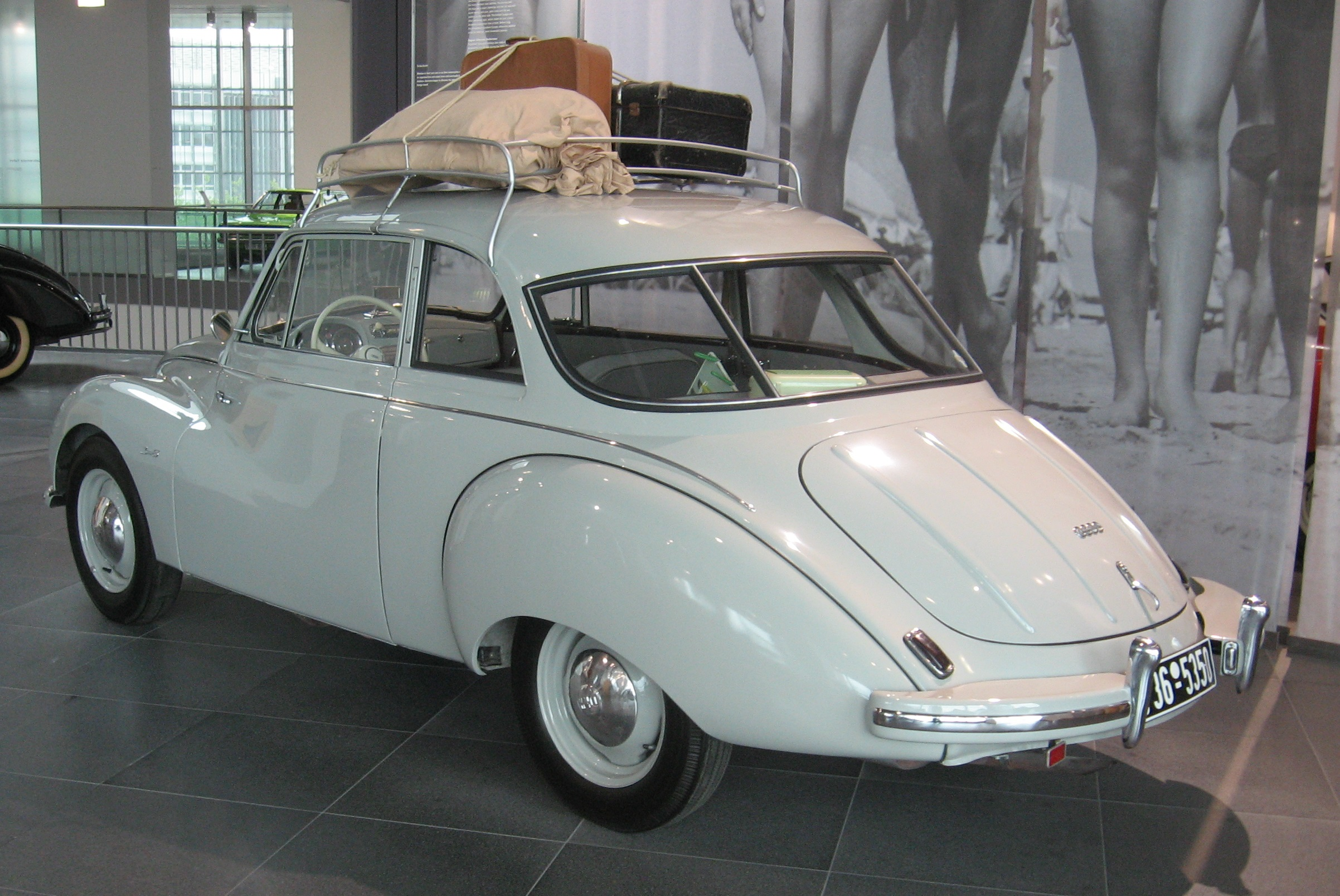
The panoramic three-piece rear window introduced on the F91

1st series: Model 1956, produced from September 1955 to September 1956 (Chassis number 500 021 to 546 035);

2nd series: Model 1957, produced from October 1956 to September 1957 (Chassis no. 546 036 to 588 410);

3rd series: Model 1958, produced from September 1957 to August 1959 (Chassis number 588 411 to 693 753).

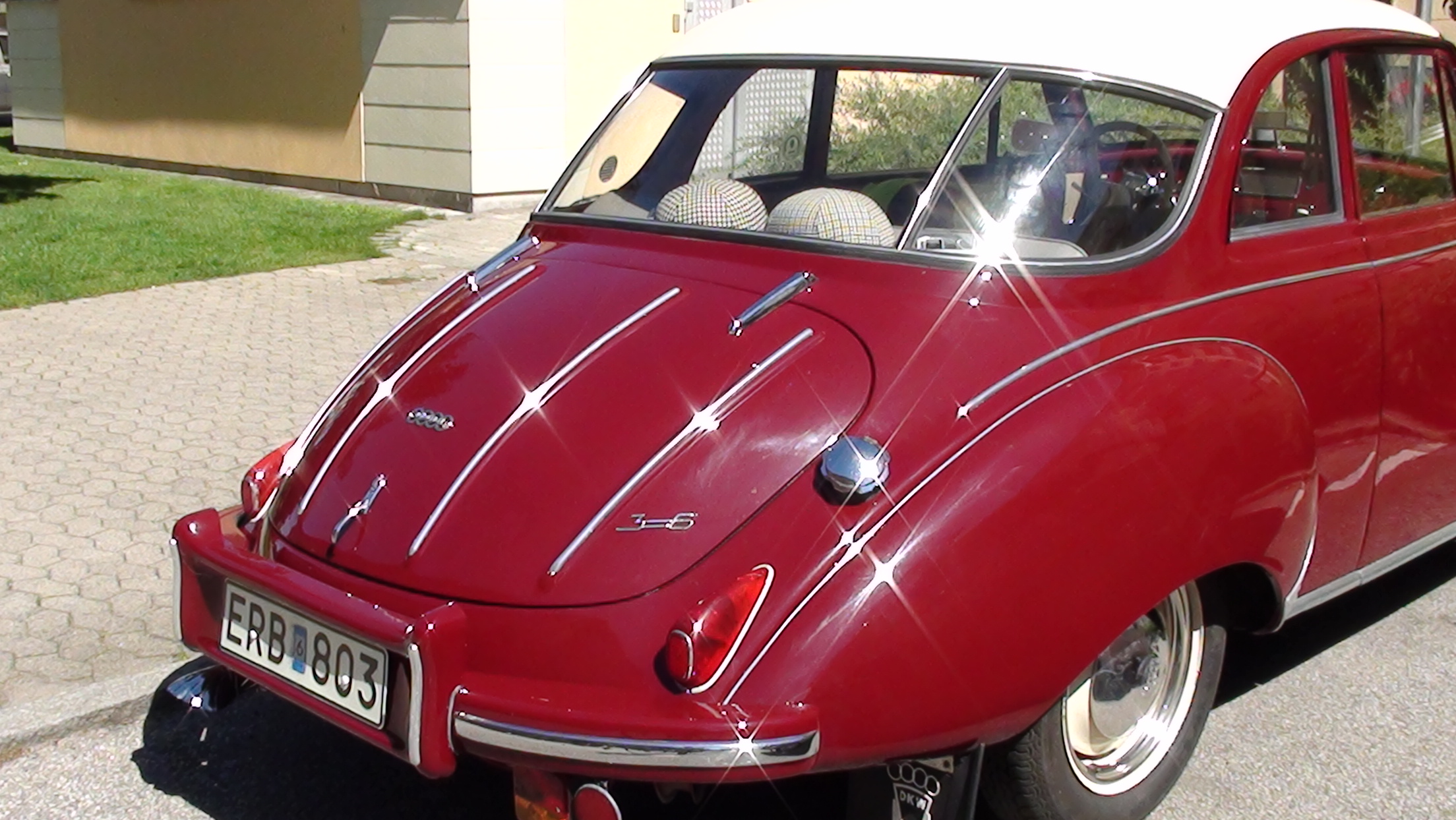
The "Big DKW" F93 featured the same panoramic rear window as the F91, but was a wider car with a number of improvements. This style of bootlid handle was used only for 1956 and 1957 models.

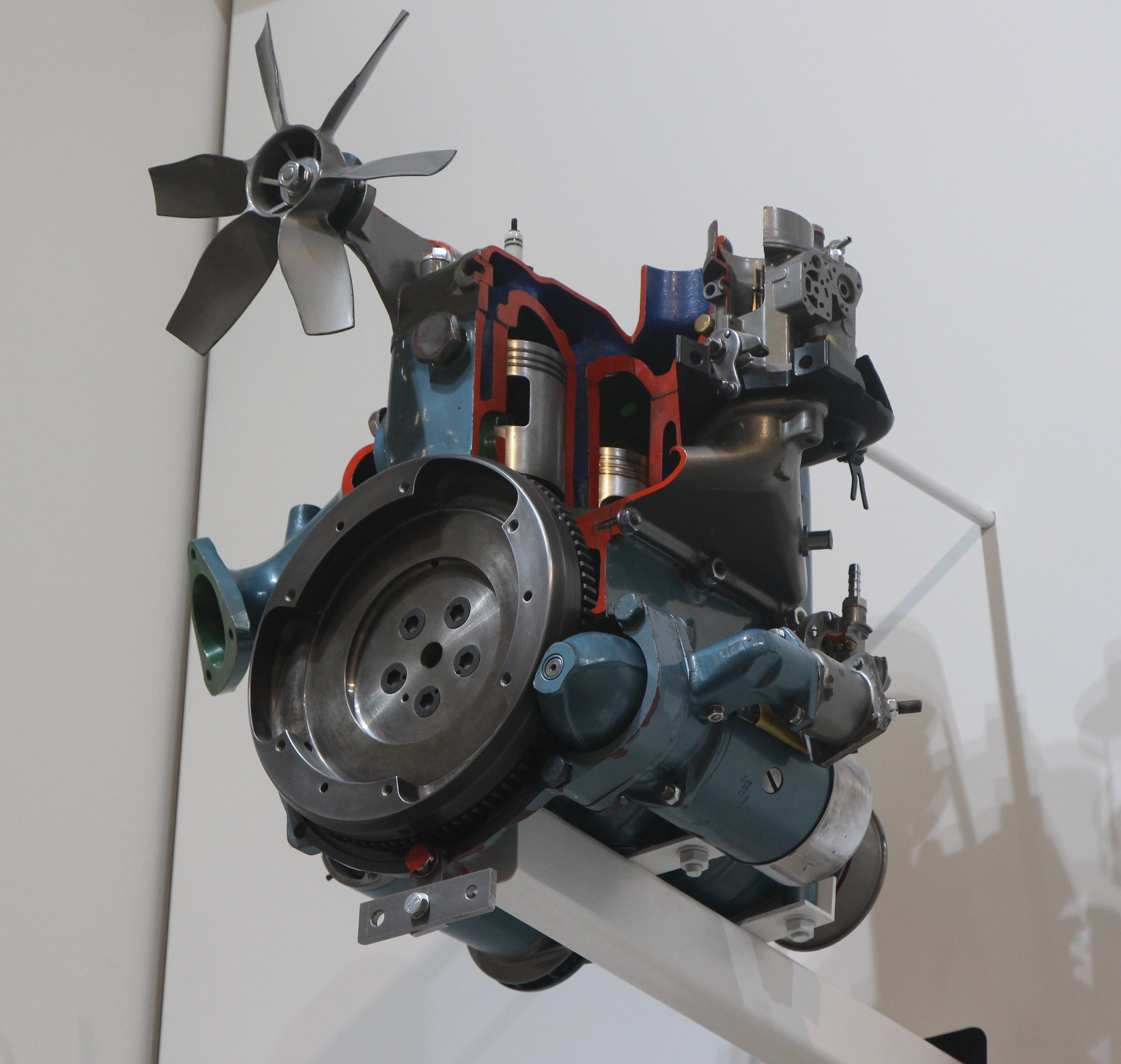
DKW 3=6 engine, 1956

The Big DKW 3=6 shared the 235-centimetre (92.5 in) wheel-base of the F91, but was slightly longer, wider and taller. The track was also increased by 10 centimetres (3.9 in). In place of horizontal metal slats, the new model featured an oval shaped front grille containing five horizontal metal coloured slats. The oval grille was modified again in 1957 when the slats were replaced by a chrome coloured grid design. Inside there were improvements to the instrumentation and the heating, as well as a modest increase in power to 40 bhp.

The DKW Monza which appeared in 1956 was essentially a DKW F93 under its (light-weight plastic) skin.

In 1956, with the introduction of the F94 version of the car, a four-door version finally became available. The four-door saloon's wheel-base was extended by 10 centimetres (3.9 in) over that of the two door: advertising continued to emphasize the DKW's class leading interior spaciousness. 1956 was also the year when the F91 ‘Universal’ estate version (the F91S) was replaced by the F94U Universal: it now incorporated many of features introduced two years earlier on the saloons. The F94 four door saloon and F94 Universal shared the same chassis.

== DKW in Brazil ==
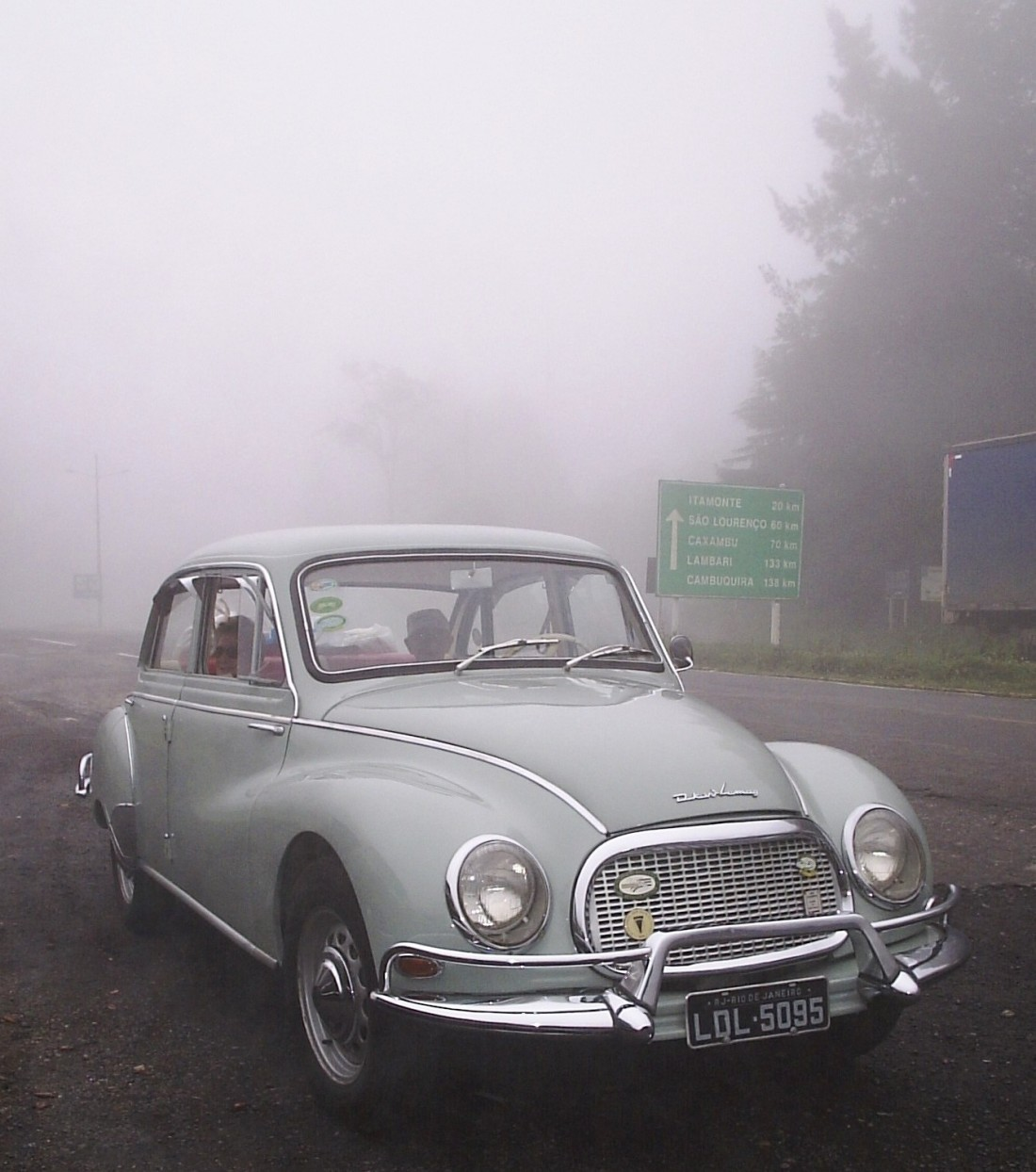
The Brazilian DKW-Vemag Belcar

Auto Union cars were also very popular in South America, where a number of special types based on the DKW 3=6 were manufactured in Brazil under licence by VEMAG from 1956 to 1967. Models sold were the DKW Belcar sedan, the Vemaguet station wagon, and the Fissore, a two-door coupe with a smooth designed body and elegant appointments, which resembled in general terms the DKW F102. The F94 line made by DKW-Vemag was equipped with doors hinged at the front (from 1964) and four headlights (in 1967). Altogether about 109,343 cars were built in Brazil.

== Technical ==
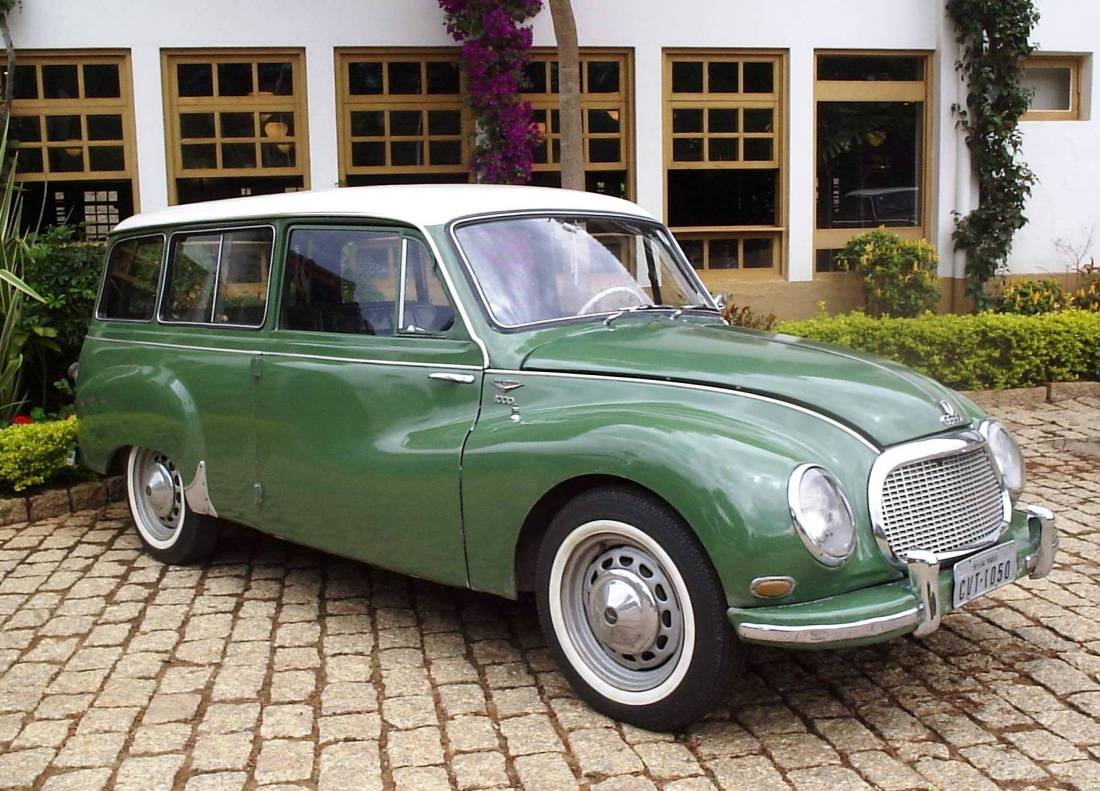
The Brazilian version of the DKW F94U Universal, also known as the Vemaguet

The 896 cc three cylinder engine provided at launch a claimed 34 bhp (25 kW). Following the company's pioneering work in the 1930s, the car had a front-wheel drive configuration which meant there was no bulky driveshaft running through the passenger cabin. The water cooled engine was installed longitudinally above the front wheels – the first appearance of the longitudinal "overhung" engine layout which DKW's successor – Audi – still uses to the present day, but the radiator was located not ahead of the engine but between the engine and the passenger cabin.

The gearbox, controlled by a column mounted lever, was a three speed manual system coupled with a free-wheel device: in Autumn 1953 a four speed box was offered as an option. In late 1956, a four speed gearbox became standard, with all but the first gear, fully synchronised. 1956 saw a further transmission advance with the availability of a Saxomat automatic centrifugal clutch on the DKW.

The F93 version launched in 1955 (for the 1956 model year) now boasted power output increased to 38 bhp (28 kW). That increased further to 40 bhp (30 kW) in 1957. The F93 also incorporated a strengthened chassis and improvements to the suspension and braking system.

== Technical specification ==
Technical data DKW 3=6 / Sonderklasse (Manufacturer's figures except where stated)
DKW 3=6	F91 (2-door saloon data)	F93 2-door saloon	F93 2-door pillarless coupé F93 Karmann cabriolet	F94 4-door saloon	F94U ‘Universal’ 3-door estate	Monza 2-door lightweight sportscar
Produced:	1953–1955	1955–1959	1955–1959	1957–1959	1957–1959	1956–1958
Engine:	3-cylinder-inline engine (two-stroke), longitudinally front-mounted					
Bore x Stroke:	71 mm x 76 mm (max bore 74mm)					
Displacement:	896 cc					
Max. Power at rpm:	34 hp (25 kW) at 4000	38 hp (28 kW) at 4250	40 hp (30 kW) at 4250	40 hp (30 kW) at 4250	40 hp (30 kW) at 4250	40–55 hp (30–41 kW) at 4250
Max. Torque at rpm:	–	71.1 N⋅m (52.4 lb⋅ft) at 3000	73.6 N⋅m (54.3 lb⋅ft) at 3500	73.6 N⋅m (54.3 lb⋅ft) at 3500	73.6 N⋅m (54.3 lb⋅ft) at 3500	73.6 N⋅m (54.3 lb⋅ft) at 3500
Compression Ratio:	6.5 : 1	7.25 : 1	7.5 : 1	7.5 : 1	7.5 : 1	7.5 : 1
Fuel feed:	single Solex 40BIC (later 40ICB) carburetor fed by a Solex vacuum fuel pump and intake silencer type air cleaner with "wet" type element					
Valvetrain:	No valvetrain, but porting is accomplished by Schnuerle porting (or Schnürle porting)					
Cooling:	Water by thermosiphon					
Gearbox:	3-speed-manual with freewheel device: column mounted lever control & front-wheel drive. 4 speed manual from 1953. Top three gears are synchronised. Optional Saxomat automatic centrifugal clutch from 1956.					
Electrical system:	6 volt (battery 60AH recharged by generator Bosch LJG EH 160/6) Ignition firing order 1-2-3 with triple 120 deg-offset contact breakers (on a mechanical advance governor mechanism) and triple ignition coils firing three Bosch M175 or 225 spark plugs at either 5mm BTDC (up to 1956), 4mm BTDC (up to and incl 1957) or 3.5mm BTDC (1958/59)					
Front suspension:	Independent suspension above, transverse leaf spring below, wishbone					
Rear suspension::	High-location transverse leaf spring guided by Panhard rod – rigid axle "Schwebeachse"					
Brakes:	4-wheel unassisted hydraulic drums by Auto Union/ATE with 678 cm^{2} of area providing 6.8 m / s2 retardation with 60 kg of applied pressure.					
Steering:	Rack & pinion with divided track rod					
Body structure:	Separate steel body on box-frame chassis					
Dry weight:	870 kg (1,920 lb)	930 kg (2,050 lb)	950 kg (2,090 lb)	970 kg (2,140 lb)	950 kg (2,090 lb)	820 kg (1,810 lb)
Track front/ rear:	1,190 mm (47 in) 1,250 mm (49 in)	1,290 mm (51 in) 1,350 mm (53 in)	1,290 mm (51 in) 1,350 mm (53 in)	1,290 mm (51 in) 1,350 mm (53 in)	1,290 mm (51 in) 1,350 mm (53 in)	1,290 mm (51 in) 1,350 mm (53 in)
Wheelbase:	2,350 mm (93 in)	2,350 mm (93 in)	2,350 mm (93 in)	2,450 mm (96 in)	2,450 mm (96 in)	2,350 mm (93 in)
Length:	4,200 mm (170 in)	4,225 mm (166.3 in)	4,225 mm (166.3 in)	4,325 mm (170.3 in)	4,170 mm (164 in)	4,015–4,090 mm (158.1–161.0 in)
Width:	1,600 mm (63 in)	1,695 mm (66.7 in)	1,695 mm (66.7 in)	1,695 mm (66.7 in)	1,640 mm (65 in)	1,660–1,710 mm (65–67 in)
Height:	1,450 mm (57 in)	1,465 mm (57.7 in)	1,465 mm (57.7 in)	1,490 mm (59 in)	1,565 mm (61.6 in)	1,350 mm (53 in)
Turning circle:	–	11.6 m / 38' 0⅓"	11.6 m / 38' 0⅓"	12.0 m / 39' 4⅓"	12.0 m / 39' 4⅓"	11.6 m / 38' 0⅓"
Tyre/Tire sizes:	5.60–15“	5.60–15“	5.60–15“	5.60–15“	5.60–15“	5.60–15“
Top speed:	115 km/h (71 mph)	123 km/h (76 mph)	123 km/h (76 mph)	115 km/h (71 mph)	115 km/h (71 mph)	130 km/h (81 mph) – 135 km/h (84 mph)
Fuel Consumption:	8.0 litres per 100 kilometres (35 mpg_{‑imp}; 29 mpg_{‑US})	10.0 litres per 100 kilometres (28 mpg_{‑imp}; 24 mpg_{‑US})	10.0 litres per 100 kilometres (28 mpg_{‑imp}; 24 mpg_{‑US})	10.5 litres per 100 kilometres (27 mpg_{‑imp}; 22 mpg_{‑US})	10.5 litres per 100 kilometres (27 mpg_{‑imp}; 22 mpg_{‑US})	10.0 litres per 100 kilometres (28 mpg_{‑imp}; 24 mpg_{‑US})

== Competition ==
The DKW 3=6 was a campaigned very successfully in motorsport in the 1950s and early 1960s. Notable outright victories include the 1954 European Rally Championship at the hands of Walter Schlüter, as well the 1956 East African Coronation Safari (later known as the Safari Rally ) in the hands of Eric Cecil and Tony Vickers. The DKW 3=6 was driven in motorsport, by many notable drivers including Jim Clark, Tony Brooks, Sarel van der Merwe and Juan Manuel Fangio (1965 Interlagos, Brazil). In South Africa, in particular, sales were bolstered by the motorsport successes of Sarel van der Merwe Snr (father of Sarel van der Merwe), Coenraad Spamer and Tom Campher. In 1957 alone, the list of South African motorsport events won by the DKW 3=6 was sizeable – including the 1957 Protea Trial, 1957 Lourenco Marques Rally and the 1957 Vaal Gold Cup Rally.

The DKW Monza (based on the DKW 3=6), set five world records in 1956 in the displacement class up to 1.1 litres with an average speed of almost 140 km/h (86.9 mph).

- 4,000 miles with an average speed of 140.839 km/h (87.513 mph)
- 48 hours with an average speed of 140.961 km/h (87.589 mph)
- 5,000 miles with an average speed of 138.656 km/h (86.157 mph)
- 10,000 miles with an average speed of 139.453 km/h (86.652 mph)
- 72 hours with an average speed of 139.459 km/h (86.656 mph)
