= Borgward Isabella =

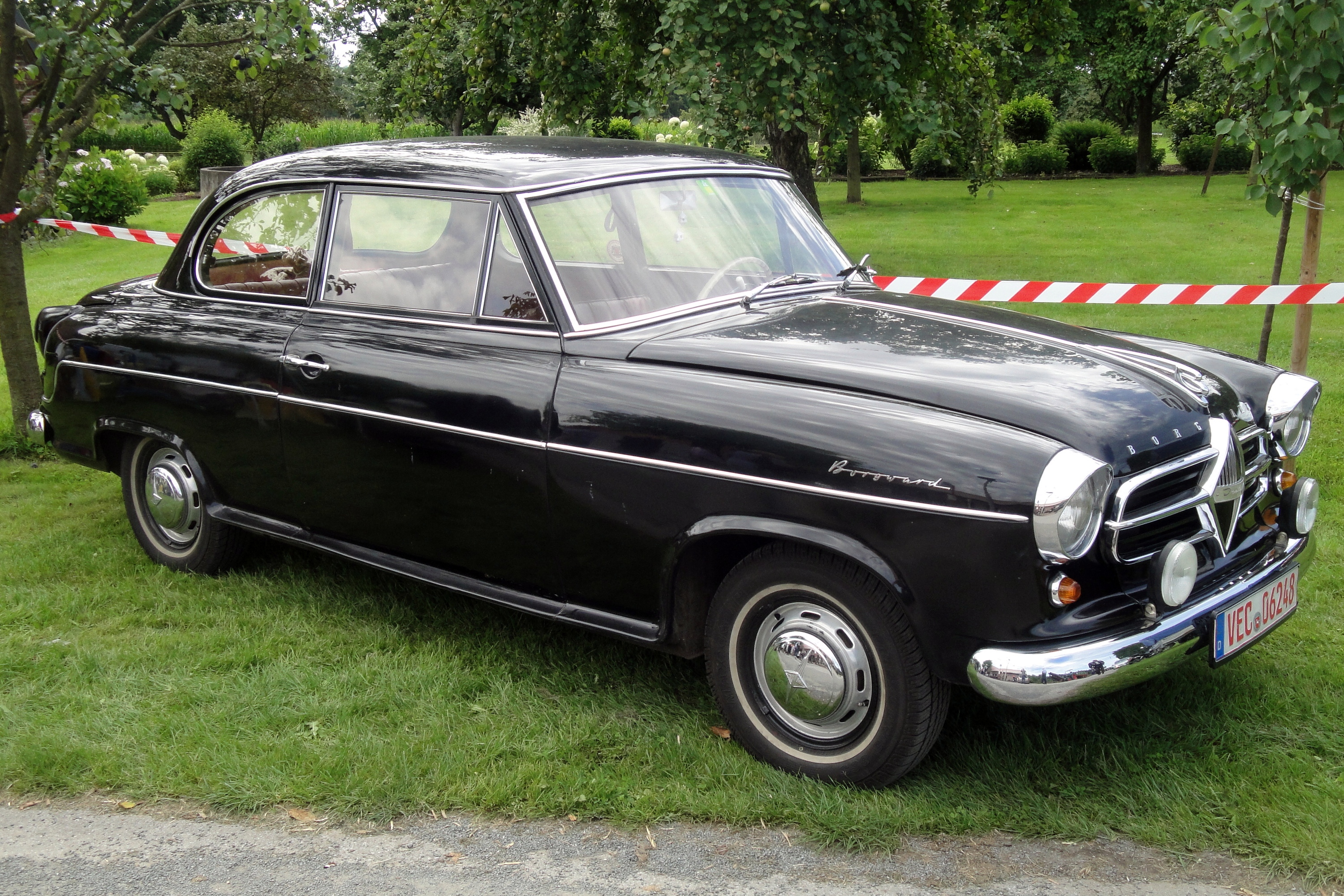
- Borgward Isabella Saloon

Overview
- Manufacturer: Carl F. W. Borgward GmbH
- Also called: Borgward Hansa Isabella
- Production: June 1954–1962
- Assembly: West Germany: Bremen-Sebaldsbrück; Indonesia: Surabaya; Mexico: Monterrey; Argentina: Buenos Aires

Body and chassis
- Body style: 2 door saloon cabriolet station wagon coupe (2+2) cabriolet (2+2); 2-door pickup
- Layout: FR layout

Powertrain
- Engine: 1493 cc 75hp straight-4
- Transmission: 4-speed manual

Dimensions
- Wheelbase: 2,600 mm (102.4 in)
- Length: 4,390 mm (172.8 in)
- Width: 1,705 mm (67.1 in)
- Height: 1,480 mm (58.3 in)
- Curb weight: 1,010 kg (2,230 lb)

Chronology
- Predecessor: Borgward Hansa 1800

The Borgward Isabella is an automobile which was manufactured by the Bremen based auto-manufacturer Carl F. W. Borgward GmbH from 1954 to 1962.

The Isabella was to have been marketed as the Borgward Hansa 1500 but the Isabella name was used on test vehicles and proved popular with engineering staff and media. The production car was subsequently renamed and only the first few hundred examples were built without Isabella badging. Hansa badging was also used through to 1957.

Despite its aspirational positioning in the marketplace, the Isabella had a smaller engine (and was marginally shorter) than its immediate predecessor, the Borgward Hansa. Late in 1952, the firm had launched their six-cylinder Hansa 2400 model. The larger car never found many buyers; but in 1954, it made commercial sense to keep the two models from competing too directly with each other.

== At launch ==
In 1954, its first year of production, a total of 11,150 Isabellas were produced, an early indicator that commercially this would be the most successful Borgward ever. The early cars enjoyed an enthusiastic reception in the market place, but were afflicted by teething troubles that reflected a rushed development schedule.

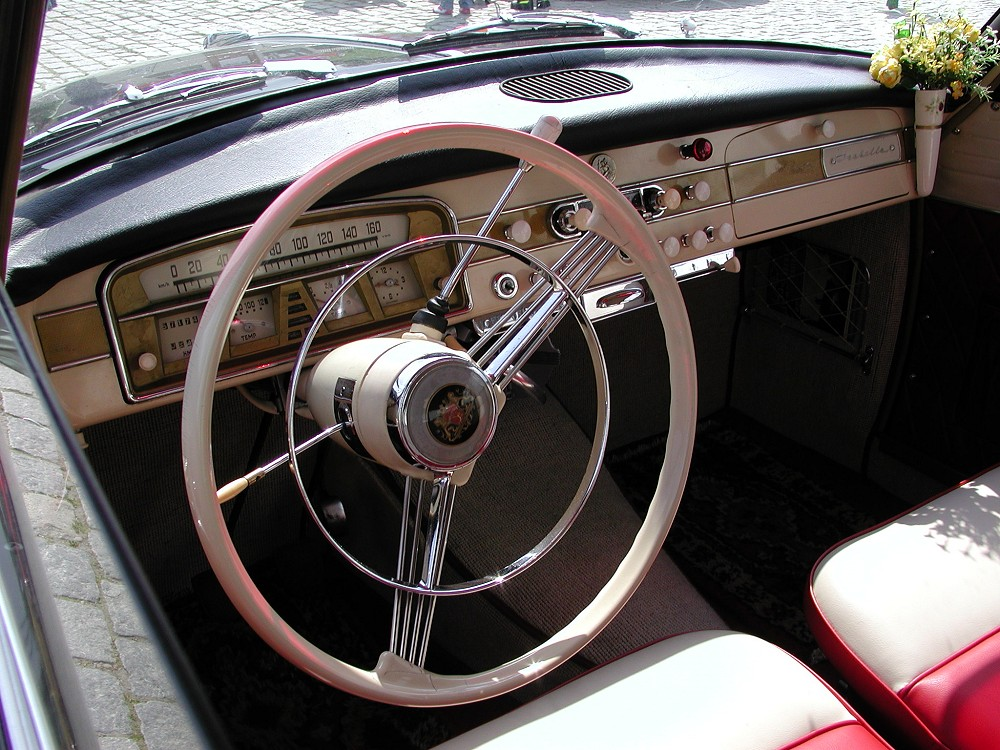
Borgward Isabella TS Deluxe interior

The advertised launch price of DM 7,265 was higher than that of competitor family sedans, the Opel Rekord and Ford Taunus, but significantly less than Mercedes-Benz was asking for their 180 model. In view of the car's spacious cabin and impressive performance, the pricing was perceived as competitive. A road test at launch reported a maximum speed of 130 km/h (81 mph) and fuel consumption of 8.4 L/100 km or 28 mpg. The testers described the modern structure of the car in some detail: they particularly liked the wide cabin with its large windows, and they commended the effectiveness of the brakes. The inclusion of a cigarette lighter and a clock also attracted favourable mention. Unlike the Mercedes 180 however, (and unlike its predecessor) the Isabella was only available with two doors.

The Isabella was constructed without a separate chassis, applying the monocoque technique which during the 1950s was becoming the norm. Like its predecessor, the car was designed with a modern ponton, three-box design, but the line of the Isabella was more curvaceous than that of the first Hansa, and the car’s body made greater use of chrome trim. Ground clearance was 6.9 inches.

The Isabella featured a swing axle at the back: it was supported by coil springs on all four wheels. The four-cylinder 1493 cc engine had a claimed power output of 60 bhp (45 kW), and was connected by means of a then innovative hydraulic clutch to the four-speed full synchromesh gear box. Gear changes were effected by means of a column-mounted lever.

== Variants ==
A year after presenting the sedan, Borgward presented the Isabella estate version.

Also introduced in 1955 was a two-door cabriolet, known as the Isabella TS and featuring a more powerful 75 bhp (56 kW) motor. Production of the cabriolet was contracted to the firm Karl Deutsch in Cologne: converting an early monocoque design to a cabriolet necessitated considerable modification in order to achieve the necessary structural rigidity, and the resulting cost was reflected in a much higher selling price for this version.

Initial sales volumes were not maintained. Responding to a sales decline of almost a third in 1955 and 1956, Carl Borgward decided to produce a restyled Isabella with a shortened roof line. The Borgward Isabella Coupé was developed, and the four hand built prototypes were well received by the press. Borgward gave one of these prototypes to his wife, Elisabeth, who would continue to drive it into the 1980s. Commercial production of the coupé, powered by the more powerful TS version of the engine first seen in the cabriolet, commenced in January 1957. The coupe appeared to have achieved its marketing objective of further distancing the Isabella’s image from similarly sized competitors from Opel and Ford. By 1958, the more powerful 75 bhp (56 kW) TS motor had also found its way into the more upmarket Isabella sedan and estate versions.

Vehicles were exported to several markets, including Australia, and New Zealand; ten were sold in Malaysia.

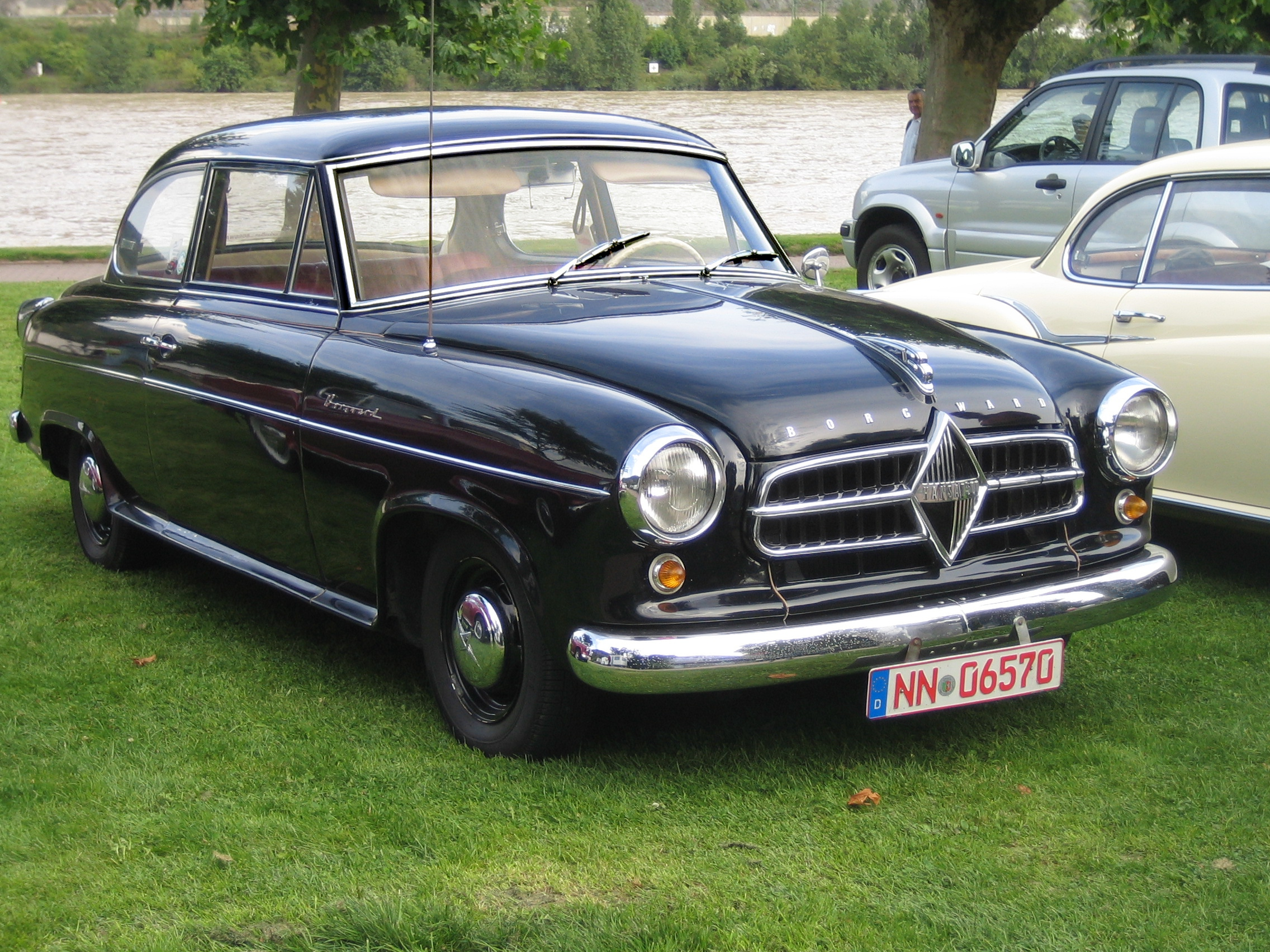
Borgward Hansa Isabella Saloon

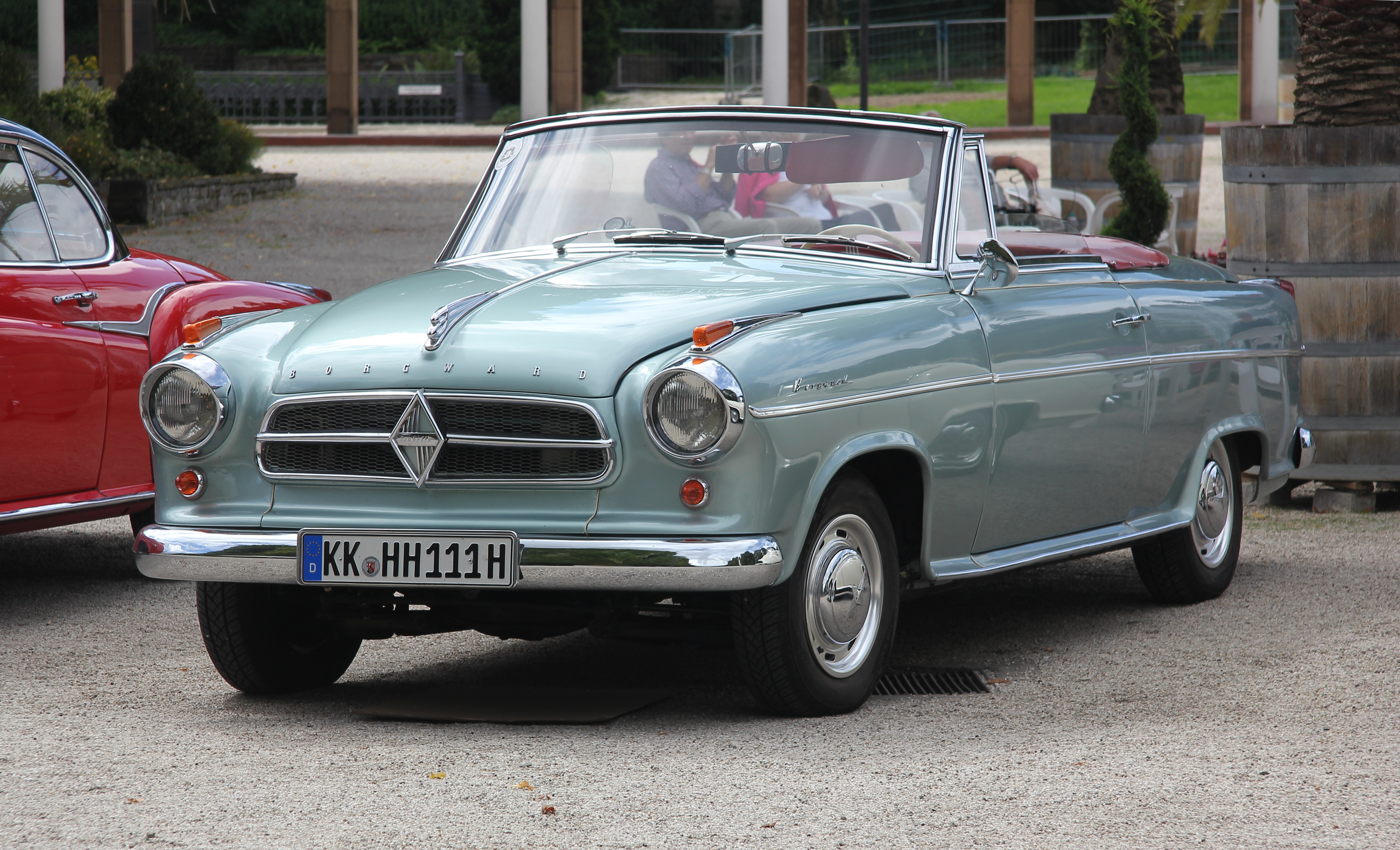
Borgward Isabella Cabriolet

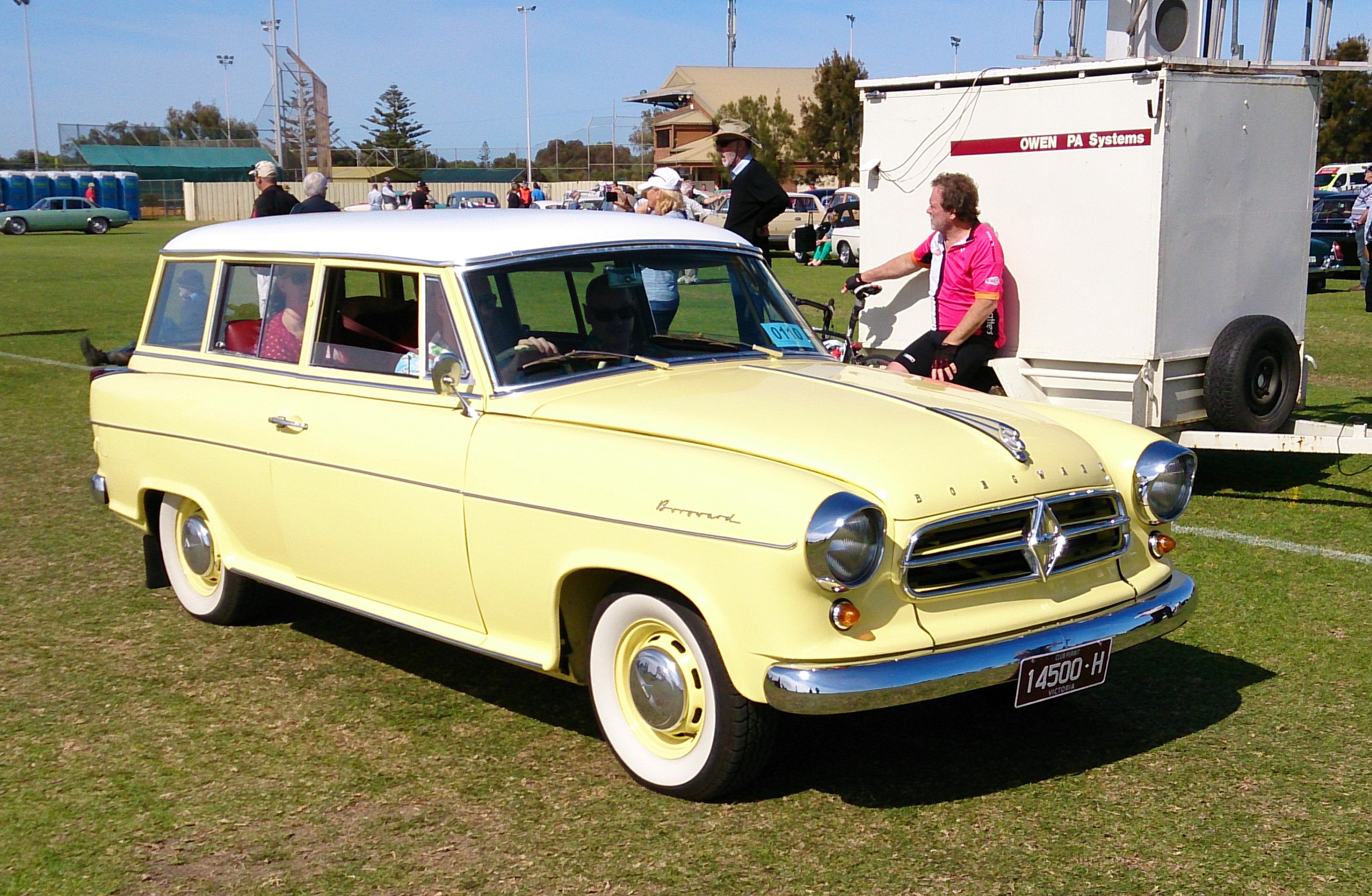
Borgward Isabella Combi 1959

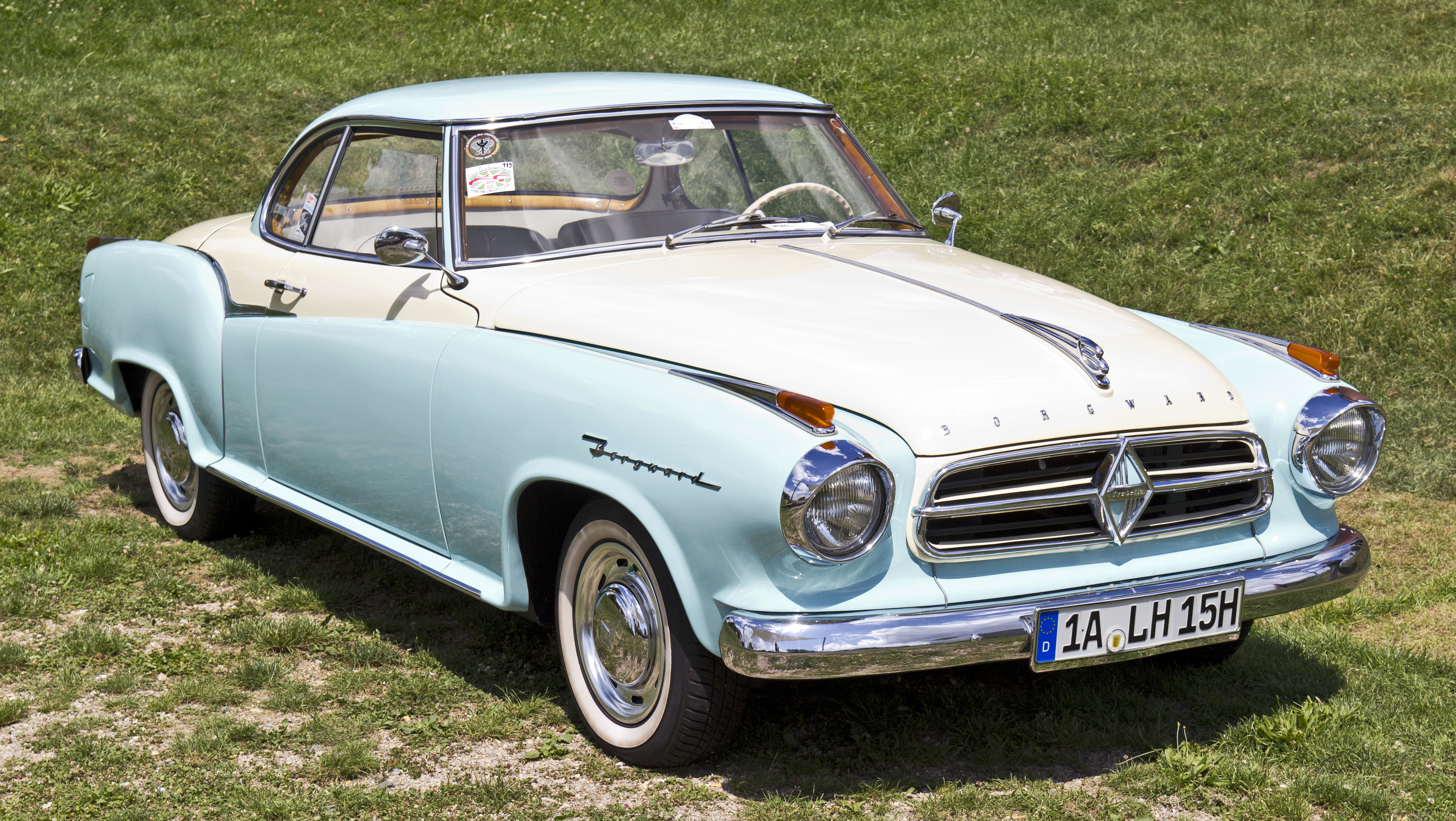
Borgward Isabella Coupé (2+2)

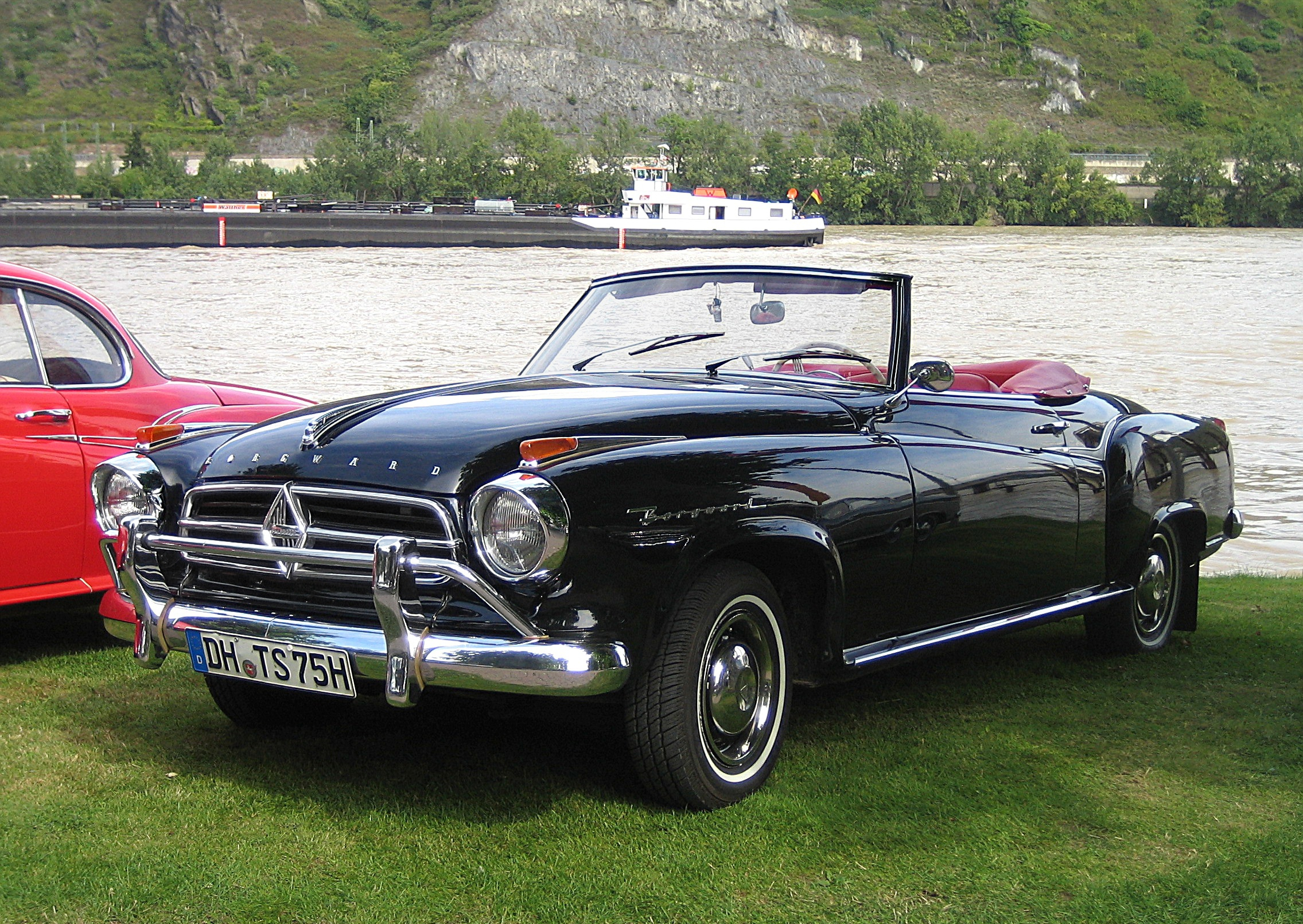
Borgward Isabella Cabriolet (2+2)

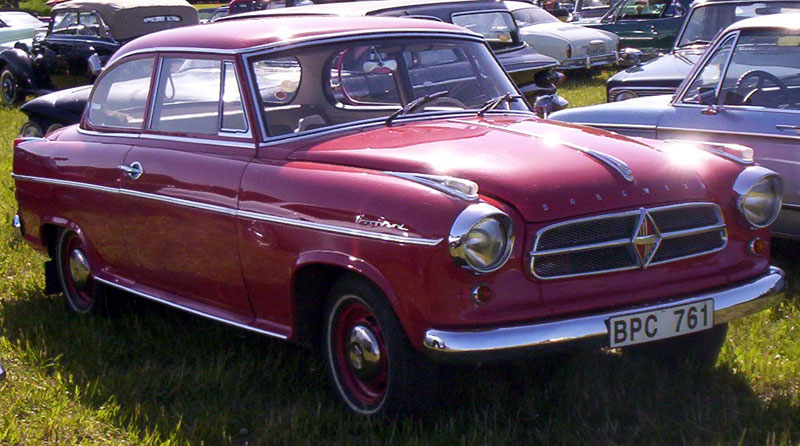
Borgward Isabella TS Saloon 1961

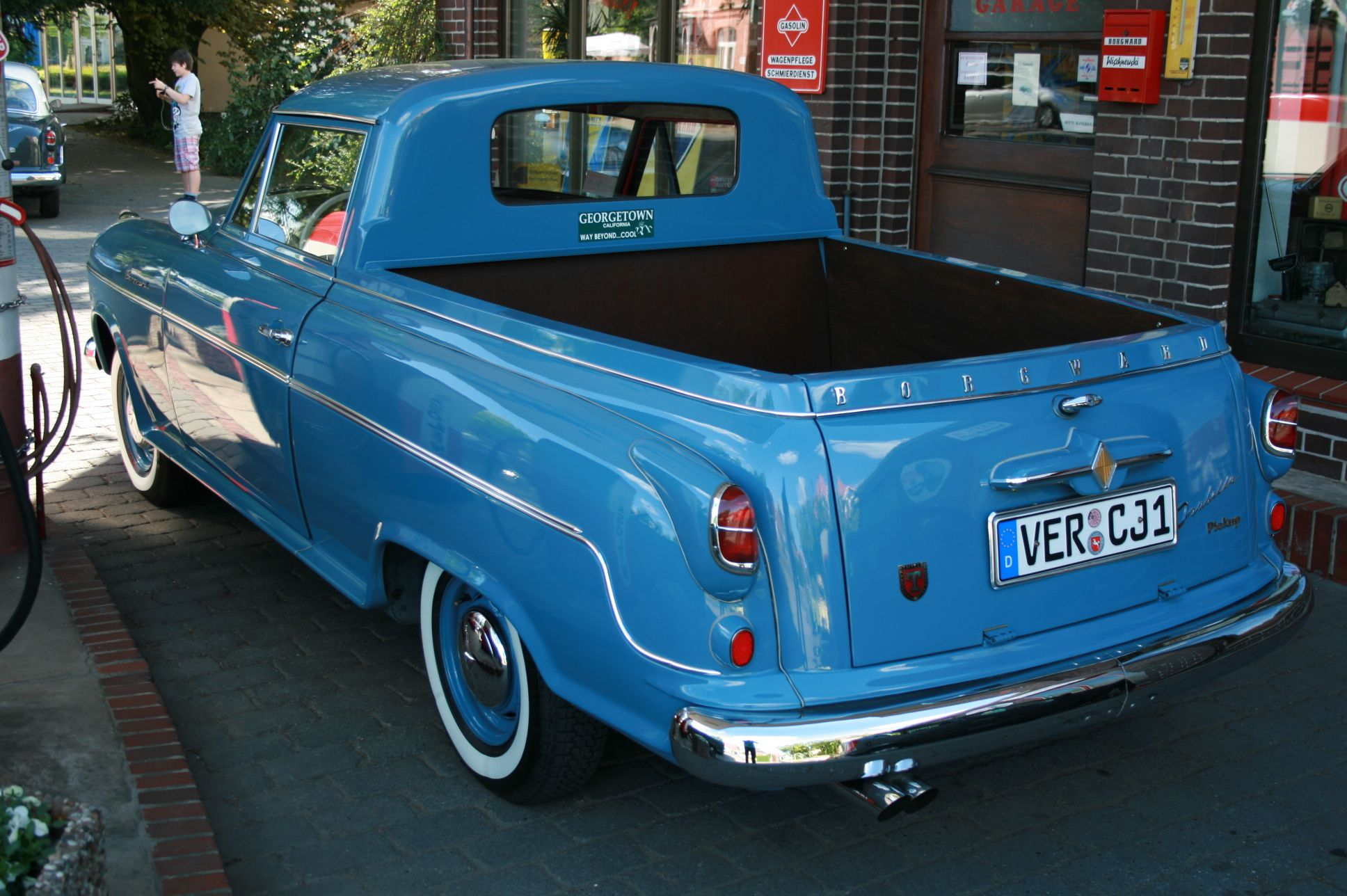
Borgward Isabella PickUp

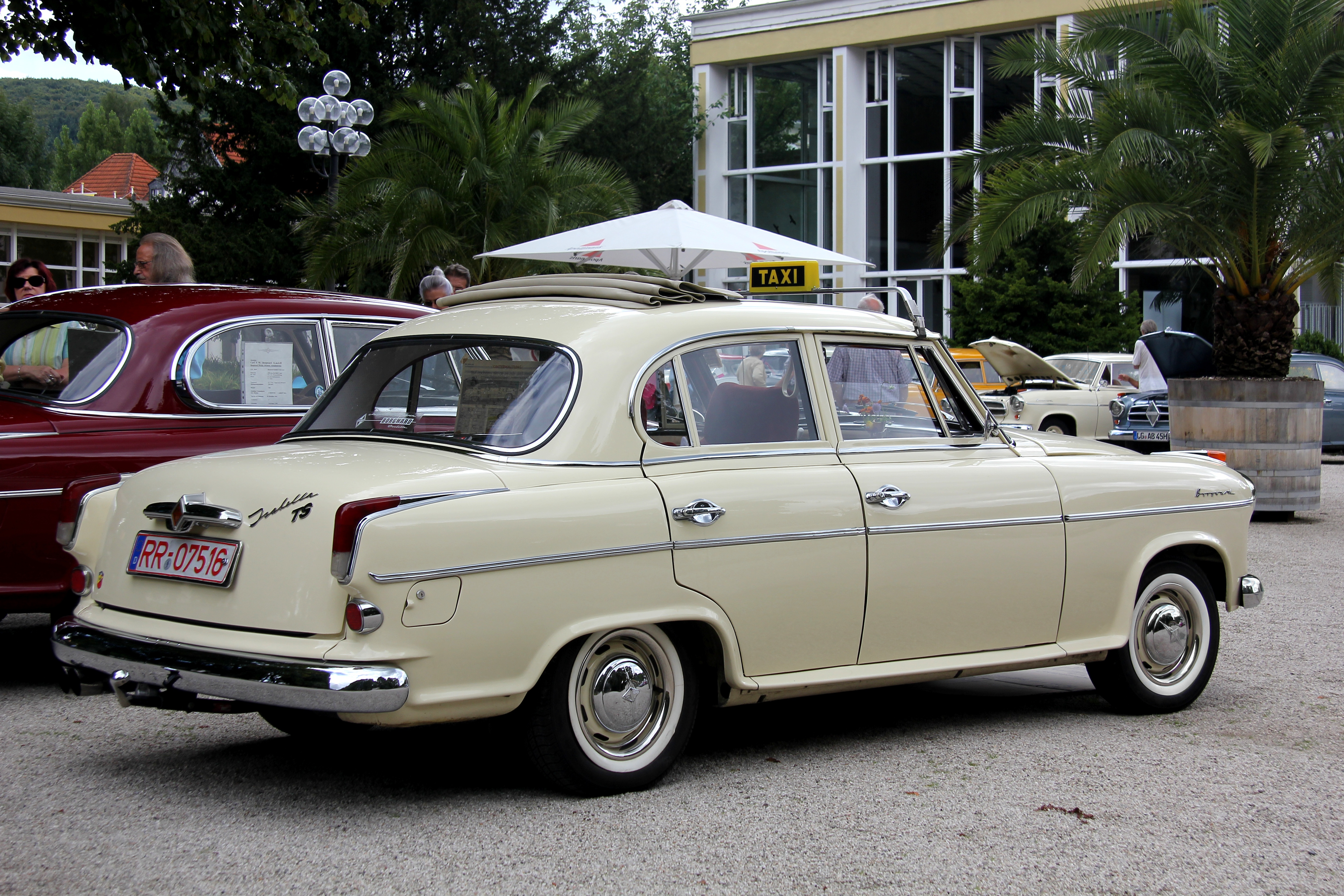
One of probably two 4 door Borgward Isabellas

== In competition ==
English racing driver and tuner Bill Blydenstein raced a Borgward Isabella in the 1950s with some success.

== End of production ==
Borgward had many unsold Isabellas when it went bankrupt in 1961. Nevertheless, the model's production at the Bremen plant continued until 1962, suggesting that overstocking had not been restricted to finished vehicles. By the end, 202,862 Isabellas had rolled off the Borgward production line; overall, and despite being hit by falling demand in the economic slump that briefly hit Germany in the early 1960s, the car is believed to have been the firm's most lucrative model by a very considerable margin.

Borgward enjoyed a brief afterlife: the production line was sold and shipped to Mexico, where later during the 1960s the P100 (Big Six) was produced. In Argentina, the Isabella was manufactured from 1960 to 1963 by Dinborg, a local subsidiary of Borgward. 999 Isabellas were made in Buenos Aires. The Isabellas 2-door saloon/station wagon and B2500 truck (as well as Holden vehicles) were also assembled locally via CKD kits by PT Udatin at their production plant around the port of Tanjung Perak in Surabaya, Indonesia from 1955 until around 1970.

== Concept (2017) ==
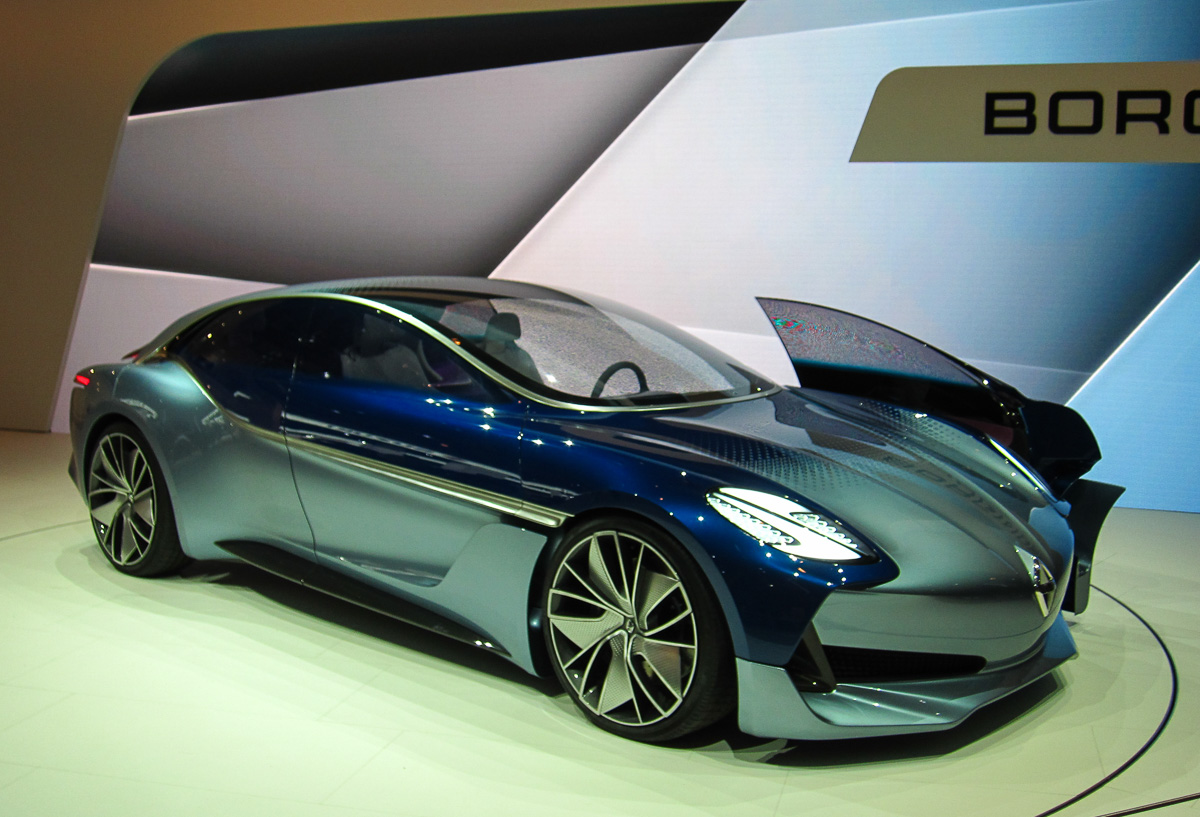
Borgward Isabella concept at IAA 2017

A Borgward Isabella concept was presented by Borgward Group at IAA 2017 as a four-door, four seat electric coupe. It has been designed under the direction of Anders Warming.
