= Borgward Hansa 1500 =

Borgward Hansa 1500 Borgward Hansa 1800
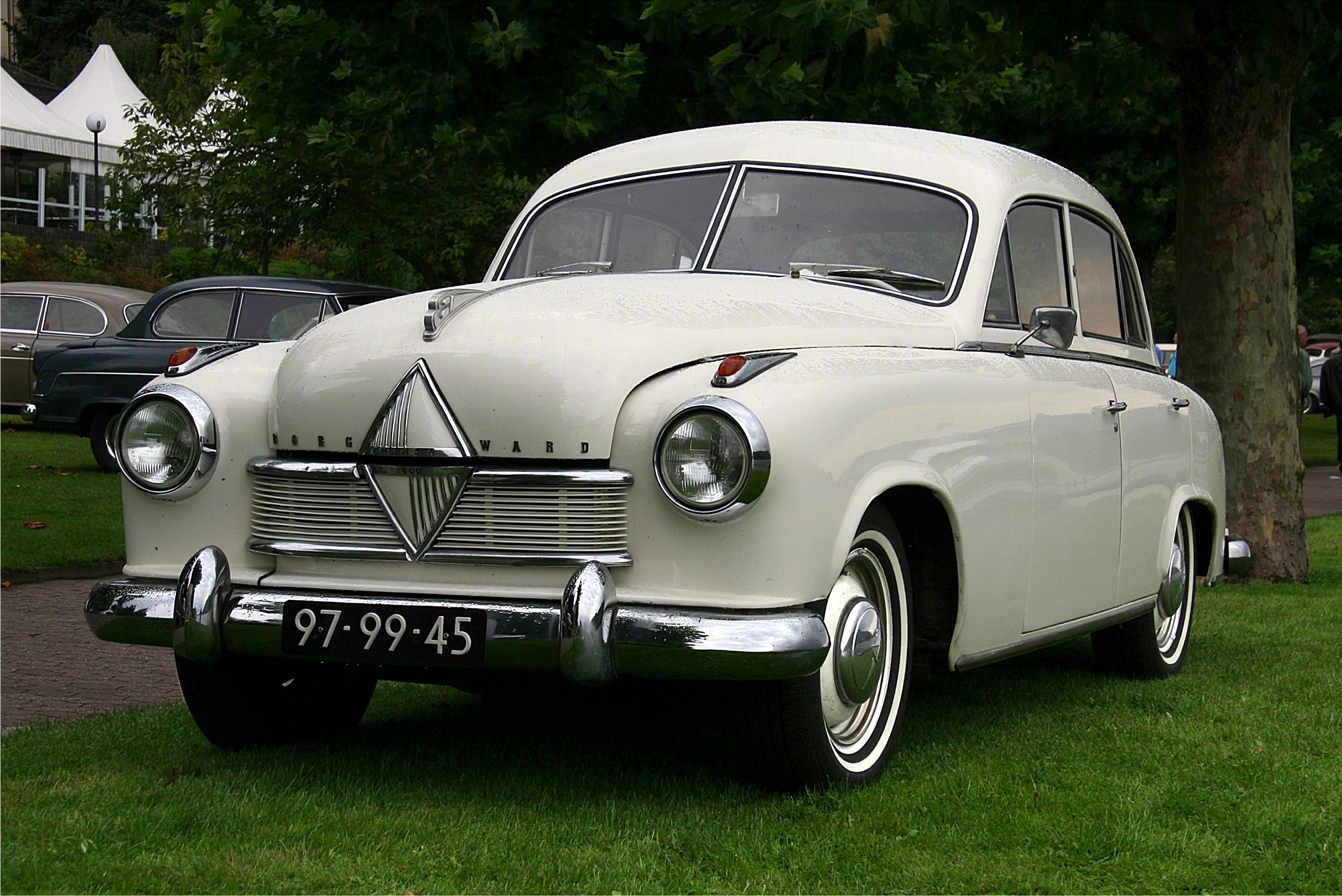
- Borgward Hansa 1800

Overview
- Manufacturer: Carl F. W. Borgward GmbH
- Production: October 1949–1954
- Assembly: West Germany: Bremen-Sebaldsbrück

Body and chassis
- Body style: 2/4-door saloon 2-door cabriolet 2-door station wagon 2-door panel van 2-door pickup truck
- Layout: FR layout

Powertrain
- Engine: 1498 cc I4 (1500); 1758 cc I4 (1800); 1758 cc diesel I4
- Transmission: 3-speed manual (1500); 4-speed manual (1800)

Dimensions
- Wheelbase: 2,600 mm (100 in)
- Length: 4,450 mm (175 in)
- Width: 1,620 mm (64 in)
- Height: 1,560 mm (61 in)
- Curb weight: 1,120–1,245 kg (2,469–2,745 lb)

Chronology
- Successor: Borgward Isabella

The Borgward Hansa 1500 is a medium-sized automobile manufactured by the Bremen based auto-manufacturer Carl F. W. Borgward GmbH from 1949 until 1954. It was first presented at the Geneva Motor Show in March 1949 and production commenced on 13 October 1949. The similar Hansa 1800 was introduced in 1952. The Hansa was replaced by the Borgward Isabella in 1954.

It is often seen as the first all new model launched by the German auto industry after the war. Introduced nearly four years before the better remembered "Ponton Mercedes" the Hansa featured the then revolutionary ponton, three-box design that subsequently became mainstream in Germany and across much of Europe.

The Borgward 1500 RS race car was derived from the Hansa 1500 engine.

== Hansa 1500 ==
The car was launched as a two- or four-door saloon with an all-steel body built around a central steel frame, which bears a resemblance to a 1949 Ford. The wings were fully integrated into the bodywork, and the passenger cabin filled the full width of the car. At a time when competitor vehicles from Opel Olympia and Mercedes-Benz W136 were still based on conventional looking prewar designs, the interior width of the Hansa, emphasized by the inclusion of bench seats both at the back and in the front, attracted favourable press comment. The car was seen as a genuine six-seater. Also noteworthy in 1949 was the separate lid that permitted the boot / trunk to be accessed from outside the car. At the other end, the bonnet / hood was hinged at the side and could be opened from either the left or the right side as necessary. Instead of traditional semaphore style direction indicators, the Hansa featured flashing lights for use as direction indicators, the flashing being replicated within the tri-functional rear lights which included within a single unit rear lights and brake lights along with the US style flashing direction indicators.

The driver was faced by a steering wheel linked to its central boss by three sets of four thin spoke like rods. The design of the steering wheel, reminiscent of the early Porsches, ensured minimal disruption of the view of the instruments behind it. Also behind the steering wheel was the column-mounted gear lever.

A two-door estate version and a five-seater two-door cabriolet were available along with a two-seater sports cabriolet. The cabriolets were both assembled by the coach builders Hebmüller in Wülfrath until May 1952. Rometsch showed a fastback two-door coupé variant called the Sport Coupé; the shape was not successful, with a tall bonnet, suicide doors, and a "dreary", downwards-sloping rear end. It sat on a shortened, 2,400 mm (94.5 in) wheelbase, but at twice the price of the more balanced looking 1500 Saloon only two examples were completed.

=== Engine, transmission and chassis ===
The Hansa was introduced with a 1498-cc four-cylinder OHV engine providing a claimed power output of 48 PS (35 kW). For 1952 the engine was modified to produce 52 PS (38 kW). A 66 PS (49 kW) output version of this engine was installed in the sports cabriolet. The Borgward engine had an unusual design where the intake manifold was on top the engine and came through the valve cover, along with the carburettor. Bill Blydenstein tuned several of these engines for racing with some success.

The column-mounted gear lever controlled a three-speed gear box or a 2-speed automatic gear box (with a gear-indicator on the column as visible on the photo).

The wheels were independently sprung, the rear wheels being attached to a swing axle and supported by springs with hydraulic shock absorbers. All four wheels were connected to the foot brake via a hydraulic system, while the hand brake was a mechanical one operating on the rear wheels.

== Hansa 1800 ==
1952 saw the introduction of the faster Borgward Hansa 1800, with a 1758 cc 4-cylinder engine producing 60 PS (44 kW). The Hansa 1800 benefited from a four-speed gear box, with synchromesh between the top two ratios. The front direction indicators which on the Hansa 1500 had been located beneath the headlights, now migrated to the top of the front wings on the Hansa 1800.

As before, the two- and four-door saloons were complemented by cabriolet and estate versions.

The next year the Hansa 1800 became available with a diesel engine of the same capacity as the petrol / gasoline fuelled unit, but with a power output of 42 PS (31 kW).

An 1800 diesel saloon version tested by the British The Motor magazine in 1954 had a top speed of 68 mph (109 km/h) and could accelerate from 0-50 mph (80 km/h) in 27.9 seconds. A fuel consumption of 45.6 miles per imperial gallon (6.19 L/100 km; 38.0 mpg_{‑US}) was recorded. The test car cost £1493 including taxes in the United Kingdom.

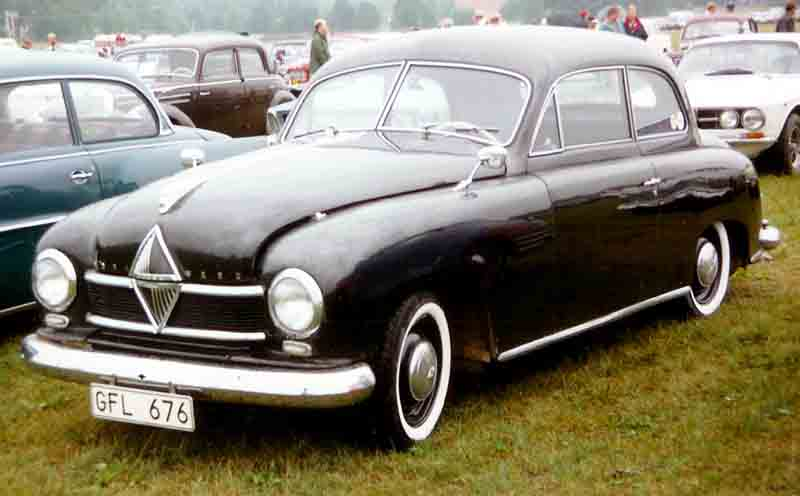
Borgward Hansa 1500 2-door saloon

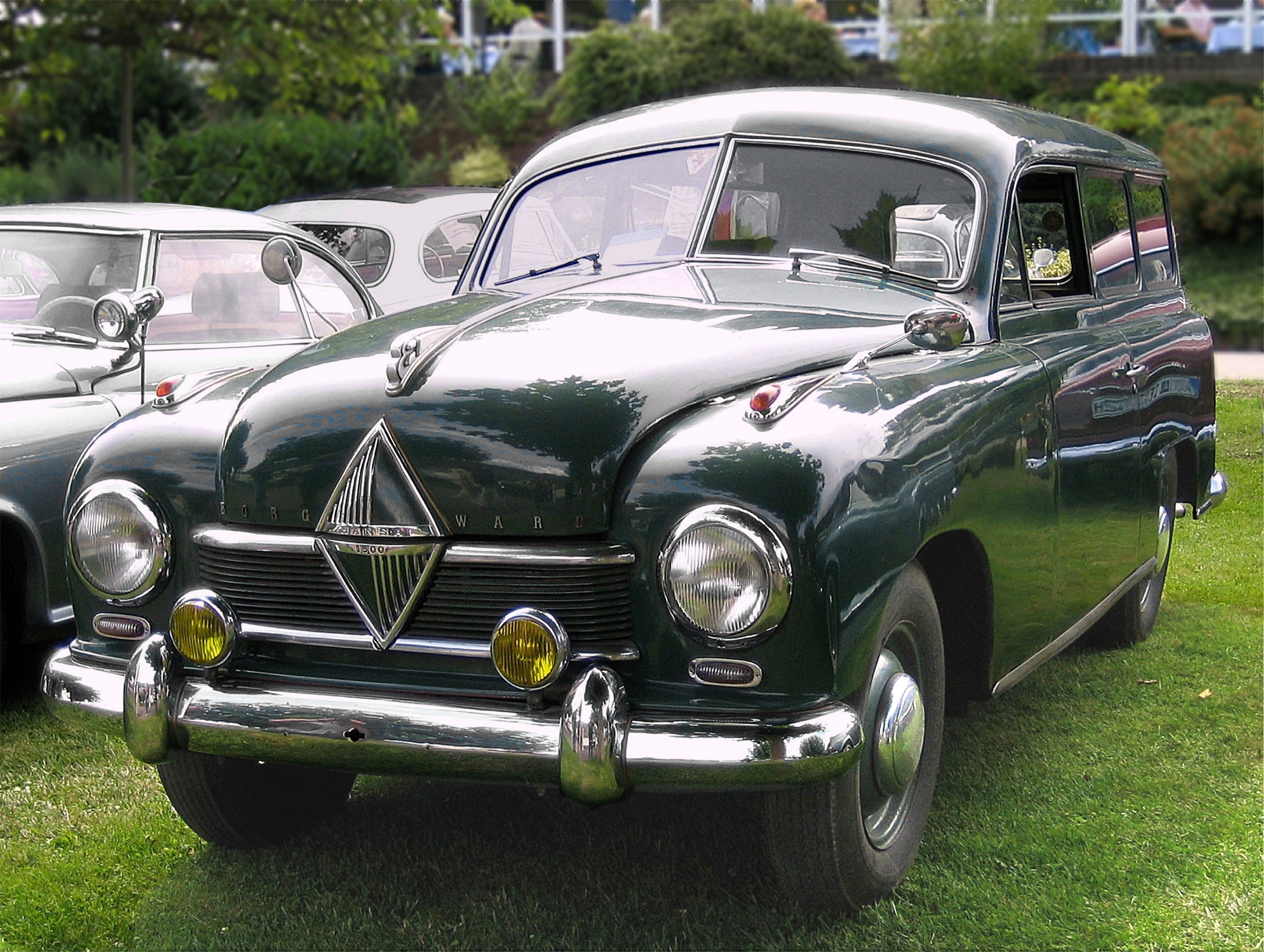
Borgward Hansa 1500 station wagon

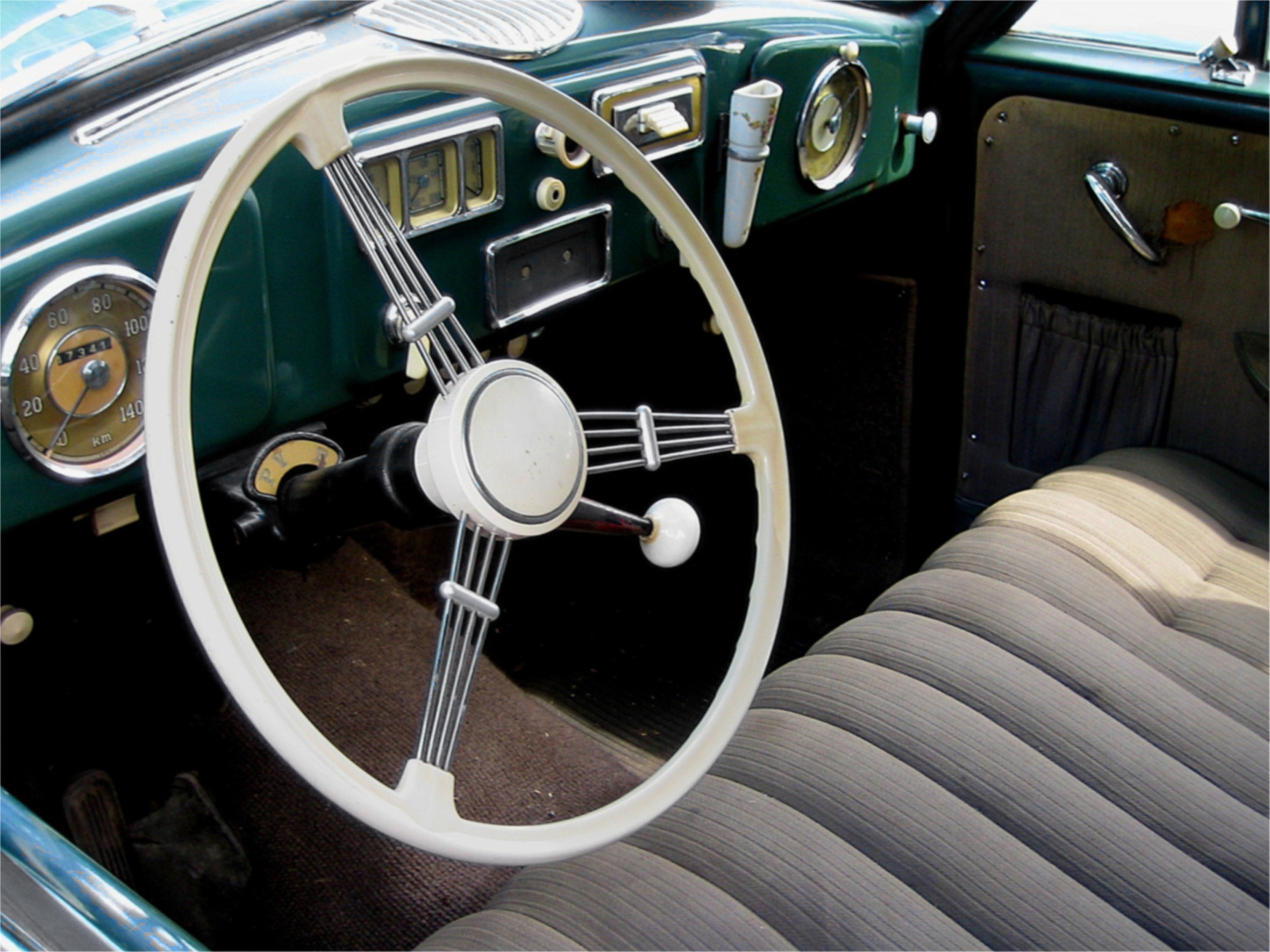
The view through the steering wheel was remarkably unencumbered. Also visible here are the column-mounted gear shift and the front bench seat which made the Hansa, unusually in Europe, a genuine six-seater.

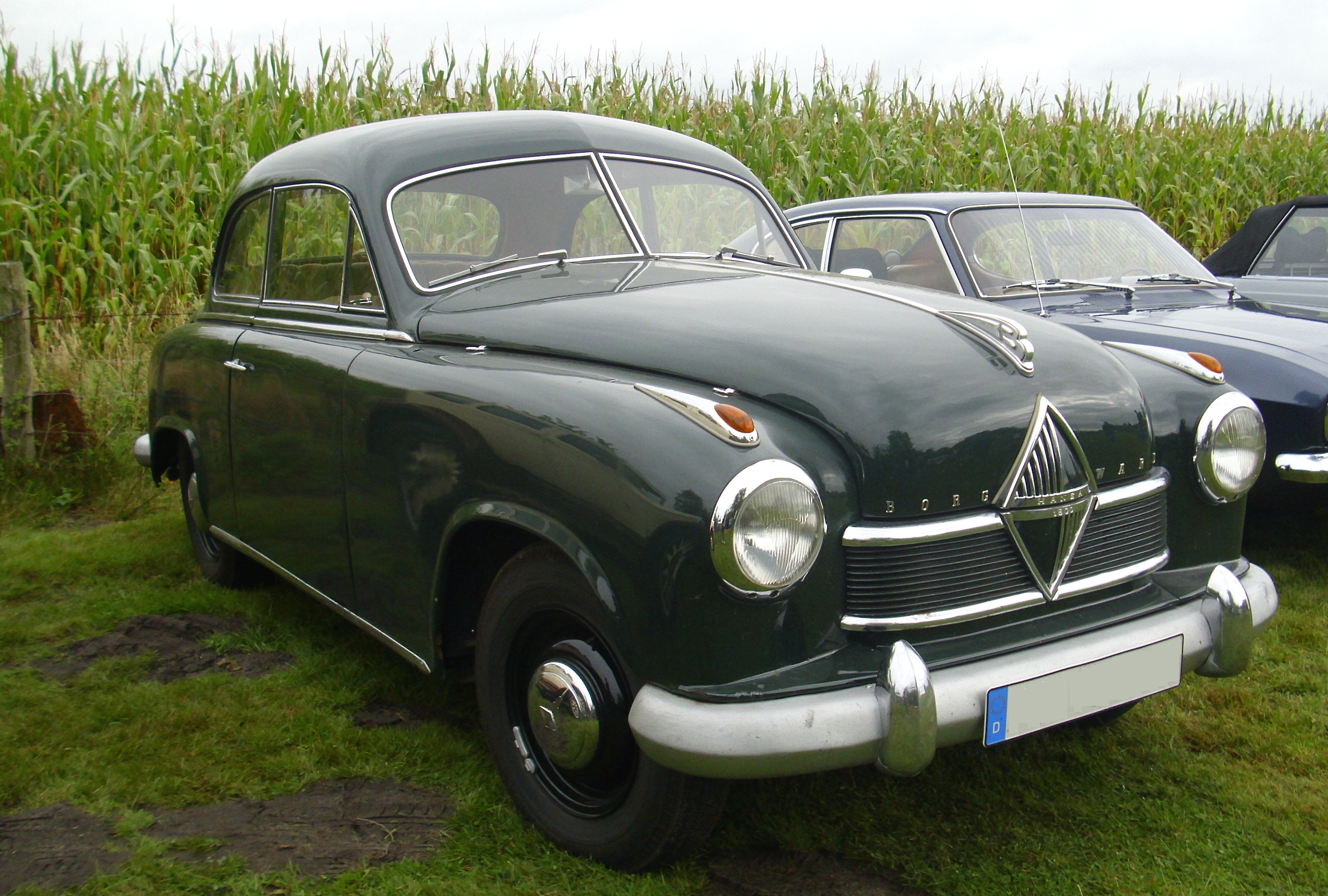
Borgward Hansa 1800 saloon
