= 6 Hours of Nürburgring =

Former endurance sports car event

FIA World Endurance Championship
- Venue: Nürburgring
- First race: 1953
- First FIA WEC race: 2015
- Duration: 6 Hours
- Previous names: ADAC 1000 km Nürburgring iRacing.com 1000 km Nürburgring
- Most wins (driver): Stirling Moss (4)
- Most wins (team): SpA Ferrari (7)
- Most wins (manufacturer): Porsche (13)

Nürburgring Nordschleife, used from 1953 to 1982, and in 1983 in shorter form

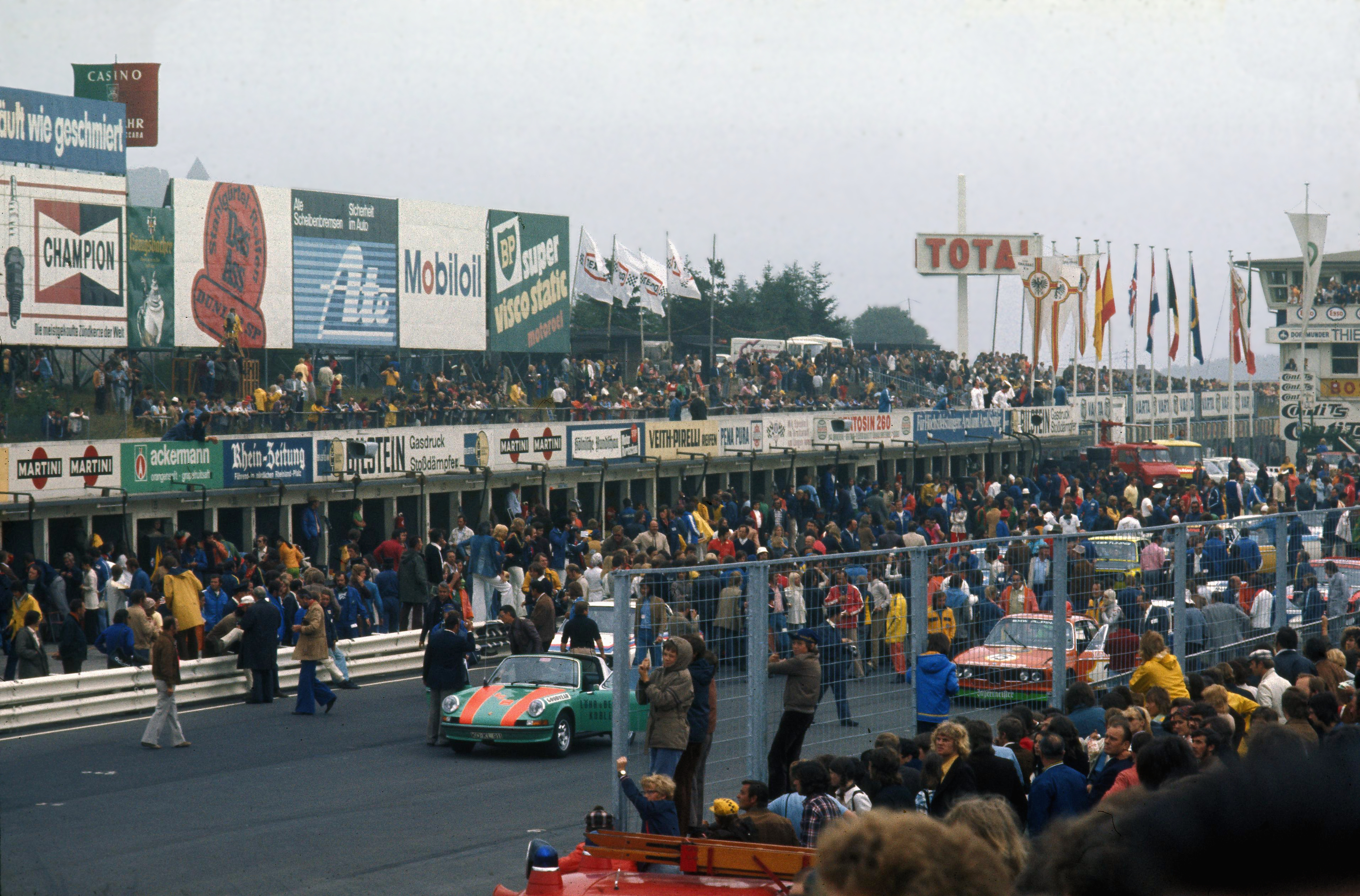
The crowd at the start of the 1973 event

The 6 Hours of Nürburgring, ran from 1953 to 2014 as the Nürburgring 1000 km, was an endurance race for sports cars held on the Nürburgring in Germany. It was organized by the ADAC, while the German Grand Prix is hosted by the AvD.

== History ==
On the traditional 22.810 km long Nordschleife ("Northern Loop") version, the competition took usually 44 laps (1003.64 km, since the addition of the Hohenrain chicane in 1967 1004.74 km) and lasted initially about 8 hours, since 1965 under 7 hours, since 1971 less than 6 hours. While the 1974 event was shortened by 25% in the wake of the oil crisis, 1976 saw a new situation with a divided World Sportscar Championship calendar: the Group 6 sportscars opened their 1976 World Sportscar Championship with a 4 April 1976 race for only 300 km without driver change. The new Group 5 "Special Production Cars" 1976 World Championship for Makes season would visit on 30 May, colliding with the 1976 Monaco Grand Prix, thus Porsche factory drivers Jacky Ickx and Jochen Mass as well as Hans-Joachim Stuck and others were absent from the Int. XXII ADAC-1000-km-Rennen Nürburgring race that was extended by 3 laps to 47, covered 1073.245 km and lasted 6:38 hours. In turn, the "Internationales 6-Stunden-Rennen" in July lasted only 4 hours as part of the European Touring Car Championship.

The inaugural race, which counted towards the 1953 World Sportscar Championship, was won by Alberto Ascari and Giuseppe Farina in a Ferrari 375 MM. The attendance was disappointing, blamed in part on the lack of a serious German entrant with more than only 1500cc. While a Borgward 1500 RS finished third, the new Porsche 550 was absent, as was Mercedes. The successful 300 SL raced only in 1952 as in 1953 Mercedes prepared for the 1954 F1 season which it entered late, in July. Once it became clear that the sportscar derived from the F1 car, the Mercedes-Benz 300 SLR, would not be ready in time for any 1954 World Sportscar Championship event, the 1000km race was cancelled. The 1955 event suffered a similar fate, reduced to 500km for 1500cc in the aftermath of the 1955 Le Mans disaster. It became quite popular in the 1960s and 1970s though, and even more so after Formula One decided not to race at the Nürburgring after the 1976 German GP on safety grounds, having already boycotted in 1970.

The last race on the already shortened Northern Loop in 1983 was won by Jochen Mass and Jacky Ickx in their Rothmans Porsche 956. In that year, due to the ongoing construction work, the track had been shorted to 20.832 km and provisional pits were used. This event saw the fastest ever timed competition lap of the Nordschleife when German driver Stefan Bellof lapped his 956 in 6:11.13 during practice, at an average of over 200 km/h. Bellof also set the race lap record during that race lapping in 6:25.91 in traffic with slower cars, one of them driven by the defending F1 champion.

Since 1984, the 1000 km races were run on the new, much shorter Grand-Prix-Strecke, while the 24 Hours Nürburgring stayed on the legendary long track. In 1991, the 1000 km races were first shortened to 480 km, then discontinued overall due to the demise of the World Sportscar Championship.

In 2000, the 1000 km were resumed, with new competitive cars of BMW and Audi. The race was held as a part of the European Le Mans Series (ELMS), the European version of the American Le Mans Series (ALMS). In a wet race, the unusual front-engined Panoz of Jan Magnussen and David Brabham won, ahead of a BMW V12 LMR, an Audi R8 and the second Panoz.

On September 4, 2005, the 1000 km was held as a part of the Le Mans Endurance Series (LMES).

The 500 km Nürburgring was also similar event for smaller sportscars during the 1960s and 1970s. Current and eternal record of most 1000 km wins belongs to Stirling Moss who won the race in 1956, 1958, 1959, and 1960.

VLN/NLS also runs a 6-hour endurance race, while racing only 4h in other heats. In 2010, for the first time a distance of more than 1000 km was covered by the winning Porsche 911 GT3. In 2010, the winning Porsche 911 GT3 R of the 6h ADAC Ruhr-Pokal-Rennen race was the first to cover more than 1000 km in a 6-hour VLN endurance race for GT3 and touring cars, lapping the 24.369 km long modern version of the Nordschleife 42 times for 1023.498 km in a time of 6:06:56.091. The 2012 winner, a Mercedes-Benz SLS AMG GT3, covered the same distance in a time of only 6:01:29.541, at an average of 169.879 km/h.

As a part of the Oldtimer Festival in 2010 the tradition and name of the renowned ADAC 1000 km of Nürburgring will be continued by the motor sport club DAMC 05. In contrast to former years, the race is organised for older cars and therefore the term “classic” was added to the name.

The 2013 race was the first under the Blancpain Endurance Series banner of the Stephane Ratel Organisation.

== Winners ==
Year	Drivers	Team	Car	Time	Championship
1000 km distance, 22.835 km circuit
1953	(Italy) Alberto Ascari (Italy) Giuseppe Farina	(Italy) Automobili Ferrari	Ferrari 375 MM Spyder	8:20:44.000	World Sportscar Championship
1954 to 1955	No Races				
1956	(Italy) Piero Taruffi (United States) Harry Schell (France) Jean Behra (United Kingdom) Stirling Moss	(Italy) Officine Alfieri Maserati	Maserati 300S	7:43:54.400	World Sportscar Championship; German Sportscar Championship
1957	(United Kingdom) Tony Brooks (United Kingdom) Noël Cunningham-Reid	(United Kingdom) David Brown	Aston Martin DBR1/300	7:33:38.200	World Sportscar Championship
1958	(United Kingdom) Stirling Moss (Australia) Jack Brabham	(United Kingdom) David Brown	Aston Martin DBR1/300	7:23:33.000	World Sportscar Championship
1959	(United Kingdom) Stirling Moss (United Kingdom) Jack Fairman	(United Kingdom) David Brown	Aston Martin DBR1/300	7:33:18.000	World Sportscar Championship
1960	(United Kingdom) Stirling Moss (United States) Dan Gurney	(United States) Camoradi USA	Maserati Tipo 61	7:31:40.500	World Sportscar Championship
1961	(United States) Lloyd Casner (United States) Masten Gregory	(United States) Camoradi USA	Maserati Tipo 61	7:51:39.200	World Sportscar Championship
1962	(United States) Phil Hill (Belgium) Olivier Gendebien	(Italy) SpA Ferrari SEFAC	Ferrari 246 SP	7:33:27.700	International Championship for GT Manufacturers
1963	(United Kingdom) John Surtees (Belgium) Willy Mairesse	(Italy) SpA Ferrari SEFAC	Ferrari 250 P	7:32:18.000	International Championship for GT Manufacturers
1964	(Italy) Ludovico Scarfiotti (Italy) Nino Vaccarella	(Italy) SpA Ferrari SEFAC	Ferrari 275 P	7:08:27.000	International Championship for GT Manufacturers
1965	(United Kingdom) John Surtees (Italy) Ludovico Scarfiotti	(Italy) SpA Ferrari SEFAC	Ferrari 330 P2	6:53:05.400	International Championship for GT Manufacturers
1966	(United States) Phil Hill (Sweden) Jo Bonnier	(United States) Chaparral Cars Inc.	Chaparral 2D-Chevrolet	6:58:47.600	International Championship for Sports-Prototypes; International Championship for Sports Cars
1967	(United States) Joe Buzzetta (West Germany) Udo Schütz	(West Germany) Porsche System Engineering	Porsche 910	6:54:12.900	International Championship for Sports-Prototypes; International Championship for Sports Cars
1968	(United Kingdom) Vic Elford (Switzerland) Jo Siffert	(West Germany) Porsche System Engineering	Porsche 908	6:34:06.300	International Championship for Makes
1969	(Switzerland) Jo Siffert (United Kingdom) Brian Redman	(West Germany) Porsche System Engineering	Porsche 908/02	6:11:02.300	International Championship for Makes
1970	(United Kingdom) Vic Elford (West Germany) Kurt Ahrens Jr.	(Austria) Porsche Salzburg	Porsche 908#908/03 (1970)Porsche 908/03	6:05:21.200	International Championship for Makes
1971	(United Kingdom) Vic Elford (France) Gérard Larrousse	(West Germany) Martini Racing	Porsche 908#908/03 (1970)Porsche 908/03	5:51:49.300	International Championship for Makes
1972	(Sweden) Ronnie Peterson (Australia) Tim Schenken	(Italy) SpA Ferrari SEFAC	Ferrari 312 PB	6:01:40.200	World Championship for Makes; Deutsche Rennsport Meisterschaft
1973	(Belgium) Jacky Ickx (United Kingdom) Brian Redman	(Italy) SpA Ferrari SEFAC	Ferrari 312 PB	5:36:53.400	World Championship for Makes; Deutsche Rennsport Meisterschaft
1974	(France) Jean-Pierre Jarier (France) Jean-Pierre Beltoise	(France) Equipe Gitanes	Matra-Simca MS670C	4:07:24.100 (Note: 1974 Race scheduled for 750 km only.); 33 laps, 753 km	World Championship for Makes; Deutsche Rennsport Meisterschaft
1975	(Italy) Arturo Merzario (France) Jacques Laffite	(West Germany) Willi Kauhsen Racing Team	Alfa Romeo 33TT12	5:41:14.100	World Championship for Makes; Deutsche Rennsport Meisterschaft
1976	(West Germany) Albrecht Krebs (Austria) Dieter Quester	(West Germany) Schnitzer Motorsport	BMW 3.5 CSL	6:38:20.600	World Championship for Makes
1977	(West Germany) Rolf Stommelen (Australia) Tim Schenken (Netherlands) Toine Hezemans	(West Germany) Gelo Racing	Porsche 935	5:58:30.500	World Championship for Makes
1978	(West Germany) Klaus Ludwig (West Germany) Hans Heyer (Netherlands) Toine Hezemans	(West Germany) Gelo Racing	Porsche 935/77	5:55:46.600	World Championship for Makes
1979	(Liechtenstein) Manfred Schurti (France) Bob Wollek (United Kingdom) John Fitzpatrick	(West Germany) Gelo Racing	Porsche 935/77	5:57:35.100	World Championship for Makes
1980	(West Germany) Rolf Stommelen (West Germany) Jürgen Barth	(West Germany) Joest Racing	Porsche 908/4 Turbo	5:52:15.100	World Championship for Makes
1981	(West Germany) Hans-Joachim Stuck (Brazil) Nelson Piquet	(West Germany) GS Tuning	BMW M1 Gr.5	2:16:50.860 (Note: 1981 Race stopped after 17 laps due to fatal accident of Herbert Müller which caused track damage.); 17 laps, 388 km	World Endurance Championship
1982	(Italy) Michele Alboreto (Italy) Teo Fabi (Italy) Riccardo Patrese	(Italy) Martini Racing	Lancia LC1 Spyder	5:54:10.830	World Endurance Championship
1000 km distance, 20.830 km circuit
1983	(West Germany) Jochen Mass (Belgium) Jacky Ickx	(West Germany) Porsche Racing International	Porsche 956	5:26:34.630	World Endurance Championship
1000 km distance, 4.551 km circuit
1984	(West Germany) Stefan Bellof (United Kingdom) Derek Bell	(West Germany) Rothmans Porsche	Porsche 956	6:00:43.590	World Endurance Championship; Deutsche Rennsport Meisterschaft
1985	No Race				
1986	(France) Henri Pescarolo (New Zealand) Mike Thackwell	(Switzerland) Kouros Racing Team	Sauber C8-Mercedes	3:42:30.020 (Note: 1986 Race was stopped due to torrential rain and only ran approximately 600 km.); 121 laps, 599 km	World Sports Prototype Championship
1987	(United States) Eddie Cheever (Brazil) Raul Boesel	(United Kingdom) Silk Cut Jaguar	Jaguar XJR-8	5:55:53.120	World Sports Prototype Championship
1988	(France) Jean-Louis Schlesser (West Germany) Jochen Mass	(Switzerland) Team Sauber Mercedes	Sauber C9-Mercedes	5:53:00.600	World Sports Prototype Championship
480 km distance, 4.551 km circuit
1989	(France) Jean-Louis Schlesser (West Germany) Jochen Mass	(West Germany) Team Sauber Mercedes	Sauber C9-Mercedes	2:47:14.599	World Sports Prototype Championship
1990	(France) Jean-Louis Schlesser (Italy) Mauro Baldi	(West Germany) Team Sauber Mercedes	Mercedes-Benz C11	2:39:15.913	World Sports Prototype Championship
430 km distance, 4.551 km circuit
1991	(United Kingdom) Derek Warwick (Australia) David Brabham	(United Kingdom) Silk Cut Jaguar	Jaguar XJR-14	2:23:41.028	World Sportscar Championship
1992 to 1999	No Races				
1000 km distance, 4.556 km circuit
2000	(Denmark) Jan Magnussen (Australia) David Brabham	(United States) Panoz Motor Sports	Ford Panoz LMP1-Élan	5:45:55.173	American Le Mans Series
2001 to 2003	No Races				
1000 km distance, 5.148 km circuit
2004	(United Kingdom) Allan McNish (Germany) Pierre Kaffer	(United Kingdom) Audi Sport UK Veloqx	Audi R8	6:00:32.64 (Note: Time limit of 6 hours reached before 1,000 km distance was completed.); 180 laps, 925 km	Le Mans Series
2005	(United Kingdom) Tom Chilton (Japan) Hayanari Shimoda	(United Kingdom) Zytek Motorsport	Zytek 04S	6:01:06.739; 193 laps, 991 km	Le Mans Series
2006	(France) Jean-Christophe Boullion (France) Emmanuel Collard (France) Éric Hélary	(France) Pescarolo Sport	Pescarolo C60-Judd	6:01:26.300; 189 laps, 971 km	Le Mans Series
2007	(France) Stéphane Sarrazin (Portugal) Pedro Lamy	(France) Team Peugeot Total	Peugeot 908 HDi FAP (Diesel)	6:01:13.628	Le Mans Series
2008	(France) Stéphane Sarrazin (Portugal) Pedro Lamy	(France) Team Peugeot Total	Peugeot 908 HDi FAP (Diesel)	5:44:48.174	Le Mans Series
2009	(Czech Republic) Jan Charouz (Czech Republic) Tomáš Enge (Germany) Stefan Mücke	(United Kingdom) Aston Martin Racing	Lola-Aston Martin B09/60	5:57:26.595	Le Mans Series
1000 km distance, 25.378 km circuit
2010	(Germany) Wolfgang Pohl (Germany) Daniel Schrey		Porsche Carrera RS	7:00:42.2 48 (Note: Time limit of 7 hours reached before 1,000 km distance was completed.); 35 laps, 888 km	FHR Langstreckencup
2011 to 2012	No Races				
1000 km distance, 5.137 km circuit
2013	(Germany) Maximilian Buhk (Germany) Maximilian Götz (Germany) Bernd Schneider	(Germany) HTP Motorsport	Mercedes-Benz SLS AMG GT3	6:00:46.354; 178 laps, 916 km	Blancpain Endurance Series
2014	(Belgium) Laurens Vanthoor (Brazil) César Ramos (Germany) Christopher Mies	(Belgium) Belgian Audi Club Team WRT	Audi R8 LMS ultra	6:00:07.848; 158 laps, 813 km	Blancpain Endurance Series
6 hours time, 5.148 km circuit
2015	(Germany) Timo Bernhard (New Zealand) Brendon Hartley (Australia) Mark Webber	(Germany) Porsche Team	Porsche 919 Hybrid	6:01:16.966, 203 laps, 1045 km	FIA World Endurance Championship
2016	(Germany) Timo Bernhard (New Zealand) Brendon Hartley (Australia) Mark Webber	(Germany) Porsche Team	Porsche 919 Hybrid	6:01:16.183, 194 laps, 999 km	FIA World Endurance Championship
2017	(Germany) Timo Bernhard (New Zealand) Brendon Hartley (New Zealand) Earl Bamber	(Germany) Porsche LMP Team	Porsche 919 Hybrid	6:00:09.607, 204 laps, 1050 km	FIA World Endurance Championship
2018 to 2019	No Races				
2020	(Italy) Matteo Cairoli (Germany) Christian Engelhart (Germany) Sven Müller	(Italy) Dinamic Motorsport	Porsche 911 (991 II) GT3 R	6:01:08.058, 173 laps, 882 km	GT World Challenge Europe Endurance Cup

=== 3 Hours of Nürburgring ===
Year	Drivers	Team	Car	Time	Championship
5.137 km circuit
2012	(Belgium) Marc Goossens (Germany) Marc Hennerici (Netherlands) Xavier Maassen	(Belgium) Prospeed Competition	Porsche 997 GT3-R	3:01:00.965, 86 laps, 443 km	Blancpain Endurance Series
2013 to 2014	No Races				
2015	(United Kingdom) Rob Bell (France) Kévin Estre (New Zealand) Shane van Gisbergen	(New Zealand) Von Ryan Racing	McLaren 650S GT3	3:00:18.820, 88 laps, 452 km	Blancpain Endurance Series
2016	(Italy) Mirko Bortolotti (Germany) Christian Engelhart (Switzerland) Rolf Ineichen	(Austria) GRT Grasser Racing Team	Lamborghini Huracán GT3	3:00:08.036, 85 laps, 437 km	Blancpain Endurance Series
2017 to 2020	No Races				
5.148 km circuit
2021	(Italy) Mirko Bortolotti (Italy) Andrea Caldarelli (Italy) Marco Mapelli	(China) Orange 1 FFF Racing Team	Lamborghini Huracán GT3 Evo	3:00:53.243, 87 laps, 448 km	GT World Challenge Europe Endurance Cup
2022	No Race				
5.137 km circuit
2023	(Switzerland) Raffaele Marciello; Timur Boguslavskiy (Andorra) Jules Gounon	(France) AKKodis ASP Team	Mercedes-AMG GT3 Evo	3:01:33.469, 92 laps, 473 km	GT World Challenge Europe Endurance Cup
2024	(Italy) Marco Mapelli (South Africa) Jordan Pepper (France) Franck Perera	(Austria) Grasser Racing Team	Lamborghini Huracán GT3 Evo 2	3:00:09.068, 90 laps, 462 km	GT World Challenge Europe Endurance Cup
2025	(Brazil) Augusto Farfus (Finland) Jesse Krohn (Switzerland) Raffaele Marciello	(Germany) ROWE Racing	BMW M4 GT3 Evo	3:01:14.583, 86 laps, 442 km	GT World Challenge Europe Endurance Cup

== Gallery ==
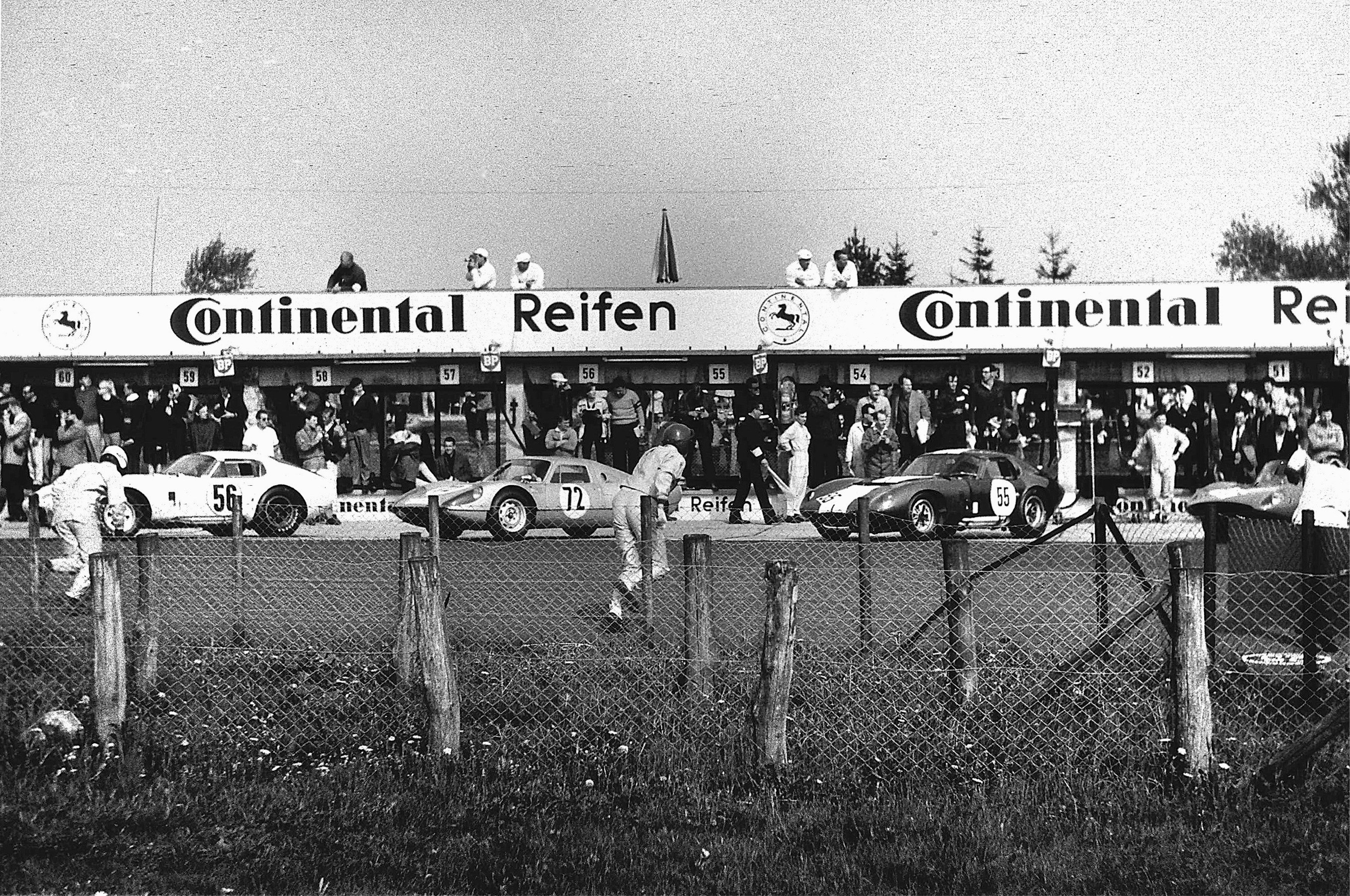
Le Mans start in 1965

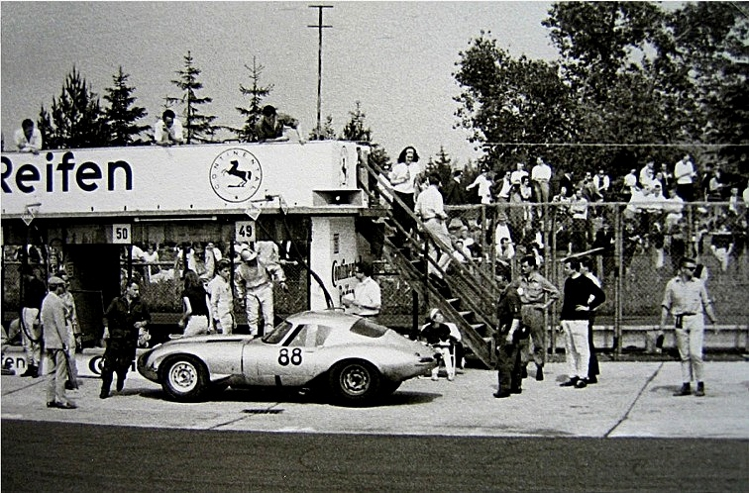
Pit stop during the 1964 race

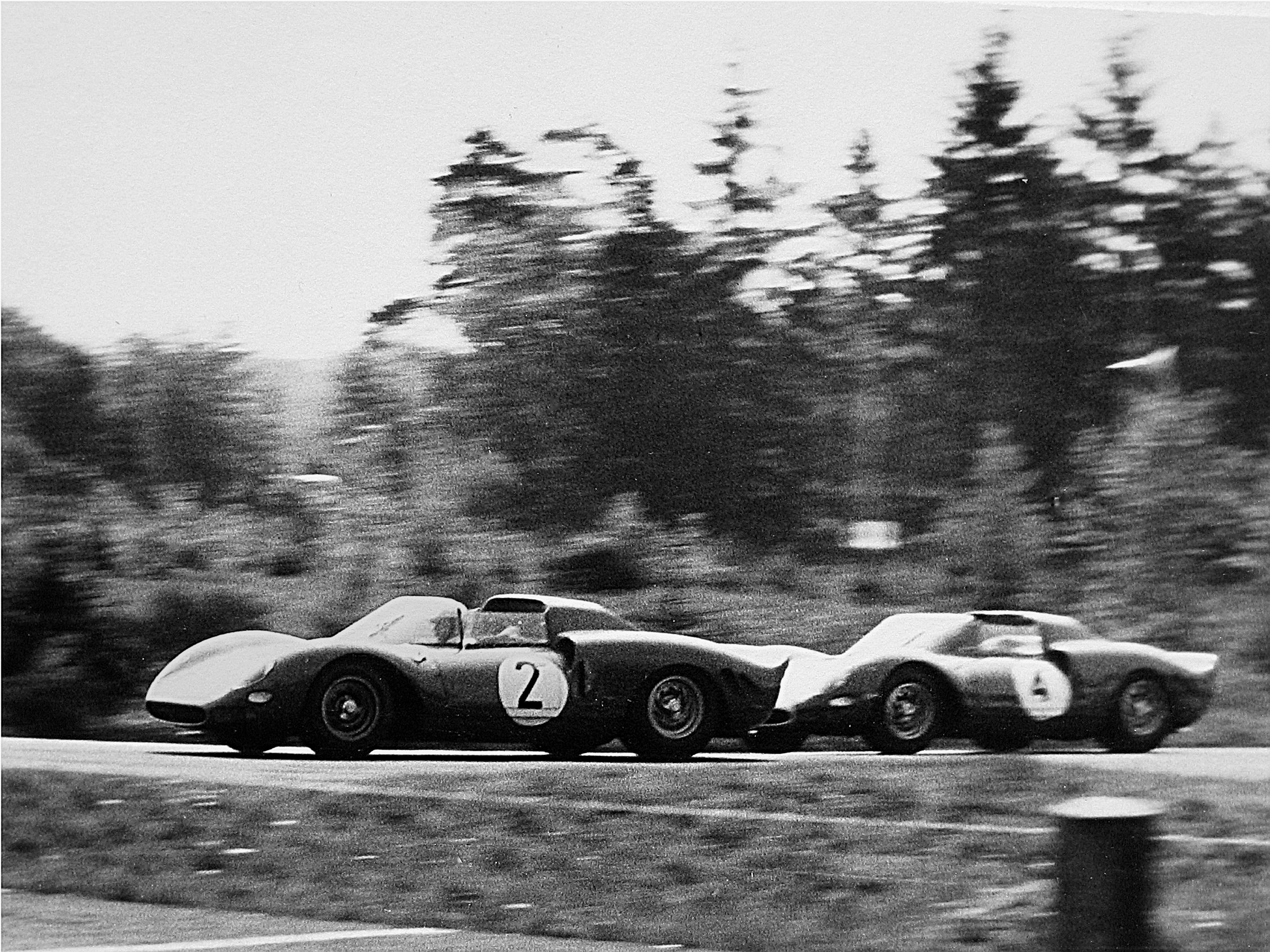
1965: Mike Parkes in front of Graham Hill

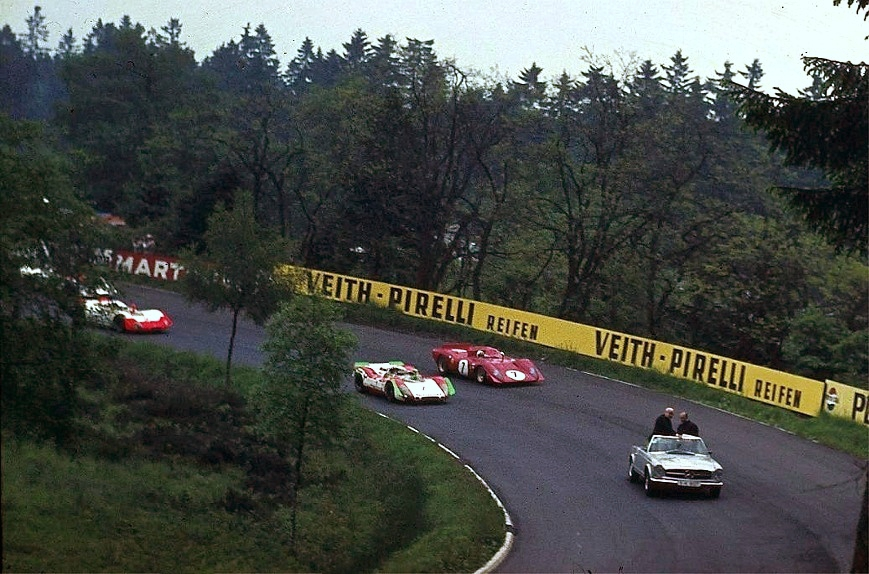
Rolling start in 1969

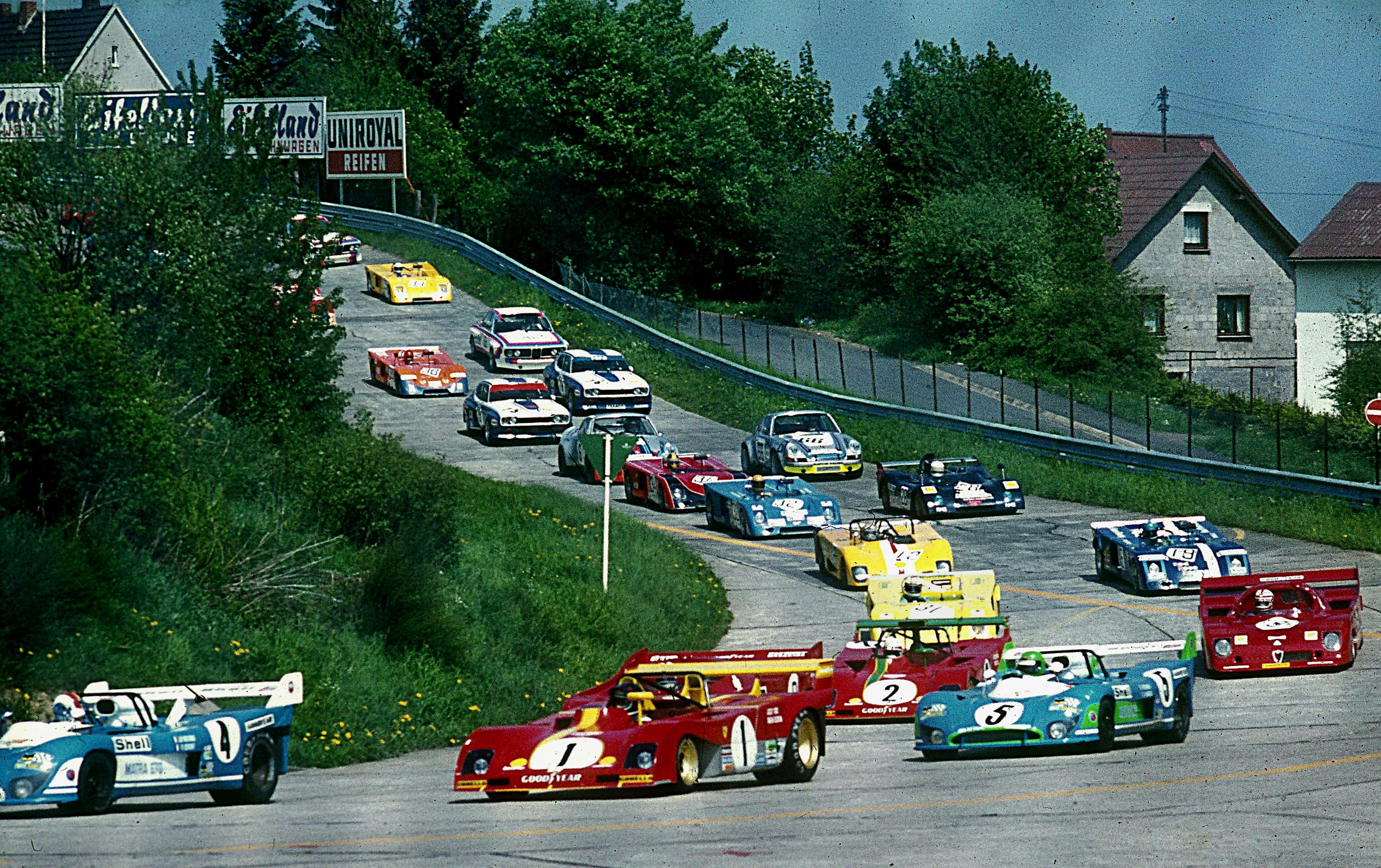
Starting 1973

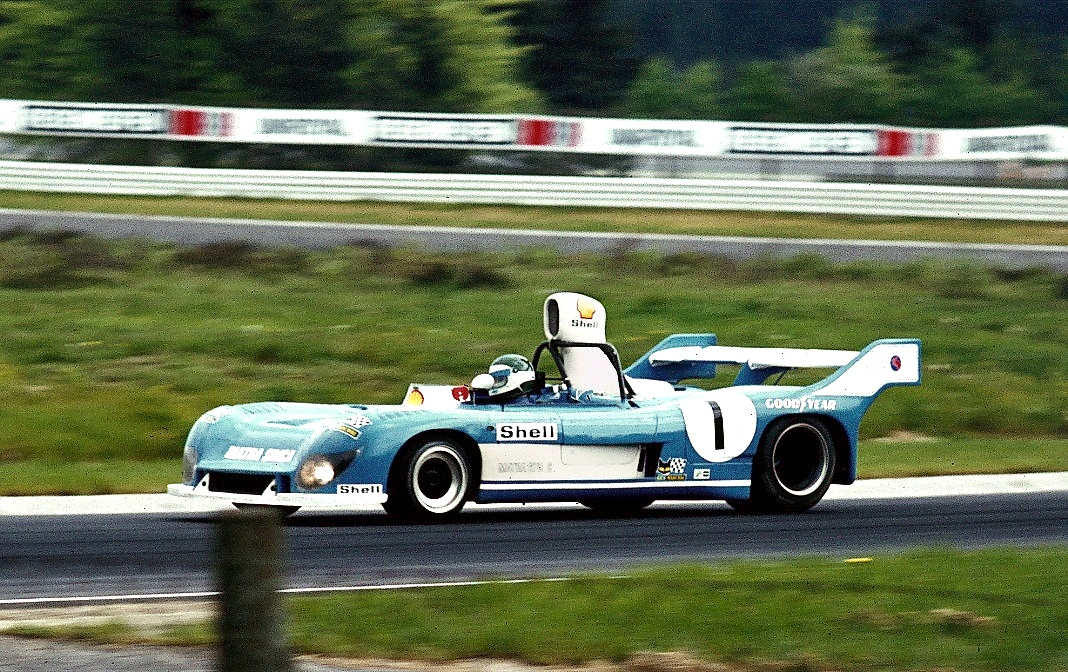
Jean-Pierre Jarier, winner 1974 on Matra Simca, together with Jean-Pierre Beltoise
