= Oldtimer Festival =

The logo of the Oldtimer Festival

The Oldtimer Festival (German pseudo-anglicism: vintage car festival) is a motor-sport event held by the DAMC 05 since 1983 on the Nürburgring, Germany. The official name of the event is Internationales Oldtimer Festival um den "Jan-Wellem-Pokal" auf dem Nürburgring, known colloquially as the "Jan Wellem".

== Character of the meeting ==
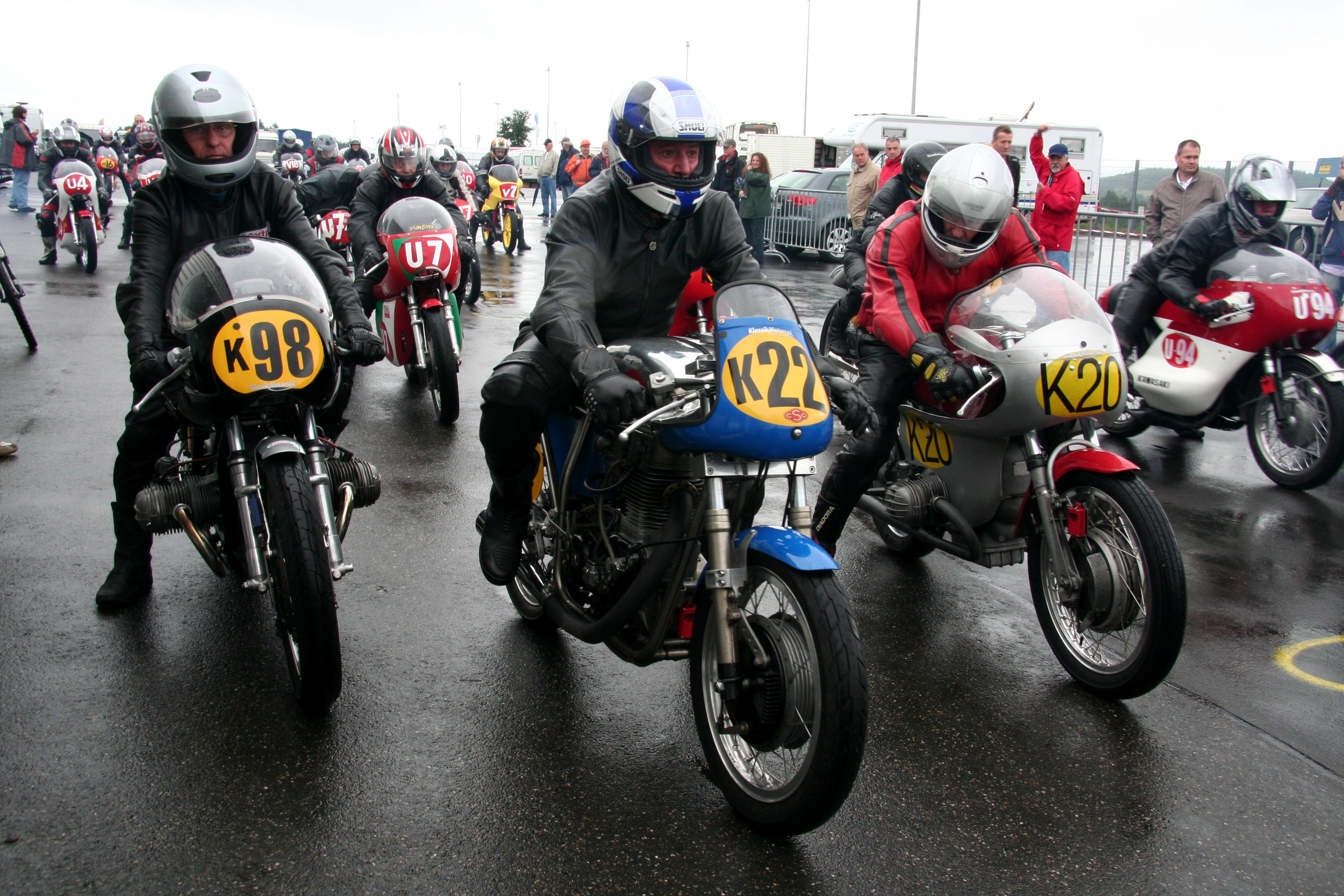
2007 Oldtimer Festival at the prestart in the new paddock of the Nürburgring

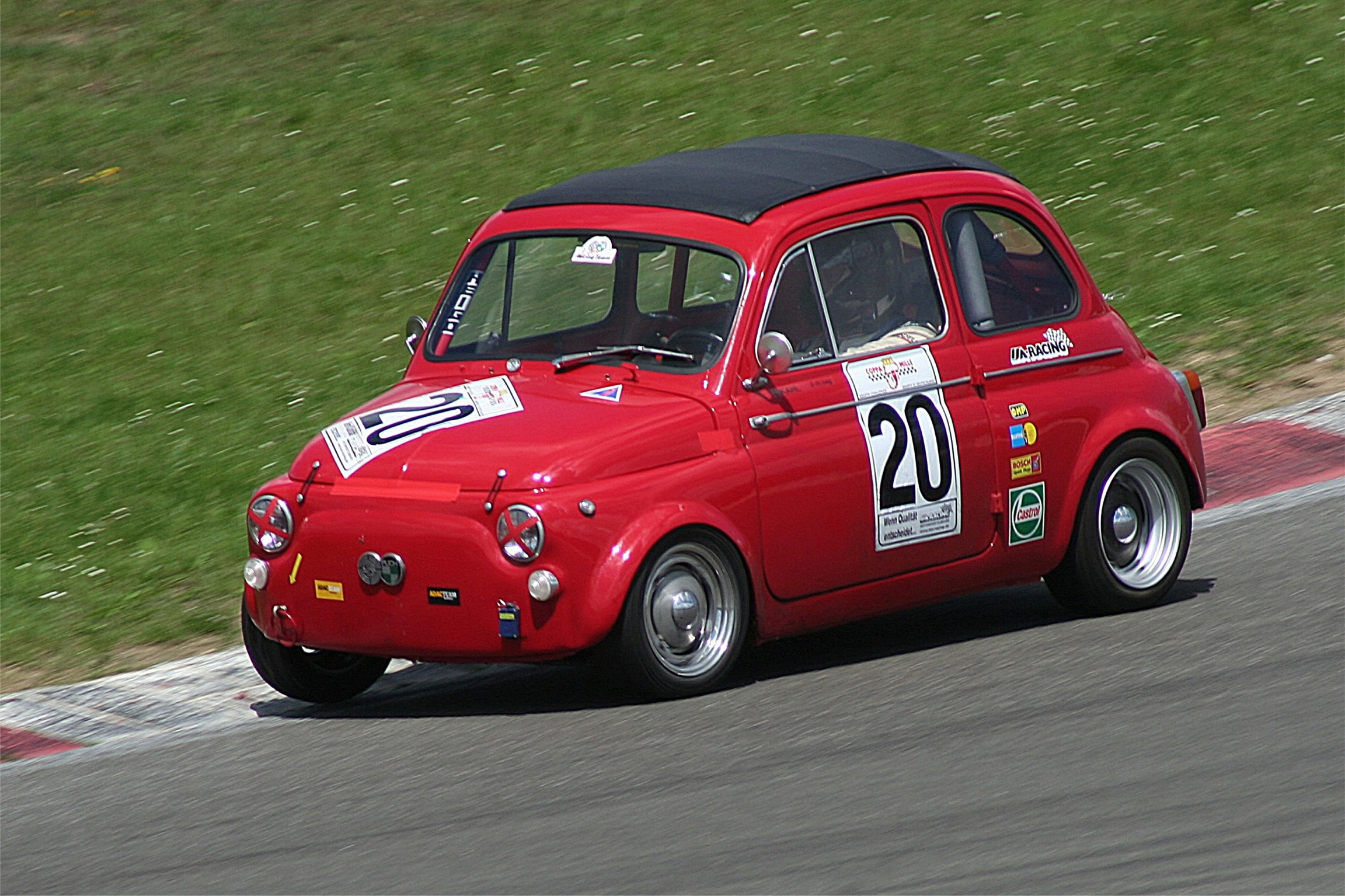
2008 Steyr-Puch 650TR at the race known as the "Battle Of the Dwarfs"

The Oldtimer Festival is a three-day race meeting for historic automobiles, motorbikes and sidecars. The event is mainly for classic vehicles of the post war era up to cars and bikes of the 1970s. Many of the vehicles racing there are well known by the spectators from the times of their youth. The public is allowed free access to the paddock, which enables direct contact with the competitors. To enable the presenting of the respective vehicles in the correct setting, the paddock is divided in sections according to the race series and clubs taking part.

The automobiles compete mainly under the regulations of the international FIA sporting code which means real racing. The motorbikes and sidecars however run in regularity trials according to the national rules of the German Motor Sports Association, the DMSB. Regularity trials are not about the fastest race times and therefore help preserve the historic material.

=== Last combined event for cars and motorbikes in Germany ===
Up to the 1970s combined meetings with cars and motorbikes were common in Germany. As a result of the increasing discussions about safety and tightening of safety regulations it became more and more difficult and expensive for organisers to arrange combined events. The Oldtimer Festival is the last big event of its kind with permission of the DMSB.

== History ==
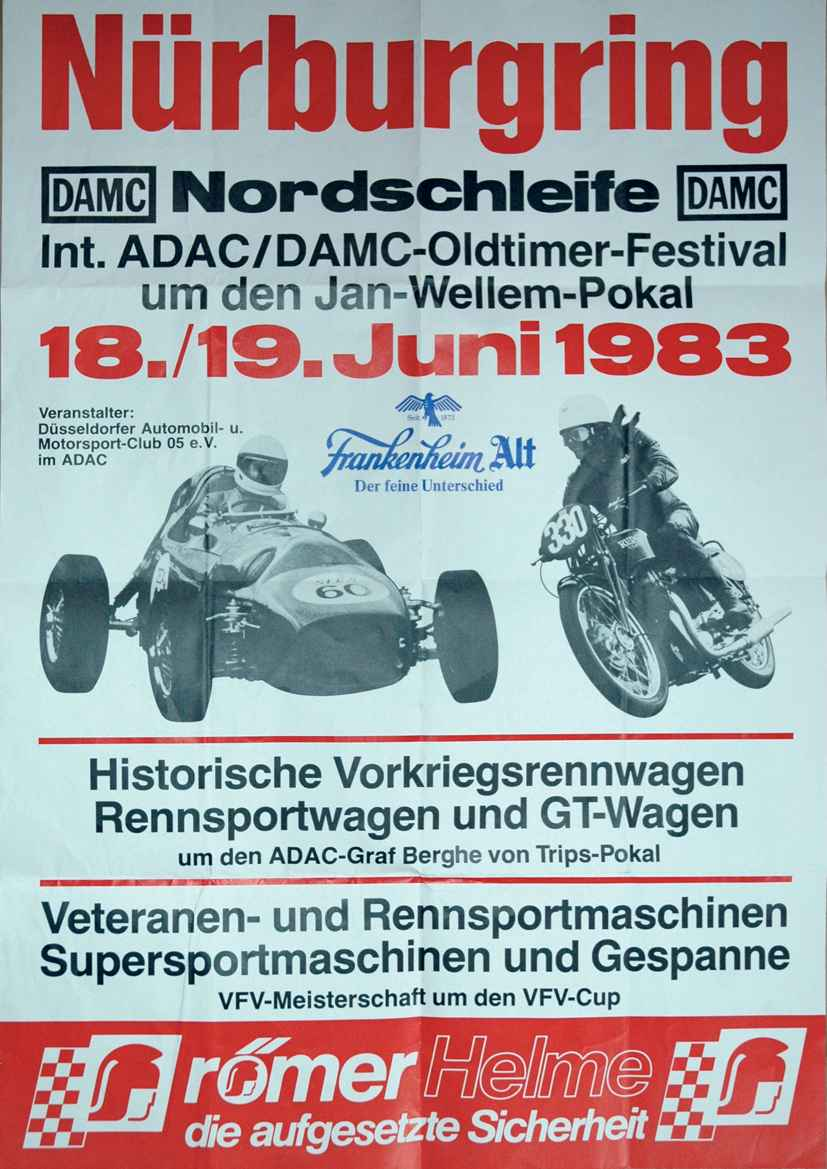
Poster of the 1st Oldtimer Festival 1983

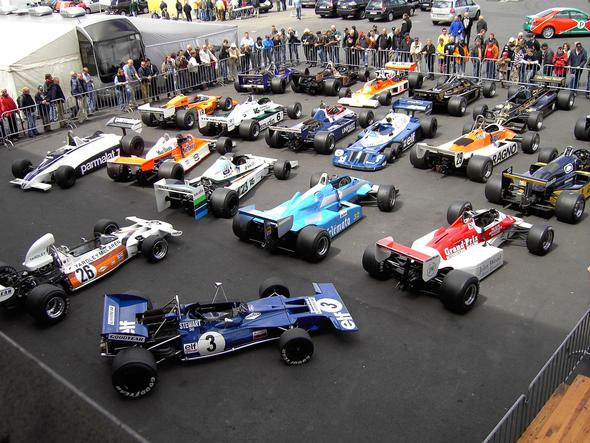
1995 Historic Formula One Championship in the parc fermé

Until 1982 the DAMC 05 organised on the Nürburgring a circuit race called "Rundstreckenrennen um den Jan-Wellem-Pokal". This race was held for modern and historical cars. In 1983 during the reconstruction of the Grand-Prix-Circuit, the Oldtimer Festival was held on the Nordschleife of the Nürburgring solely for historic car, bikes and sidecars.

In 1984 the "Oldtimer Festival" was part of the opening meetings for the new Grand-Prix-Circuit of the Nürburgring. The event was extended to a three day event.

In 1990 the DAMC 05 together with the ADMV organised during the Oldtimer Festival the one and only heat of the German Democratic Republic's championships for formula easter cars and for Trabants in the FRG.

In 1995 for the first time the Historic Formula One Championship visited the Oldtimer Festival.

In 2008 the Oldtimer Festival took place during the summer month for the last time.

In 2009 the meeting had to be cancelled because of problems with the international race calendar.

== The present ==
In 2010 the 27th Oldtimer Festival took place from 10 to 12 September 2010 on the Nürburgring. As a part of the Oldtimer Festival in 2010 the tradition and name of the renowned ADAC 1000 km of Nürburgring will be continued. In contrast to former years, the race is organised for older cars and therefore the term “classic” was added to the name.

== Jan-Wellem-Pokal ==
The Jan-Wellem-Pokal (Jan Wellem Trophy) is named after count Johann Wilhelm, Elector Palatine (1658–1716), in Düsseldorf commonly known as Jan Wellem.

The trophy is awarded to the victor achieving the biggest time gap in the car races.

As bikes and sidecars compete under the regularity trial regulations, the Jan Wellem Trophy is given to the most consistent driver.
