= Nürburgring Classic =

Racing event for classic cars at the Nürburgring

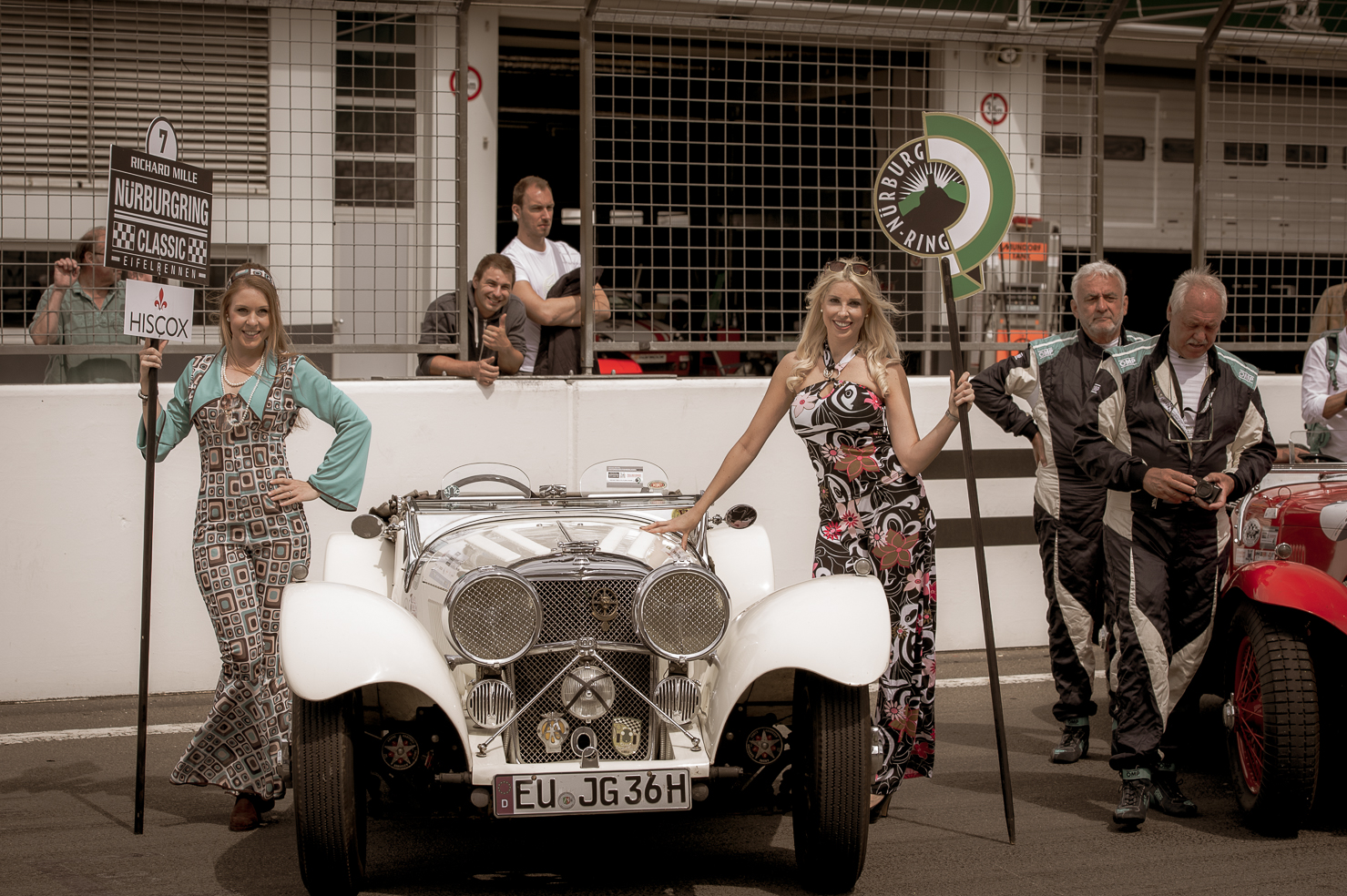
Vehicle presentation before the “Elephant Race”, Nürburgring Classic 2018.

The Nürburgring Classic is a motorsports competition for classic cars at the Nürburgring, which has been held since 2017 under the idealistic sponsorship of the Düsseldorfer Automobil- und Motorsport-Club 05.

From 2005 to 2007, the event was organized by the ADAC Regional Club North Rhine-Westphalia as the ADAC Nürburgring-Classic.

== History ==
The first ADAC Nürburgring-Classic, organized by the ADAC Regional Club of North Rhine-Westphalia, was still a two-day event and began on Saturday, October 1, 2005.

In addition to the two main races — the 300-km race on the Nordschleife for touring cars and GT cars, and the ADAC Graf Berghe von Trips Cup race for formula cars — many regularity runs were held. The supporting program included a nostalgic fair, an exhibition of one-of-a-kind automobiles, a tractor and fire truck gathering, and brand club meetings.

In 2006, the event was expanded to a three-day event and took place from September 22 to 24. The tractor and farm vehicle meet attracted over 400 participants in 2006. The sporting highlight—the endurance race for historic touring cars and GT vehicles from the 1950s and 1960s—was extended from a 300-km race to a 500-km race.

The last ADAC Nürburgring-Classic took place from September 21 to 23, 2007, once again featuring the 500-km race for historic touring cars and GT vehicles, but this time split into two heats. The Mercedes-Benz Museum once again showcased its vehicles, ranging from the pre-war SSK to the W 196, which was driven by Jochen Mass. The formula cars also got the race underway once again in the ADAC Graf Berghe von Trips Cup race, along with many regularity runs for the participating brand clubs. 22,000 spectators were at the Ring that weekend under sunny skies.

As of at least April 2008, the Nürburgring's event calendar still listed another ADAC Nürburgring-Classic scheduled for late September, but the event was ultimately replaced by the revival of the ADAC Eifelrennen.

== Current Event ==
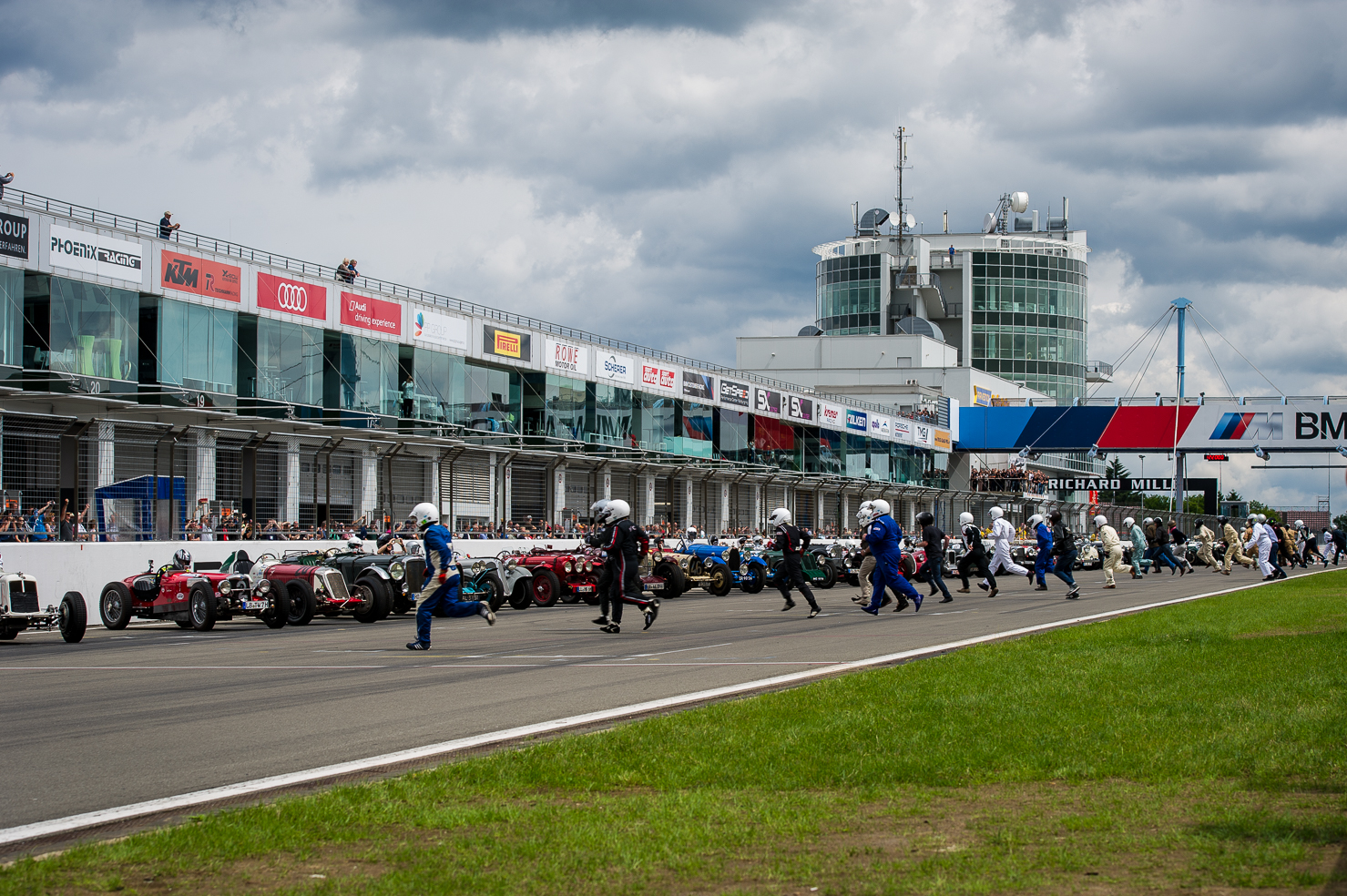
Le Mans-style start for the participants in the 2018 “Elephant Race”

In 2017, after a 9-year hiatus, the Nürburgring Classic was revived with a new event concept. To mark the 90th anniversary of the Nürburgring, the Düsseldorf Automobile and Motorsports Club 05 hosted the new classic car racing event from June 16 to 18, 2017.

The main race of the Nürburgring Classic, the three-hour endurance race, was titled the "Eifelrennen" in honor of the anniversary of the inaugural race in 1927.

Through collaboration with the organizers of Classic Days, the focus of the event has shifted from a pure racing event to one with greater audience and club-sport involvement. For example, the "Historic Paddock" was reserved for a gathering of 120 pre-war vehicles, whose participants were also allowed to compete in the Revival Run on the Südschleife and in the "Elephant Race". Additional grandstands were set up in the pre-start area, and quiet zones were created for spectators.

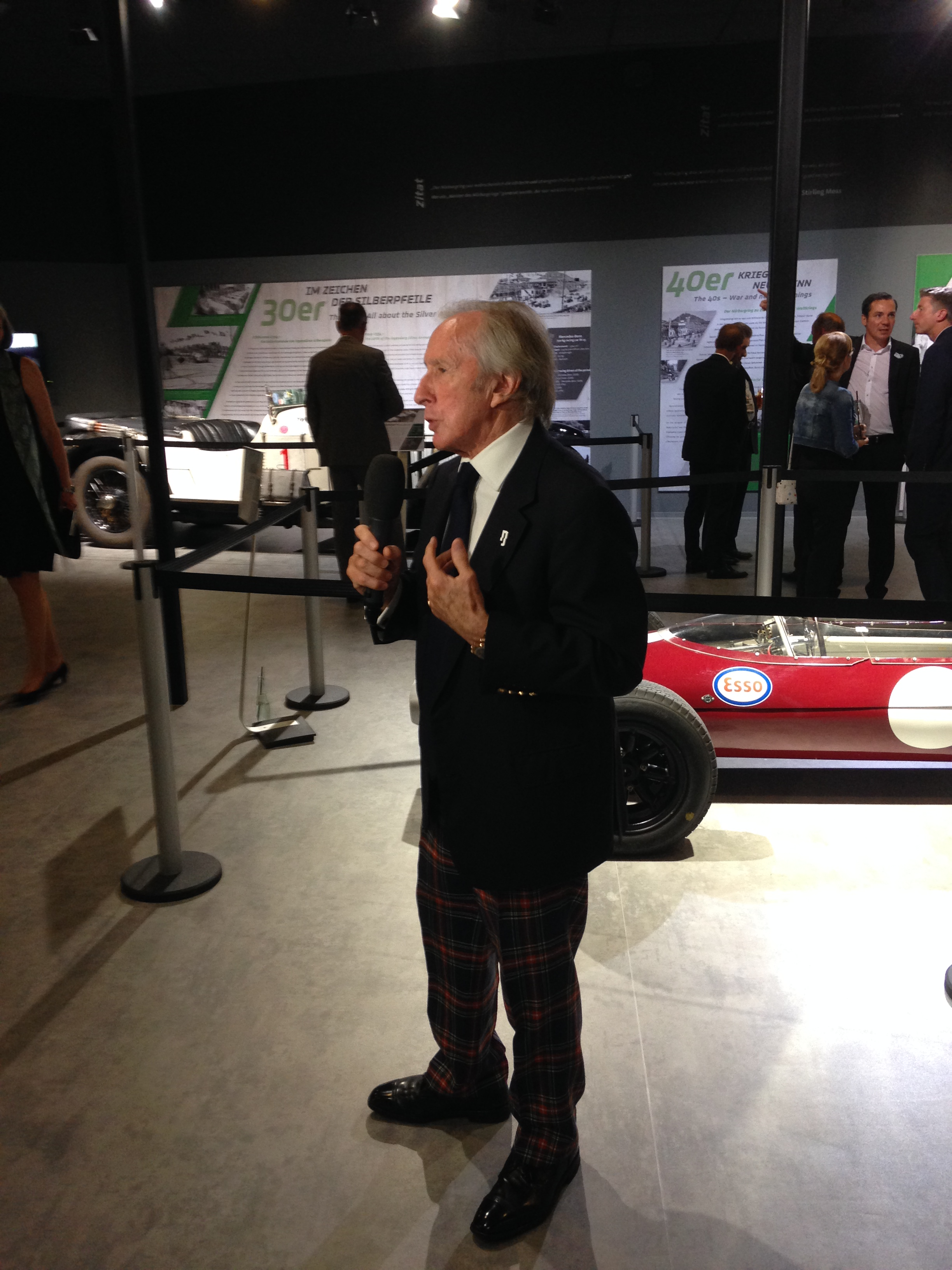
Jackie Steward eröffnet die Ausstellung im ring°werks.

Jackie Stewart, who coined the term "Green Hell" for the Nürburgring, was in attendance as a guest of honor and opened the Nürburgring exhibition "ring°marks" on Friday.

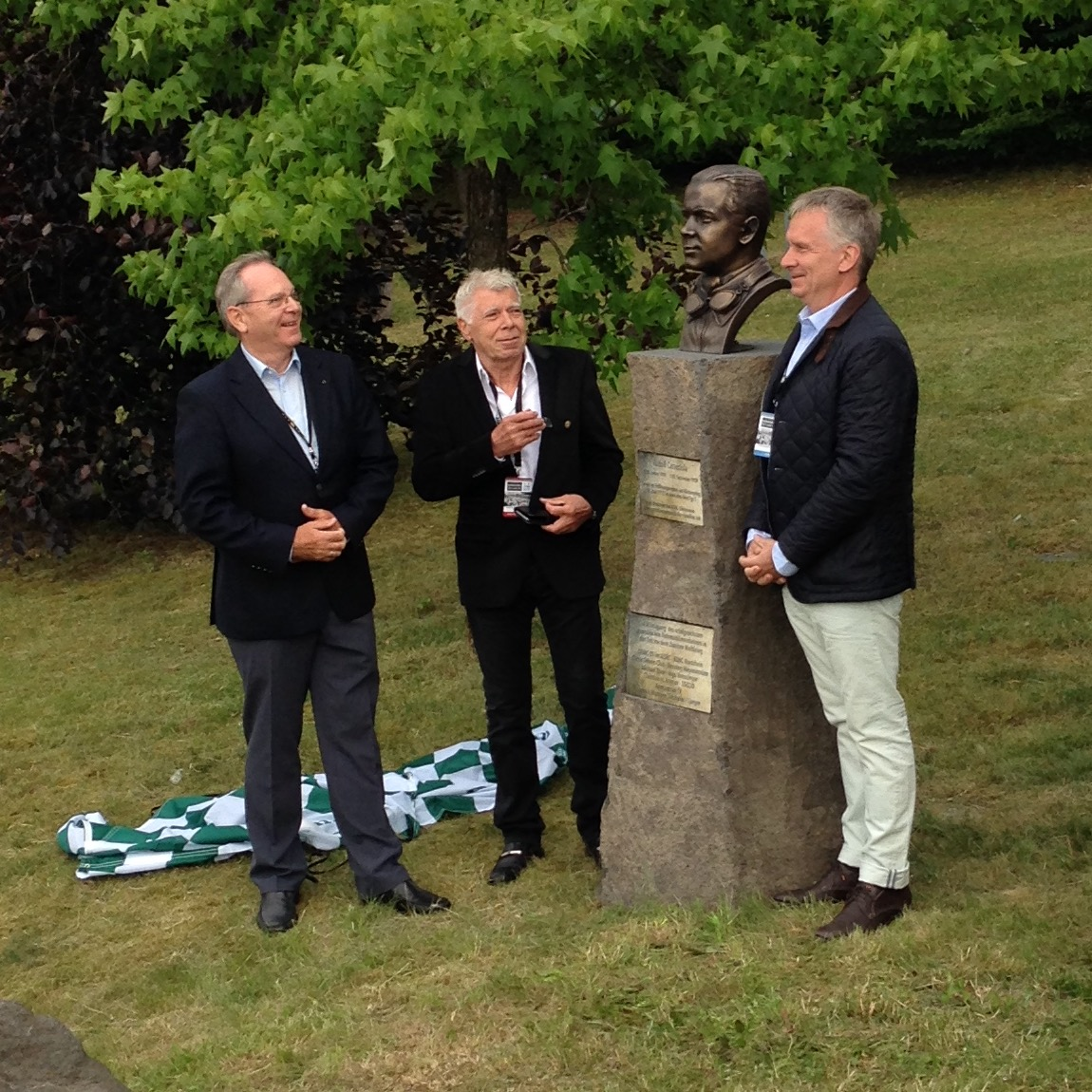
Unveiling of a Caracciola memorial column at the Nürburgring.

In honor of the 1927 winner, Rudolf Caracciola, Peter Meyer, president of ADAC North Rhine-Westphalia; Rainer Temme, honorary chairman of DAMC 05; and Thomas Caracciola, Rudolf Caracciola's great-nephew, unveiled a memorial column in the paddock during the event. Caracciola's winning car, the Mercedes-Benz 680 S from the Nürburgring exhibition, was also presented.

The racing series on the starting grid included the FHR-Dunlop Endurance Cup, the "Kampf der Zwerge", the Gentle Drivers Trophy, and the "Tourenwagen Classics". The "Tourenwagen Classics" races were commentated on by Rainer Braun and Christa Haas, just as they were during the DTM era.

The inaugural event already drew 17,000 spectators.

In November 2017, the members of DAMC 05 decided that the organization of the Nürburgring Classic would be spun off into the new company "DAMC 05 Veranstaltungs-GmbH", and that the association would assume the role of the idealistic sponsor.

In just the second year of the event's revival, around 700 participants were registered. In 2018, pre-war vehicles from more than eight countries and more than 25 different brands — including Bentley, Riley, Bugatti, Mercedes, Hotchkiss, Lagonda, and Amilcar — gathered in the "Old Paddock." The weekend of June 15–17 drew a crowd of over 20,000 spectators. The "Tourenwagen Classics, Youngtimer Trophy, FHR Endurance Trophy, and 100-Mile Trophy were back on the schedule, along with the Canadian-American Challenge Cup.

To make the 2019 weekend even more family-friendly, the supporting program was expanded to complement the racing events. That year, the racing program was complemented by an exhibition of historic race transporters, spread throughout the paddock. On Saturday, the day concluded with a live concert and fireworks, and during the day, a Ferris wheel served as a viewing platform.

Over the weekend of May 24–26, 2019, the track ultimately drew around 800 participants and nearly 25,000 spectators (according to the organizers).

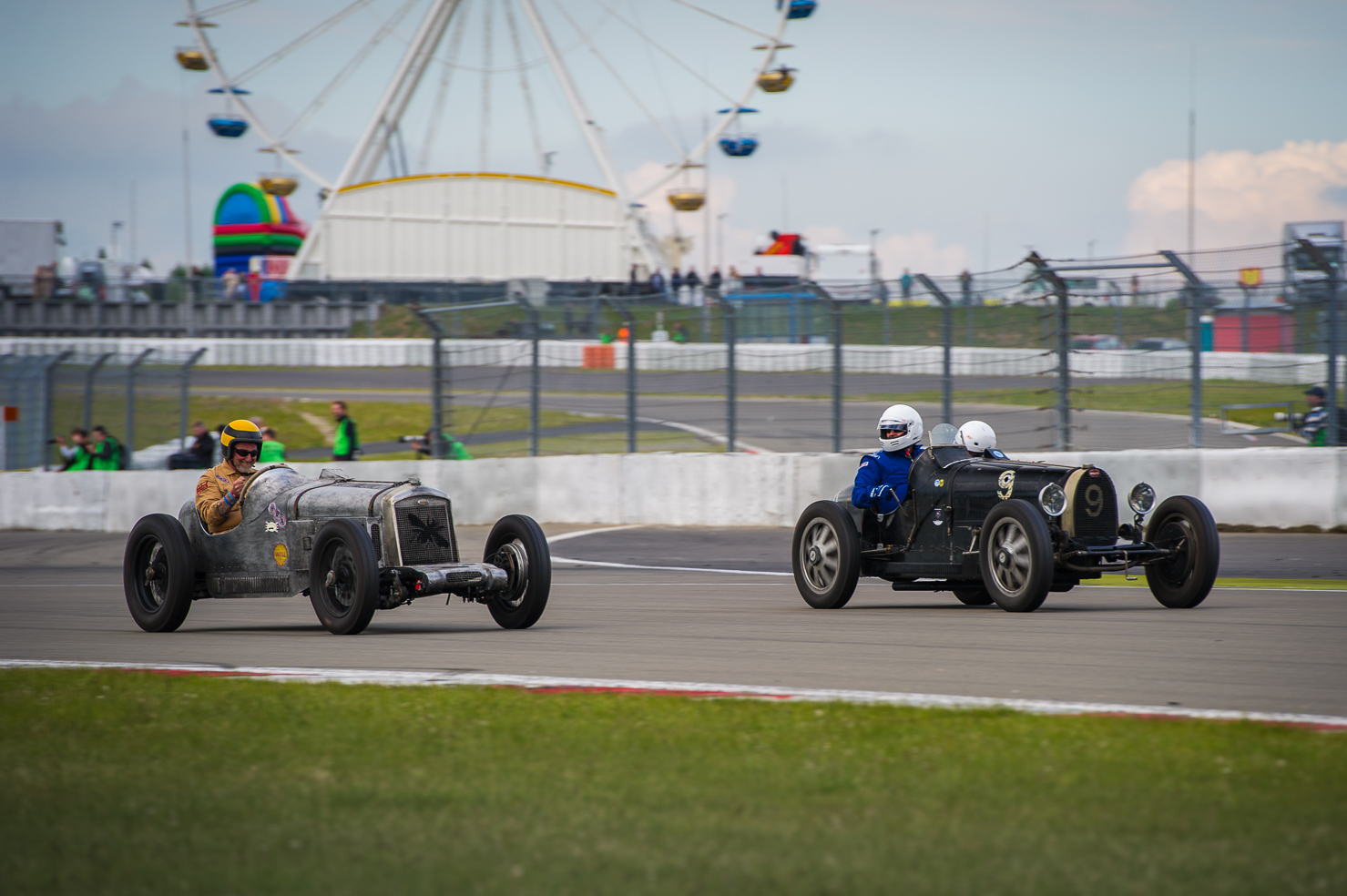
2019 "Elephant Race," Mercedes Arena with Ferris wheel

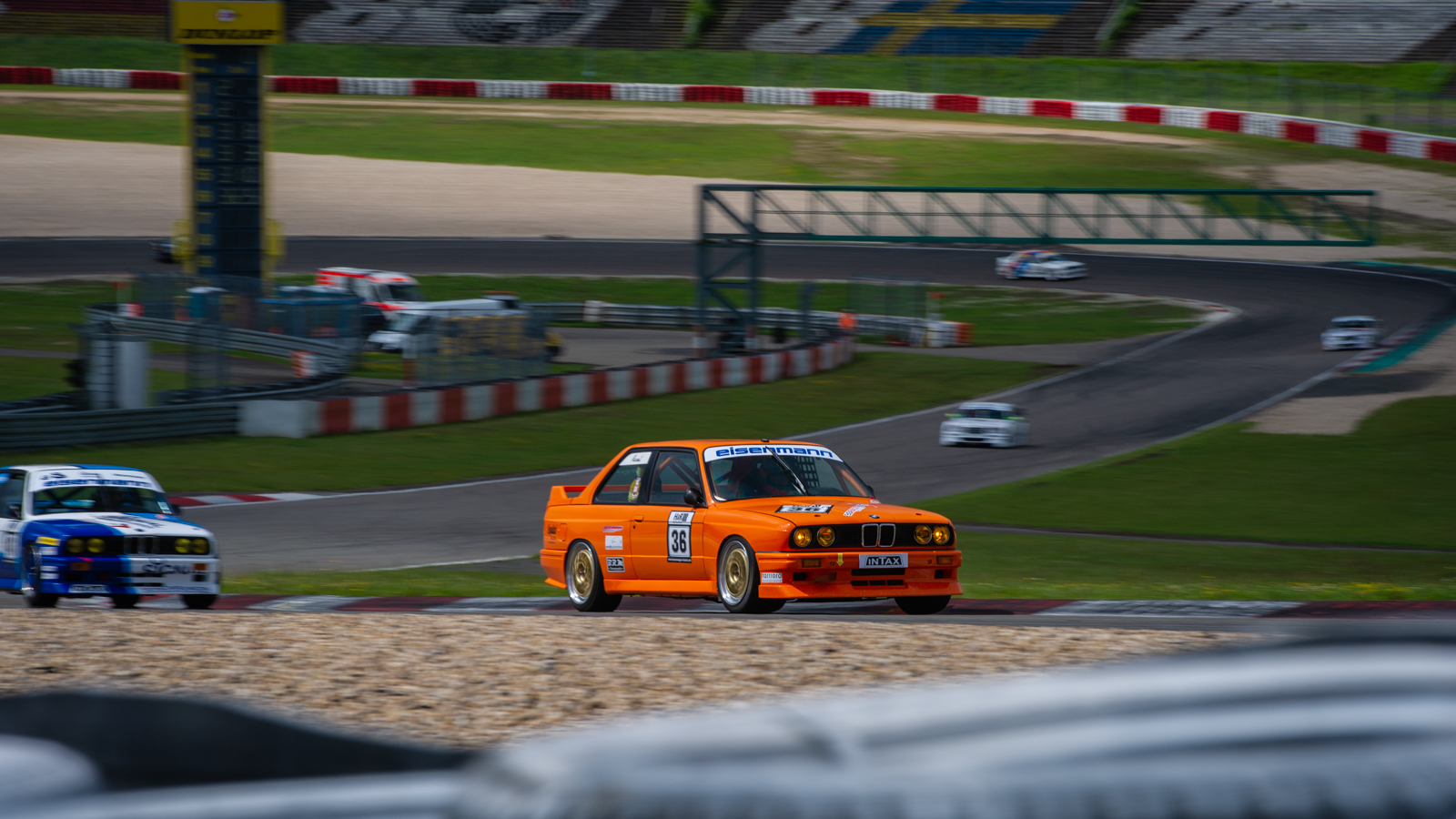
Tourenwagen Classics

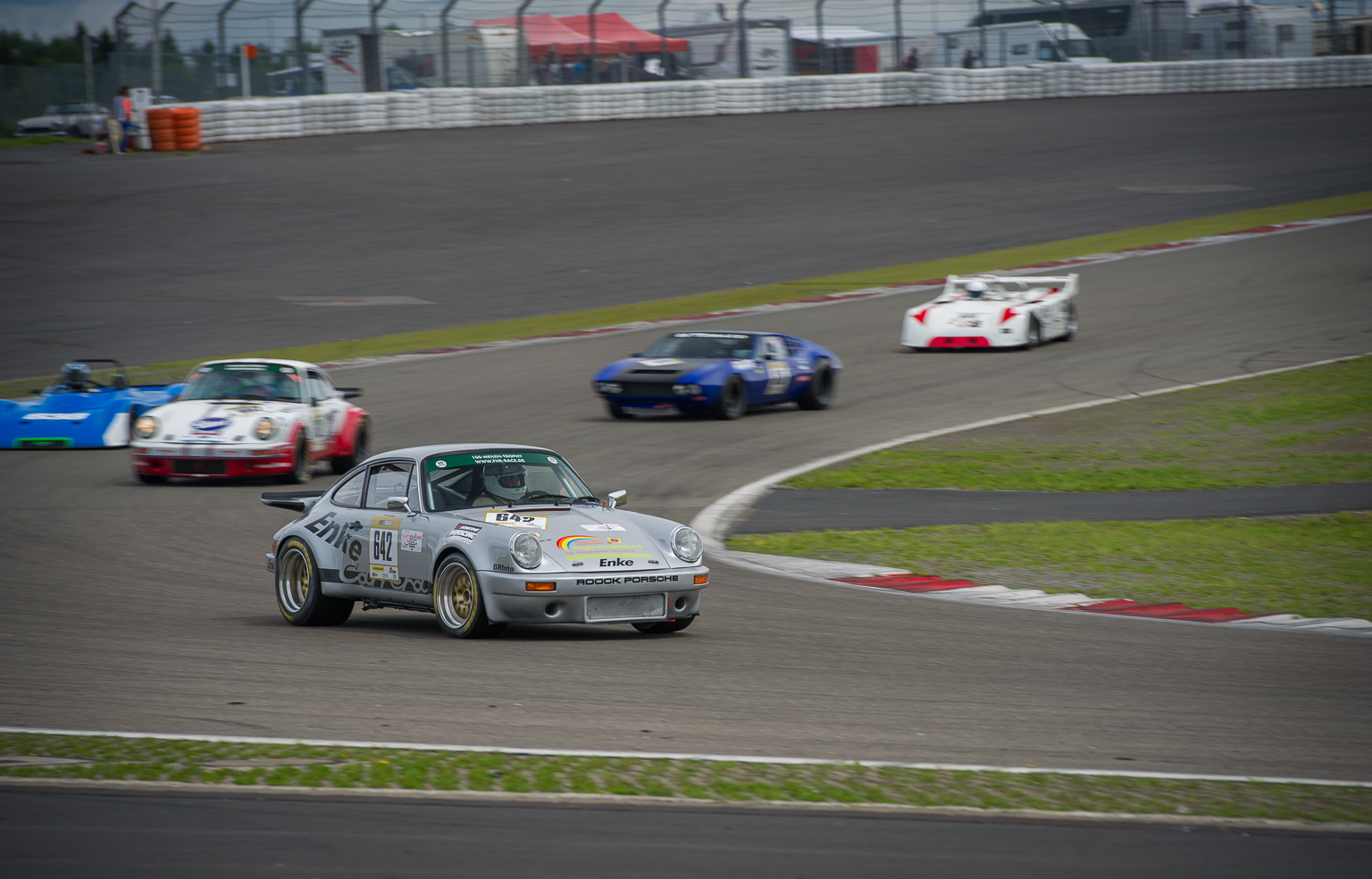
100 Meilen Trophy

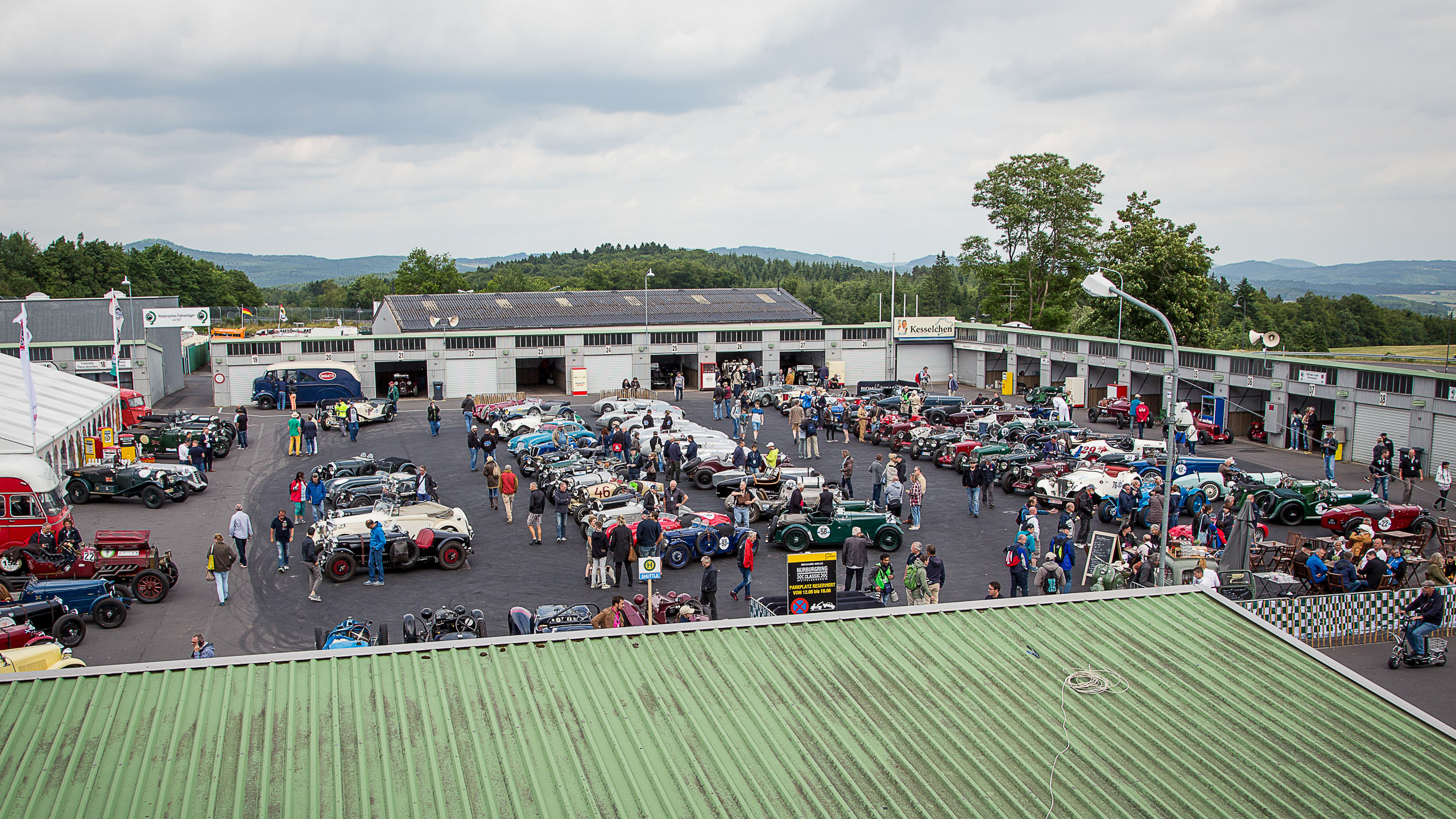
Prewar Meeting, Nürburgring Classic 2017

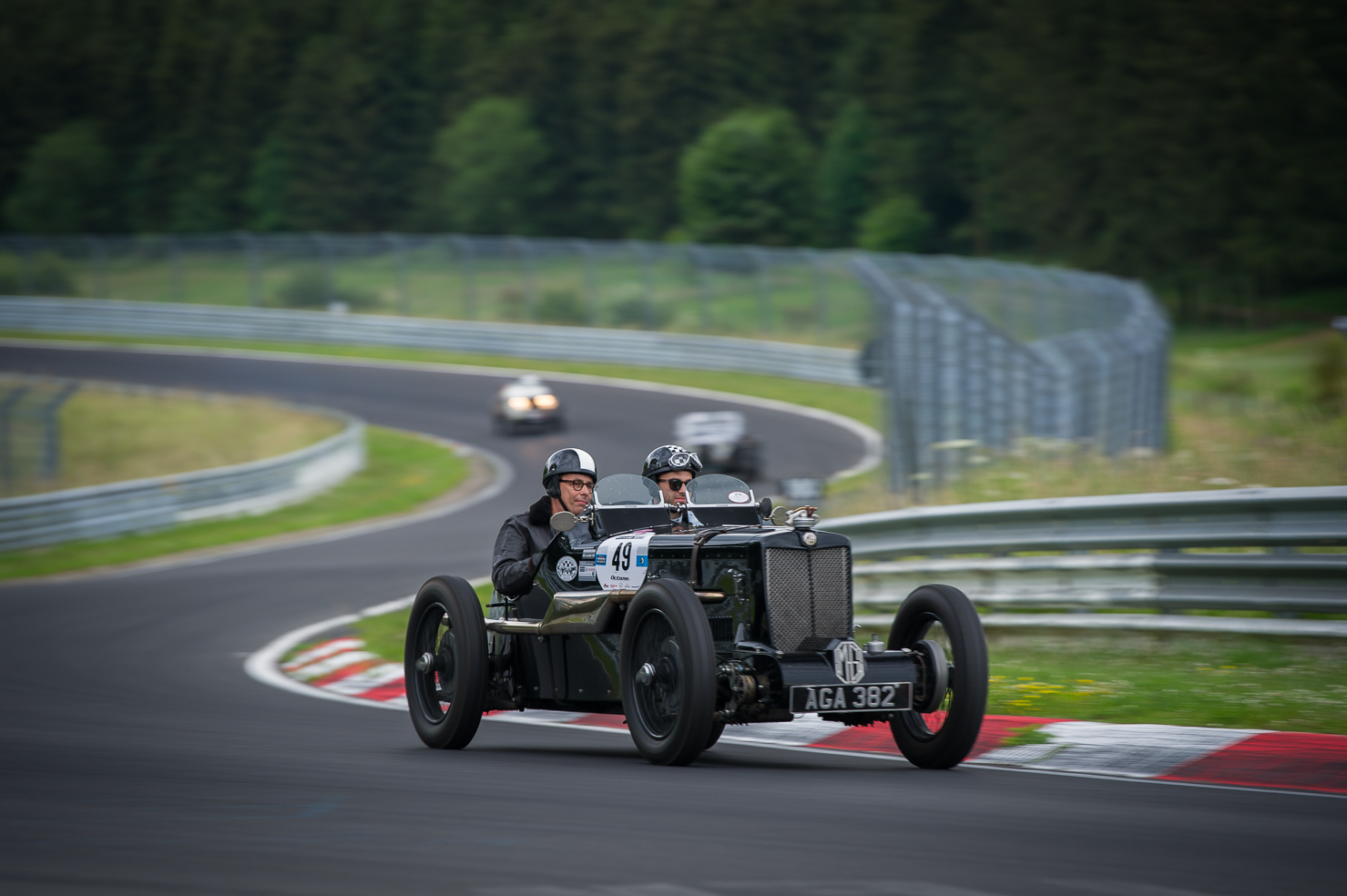
Pre-war vehicles on the Nordschleife

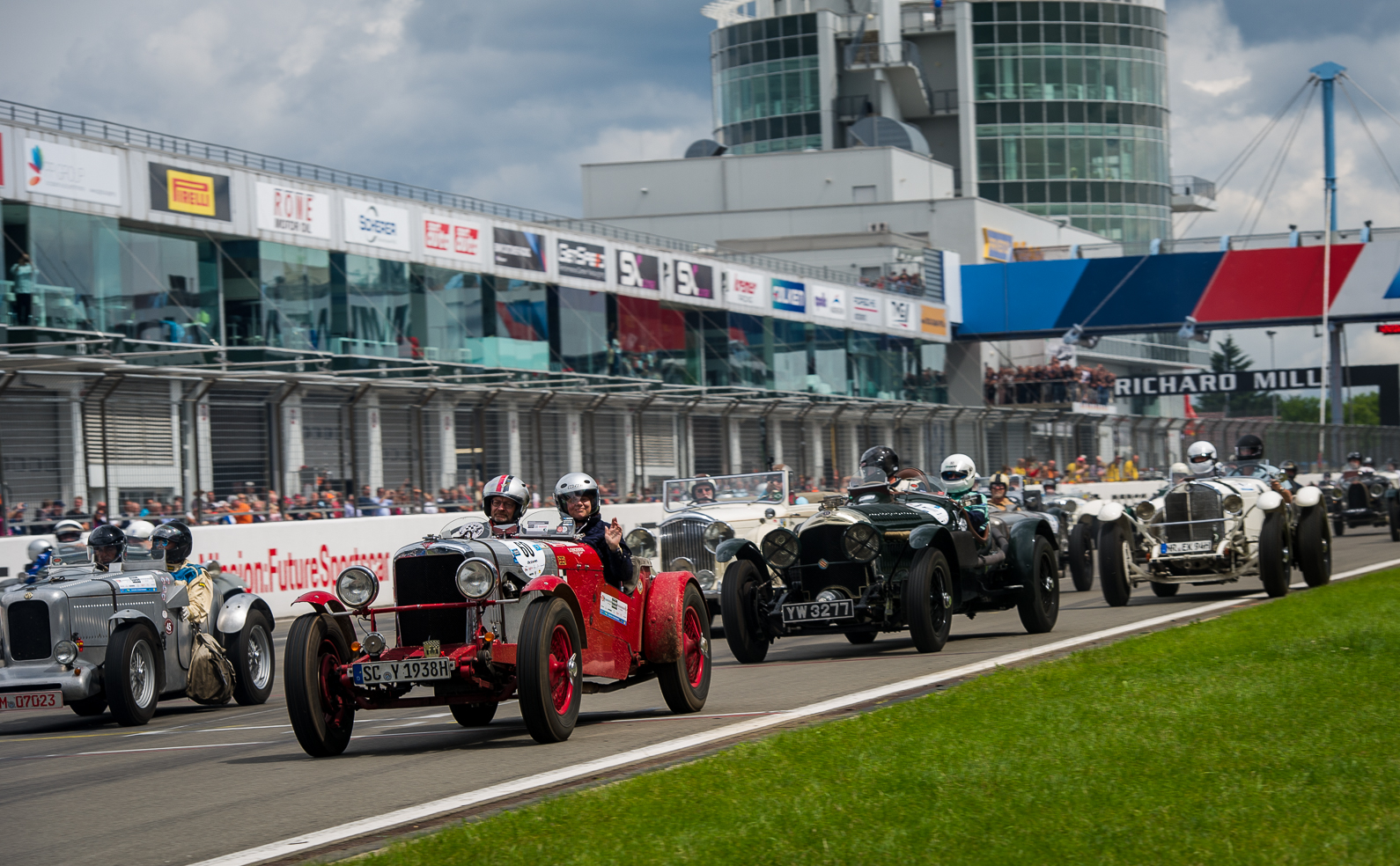
2018 "Elephant Race" Starting Lineup
