= 2020 6 Hours of Nürburgring =

Sports car endurance race in Germany

Map of the Nürburgring GP-Strecke, which was used for the race

The 2020 6 Hours of Nürburgring was an endurance sports car racing event held at the Nürburgring, Nürburg, Germany on 9 July 2020. The race was won by the #54 Porsche 991 GT3.

== Race result ==
Class winners are denoted in bold.

Pos	Class	No	Team	Drivers	Chassis	Grid	Laps	Time/Retired
Pos	Class	No	Team	Drivers	Engine	Grid	Laps	Time/Retired
1	**Pro**	**54**	**(Italy) Dinamic Motorsport**	**(Italy) Matteo Cairoli (Germany) Christian Engelhart (Germany) Sven Müller**	**Porsche 991 GT3 R .II**	**2**	**173**	**6:01:08.058**
1	**Pro**	**54**	**(Italy) Dinamic Motorsport**	**(Italy) Matteo Cairoli (Germany) Christian Engelhart (Germany) Sven Müller**	**Porsche F6 4v DOHC 3996cc N/A**	**2**	**173**	**6:01:08.058**
2	Pro	88	(France) AKKA ASP	(Italy) Raffaele Marciello (Russia) Timur Boguslavskiy (Brazil) Felipe Fraga	Mercedes-AMG GT3	13	173	+14.849
2	Pro	88	(France) AKKA ASP	(Italy) Raffaele Marciello (Russia) Timur Boguslavskiy (Brazil) Felipe Fraga	Mercedes-Benz M159 V8/90° 4V DOHC 6208cc N/A	13	173	+14.849
3	Pro	4	(Germany) HRT	(Germany) Maro Engel (Germany) Luca Stolz (France) Vincent Abril	Mercedes-AMG GT3	9	173	+17.823
3	Pro	4	(Germany) HRT	(Germany) Maro Engel (Germany) Luca Stolz (France) Vincent Abril	Mercedes-Benz M159 V8/90° 4V DOHC 6208cc N/A	9	173	+17.823
4	Pro	31	(Belgium) Belgian Audi Club Team WRT	(South Africa) Kelvin van der Linde (Italy) Mirko Bortolotti (Switzerland) Rolf Ineichen	Audi R8 LMS GT3	22	173	+32.568
4	Pro	31	(Belgium) Belgian Audi Club Team WRT	(South Africa) Kelvin van der Linde (Italy) Mirko Bortolotti (Switzerland) Rolf Ineichen	Audi V10/90° 4v DOHC 5205cc N/A	22	173	+32.568
5	Pro	32	(Belgium) Belgian Audi Club Team WRT	(Belgium) Dries Vanthoor (Germany) Christopher Mies (Belgium) Charles Weerts	Audi R8 LMS GT3	11	173	+32.807
5	Pro	32	(Belgium) Belgian Audi Club Team WRT	(Belgium) Dries Vanthoor (Germany) Christopher Mies (Belgium) Charles Weerts	Audi V10/90° 4v DOHC 5205cc N/A	11	173	+32.807
6	Pro	9	(United States) K-Pax Racing	(United Kingdom) Alex Buncombe (South Africa) Jordan Pepper (Spain) Andy Soucek	Bentley Continental GT3	19	173	+33.293
6	Pro	9	(United States) K-Pax Racing	(United Kingdom) Alex Buncombe (South Africa) Jordan Pepper (Spain) Andy Soucek	Bentley 4.0 TFSI V8/90° 4v DOHC 3993cc Twin-Turbo	19	173	+33.293
7	Pro	25	(France) Saintéloc Racing	(Germany) Markus Winkelhock (France) Dorian Boccolacci (Germany) Christopher Haase	Audi R8 LMS GT3	7	173	+35.300
7	Pro	25	(France) Saintéloc Racing	(Germany) Markus Winkelhock (France) Dorian Boccolacci (Germany) Christopher Haase	Audi V10/90° 4v DOHC 5205cc N/A	7	173	+35.300
8	Pro	100	(Germany) GetSpeed	(Germany) Maximilian Buhk (Germany) Fabian Schiller (Italy) Alessio Lorandi	Mercedes-AMG GT3	15	173	+38.267
8	Pro	100	(Germany) GetSpeed	(Germany) Maximilian Buhk (Germany) Fabian Schiller (Italy) Alessio Lorandi	Mercedes-Benz M159 V8/90° 4V DOHC 6208cc N/A	15	173	+38.267
9	Pro	98	(Germany) Rowe Racing	(Netherlands) Jeroen Bleekemolen (Switzerland) Simona de Silvestro (Germany) Timo Bernhard	Porsche 991 GT3 R .II	25	173	+49.012
9	Pro	98	(Germany) Rowe Racing	(Netherlands) Jeroen Bleekemolen (Switzerland) Simona de Silvestro (Germany) Timo Bernhard	Porsche F6 4v DOHC 3996cc N/A	25	173	+49.012
10	Pro	21	(Hong Kong) KCMG	(Italy) Edoardo Liberati (Australia) Josh Burdon (Switzerland) Alexandre Imperatori	Porsche 991 GT3 R .II	15	173	+50.211
10	Pro	21	(Hong Kong) KCMG	(Italy) Edoardo Liberati (Australia) Josh Burdon (Switzerland) Alexandre Imperatori	Porsche F6 4v DOHC 3996cc N/A	15	173	+50.211
11	Pro	69	(United Kingdom) Optimum Motorsport	(United Kingdom) Oli Wilkinson (United Kingdom) Rob Bell (United Kingdom) Joe Osborne	McLaren 720S GT3	21	173	+1:06.219
11	Pro	69	(United Kingdom) Optimum Motorsport	(United Kingdom) Oli Wilkinson (United Kingdom) Rob Bell (United Kingdom) Joe Osborne	McLaren M840T V8/90° 4v DOHC 3994cc Twin-Turbo	21	173	+1:06.219
12	**Silver**	**159**	**(United Kingdom) Garage 59**	**(United Kingdom) James Pull (France) Valentin Hasse-Clot (United Kingdom) Andrew Watson**	**Aston Martin Vantage AMR GT3**	**23**	**173**	**+1:21.889**
12	**Silver**	**159**	**(United Kingdom) Garage 59**	**(United Kingdom) James Pull (France) Valentin Hasse-Clot (United Kingdom) Andrew Watson**	**Aston Martin Mercedes-AMG M177/AMR V8/90° 4v DOHC 3982cc 2xBorg Warner**	**23**	**173**	**+1:21.889**
13	Silver	78	(United Kingdom) Barwell Motorsport	(Finland) Patrick Kujala (United Kingdom) Alex MacDowall (Denmark) Frederik Schandorff	Lamborghini Huracán GT3 Evo	18	173	+1:22.131
13	Silver	78	(United Kingdom) Barwell Motorsport	(Finland) Patrick Kujala (United Kingdom) Alex MacDowall (Denmark) Frederik Schandorff	Lamborghini V10/90° 4v DOHC 5204cc N/A	18	173	+1:22.131
14	Pro	72	(Russia) SMP Racing	(Spain) Miguel Molina (Italy) Davide Rigon (Russia) Sergey Sirotkin	Ferrari 488 GT3	6	173	
14	Pro	72	(Russia) SMP Racing	(Spain) Miguel Molina (Italy) Davide Rigon (Russia) Sergey Sirotkin	Ferrari F154CB V8/90° 4v DOHC 3902cc Twin-Turbo	6	173	
15	Pro	107	(France) CMR	(France) Nelson Panciatici (France) Pierre-Alexandre Jean (United Kingdom) Seb Morris	Bentley Continental GT3	16	173	+1:47.441
15	Pro	107	(France) CMR	(France) Nelson Panciatici (France) Pierre-Alexandre Jean (United Kingdom) Seb Morris	Bentley 4.0 TFSI V8/90° 4v DOHC 3993cc Twin-Turbo	16	173	+1:47.441
16	**Pro-Am**	**19**	**(China) Orange1 FFF Racing Team**	**(Germany) Elia Erhart (Japan) Hiroshi Hamaguchi (United Kingdom) Phil Keen**	**Lamborghini Huracán GT3 Evo**	**33**	**173**	**+1 laps**
16	**Pro-Am**	**19**	**(China) Orange1 FFF Racing Team**	**(Germany) Elia Erhart (Japan) Hiroshi Hamaguchi (United Kingdom) Phil Keen**	**Lamborghini V10/90° 4v DOHC 5204cc N/A**	**33**	**173**	**+1 laps**
17	Pro	63	(China) Orange1 FFF Racing Team	(Denmark) Dennis Lind (Italy) Andrea Caldarelli (Italy) Marco Mapelli	Lamborghini Huracán GT3 Evo	12	172	+1 Lap
17	Pro	63	(China) Orange1 FFF Racing Team	(Denmark) Dennis Lind (Italy) Andrea Caldarelli (Italy) Marco Mapelli	Lamborghini V10/90° 4v DOHC 5204cc N/A	12	172	+1 Lap
18	Silver	90	(Spain) Madpanda Motorsport	(Argentina) Ezequiel Pérez Companc (Germany) Patrick Assenheimer (France) Romain Monti	Mercedes-AMG GT3	26	172	+1 lap
18	Silver	90	(Spain) Madpanda Motorsport	(Argentina) Ezequiel Pérez Companc (Germany) Patrick Assenheimer (France) Romain Monti	Mercedes-Benz M159 V8/90° 4V DOHC 6208cc N/A	26	172	+1 lap
19	Pro	40	(United Arab Emirates) GPX Racing	(France) Romain Dumas (Norway) Dennis Olsen (Austria) Thomas Preining	Porsche 991 GT3 R .II	1	172	+1 lap
19	Pro	40	(United Arab Emirates) GPX Racing	(France) Romain Dumas (Norway) Dennis Olsen (Austria) Thomas Preining	Porsche F6 4v DOHC 3996cc N/A	1	172	+1 lap
20	Pro-Am	991	(Germany) Herberth Motorsport	(Switzerland) Daniel Allemann (Germany) Ralf Bohn (Germany) Robert Renauer	Porsche 991 GT3 R .II	38	172	+1 lap
20	Pro-Am	991	(Germany) Herberth Motorsport	(Switzerland) Daniel Allemann (Germany) Ralf Bohn (Germany) Robert Renauer	Porsche F6 4v DOHC 3996cc N/A	38	172	+1 lap
21	Pro-Am	87	(France) AKKA ASP	(France) Thomas Drouet (France) Jim Pla (France) Fabien Barthez	Mercedes-AMG GT3	32	172	+1 lap
21	Pro-Am	87	(France) AKKA ASP	(France) Thomas Drouet (France) Jim Pla (France) Fabien Barthez	Mercedes-Benz M159 V8/90° 4V DOHC 6208cc N/A	32	172	+1 lap
22	Pro-Am	74	(United Kingdom) Ram Racing	(Netherlands) Remon Vos (Austria) Martin Konrad (United Kingdom) Tom Onslow-Cole	Mercedes-AMG GT3	40	172	+1 lap
22	Pro-Am	74	(United Kingdom) Ram Racing	(Netherlands) Remon Vos (Austria) Martin Konrad (United Kingdom) Tom Onslow-Cole	Mercedes-Benz M159 V8/90° 4V DOHC 6208cc N/A	40	172	+1 lap
23	Pro-Am	52	(Italy) AF Corse	(Netherlands) Nick Hommerson (Belgium) Louis Machiels (Italy) Andrea Bertolini	Ferrari 488 GT3	37	172	+1 lap
23	Pro-Am	52	(Italy) AF Corse	(Netherlands) Nick Hommerson (Belgium) Louis Machiels (Italy) Andrea Bertolini	Ferrari F154CB V8/90° 4v DOHC 3902cc Twin-Turbo	37	172	+1 lap
24	Silver	55	(Germany) Attempto Racing	(United Kingdom) Finlay Hutchinson (Germany) Alex Aka (Austria) Nicolas Schöll	Audi R8 LMS GT3	28	172	+1 lap
24	Silver	55	(Germany) Attempto Racing	(United Kingdom) Finlay Hutchinson (Germany) Alex Aka (Austria) Nicolas Schöll	Audi V10/90° 4v DOHC 5205cc N/A	28	172	+1 lap
25	Pro-Am	77	(United Kingdom) Barwell Motorsport	(United Kingdom) Rob Collard (Russia) Leo Machitski (United Kingdom) Sandy Mitchell	Lamborghini Huracán GT3 Evo	34	171	+2 laps
25	Pro-Am	77	(United Kingdom) Barwell Motorsport	(United Kingdom) Rob Collard (Russia) Leo Machitski (United Kingdom) Sandy Mitchell	Lamborghini V10/90° 4v DOHC 5204cc N/A	34	171	+2 laps
26	Silver	555	(China) Orange1 FFF Racing Team	(Belgium) Baptiste Moulin (Venezuela) Jonathan Cecotto (United Kingdom) Ricky Collard	Lamborghini Huracán GT3 Evo	35	171	+2 laps
26	Silver	555	(China) Orange1 FFF Racing Team	(Belgium) Baptiste Moulin (Venezuela) Jonathan Cecotto (United Kingdom) Ricky Collard	Lamborghini V10/90° 4v DOHC 5204cc N/A	35	171	+2 laps
27	Silver	5	(Germany) HRT	(Russia) Sergey Afanasyev (Germany) Hubert Haupt (Switzerland) Joël Camathias	Mercedes-AMG GT3	46	171	+2 laps
27	Silver	5	(Germany) HRT	(Russia) Sergey Afanasyev (Germany) Hubert Haupt (Switzerland) Joël Camathias	Mercedes-Benz M159 V8/90° 4V DOHC 6208cc N/A	46	171	+2 laps
28	Pro-Am	488	(Germany) Rinaldi Racing	(Germany) Pierre Ehret (Italy) Rino Mastronardi (Germany) Daniel Keilwitz	Ferrari 488 GT3	39	171	+2 laps
28	Pro-Am	488	(Germany) Rinaldi Racing	(Germany) Pierre Ehret (Italy) Rino Mastronardi (Germany) Daniel Keilwitz	Ferrari F154CB V8/90° 4v DOHC 3902cc Twin-Turbo	39	171	+2 laps
29	Pro-Am	108	(France) CMR	(France) Romano Ricci (France) Stéphane Tribaudini (Romania) Răzvan Umbrărescu	Bentley Continental GT3	42	171	+2 laps
29	Pro-Am	108	(France) CMR	(France) Romano Ricci (France) Stéphane Tribaudini (Romania) Răzvan Umbrărescu	Bentley 4.0 TFSI V8/90° 4v DOHC 3993cc Twin-Turbo	42	171	+2 laps
30	Silver	56	(Italy) Dinamic Motorsport	(Italy) Andrea Rizzoli (Belgium) Adrien de Leener (Denmark) Mikkel Pedersen	Porsche 991 GT3 R .II	31	171	+2 laps
30	Silver	56	(Italy) Dinamic Motorsport	(Italy) Andrea Rizzoli (Belgium) Adrien de Leener (Denmark) Mikkel Pedersen	Porsche F6 4v DOHC 3996cc N/A	31	171	+2 laps
31	Pro-Am	44	(Germany) SPS Automotive Performance	(Germany) Nico Bastian (Germany) Florian Scholze (Germany) Christian Hook	Mercedes-AMG GT3	44	171	+2 laps
31	Pro-Am	44	(Germany) SPS Automotive Performance	(Germany) Nico Bastian (Germany) Florian Scholze (Germany) Christian Hook	Mercedes-Benz M159 V8/90° 4V DOHC 6208cc N/A	44	171	+2 laps
32	Pro-Am	93	(United Kingdom) SKY-Tempesta Racing	(United Kingdom) Chris Froggatt (Hong Kong) Jonathan Hui (Italy) Edward Cheever	Ferrari 488 GT3	41	170	+3 laps
32	Pro-Am	93	(United Kingdom) SKY-Tempesta Racing	(United Kingdom) Chris Froggatt (Hong Kong) Jonathan Hui (Italy) Edward Cheever	Ferrari F154CB V8/90° 4v DOHC 3902cc Twin-Turbo	41	170	+3 laps
33	Pro-Am	188	(United Kingdom) Garage 59	(United Kingdom) Chris Goodwin (Sweden) Alexander West (United Kingdom) Jonathan Adam	Aston Martin Vantage AMR GT3	36	170	+3 laps
33	Pro-Am	188	(United Kingdom) Garage 59	(United Kingdom) Chris Goodwin (Sweden) Alexander West (United Kingdom) Jonathan Adam	Aston Martin Mercedes-AMG M177/AMR V8/90° 4v DOHC 3982cc 2xBorg Warner	36	170	+3 laps
34	Pro-Am	992	(Germany) Herberth Motorsport	(Greece) Dimitrios Konstantinou (Germany) Jürgen Häring (Germany) Alfred Renauer	Porsche 991 GT3 R .II	45	169	+4 laps
34	Pro-Am	992	(Germany) Herberth Motorsport	(Greece) Dimitrios Konstantinou (Germany) Jürgen Häring (Germany) Alfred Renauer	Porsche F6 4v DOHC 3996cc N/A	45	169	+4 laps
35	Pro	111	(Poland) JP Motorsport	(Poland) Patryk Krupinski (Austria) Mathias Lauda (Austria) Christian Klien	Mercedes-AMG GT3	43	169	+4 laps
35	Pro	111	(Poland) JP Motorsport	(Poland) Patryk Krupinski (Austria) Mathias Lauda (Austria) Christian Klien	Mercedes-Benz M159 V8/90° 4V DOHC 6208cc N/A	43	169	+4 laps
36	**Am**	**26**	**(France) Saintéloc Racing**	**(France) Michael Blanchemain (Belgium) Pierre-Yves Paque (Luxembourg) Clement Seyler**	**Audi R8 LMS GT3**	**48**	**166**	**+7 laps**
36	**Am**	**26**	**(France) Saintéloc Racing**	**(France) Michael Blanchemain (Belgium) Pierre-Yves Paque (Luxembourg) Clement Seyler**	**Audi V10/90° 4v DOHC 5205cc N/A**	**48**	**166**	**+7 laps**
37	Silver	11	(United Kingdom) Team Parker Racing	(United Kingdom) Frank Bird (United Kingdom) Euan McKay (Denmark) Nicolai Kjærgaard	Bentley Continental GT3	27	165	+8 laps
37	Silver	11	(United Kingdom) Team Parker Racing	(United Kingdom) Frank Bird (United Kingdom) Euan McKay (Denmark) Nicolai Kjærgaard	Bentley 4.0 TFSI V8/90° 4v DOHC 3993cc Twin-Turbo	27	165	+8 laps
38	Silver	89	(France) AKKA ASP	(Switzerland) Alex Fontana (Switzerland) Lucas Légeret (Chile) Benjamín Hites	Mercedes-AMG GT3	29	165	+8 laps
38	Silver	89	(France) AKKA ASP	(Switzerland) Alex Fontana (Switzerland) Lucas Légeret (Chile) Benjamín Hites	Mercedes-Benz M159 V8/90° 4V DOHC 6208cc N/A	29	165	+8 laps
39	Silver	15	(France) Tech 1 Racing	(France) Aurélien Panis (France) Timothé Buret (France) Thomas Neubauer	Lexus RCF GT3	20	157	+16 laps
39	Silver	15	(France) Tech 1 Racing	(France) Aurélien Panis (France) Timothé Buret (France) Thomas Neubauer	Lexus V8 5400cc N/A	20	157	+16 laps
DNF	Pro	14	(Switzerland) Emil Frey Racing	(Switzerland) Ricardo Feller (Austria) Norbert Siedler (Canada) Mikaël Grenier	Lamborghini Huracán GT3 Evo	14	112	+61 laps
DNF	Pro	14	(Switzerland) Emil Frey Racing	(Switzerland) Ricardo Feller (Austria) Norbert Siedler (Canada) Mikaël Grenier	Lamborghini V10/90° 4v DOHC 5204cc N/A	14	112	+61 laps
DNF	Pro	12	(United Arab Emirates) GPX Racing	(Australia) Matt Campbell (France) Patrick Pilet (France) Mathieu Jaminet	Porsche 991 GT3 R .II	8	108	+65 laps
DNF	Pro	12	(United Arab Emirates) GPX Racing	(Australia) Matt Campbell (France) Patrick Pilet (France) Mathieu Jaminet	Porsche F6 4v DOHC 3996cc N/A	8	108	+65 laps
DNF	Pro-Am	10	(Belgium) Boutsen Ginion Racing	(France) Gilles Vannelet (Saudi Arabia) Karim Ojjeh (Germany) Jens Klingmann	BMW M6 F13 GT3	47	104	+69 laps
DNF	Pro-Am	10	(Belgium) Boutsen Ginion Racing	(France) Gilles Vannelet (Saudi Arabia) Karim Ojjeh (Germany) Jens Klingmann	BMW P63 V8/90° 4395cc Twin-Turbo	47	104	+69 laps
DNF	Pro	66	(Germany) Attempto Racing	(Italy) Mattia Drudi (Germany) Kim-Luis Schramm (Belgium) Frederic Vervisch	Audi R8 LMS GT3	4	79	+94 laps
DNF	Pro	66	(Germany) Attempto Racing	(Italy) Mattia Drudi (Germany) Kim-Luis Schramm (Belgium) Frederic Vervisch	Audi V10/90° 4v DOHC 5205cc N/A	4	79	+94 laps
DNF	Pro	3	(United States) K-Pax Racing	(Brazil) Rodrigo Baptista (Belgium) Maxime Soulet (France) Jules Gounon	Bentley Continental GT3	10	13	+160 laps
DNF	Pro	3	(United States) K-Pax Racing	(Brazil) Rodrigo Baptista (Belgium) Maxime Soulet (France) Jules Gounon	Bentley 4.0 TFSI V8/90° 4v DOHC 3993cc Twin-Turbo	10	13	+160 laps
DNF	Silver	33	(Belgium) Belgian Audi Club Team WRT	(Netherlands) Rik Breukers (United Kingdom) Stuart Hall (Denmark) Benjamin Goethe	Audi R8 LMS GT3	30	12	+161 laps
DNF	Silver	33	(Belgium) Belgian Audi Club Team WRT	(Netherlands) Rik Breukers (United Kingdom) Stuart Hall (Denmark) Benjamin Goethe	Audi V10/90° 4v DOHC 5205cc N/A	30	12	+161 laps
DNF	Pro	163	(Switzerland) Emil Frey Racing	(France) Franck Perera (Italy) Giacomo Altoè (Spain) Albert Costa	Lamborghini Huracán GT3 Evo	3	2	+171 laps
DNF	Pro	163	(Switzerland) Emil Frey Racing	(France) Franck Perera (Italy) Giacomo Altoè (Spain) Albert Costa	Lamborghini V10/90° 4v DOHC 5204cc N/A	3	2	+171 laps
DNS	Pro	51	(Italy) AF Corse	(Italy) Alessandro Pier Guidi (Denmark) Nicklas Nielsen (United Kingdom) James Calado	Ferrari 488 GT3	5	0	DNS
DNS	Pro	51	(Italy) AF Corse	(Italy) Alessandro Pier Guidi (Denmark) Nicklas Nielsen (United Kingdom) James Calado	Ferrari F154CB V8/90° 4v DOHC 3902cc Twin-Turbo	5	0	DNS
DNS	Pro	99	(Germany) Rowe Racing	(Germany) Dirk Werner (France) Julien Andlauer (Austria) Klaus Bechler	Porsche 991 GT3 R .II	17	0	DNS
DNS	Pro	99	(Germany) Rowe Racing	(Germany) Dirk Werner (France) Julien Andlauer (Austria) Klaus Bechler	Porsche F6 4v DOHC 3996cc N/A	17	0	DNS
