= Düsseldorfer Automobil- und Motorsport-Club 05 =

Local club of the ADAC in Düsseldorf

Düsseldorfer Automobil- und Motorsport-Club 05 e.V. im ADAC
- Abbreviation: DAMC 05
- Formation: 27 May 1905
- Type: Sports club
- Purpose: Motorists' issues Motorsports
- Location: Düsseldorf, Germany
- President: Ingo Brenzinger
- Website: www.damc05.de

The Düsseldorfer Automobil- und Motorsport-Club 05 e.V. im ADAC is a local club of the ADAC (German automobile club), located in Düsseldorf, Germany. The DAMC 05 is the idealistic sponsor of the Nürburgring Classic and the 1000km Nürburgring. The club has organized a myriad of events, such as the Oldtimer Festival, Eifelrennen, and Historic Trophy, at the race track.

== Formation ==
The club is one of the oldest motor sport clubs in Germany. It was founded on 27 May 1905 as the Motorrad-Club Düsseldorf (Motorcycle Club Düsseldorf), which only six months later joined the equally new Düsseldorfer Motorradfahrer-Vereinigung (Düsseldorf Motorcyclists' Association).

Even before the outbreak of World War 1, the club organised motor-sport meetings such as reliability runs. Later on, important oval-track motorcycle races took place in Düsseldorf. The club members were successful in these and in other events. Ralph Roese, Jupp Müller and Itz Rosenbaum had numerous victories on tracks all over Germany. Müller was twice German Champion in all categories. To the present day the names of Heinz Kürten, Alfred Noll, Toni Ulmen and Kurt C. Volkhart are commonly heard amongst enthusiasts of motorcycle and car races.

After the war, the Eifelrennen and the German TT in Nideggen in the Eifel mountains were the biggest events the club drivers took part in.

== Self-liquidation and refounding ==
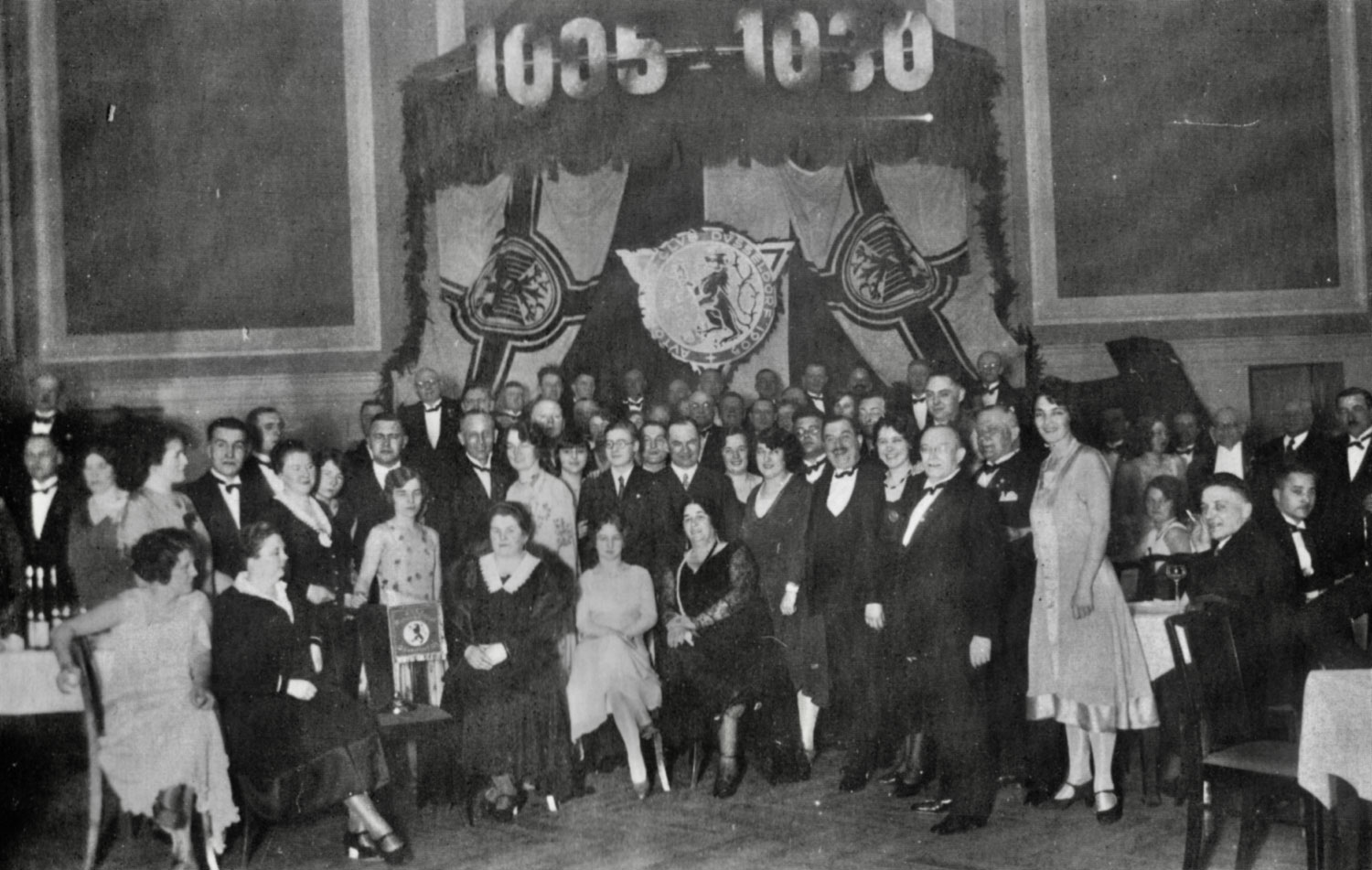
25th anniversary 1930

In 1933 the club made the decision to close down. However, only one year after the end of World War 2, former club members Hermann Schlessmann, Toni Ulmen, Josef Jacobs, Werner Seidel, Jules Köther, Erich Hebmüller, Itz Rosenbaum and Heinz Müller founded the new club, called the Düsseldorfer Automobil- und Motorsport-Club 05 (ADAC), abbreviated to DAMC 05. One year later the Kölner Club für Motorsport (Cologne Motorsports Club), the Bergischer Motorclub and DAMC 05 together founded the ADAC Nordrhein.

== Activities ==
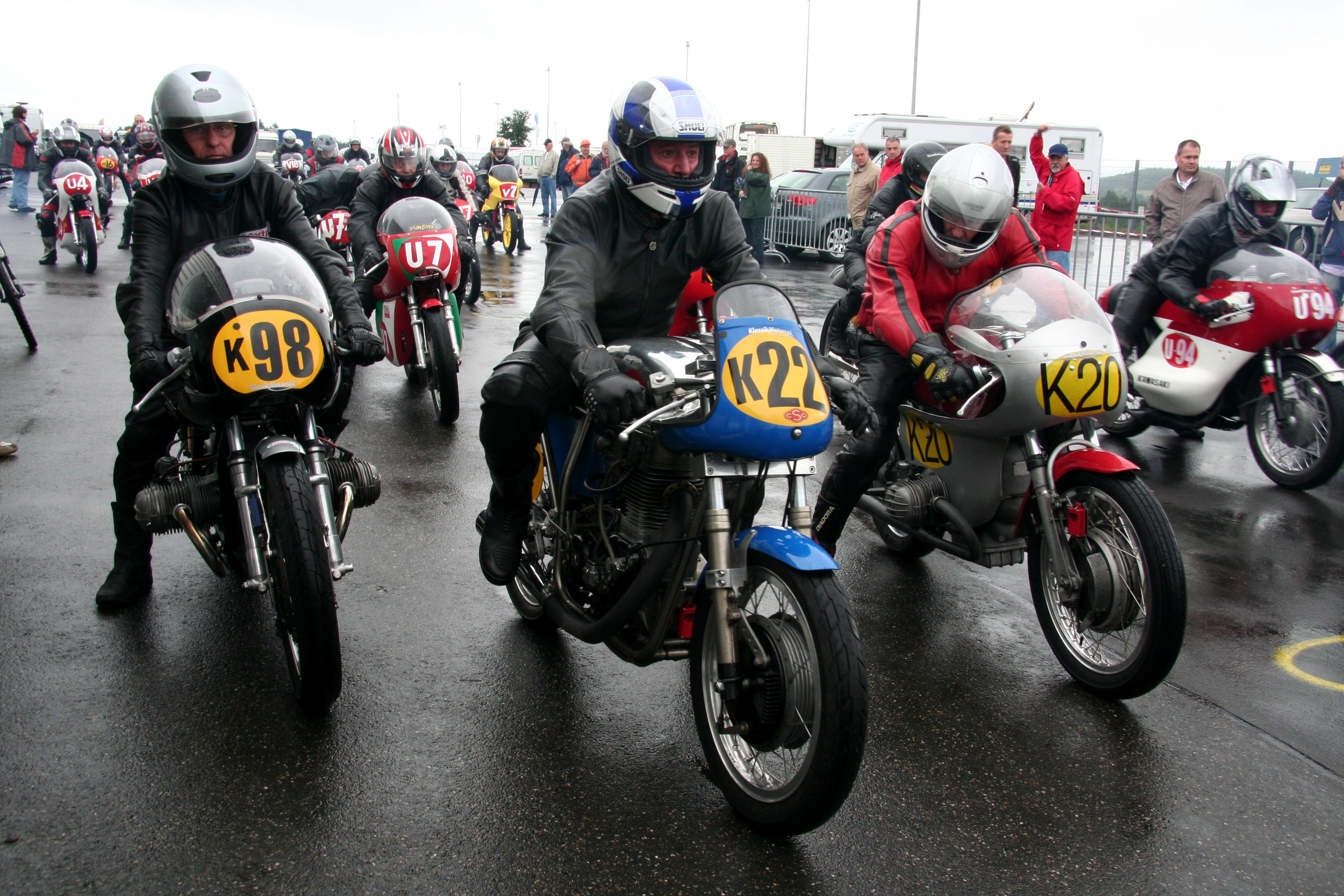
2007 at the Oldtimer Festival of DAMC 05 at the pre-start in the new Nürburgring riders' enclosure.

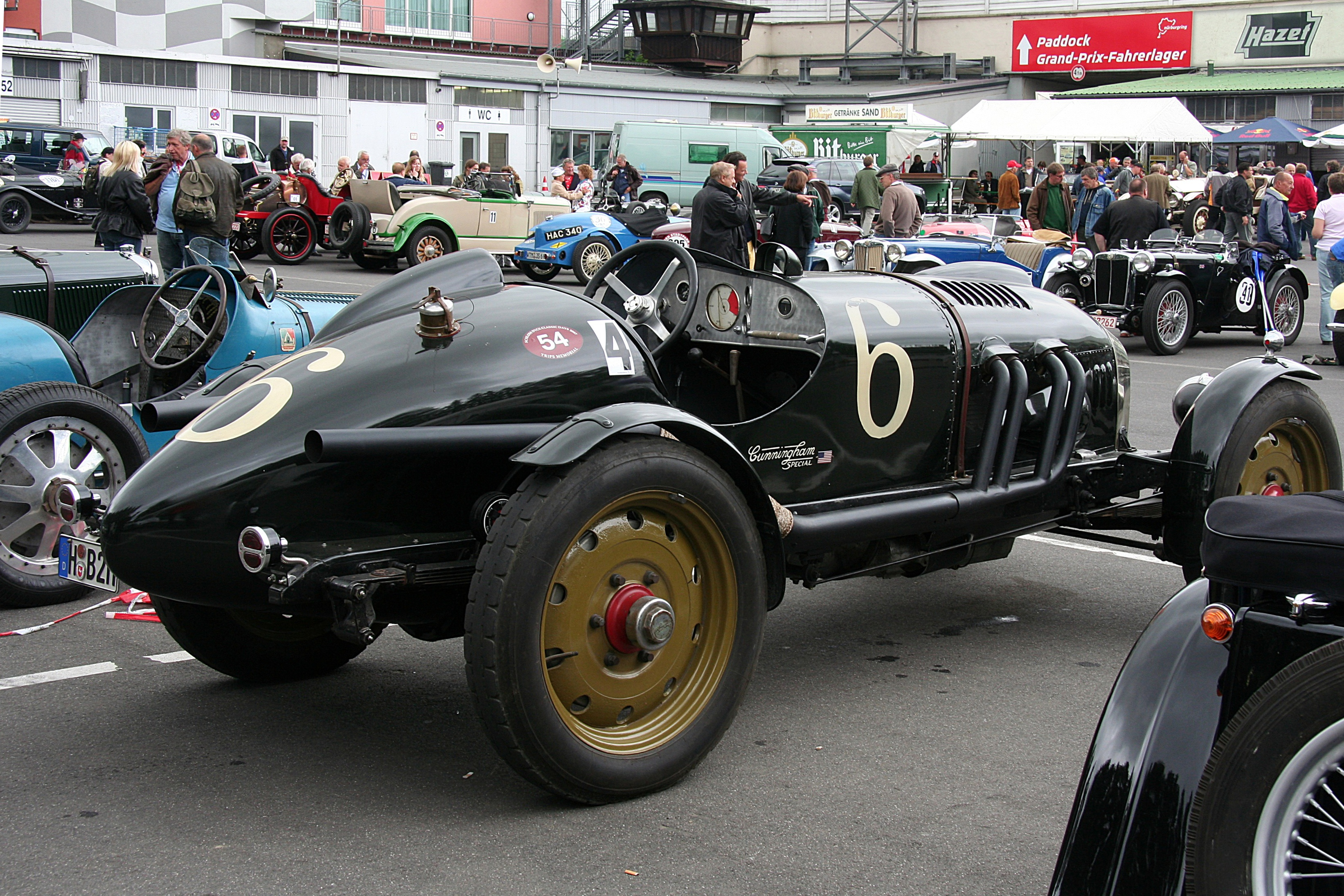
2008 at the Oldtimer Festival (Vintage Car Festival) of DAMC 05 at the historic Nürburgring riders' enclosure.

In 1970 some of the club's younger began to organise meetings under the authority of the German motor-sports body ONS, beginning with an auto slalom event in the car park of the Rhein Stadium. After several of those events, the first hill climb on the Southern Loop of the Nürburgring was organised on 5 September 1976, together with the clubs PSV Düsseldorf and MSC Jan Wellem. In 1977, the DAMC 05 held the first Jan Wellem Bergpreis for which it was solely responsible at the Ring.

During the reconstruction of the GP-circuit in 1983, the first Oldtimer Festival took place on the Northern Loop of the Nürburgring, where not only cars, but also motorcycles and sidecars participated. Since 1984 this event is hosted over three days on the new circuit and is attended by about 800 competitors from 14 nations.

Not only at the Nürburgring but also on public roads the club gained organisational success. On the occasion of the Bundesgartenschau (National Garden Show) in 1987 in Düsseldorf, the BUGA-Rallye for historic vehicles from Düsseldorf to the Oldtimer Festival took place. An anniversary race was held to celebrate Düsseldorf's 700th anniversary in 1988.

In 2008, the DAMC 05 organised the 26th Internationales Oldtimer Festival um den Jan-Wellem-Pokal (26th International Vintage Car Festival for the Jan Wellem Cup) for historic cars, motorcycles and sidecars at the Nürburgring.

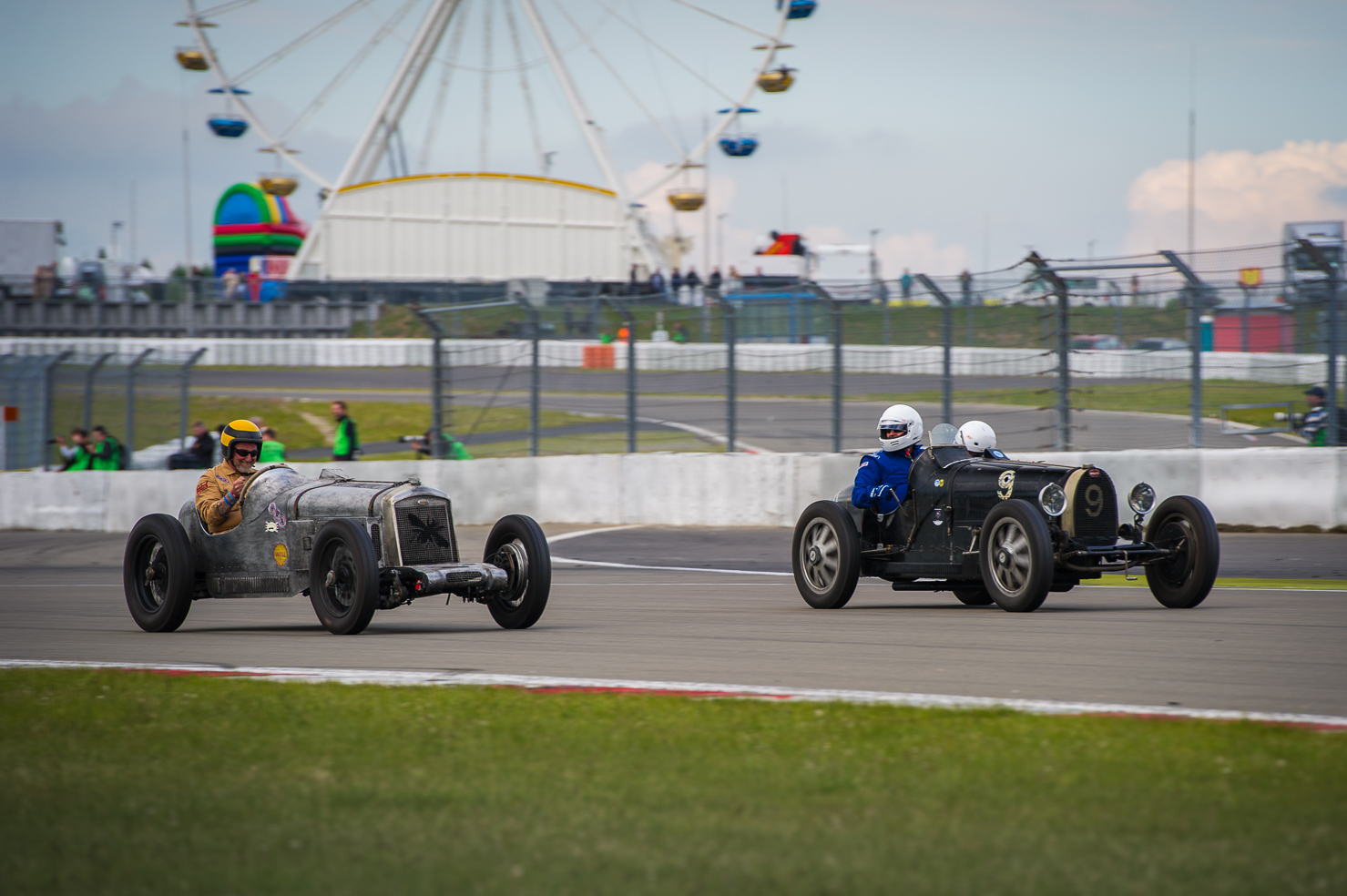
Nürburgring Classic 2019

In June 2017, on the occasion of the 90 anniversary of the Nürburgring, the club hosted a special anniversary edition of the Nürburgring Classic.

== New organization ==
In November 2017, the club transferred the organization of the event Nürburgring Classic to the DAMC 05 Veranstaltungs-GmbH.

== Division SimRacing ==
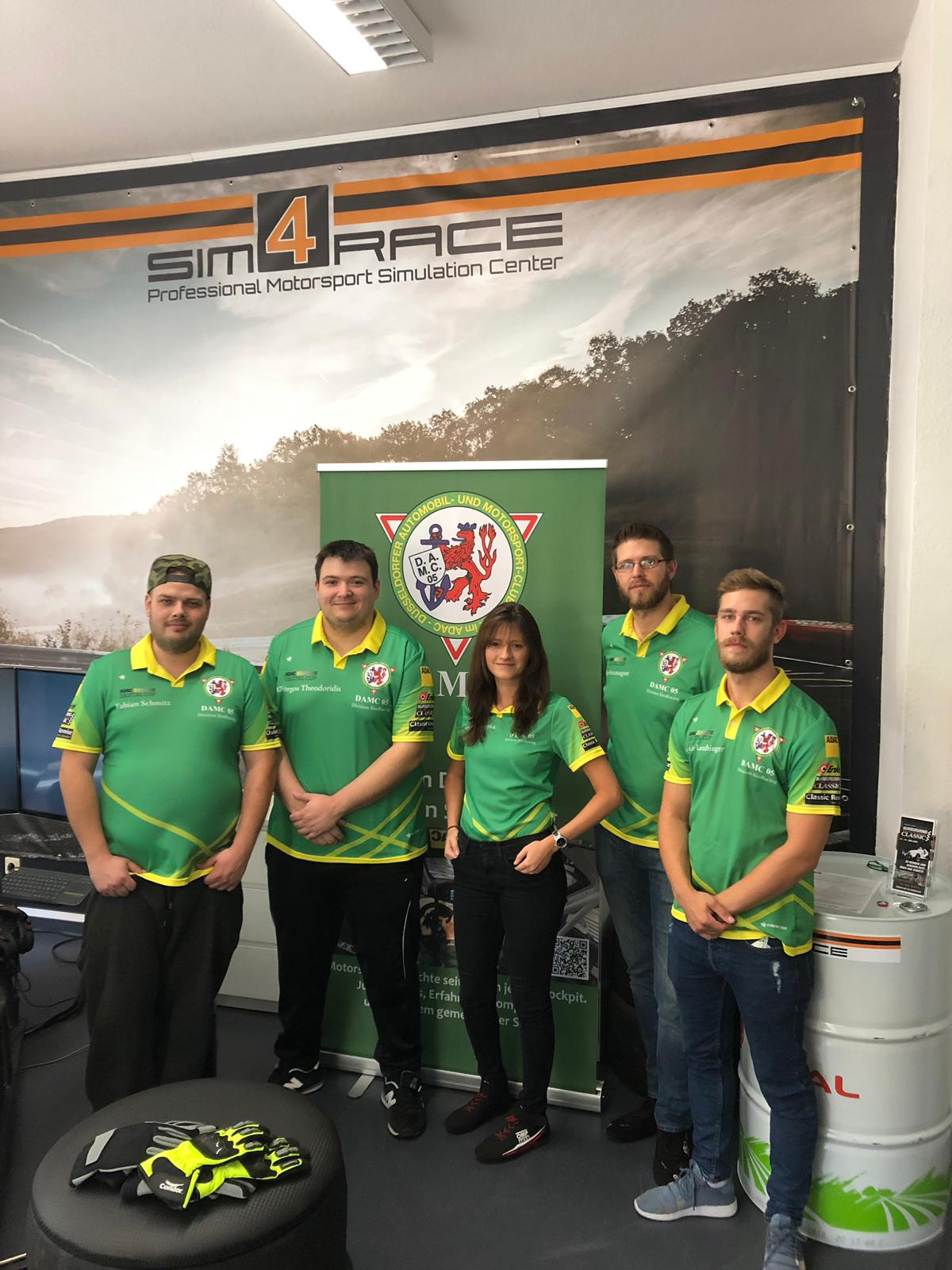
Team season summer 2019

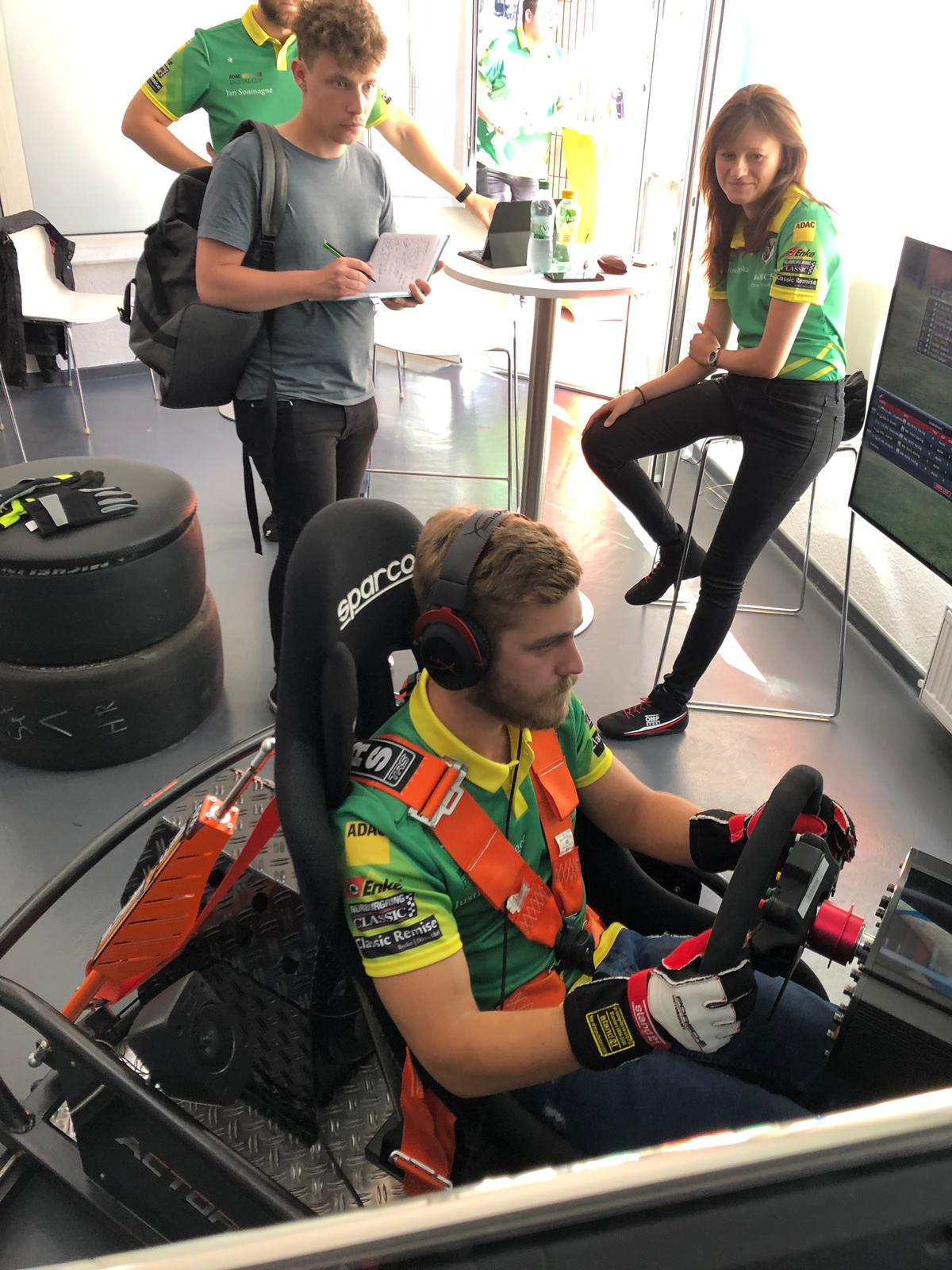
3rd race ADAC Digital cup, in a sim racing center

In fall 2018, the club founded an esports division, offering an additional opportunity outside of the race track. The club focuses on integrating the real motorsport and local community to avoid the distance of virtual sim racing teams.

The team from Düsseldorf started since 2019 in the ADAC Digital Cup.

== Club emblem ==
The club emblem has always featured the Bergisch lion along with an anchor — a symbol typical of Düsseldorf — and a shield bearing the club’s initials. In the 1930s, like many other clubs, DAMC 05 evolved into a regional automobile club. During this period, the logo was expanded to include shapes resembling traffic signs. Starting in the 1970s, the emblem was heavily modeled after the official Düsseldorf city coat of arms. Since 2025, the club has been using a reinterpretation of the logo, which is over 100 years old.

Club emblem 1905

Club emblem used 1930s–1970s

Club emblem since 1970s–2025

Redesigned club emblem 2025
