= Klaus Bechler =

- Born: Klaus Bechler; 1942 (age 83–84)
- Occupation: helicopter engineer

Klaus Bechler (29 October 1942 – 16 July 2023) was a former German helicopter engineer of the West German Border Guard (Bundesgrenzschutz) who volunteered to transport eight Black September terrorists and their nine Israeli hostages from the Munich Olympic Village to Fürstenfeldbruck Air Base in what became known as the Munich Massacre. He is one of the few survivors of the event.

Bechler was based at Oberschleißheim at the Fliegerstaffel Süd. On 4 September, Bechler had been in the Olympic stadium and saw the German high jumper, Ulrike Meyfarth, win gold.

== Munich Massacre ==
Bechler's first realisation of the events of 5 September was when he was awoken at 6:30 that morning and informed that his scheduled day off was cancelled. Having watched the hostage crisis unfold live on television, at 18:00 Bechler was ordered along with several other helicopters to fly to Munich in the direction of the city center. He landed at the Wehrbereichskommando 6, an emergency landing pad of the Bundeswehr where he learned from his superiors that it was possible that the terrorists and the hostages would be flown out of the Olympic Village. According to Bechler, Hans Dietrich Genscher stated that the mission to transport the terrorists and their hostages was a voluntary one and that he could not order anyone to go. Both of the two man German aircrews of each helicopter were instructed to be friendly and under no circumstances to provoke the terrorists. They were also instructed to keep their white helmets on constantly. According to Gunnar Ebel the pilot of the second helicopter, he and Reinhard Praius, the pilot of Bechler's helicopter, were ordered to fly in a large circle to give enough time for the "Krisenstab" crisis committee, Hans Dietrich Genscher, Manfred Schreiber, Hans Jochen Vogel and Franz Josef Strauss, also travelling by helicopter, to arrive at Furstenfeldbruck ahead of the terrorists and their Israeli hostages.

== Transportation to Fürstenfeldbruck ==
Before they left the Olympic Village, the terrorist leader Issa (Luttif Afif) went over to the helicopter and with a torch, thoroughly inspected the two Bell UH-1 Iroquois helicopters to transport the eight Black September terrorists and their nine hostages, even climbing on the roof to check there were no traps. Bechler showed the terrorist leader the machine and recalled the terrorist leader appeared 'very nervous but in control of the situation'. It was immediately clear to Bechler that Issa and Tony (Yusuf Nazzal) were the officers. Bechler's helicopter was piloted by Lieutenant Reinhard Praus and carried four of the nine Israeli hostages including David Berger, Ze'ev Friedman, Eliezer Halfin and Yakov Springer. They were accompanied by Tony and three other terrorists. Bechler remembered two of the Israeli hostages vividly, David Berger, an Israeli weightlifter, and wrestling coach Yakov Springer, described by Bechler, as "an elderly man with thinning hair". Bechler states that Issa asked the Israeli hostages, in his, Bechlers helicopter, if any of them spoke German, Bechler recalled Springer replying that he did.

A terrorist stood behind Bechler and another holding a hand grenade and Kalashnikov stood behind the pilot Reinhard Praus. As they were in the air Bechler states that the terrorist put the hand grenade away and placed the Kalashnikov on Bechler's shoulder.

== Fürstenfeldbruck ==
On arriving at Fürstenfeldbruck, 'Tony' got out of Bechler's helicopter and Issa out of the other. Together, they went to the Lufthansa, parked on the tarmac, one hundred meters away. As Bechler steps out of the helicopter and opens the left sliding door, a hooded terrorist places a submachine gun on Bechler's chest. Bechler recalls making eye contact with the Israelis whom Bechler believed "were apathetic" and "knew about their fate". Through the glass dome at the front of the helicopter, a hooded terrorist points his weapon at Praus and Bechler. As the German aircrew stepped onto the tarmac to walk away from their respective helicopter and as they had been instructed to do by the Krisenstab, the terrorists raise their rifles towards the crew, although no words were exchanged despite an assurance from Issa to the Krisenstab that the four German aircrew of the two helicopters would not come to any harm.

As Issa and Tony made their way back to the helicopters, the first shots were fired. One terrorist who had been on Bechler's helicopter "did not move anymore", a second terrorist shot until the magazine on his rifle was empty. Tony was hit in the thigh about twenty five meters away from Bechler who took cover under the helicopter. Issa, who was not hit, threw himself under Bechler's helicopter. During a lull in the exchange of bullets between the terrorists and German police, Bechler ran towards the airbase control tower but as he did so was shot at from the other helicopter. Bechler dropped on the tarmac in front of the control tower and played dead for almost one and a half hours as the gun battle raged all around him.

I heard the first hand grenade explode, then I heard the people scream in the other helicopter, after that there was a terrible silence. Then there was total chaos..... Issa screamed in English and Arabic. I heard one more of the hostages screaming. Suddenly it was very warm, the tank was well burst and burning kerosene came towards me. Then I'm up and running. I had to walk maybe 90 meters, but it was shot at me. I was able to save myself behind a corner – and then Franz Josef Strauss came to me.

Bechler received superficial wounds to the hand and buttock.

Bechler states that his immediate concern was for his helicopter despite the human loss around him. "Shall I tell you what I thought when my machine burned? At 1.8 million marks worth. That's stupid. That's not normal. How can you think like that. People are dying and I think of the money!"

== Aftermath ==
Bechler did not receive any help from the German Government despite the trauma of the events that night. After being taken care of by military doctors in the military hospital, Bechler was taken back to Oberschleissheim the next morning to his squadron. The next day he returned to full active service.

"There was no help, nothing. I was depressed by all the incidents, I wanted to get rid of them, wanted to talk. But when I wanted to talk to colleagues about it, it was said very quickly: Are you starting with this shit again? At that time I was married in my first marriage. And I suspect that my wife went to the Jehovah's Witnesses because of the incidents in Munich. They did not want me to carry a gun anymore and stop working – the profession I loved so much. This is probably what broke our marriage."

At the end of 1981 Bechler was retired from flying duties suffering from sonic trauma and sudden deafness from Fürstenfeldbruck for which Bechler did not receive treatment. Bechler believed that if he had been wearing his flight helmet he would have lost his hearing permanently.

Bechler went to work in the security service of Lufthansa, including half a year in Delhi, then half a year in Lima.

Hans-Dietrich Genscher thanked Bechler personally and awarded the Federal Cross of Merit First Class which he does not wear but keeps in a presentation box. Bechler also keeps a cartridge case from Fürstenfeldbruck.
