= Mercedes-Benz Plant Bremen =

Coordinates: 53°03′55″N 8°54′32″E

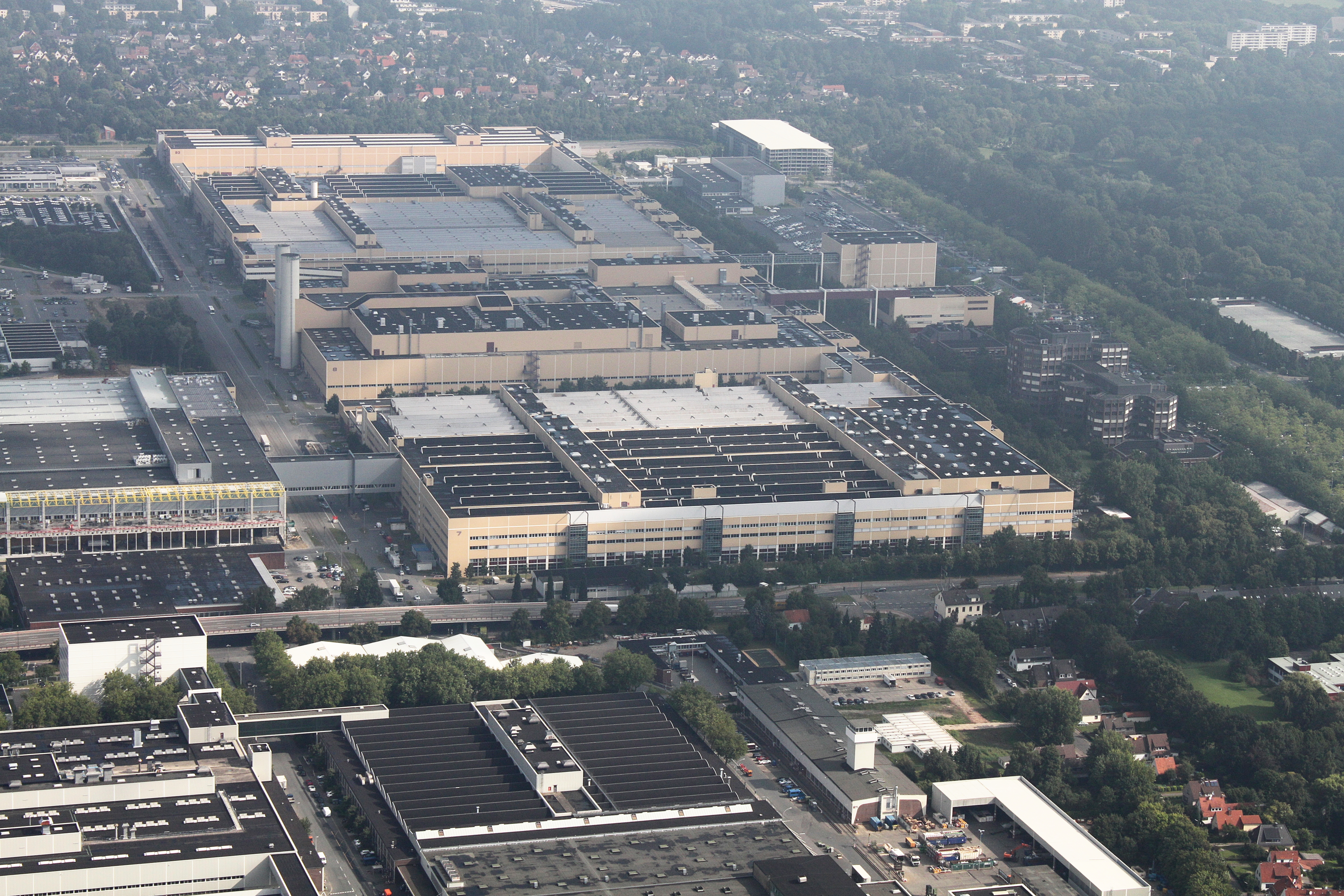
- Location: Bremen, Germany
- Products: automobiles
- Employees: 11,000
- Area: 1.5 million m²
- Owner: Mercedes-Benz Group
- Website: group.mercedes-benz.com/company/locations/production-network-bremen.html

Mercedes-Benz operates an automobile factory in Bremen, Germany. The history of the plant dates back to the former Borgward factory built in 1938. Formerly a commercial vehicle plant of Mercedes-Benz and Hanomag, for the past decades, this plant mainly produced the C-Class and SL-class, since joined by the electric EQC and EQE.

== History ==
Car production in Bremen dates back 1905 when the Hansa company opened a factory in nearby Varel. In 1938, a new plant was built at the current site in Sebaldsbrück district of Bremen by Hansa's parent company Borgward. Later, Lloyd vehicles would also be produced at the plant.

Under the Schell-plan, Borgward was forced to change its product range in 1939/1940. During World War II the company became a main supplier of half-track vehicles such as infantry fighting vehicles, tractors and load carriers. Torpedoes were also produced during this time. The plant in was destroyed for 58% in the air raid on Bremen on October 12, 1944. From 25 August 1944 until the heavy air raid in October 1944, the SS maintained a subcamp of the Neuengamme concentration camp, the Bremen-Sebaldsbrück concentration camp (Borgward), with about 1000 Polish and Russian men who had been transferred from the Auschwitz concentration camp to the new Sebaldsbrück plant. The prisoners were housed on the upper floors of an old factory building on the Borgward site in Sebaldsbrück and had to work in armaments and vehicle production.

After bankruptcy of Borgward, in 1961 Hanomag took over the plant for the construction of light trucks and construction machinery, and Hanomag-Henschel was created in 1969 through merger, initially only with a participation of Daimler-Benz. Daimler-Benz took full control of the plant in 1972. The Harburg Transporter was built at the plant from 1969, then its successor Mercedes-Benz T1.

In 1978, production of Mercedes-Benz passenger vehicles started, the first being the Mercedes-Benz W123 estate. In the 1980s the plant was significantly expanded, including a two-level factory floor in order to save space. Production of Mercedes-Benz's compact executive car, the W201 and its successor, the C-Class, has continued in Bremen since 1983.

In June 2024 the factory celebrated its 10 millionth vehicle produced. As of 2024, circa 11,000 people are employed at the plant. The annual production amounted to 324,000 vehicles. The plant ranked second (behind Beijing Benz) in production output of all Mercedes-Benz plants.

== Production ==
=== Current ===
Image	Model	Years
	Mercedes-Benz C-Class	1993–
	Mercedes-Benz GLC (Mercedes-Benz GLK-Class)	2008–
	Mercedes-Benz CLE	2023–
	Mercedes-AMG SL Roadster	2022–
	Mercedes-Maybach SL	2024–
	Mercedes-Benz EQE	2022–
	Mercedes-AMG GT	

=== Historical ===
Image	Model	Years
	Sd.Kfz. 11	1938–1944
	Borgward B 3000	1941–1944 1948–1950
	Borgward Hansa 1500	1949–1954
	Lloyd 300	1950–1952
	Borgward Hansa 2400	1952–1955
	Borgward Isabella	1954–1961
	Borgward P 100	1959–1962
	Hanomag Kurier, Garant, Markant	
	Hanomag F-series	1967–
	Harburg Transporter	
	Mercedes-Benz T1	–1978
	Mercedes-Benz W123 estate	1978
	Mercedes-Benz W201	1983–1993
	Mercedes-Benz SL-Class (R129)	1988-2001
	Mercedes-Benz CLK-Class (C209)	2001-2008
	Mercedes-Benz SLK-Class	2003-2011
	Mercedes-Benz EQC	2019–2023
