= Peter Kurze =

German writer (born 1955)

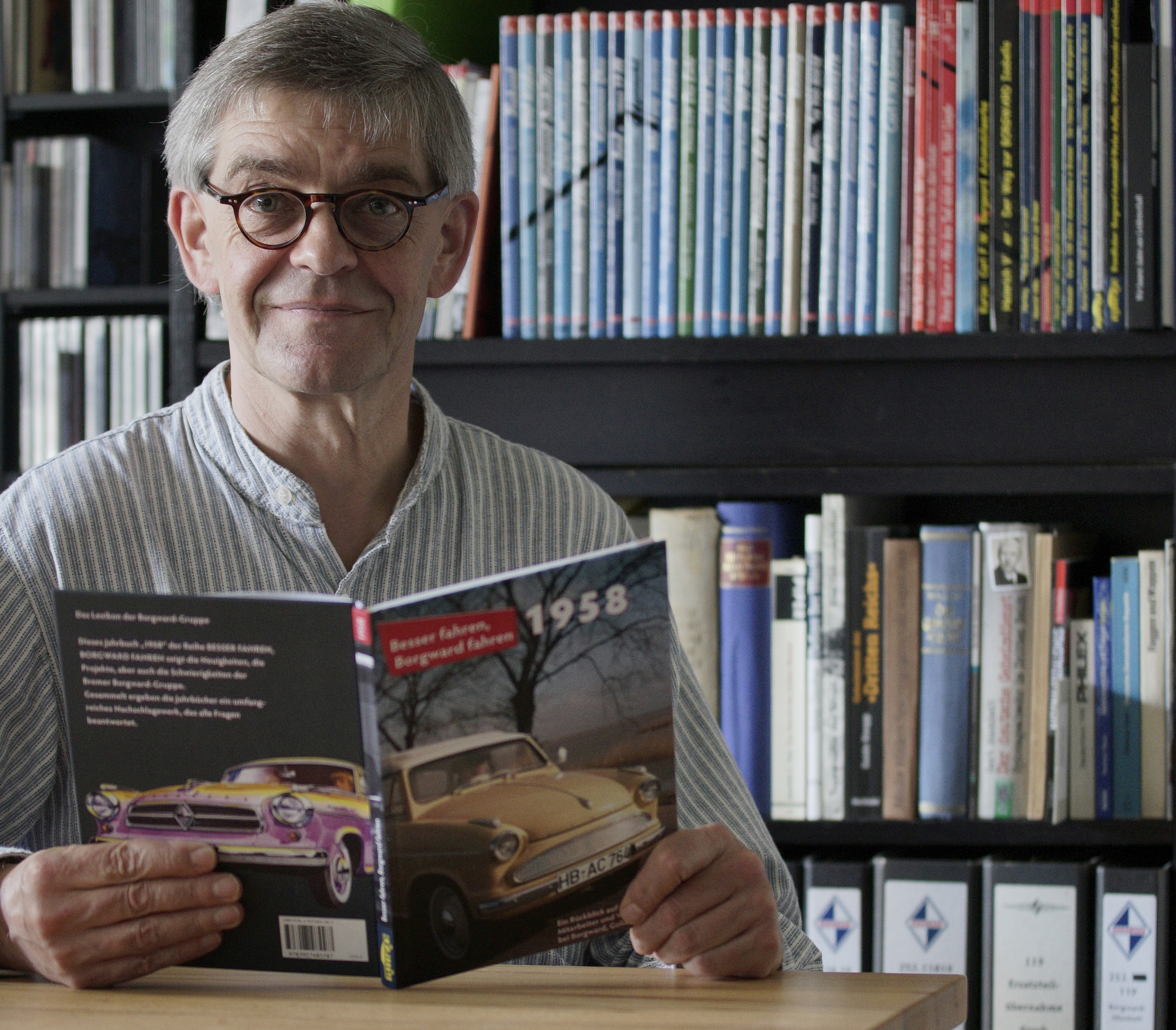
- Kurze in 2014
- Born: 1955 (age 70–71); Bremen, Germany
- Occupations: Publisher and author
- Website: http://www.peterkurze.de/

Peter Kurze is a German publisher and author. He became known through his book series on the history of the automobile.

== Life ==
Born 1955 in Bremen, after two one-year internships at a machine factory and a bank, he studied mechanical engineering and later business administration with a focus on marketing and corporate history. In 1980 he started his own business with a company for vintage car spare parts and literature. In 1987, Short wrote his first book. It was about the VW-Kübelwagen type 181 bucket. At the end of the 80s he was one of the founders of the GummikuH motorcycling magazine.

In 1995, the Bremen acquired the image archive, consisting of positives, negatives and rights of use, the photographer Gerhard Schammelt, mainly Lloyd-, Mercedes-Benz- and Volkswagen vehicles mapped. This base of nearly 12,000 images has been expanded by the purchase of other archives. Thus, Kurze was able to get the discounts and rights of the photographers Paul Botzenhardt (German and French automobiles), Rudolf Dodenhoff (various brands), Heinz Lutz (GDR vehicles), Walter Richleske (Borgward), Hans Saebens (various brands), Karl-Heinz Witte (Lloyd and Goliath) and Hermann Ohlsen (Architecture Bremen) acquire. Today, his picture archive contains around 150,000 photos of automobiles from the 1950s and 1960s as well as the aerospace industry (Henrich Fockes Focke-Wulf company) in Bremen of the 20s and 30s.

Brief published between 1996 and 2013, the book series "Cars from Bremen" (13 volumes), the history of the Bremen motor vehicle industry (Borgward, Hanomag, Mercedes-Benz). in the Delius Klasing Verlag he released the series "Moving Times", which presents various automobiles of the 50s. Short is currently working on a 14-volume Borgward chronicle in his specialty. Kurze is a member of the "F-Kubik" forum for vehicle history.

== Works (selection) ==
=== As author ===
==== Bremen automotive industry ====
- Besser fahren, Borgward fahren – Band 1959. Verlag Peter Kurze, Bremen 2010, ISBN 978-3-927485-54-9.
- Besser fahren, Borgward fahren – Band 1958. Verlag Peter Kurze, Bremen 2014, ISBN 978-3-927485-58-7.
- Besser fahren, Borgward fahren – Band 1957. Verlag Peter Kurze, Bremen 2016, ISBN 978-3-927485-57-0.
- Besser fahren, Borgward fahren – Band 1956. Verlag Peter Kurze, Bremen 2018, ISBN 978-3-927485-56-3.
- Borgward Typenkunde. Goliath und Lloyd. Delius Klasing Verlag, Bielefeld 2009, ISBN 978-3-7688-2599-3.
- Auf Borgwards Spuren in Hastedt. Verlag Peter Kurze, Bremen 2012, ISBN 978-3-927485-81-5.
- Carl F. W. Borgward Automobilwerke. Verlag Peter Kurze, Bremen 2001, ISBN 3-927485-23-3.
- Genau genommen: Borgward P100. Verlag Peter Kurze, Bremen 2012, ISBN 978-3-927485-71-6.
- Prototypen und Kleinserienfahrzeuge der Borgward-, Goliath- und Lloyd-Werke. Verlag Peter Kurze, Bremen 2008, ISBN 978-3-927485-53-2.
- Spurensuche: Autoindustrie Bremen. Verlag Peter Kurze, Bremen 2000, ISBN 3-927485-26-8.
- Kurze/Schwerdtfeger: Autoland Bremen. Verlag Peter Kurze, Bremen 2009, ISBN 978-3-927485-04-4.
- Kurze/Neumann: 100 Jahre Automobilbau in Bremen: Die Hansa-Loyd- und Borgward-Ära. Verlag Peter Kurze, Bremen 2006, ISBN 3-927485-51-9.
- Kurze/Zwiener: 100 Jahre Automobilbau in Bremen: Die Hanomag- und Mercedes-Benz-Ära. Verlag Peter Kurze, Bremen 2007, ISBN 978-3-927485-52-5.
- Kurze/Kaack/Schwerdtfeger: Wir bauen Autos aus Leidenschaft · 75 Jahre Werk Bremen. Verlag Peter Kurze, Hgb. Daimler AG, Bremen 2014, ISBN 978-3-927485-70-9.

==== other producers ====
- DKW-Meisterklasse. Delius Klasing Verlag, Bielefeld 2005, ISBN 3-7688-1646-X.
- Ford Taunus 17 M. Delius Klasing Verlag, Bielefeld 2007, ISBN 978-3-7688-1924-4.
- Kleinwagen der Fünfzigerjahre. Delius Klasing Verlag, Bielefeld 2008, ISBN 978-3-7688-2511-5.
- Mercedes-Benz 190-300 SE. Delius Klasing Verlag, Bielefeld 2006, ISBN 3-7688-1810-1.
- Kurze/Halwart Schrader: Mercedes-Benz/8 W 114/115. Delius Klasing Verlag, Bielefeld 2012, ISBN 978-3-7688-3510-7.
- Kurze/Halwart Schrader: Mercedes-Benz 180/190/219/220a. Delius Klasing Verlag, Bielefeld 2012, ISBN 978-3-7688-3864-1.
- Trabant. Delius Klasing Verlag, Bielefeld 2003, ISBN 3-7688-1476-9.
- Kurze/Halwart Schrader: VW-Bulli. Delius Klasing Verlag, Bielefeld 2010, ISBN 978-3-7688-3227-4.
- VW-Käfer. Delius Klasing Verlag, Bielefeld 2003, ISBN 3-7688-1477-7.
- Wartburg 311/312. Delius Klasing Verlag, Bielefeld 2008, ISBN 978-3-7688-2455-2.

==== Varia ====
- Kurze/Stünkel/Ziesemer: Die Geschichte der Luftfahrt in Bremen. Bogenschütz-Verlag, Bremen 1996, ISBN 3-927485-03-9.
- Kaack/Kurze: Flugzeuge aus Bremen – Luftfahrtgeschichte der Hansestadt. Sutton, Erfurt 2015, ISBN 978-3-95400-472-0.
- Kaack/Kurze: Industrie in Bremen. Wartberg-Verlag, Gudensberg-Gleichen 2011, ISBN 978-3-8313-2322-7.
- Kurze/Steiner: Motorräder aus Zschopau – DKW, IFA, MZ. Delius Klasing Verlag, Bielefeld 1999, ISBN 3-89595-146-3.

==== YouTube ====
- Borgward 1956

=== As a publisherer ===
==== Bremen automotive industry ====
- Heinrich Völker: Der Weg zur Borgward Isabella. ISBN 978-3-927485-27-3.
- Engelbert Hartwig: Musste Isabella sterben? ISBN 978-3-927485-29-7.
- Harald Focke: Borgwards Hubschrauber. ISBN 978-3-927485-84-6.
- Gunther Riedel: Goliath Sport. ISBN 978-3-927485-75-4.
- Klaus Brandhuber: Borgward Automobil-Werke: Aufbau, Wirtschaftswunder und Konkurs. ISBN 978-3-927485-73-0.
- Heinrich Völker: Silberpfeile aus Bremen. ISBN 978-3-927485-43-3.
- Detlef Lichtenstein: Pietro Frua und seine Autos. ISBN 978-3-927485-31-0.
- Ulrich Knaack: Renault 5. 2006, ISBN 3-927485-48-9.
- Wolfgang Simons: Das Umweltauto. ISBN 978-3-927485-15-0.
- Peter Witt: Autos und Motorräder zwischen Eisenach und Moskau. ISBN 978-3-927485-18-1.
- Wolfgang Schröder: AWO, MZ, Trabant und Wartburg. ISBN 978-3-927485-12-9.
- Jörn Fröhlich: AWO, Simson und EMW. ISBN 978-3-927485-25-9.

==== Varia ====
- Henrich Focke: Mein Lebensweg. 1996, ISBN 3-931148-91-2.
- Schwärzel/Lehmann: Firmenmuseen in Deutschland. ISBN 978-3-927485-12-9.
- Hartmut Schwerdtfeger/Erik Herlyn: Die Handels-U-Boote „Deutschland“ und „Bremen“. ISBN 978-3-931148-99-7.
- Sven Claußen/Ulf Kaack: Die Seenotkreuzer der DGzRS (Reihe). ISBN 978-3-927485-90-7.
- Enno Hansing: Hier liegen meine Gebeine, ich wollt' es wären Deine. ISBN 978-3-927485-11-2.
