= Borgward BE3000 =

German truck

Overview
- Manufacturer: Borgward, Hansa-Lloyd and Goliath-Werke
- Also called: Lloyd EL3000
- Production: Hansa-Lloyd, Bremen, Germany
- Model years: 1945-1950 or 1954

Body and chassis
- Class: 7.5 metric tons (7.38 long tons) mid-class truck
- Layout: RR layout

Powertrain
- Engine: 10.3 kW, 160 volts electric motor
- Transmission: none

Dimensions
- Wheelbase: 138 in (3,500 mm)
- Curb weight: 9,811–16,424 lb (4,450–7,450 kg)

Chronology
- Predecessor: Borgward EL3
- Successor: none

The Borgward BE3000, later sold as Lloyd EL3000, was the electric drive version of the German military truck Borgward B 3000, a 6,600 lb or 3,000 kg mid-class truck.

NAMAG and Borgward had been developing electric vehicles up to 40 PS since 1906. In 1950, Borgward moved the production from Bremen to their other location in Hastedt, a district of Bremen-Hemelingen, and renamed the vehicle to Lloyd EL3000. The total production figure is not known, but about 30 vehicles of this type were built each year. The major customer was the British Army of the Rhine.

The truck had a range of 70 km (43 miles) loaded and 100 km (62 miles) unloaded. 7.50×20" tires were used. The turning radius was 13 m. In addition to the hydraulic brake, a motor shortcut circuit was installed to retard the vehicle electrically. The motor was manufactured by Lloyd Dynamowerke Bremen.

The later type EL3000 was an electric mail delivery vehicle, produced from parts of various manufacturers.
