= Borgward 1500 RS =

Motor vehicle

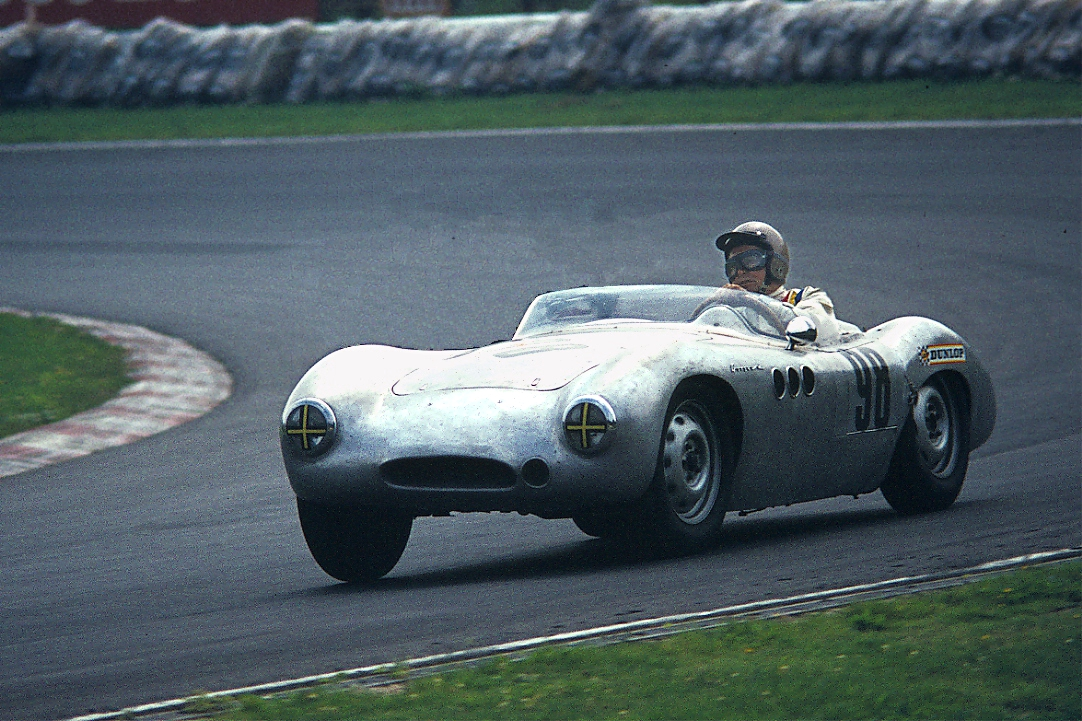
Borgward RS, 6th generation

The Borgward 1500 RS was a racing sports car in the class with up to 1.5 liters displacement, which the Carl F.W. Borgward G. mb H. Automobil- und Motoren-Werke presented at the International Motor Show in Frankfurt am Main in 1951. Until 1958, nine cars of this model were built and continuously developed. The Borgward RS was a somewhat successful car, but despite good performance of its modern fuel injected 4-valve DOHC engine used from 1954 onwards, the chassis was often inferior to the Porsche 550 and Porsche 718, which had better driving characteristics. Borgward stopped racing cars in 1958, supplied 1500cc engines to Formula 2 which became Formula 1 in 1961 when the whole company surprisingly went out of business.

== History ==
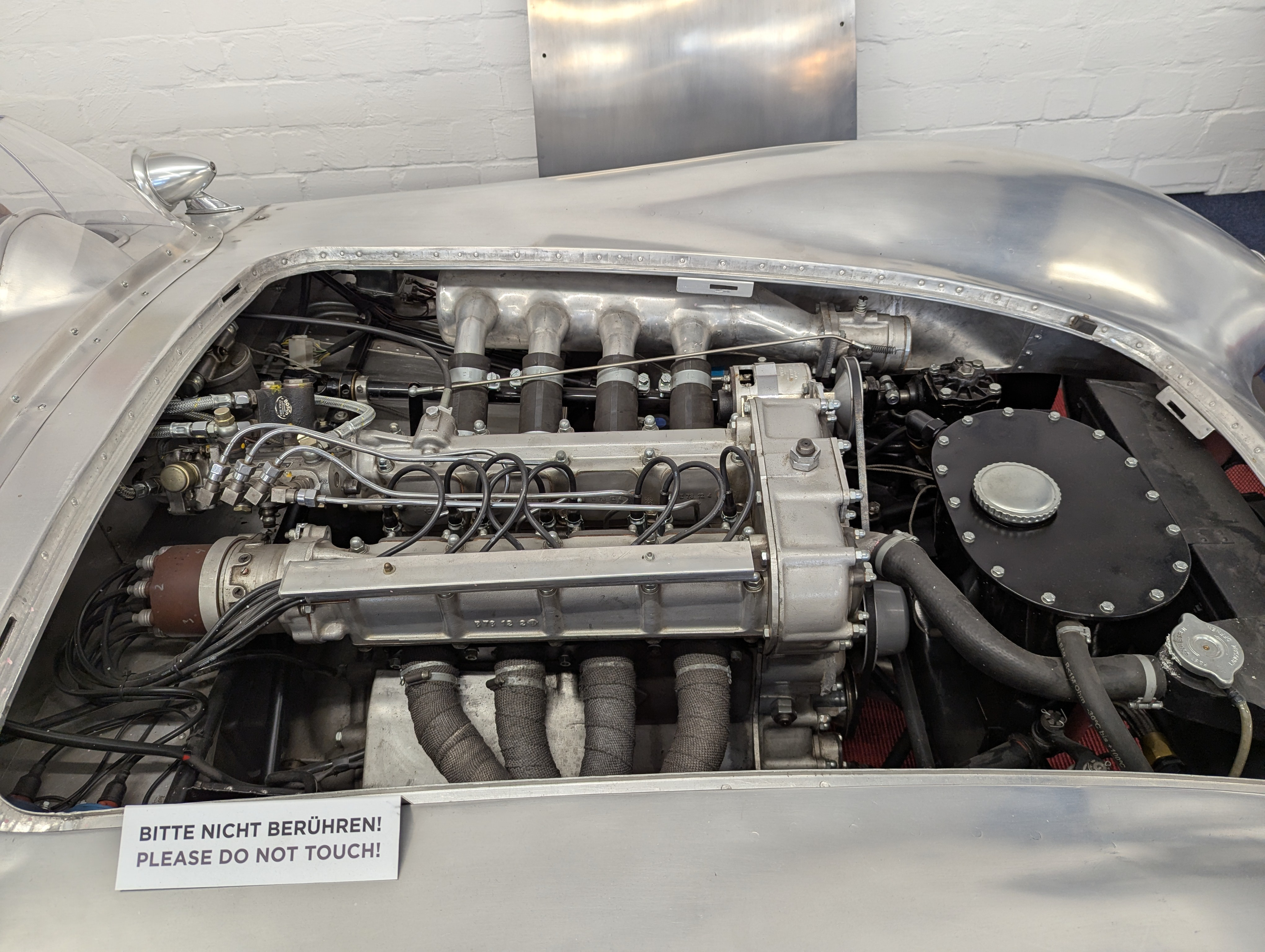
Borgward 1500 RS 4-cyl engine introduced in 1954 featured DOHC 4-valve with fuel injection, predating similar designs

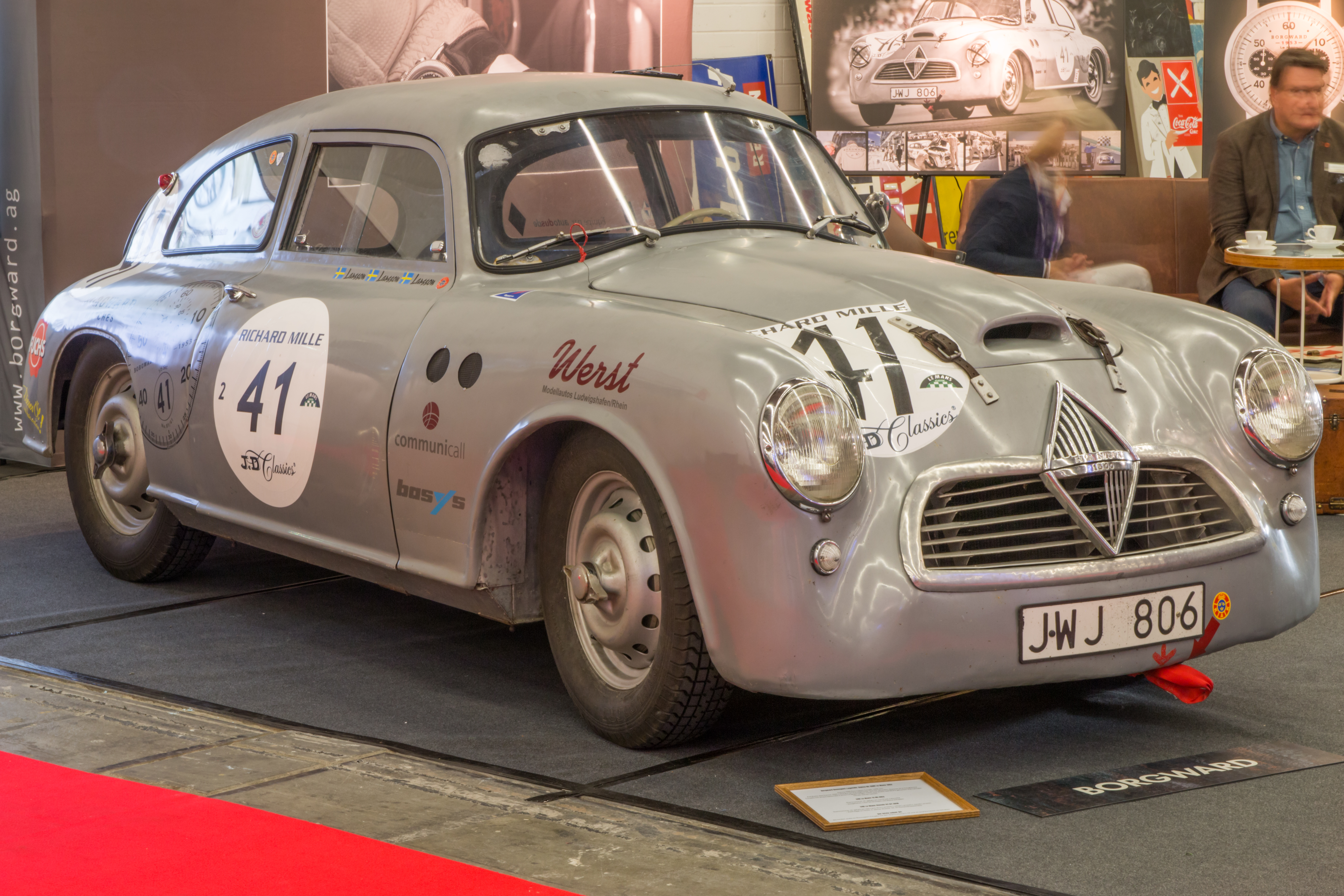
Borgward Hansa RS 1500

=== Records in Montlhéry ===
Twelve international records in the F class up to 1.5 liters with a car based on the Hansa 1500 on the Linas-Montlhéry circuit encouraged Borgward to participate in Formula 2 races if necessary. The top average speed of the record-breaking car with its streamlined aluminum body and 66 hp engine was 172 km/h over 1000 miles. The initiators were the former racing driver and Auto Union factory director of sports, engineer August Momberger, and engineer Martin Fleischer.

=== Victories on the Grenzlandring and on the AVUS ===
However, Borgward did not start in Formula 2, but with a two-seater racing car. Karl Ludwig Brandt had increased the output of the 1.5-liter engine to 80 hp. However, when it was used for the first time in the ADAC Eifel race on May 25, 1952, at the Nürburgring, Hans Hugo Hartmann damaged the car's rear and had to retire. Over the course of the year, the engine output increased to 90 hp and the first successes came, including victories by Hartmann at the Grenzlandring race and at the AVUS. Adolf Brudes, who was already 53, drove a second car, which set a course record for the class up to 1500 cm³ at 208.3 km/h on the Grenzlandring before retiring with engine failure.

=== Successes at the Nürburgring, bad luck at the Carrera Panamericana ===
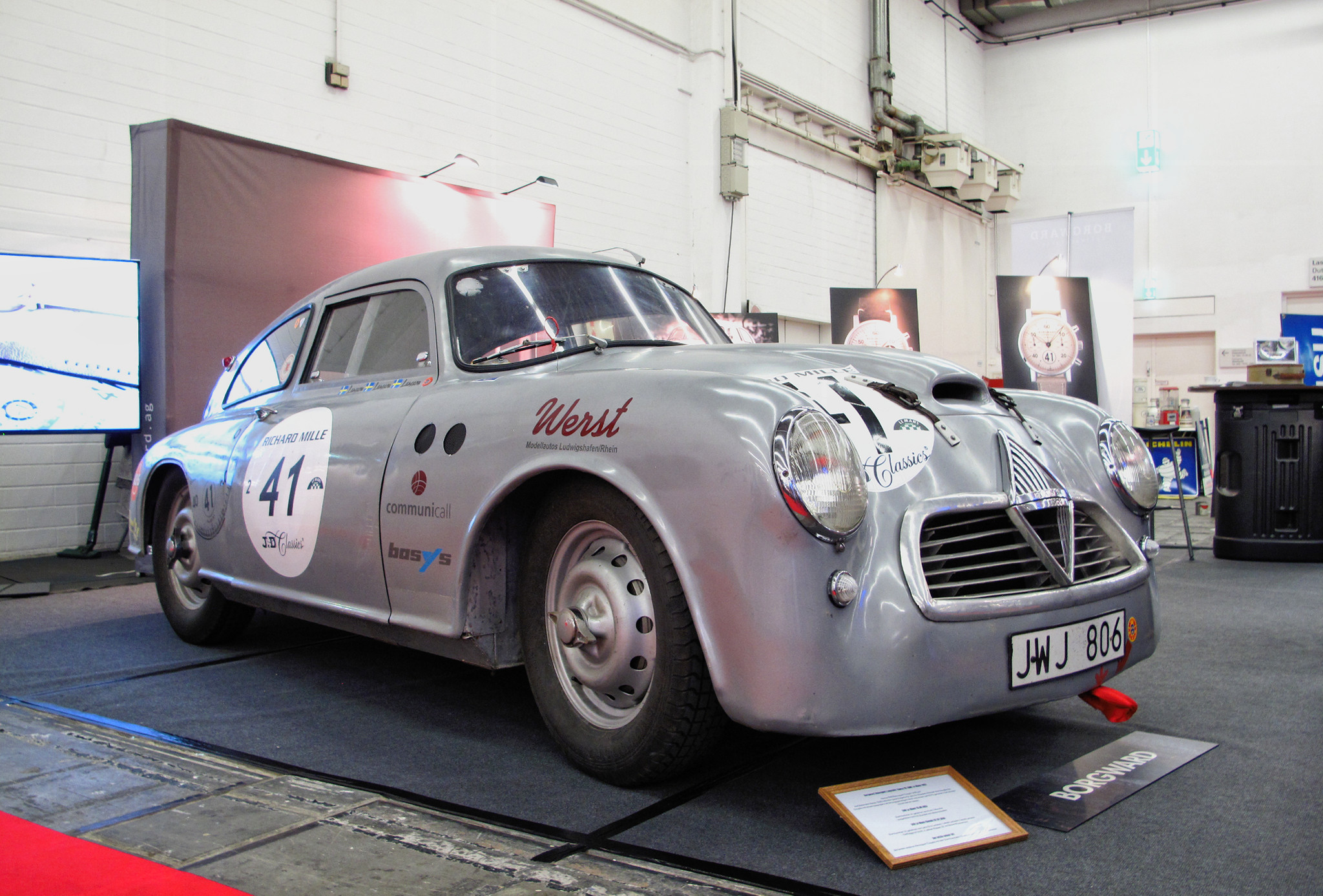
IAA Frankfurt 2019

At the Eifel race in May 1953, Brudes and Hartmann took second and third place in the sports car class up to 1500 cm³ with the car from the previous year. After six laps or 136.86 kilometers on the Nordschleife of the Nürburgring, Brudes was 3.6 seconds short of victory. A revised model with a 102 hp engine and a shortened wheelbase was ready in July. Hans Klenk thus won the AVUS race on July 12 ahead of Hans Herrmann in a Porsche. One of the best results of a Borgward RS was third place overall in the first 1000 km race at the Nürburgring in 1953, driven by Karl-Günther Bechem and Theo Helfrich, behind Alberto Ascari / Giuseppe Farina in a Ferrari 375 MM Vignale and Ian Stewart / Roy Salvadori in a Jaguar C-Type. 51 vehicles started this race, and 28 reached the finish. Borgward sent two cars to the 3000 km Carrera Panamericana Rally in Mexico in 1953. Brudes suffered a serious accident at the start of the event and Hartmann was disqualified shortly before the end for exceeding the three-hour time limit for the final stage by 7 seconds following a defect. Up until then, Hartmann had been leading his class by an hour and a half over a second.

=== New engine, but criticism of the chassis ===
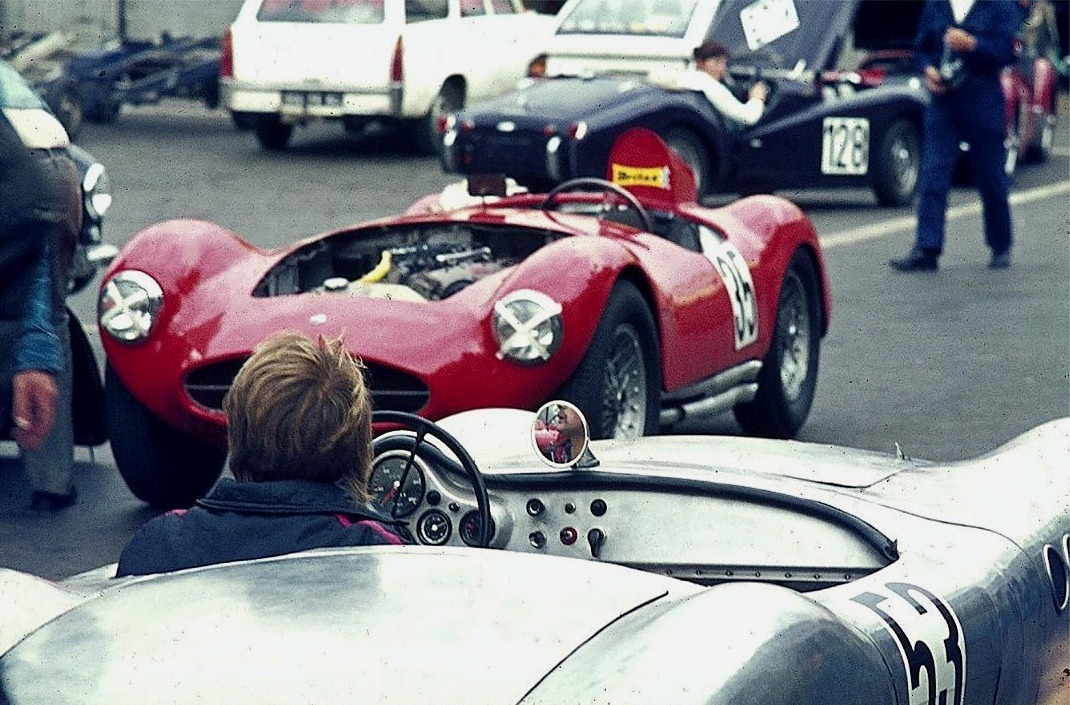
Borgward RS, year of construction 1956, (cockpit)

In 1954, Borgward started with three cars, two new builds, and one conversion from the previous year. The cars were lighter than their predecessors, but initially still had their twin carburetor engines. At the Eifel race on May 23, Bechem and Hartmann finished the race of the sports cars up to 1500 cm³ with a double victory; Brudes finished eighth. In the supporting program of the German Grand Prix, the Borgward RS drove for the first time with an injection engine. Bechem finished fifth behind four Porsche 550 Spyders; Hartmann had a serious accident and then gave up his career as a racing driver. Despite increasing criticism from drivers of the handling of the Borgward sports cars, two started for the 1954 Carrera Panamericana; both retired by accident.

After the Porsche 550 proved to be superior, Karl Ludwig Brandt designed a racing engine without using modified series parts. The engine had two overhead camshafts, four valves per cylinder, and direct fuel injection. During the first run on the test bench in early May 1956, it delivered 134 hp at 7000 rpm. On July 22, 1956, Helmut Schulze and Erwin Bauer started the Solitude race with the new engine and revised chassis. Schulze finished sixth despite a drop in engine performance and Bauer retired after going off the track. The cause of the accident may have been the driving behavior of the Borgward RS, which had already been criticized during test drives. Helmut Schulze later said, among other things: “The Borgward reacted much more sensitively at the limit than the competing vehicles I knew and which I also drove in the race. The transition from 'still sufficient grip' to the instability of the tires was extremely short, emotionally uncomfortable for the driver, and difficult to correct."

=== Racing break in 1956 ===
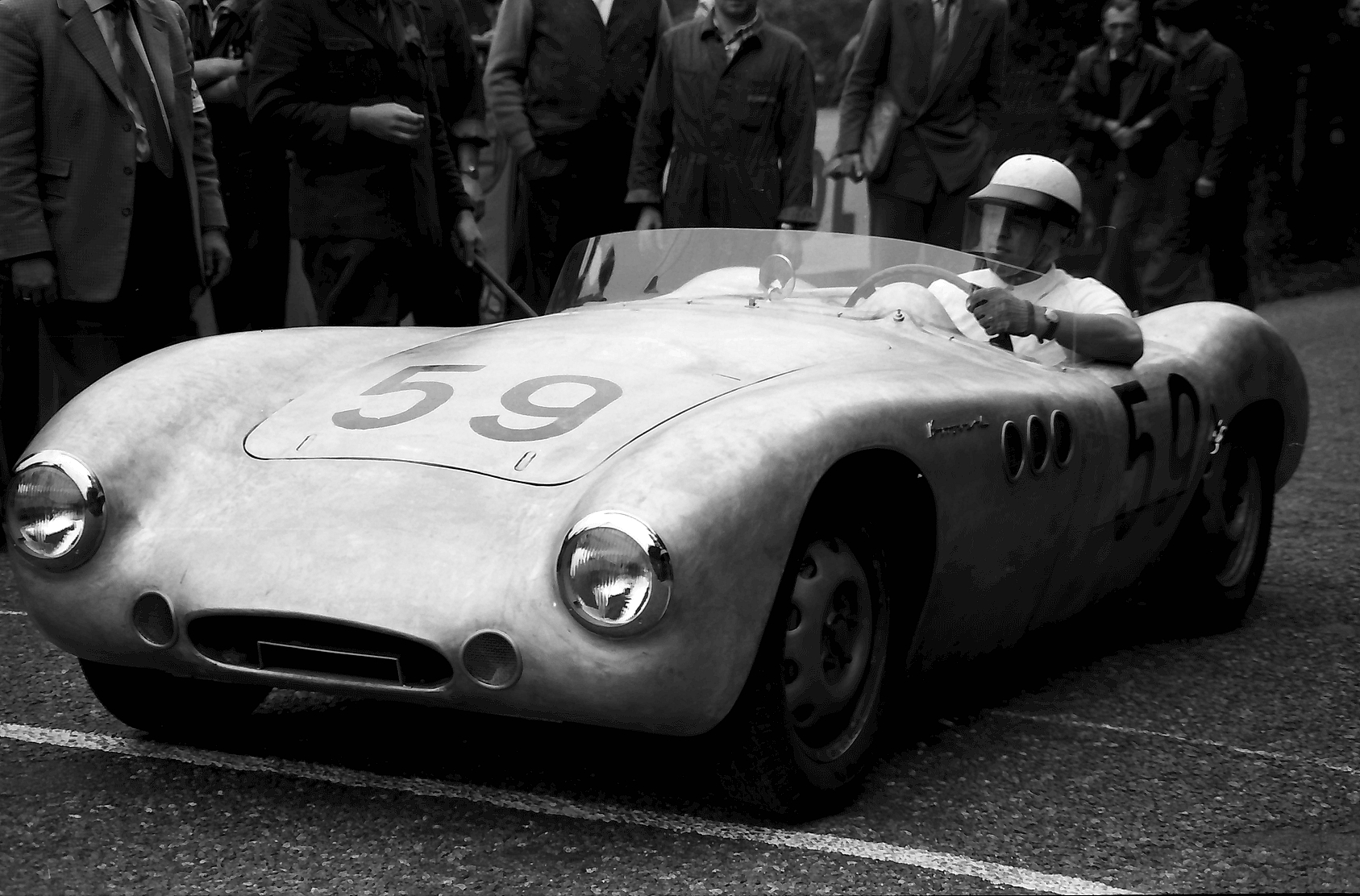
Helmut Schulze at Schauinsland on 27 July 1957

After the unsatisfactory result at the Solitude, Wilhelm Büchner, head of the testing department, withdrew the entry for the sports car race as part of the supporting program for the German Grand Prix on August 5, 1956, at the Nürburgring. To improve driving characteristics, the car received a torsion-resistant tubular space frame for the 1957 season. In addition, a locking differential should prevent the rear wheel on the inside of the curve from spinning.

=== Hillclimb championship with well-known drivers ===
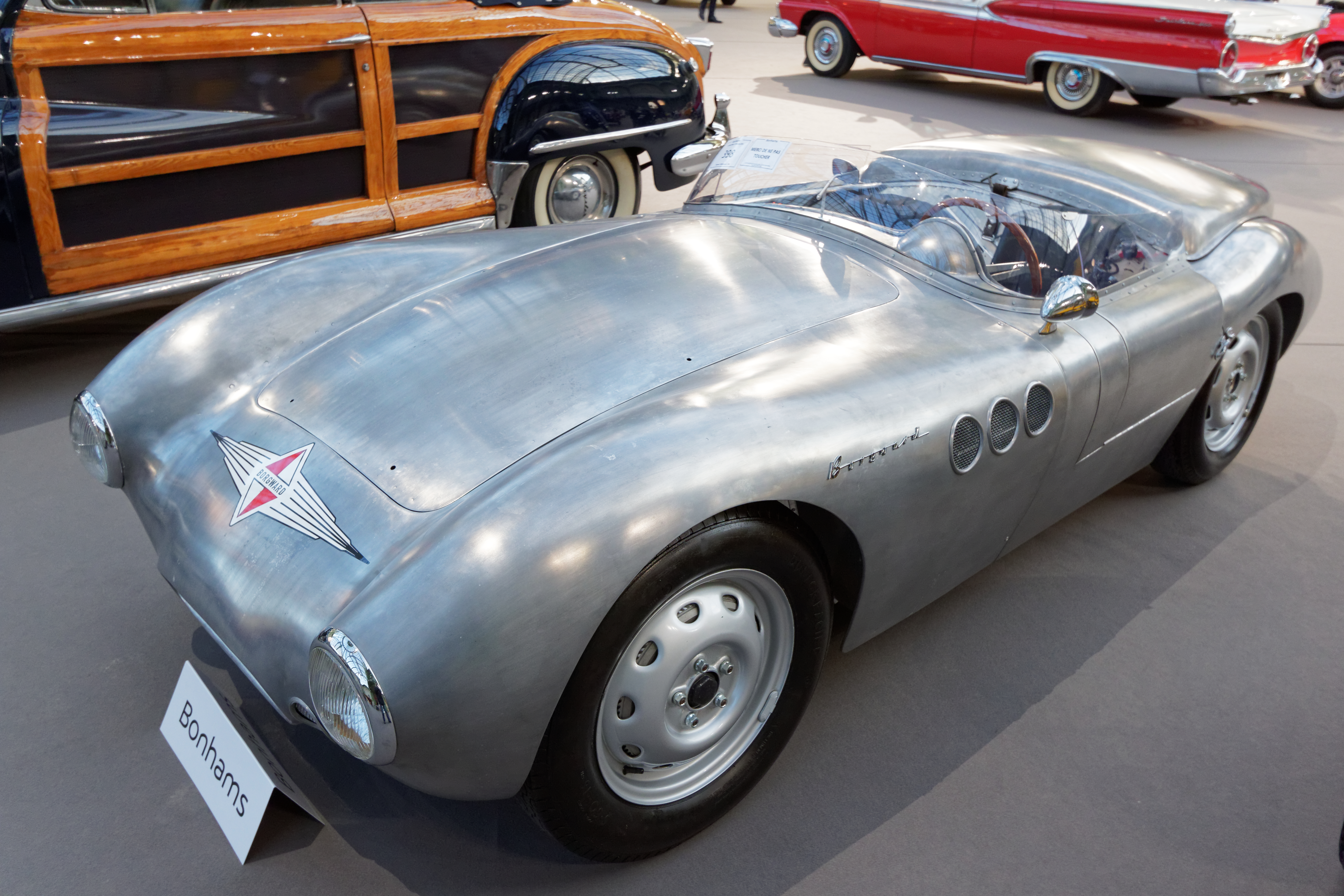
Un des véhicules présenté lors de la vente aux enchères Bonhams 2015 au Grand Palais de Paris.

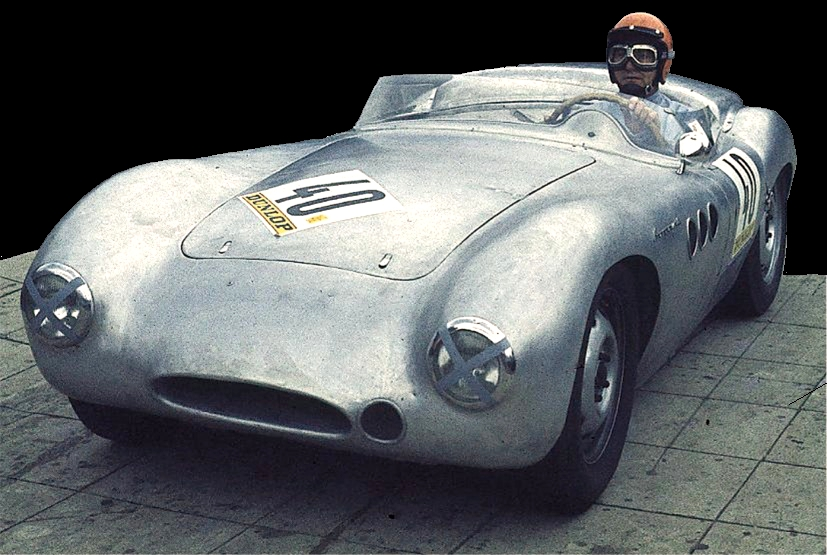
Borgward RS with rear attachment; Driver: Fritz Juttner

With the new vehicles, Borgward took part in particular in the European Hill Climb Championship, which was held again in 1957. Drivers were Hans Herrmann, Giulio Cabianca, Joakim Bonnier, Eberhard Mahle and Maurice Trintignant. Herrmann became Vice Mountain Champion.

A disadvantage of the Borgward RS from the beginning was the higher weight compared to the cars of the competition. Therefore, in 1958, one received a body made of Elektron, an alloy of magnesium and aluminum, instead of aluminum. This saved 25 kg. To improve the aerodynamics, there was a rear attachment ("backpack") developed by the aircraft designer Henrich Focke, which could be attached or removed as required, but was firmly integrated into the body of the Elektron car.

The 1958 season was relatively successful with two wins and second place for Joakim Bonnier and third place for Hans Herrmann in the Euro Hill Climb Championship, but Borgward Porsche was defeated in six hill climbs. The drivers continued to criticize the driving characteristics of the Borgward RS.

=== Borgward engine in Formula Two ===
At the end of 1958, Borgward withdrew from racing in view of only moderate success and because the costs were too high. However, the now powerful and stable engine was to be further developed with a view to future series engines and used in foreign Formula 2 cars. As early as October 1958, Stirling Moss the Borgward RS back in October 1958 and was impressed. In early 1959, a supply agreement was signed between Borgward and the British Racing Partnership (BRP), which fitted its Cooper T51 racing cars with Borgward engines. The head race fitter and Borgward test driver Fritz Jüttner took over the maintenance of the units. However, the engagement ended at the end of the same year. The engine now made 153-155 hp at 7300 rpm. Moss had won four Formula 2 races with the Borgward engine, Chris Bristow two.

== Design ==
The Borgward RS was the further development of the INKA car, of a Borgward Hansa 1500 modified to become a record-breaking vehicle. The engine was initially a variant of the four-cylinder in-line car engine with a camshaft lying below or on the side, a stroke of 92 mm, and a bore of 72 mm, a so-called long-stroke engine, but with two carburetors.

The chassis of the first RS consisted of a box frame with cross braces, independent wheel suspension on double wishbones at the front, and a De Dion axle at the rear.

=== Engines ===
The engine of the RS with a flanged transmission was installed behind the front axle, and the water cooler was in front of the front axle. With a displacement of 1498 cm³, after the original 80 or 90 hp from 1954 with direct injection, it delivered 113 to 115 hp at 6000 rpm and a compression ratio of 9.8:1.

The racing engine used from 1956 with a housing made of cast silumin (aluminum alloy) differed fundamentally from the versions derived from the production unit. Significant innovations were the changed bore-stroke ratio, valve control with two overhead camshafts, dual ignition, and dry sump lubrication. The stroke was 74 millimeters, the bore 80 millimeters; Displacement was 1488 cm³. The cylinders with “wet” cylinder liners had roof-shaped combustion chambers, each with two spark plugs, with the injection nozzle in between two of the four valves in each case on the slopes of the roof. The valves were controlled directly via those of two duplex chain-driven camshafts, on which the control times could be infinitely adjusted. The engine produced 134 hp at 7300 rpm and had a compression ratio of 10.5:1.

In conjunction with this DOHC engine, the Borgward RS had a five-speed gearbox with a center shift lever that was synchronized in gears two to five. From there, the torque was transmitted to the rear axle via a Cardan shaft to the differential (a limited-slip differential from 1957).

=== Undercarriage ===
The box frame of the first generations of the RS and the De Dion axle made the car relatively heavy compared to other racing sports cars of its time. At around 900 kg, the 1953 version was lighter than the first version but weighed around 350 kg more than a Porsche 550. In order to reduce the weight, the frame tubes were drilled through on one of the first cars (allegedly 2000 drill holes), However, this only resulted in a saving of 3.5 kilograms, but on the other hand, it worsened the torsional and bending stiffness of the frame, which was considered unsatisfactory anyway. From 1957 the chassis was fitted with a space frame.

The double wishbones were probably standard parts from the Borgward Hansa 1500, but with canted coil springs and integrated telescopic shock absorbers instead of the standard transverse leaf spring. From the fourth generation, built in 1955/56, the RS had the modified front axle of the Borgward Isabella with a hydraulic steering damper. The steering arms and tie rods were installed behind the axle carrier, unlike in the series, but the stabilizer was retained unchanged. A Ross steer took the place of the Gemmer steer.

The new fourth-generation front axle was accompanied by a shortening of the wheelbase from 2250 to 2200 millimeters, which the drivers hoped would result in higher cornering speeds.

The De Dion rear axle with a constant 2-degree negative wheel camber remained basically unchanged during the entire construction period. The support tube behind the differential, which was suspended on coil springs, was guided by a lateral pendulum strut and a V-shaped strut hinged in the middle of the frame. The telescopic shock absorbers were mounted separately next to the springs.

Like other series parts, the hydraulically operated brake system was probably taken over from the Hansa 1500/1800. There is no information about the size of the brake drums and the wheels, so the standard dimensions must be assumed. From the second generation in 1953, the system had two brake circuits, one acting on the front and one on the rear axle. The handbrake acted on the rear wheels with cables and was initially applied with a lever to the right of the gearbox, which reached into the footwell. Later it was a stick handbrake to the left of the driver under the dashboard.

=== Body ===
The body of the first Borgward RS was similar to the INKA record car with a large Borgward rhombus on the front. They had a long tail instead of the aerodynamically more favorable spoiler lip, based on the already outdated ideas of the "streamlined car". A huge air scoop in the middle of the bonnet was supposed to supply more air to the carburetors through dynamic pressure and increased air resistance. As early as 1953, the hatchback version appeared with only a flat bulge instead of the scoop. From the third generation in 1954, the curvature was also eliminated. The body received three air holes on both sides and four exhaust pipes protruded to the right between the front wheel cutout and the door. In the following two years, it was only two pipes. For the 1957 season, the car was given a windscreen that stretched across the entire width of the cockpit instead of a small single pane.

The opening for the exhaust in the right-hand side section was retained on two cars from the last generation, although only one pipe was routed to the outside just in front of the rear wheel. The third car of the 1958 season had a body made of an electron instead of aluminum on a tubular space frame and thus weighed 595 kilograms. The sides were smooth and the front was pulled flat and sloping forward. Furthermore, the all-around glazing of the cockpit, aerodynamically clad headlights, a narrow cooling air opening, and a Kamm rear as an integral part improved the aerodynamic properties of the car.
