= Borgward B 611 =

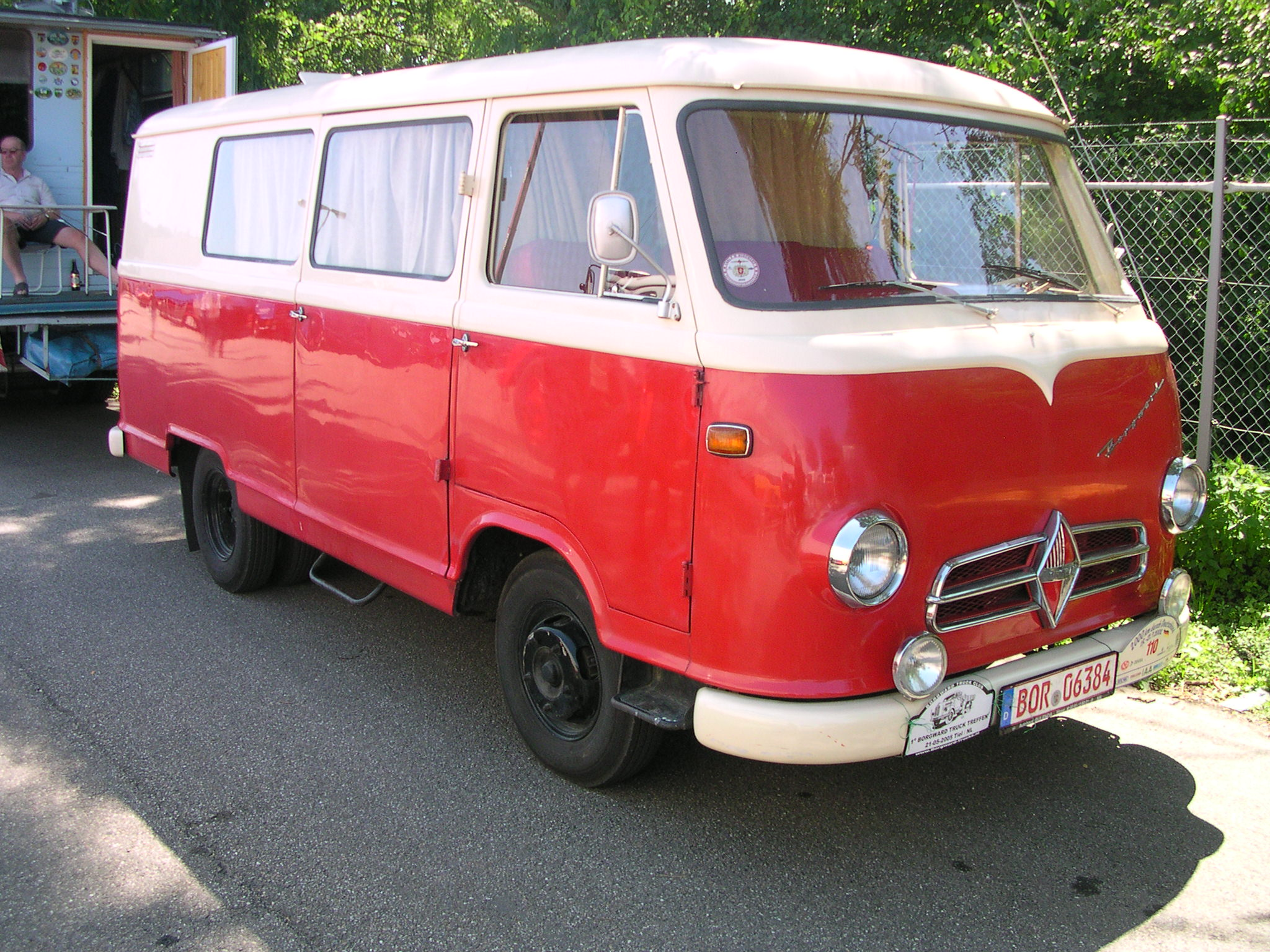
- Borgward B 611 "Omnibus"

Overview
- Manufacturer: Borgward
- Production: 1957-1961; 14,748 units
- Assembly: Bremen, Germany

Body and chassis
- Class: Light commercial vehicle
- Body style: van pickup minibus chassis cab

Powertrain
- Engine: 1493 cc (petrol/gasoline); 1758 cc (diesel)

Dimensions
- Wheelbase: 2,600 mm (102.4 in)
- Length: 5,100–5,200 mm (200.8–204.7 in); Van / Flatbed truck
- Width: 2,100 mm (82.7 in)
- Height: 2,180 mm (85.8 in)

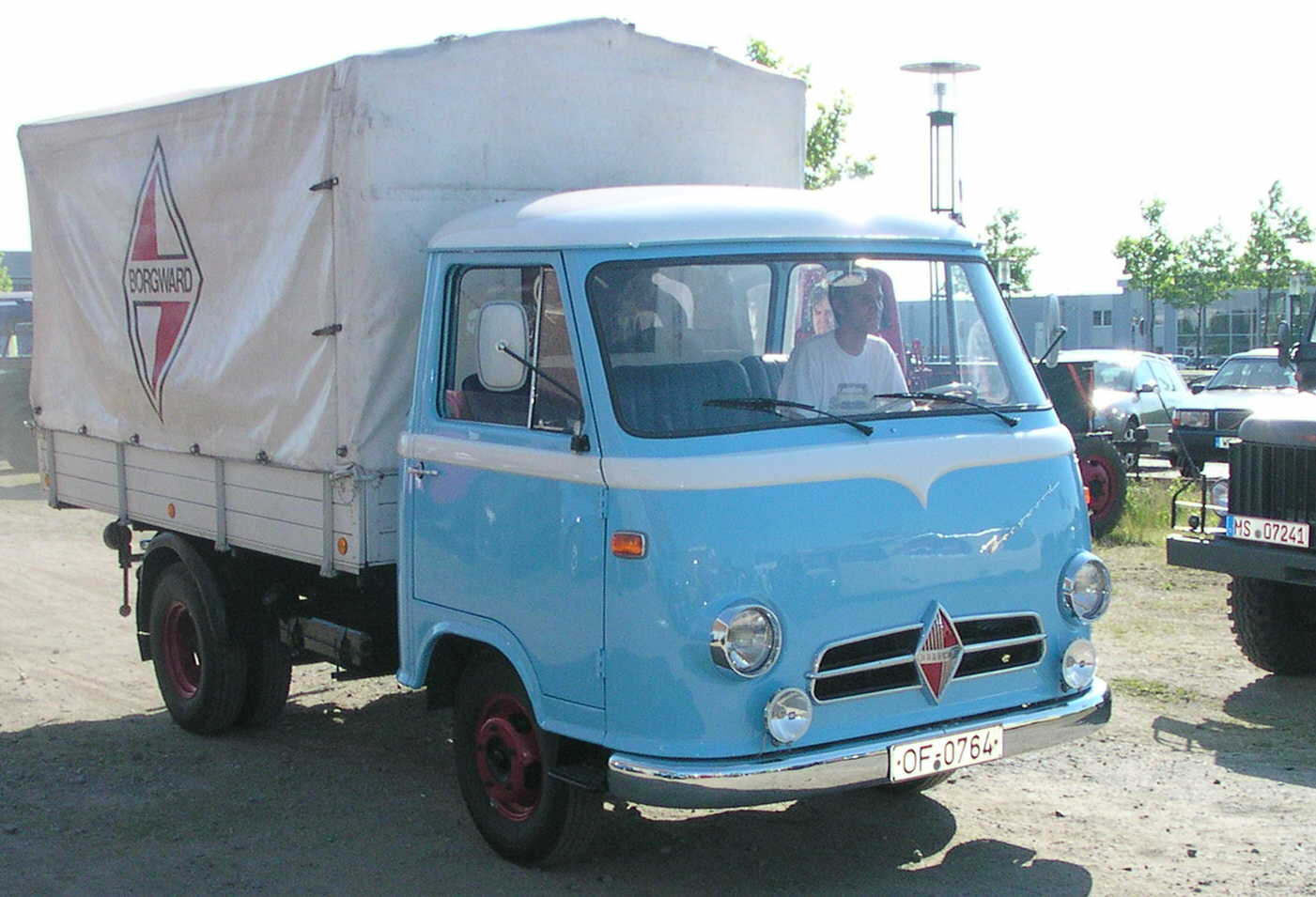
Borgward B 611 "Pritschenwagen"

The Borgward B 611 is a light commercial vehicle built by Borgward at their Bremen factory between 1957 and 1961. The nominal load capacity at launch was 1.5 (metric) tons. The vehicle was offered as a light van, a minibus (with seats in the back and more windows) or as a platform truck (Pritschenwagen), though various other body variants were available either directly from the manufacturer or from appropriately specialist vehicle body manufacturers.

The van was launched in 1957 with the name Borgward B 1500 F. The "F" suffix stood for "Frontlenker-Transporter", and referred a design feature that was a first for Borgward, whereby the driver was positioned right at the front of the vehicle rather than behind a bonnet/hood with an engine underneath it. The engine was installed in a large pod between the driver and his passenger. Where three seats were used in the driver's area the central passenger sat on top of the engine pod. According to most sources it was only in 1959 that the vehicle received the name by which it is more commonly remembered today, Borgward B 611.

== Engine and running gear ==
The front wheels were set back from the front of the car, and set between and above them, installed between the driver and his passenger, was a four cylinder four stroke water-cooled engine. B 611 buyers could choose between a petrol/gasoline fueled 1493 cc power unit delivering up to 60 hp (45 kW) and a diesel fueled 1758 cc unit with a maximum power output of just 42 hp (31 kW), but combining this with vastly superior fuel economy. The petrol/gasoline unit was shared with the Borgward Isabella that had been introduced a couple of years earlier. The gear ratios were not, however. The B 611 was delivered with a four-speed all-synchromesh manual gear change, controlled with a column mounted lever. Claimed top speed was 92 km/h (58 mph) for a petrol/gasoline powered van and a more leisurely 75 km/h (47 mph) for buyers selecting the diesel motor.

== Chassis ==
The B 611 sat on a ladder-frame steel chassis with transverse reinforcement bars. At the front independent suspension used laterally mounted wishbones with coil springs. At the back a rigid "swing" axle was suspended with longitudinally mounted leaf springs. The engine, clutch, transmission, radiator and front suspension were all supported by an additional subframe.

== Body ==
Light van designs placing the driver and the engine together at the front of a relatively flat fronted cab had been pioneered in France by Citroën in 1939 with a design that incorporated front wheel drive. Eleven years and one world war later Volkswagen had launched a flat fronted rear wheel drive light van with the engine at the back. By placing the engine at the same end of the vehicle as the driving wheels, both the Citroen and Volkswagen approaches avoided having to locate a drive shaft along the length of the load area. But the front-wheel drive solution required the front wheels to be attached using a type of universal joint that was difficult to mass-produce at an acceptable cost without sacrificing strength, while with the rear engined Volkswagen design it was difficult to load goods over the engine from the back of the vehicle. In 1955 Mercedes-Benz had addressed the competing challenges with the L319 which combined a driving position (shared with the engine) right at the front with rear wheel drive, using a driveshaft lifted from a passenger car design. With this design the drive shaft ran not through the load deck but below it. That necessitated a far higher load deck than on the Volkswagen van or the comparable contemporary Citroën design, and the entire structure of the Mercedes-Benz light van was taller than the Volkswagen. It was also significantly wider which meant that the driver's cabin, with an engine in the middle of it, was more specious than on the British light vans of the period. With the B 611 Borgward followed the Mercedes-Benz lay-out. The engine was at the front and the driving wheels were at the back. The load-floor was high enough to accommodate the drive shaft that connected them. With a width of 2,100 mm (82.7 in) the Borgward van was actually slightly wider than the 2,080 mm (81.9 in) wide Mercedes equivalent. Both of them were much wider than the Volkswagen van which by the late 1950s had grown to a width of 1,750 mm (68.9 in).

The width of the Borgward van enabled the manufacture to offer customers the possibility of a third seat, mounted on top of the engine, in the driver's cabin. The van was also fractionally longer than the Mercedes-Benz which Borgward had apparently benchmarked for the design. The B 611 nevertheless had long overhangs at each end, and while the 2,600 mm (102.4 in) wheelbase was identical to that found on the Borgward Isabella passenger car, it was a full 250 mm (9.8 in) shorter than that of the Mercedes-Benz L 319. Borgward publicity material of the time explained that this gave the vehicle a conveniently tight turning circle.

== Commercial ==
With a wide comfortable cabin offering space for three people and using uncomplicated technology the Borgward 611 won friends in the press and in the market place. By the time of Borgward's controversial bankruptcy in 1961 the manufacturer had produced 14,748 of them.
