= Borgward B 3000 =

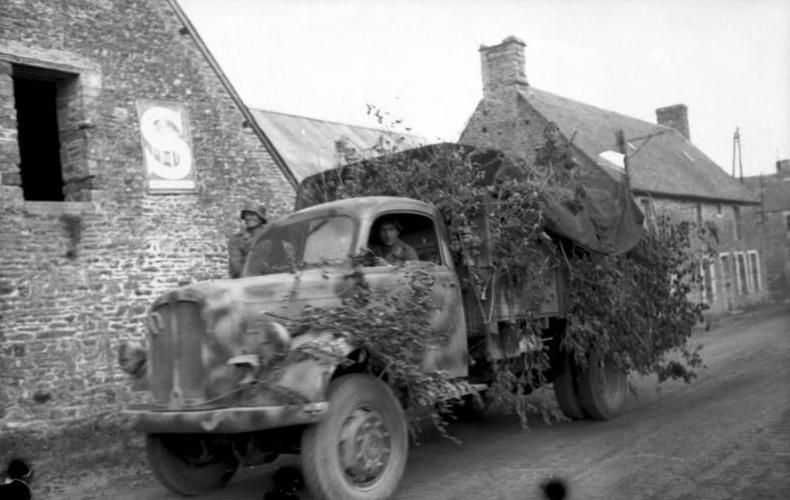
- Borgward B 3000 A in the Battle of Villers-Bocage on the invasion front in 1944. Notice the front differential of the all-wheel drive.
- Type: Truck
- Place of origin: Nazi Germany

Service history
- Wars: World War II

Production history
- Produced: 1938–1944; 1948–1950
- No. built: 30,000

Specifications
- Crew: 2

The Borgward B 3000 was a medium-sized truck made by German manufacturer Carl F. W. Borgward GmbH between 1941 and 1944 in the Bremen-Sebaldsbrück works. After World War II, B 3000 production continued from July 1948 to 1950. There was also an electric version named Borgward BE3000.

== Einheits-Lkw 3 t ==
Borgward started building trucks in 1937, supplying vehicles of up to five tons of payload until the start of the Second World War in 1939, including the 3-ton Borgward G. W. truck, available with petrol or Diesel engine.

A large contingent of these trucks was requisitioned by the Wehrmacht. Initially, production of the regular truck range continued. In 1940, the German truck manufacturers were directed to curtail the number of different models in order to focus on the production of simplified 'standard' trucks with a payload of around three tons.

As of 1942, production of the successor commenced. This new "Einheits-LKW" ("standard truck") was a 3-ton truck with the official designation Borgward B 3000 S/O (with a 3.7 litre, 78 hp petrol engine) or Borgward B 3000 S/D respectively (with a 5-litre, 75 hp Diesel engine, both with six cylinders). To save raw materials, the trucks were later simplified even further by measures like dropping the diamond-shaped Borgward badge on the grille or replacing the steel cabin with a standard wooden truck cabin ("Einheitsführerhaus").

The B 3000 was an adequate vehicle, but the lighter Opel 'Blitz' V 3000 proved superior.

== Production volume ==
Production
Type	Years	Payload	Number built
Borgward L 2000 S, L 2300	1937–1942	1,500 kg	
Borgward Europa V ( standard Diesel)	1938–1940	2,500 kg	2,400
Borgward Typ 3 t petrol G. W.	1938–1941	3,000 kg	
Borgward Type 3t diesel G.W	1938–1941	3,000 kg	
Borgward B 3000 S	1942–1944	3,125 kg	
Borgward B 3000 A	1942–1944	3,095 kg	
Borgward B 3000 D	1948–1950	3,400 kg	
Borgward 5 t	1938–1939	5,000 kg	
Borgward L 2000 S/L 2300 (Bus)	1937–1942		

Borgward produced other military vehicles besides trucks, especially the Sd.Kfz. 7 half-track, the Sd.Kfz. 251 armoured half-track and the Borgward IV carrier.

In all, about 30,000 3-ton trucks were built until the plant was destroyed by Allied bombing raids in 1944, with forced labour used in 1944. Plans to recommence production in order to build the Opel Blitz in Bremen could not be implemented when Bremen was conquered by British troops in 1945.
