= Borgward Hansa 2400 =

German car model built 1952-1959

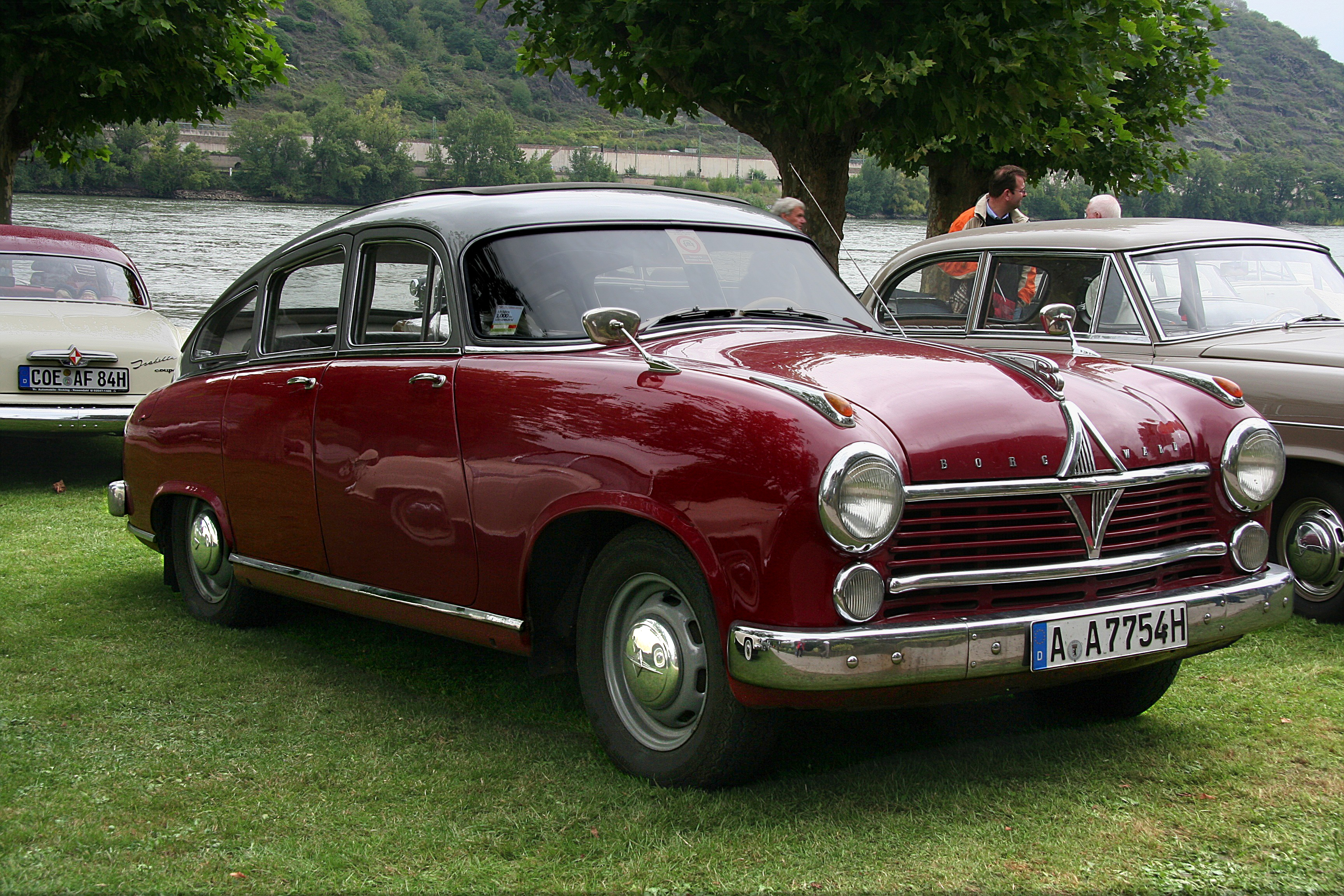

Overview
- Manufacturer: Carl F. W. Borgward GmbH
- Production: 1952–1959; 1,032 built
- Assembly: West Germany: Bremen-Sebaldsbrück

Body and chassis
- Class: Executive car (E)
- Body style: 4-door fastback saloon (1952–1955); 4-door notchback limousine (1953–1959)
- Layout: FR layout

Powertrain
- Engine: 2337 cc straight-6
- Transmission: 4-speed all-synchromesh manual automatic optional

Dimensions
- Wheelbase: 2,620 mm (103.1 in) (fastback); 2,820 mm (111.0 in) (notchback)
- Length: 4,460 mm (175.6 in) (fastback); 4,660 mm (183.5 in) (notchback); 4,760 mm (187.4 in) from 1955
- Width: 1,780 mm (70.1 in)
- Height: 1,490 mm (58.7 in) (loaded)

Chronology
- Successor: Borgward P100

The Borgward Hansa 2400 was an executive six-cylinder saloon (E-segment) presented in 1951, and manufactured by the Bremen based auto-manufacturer Carl F. W. Borgward GmbH from 1952 until 1959. The car was launched as a four-door fastback saloon; a longer-wheelbase notchback version appeared a year later. The Hansa 2400 suffered from teething troubles including inadequate brakes and problems with the automatic transmission Borgward developed for it. In a small, closely contested market, the large Borgwards lost out to less flamboyant Mercedes-Benz and BMW models from the German south.

== Chronology and design ==
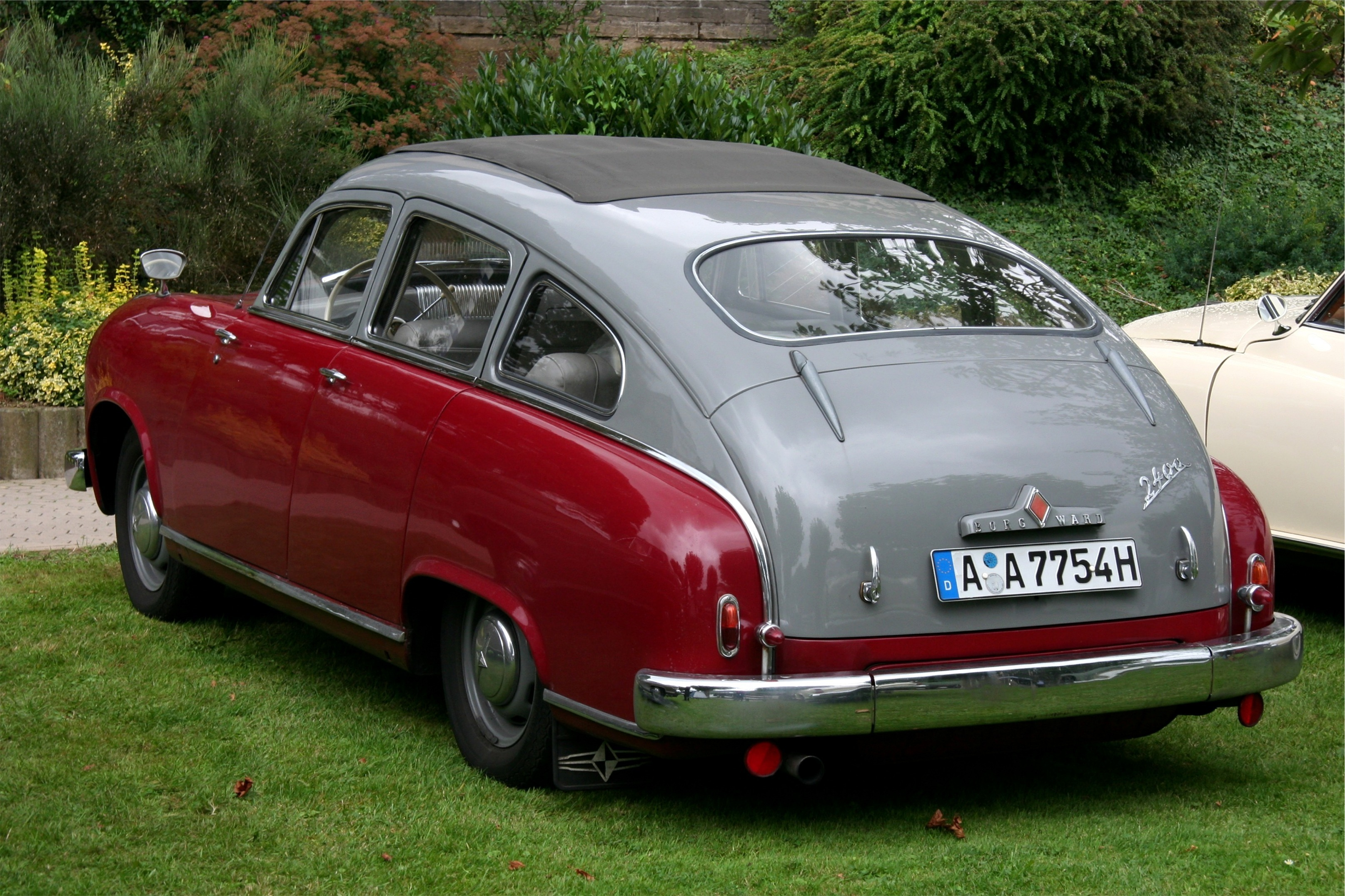
Fastback rear view

The Hansa 2400 commenced production in 1952 as a large fastback saloon, its profile reminiscent of the recently introduced Hudson Super Wasp. It had presence. Unusually at this time, all four doors were forward opening to presumably facilitate access and egress. The body was an all-steel integral structure, similar to on the car's four-cylinder sibling.

Sales material emphasized the car's luxury features, such as a heating and ventilation system ducting air direct to rear passengers as well as to the front, with each system and side separately adjustable. Luxury details such as the cigarette lighter, self-parking windshield wipers, and side windows lowering completely into the doors barely-merited a mention. The spare wheel was stowed flat in a compartment beneath the boot, accessible through a hatch behind a section of the rear bumper so a wheel change could be accomplished without the need to empty the luggage.

== New shape ==
Buyers generally rejected the streamlined, two-box fastback design and as a response, about one year later a more traditional-looking, longer-wheelbase notchback limousine version appeared. Options included a partition to enable the car to be used for traditional chauffeur operations. This was branded as the Hansa 2400 Pullman Limousine and its wheelbase was lengthened by 200 mm (7.9 in).

In 1955, production of the fastback saloon ceased. The long-wheelbase car underwent a minor facelift involving prominent headlamp surrounds. It was produced through 1959.

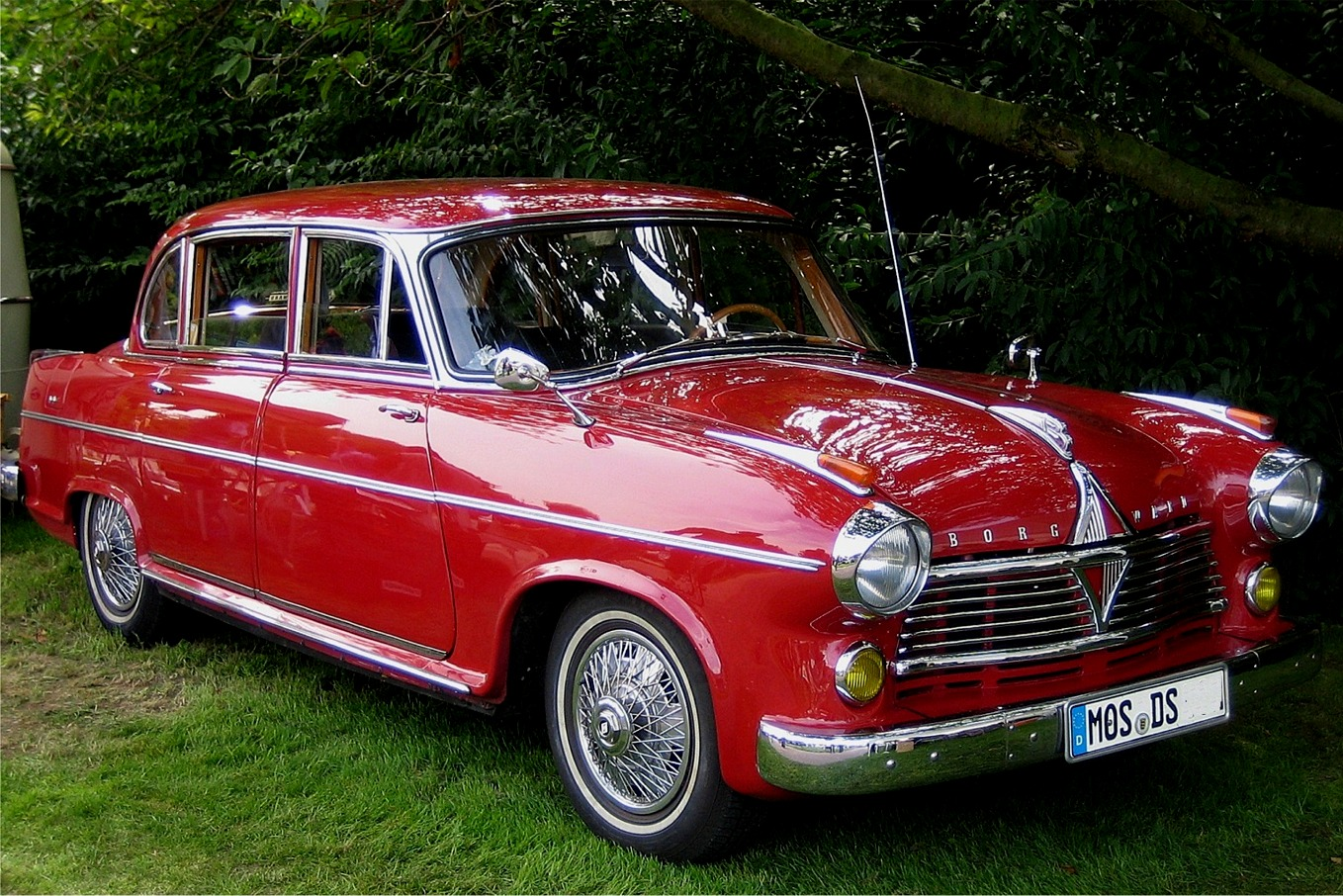
The three-box Hansa 2400 Pullman Limousine, which arrived a year after the fastback saloon.

== Power ==
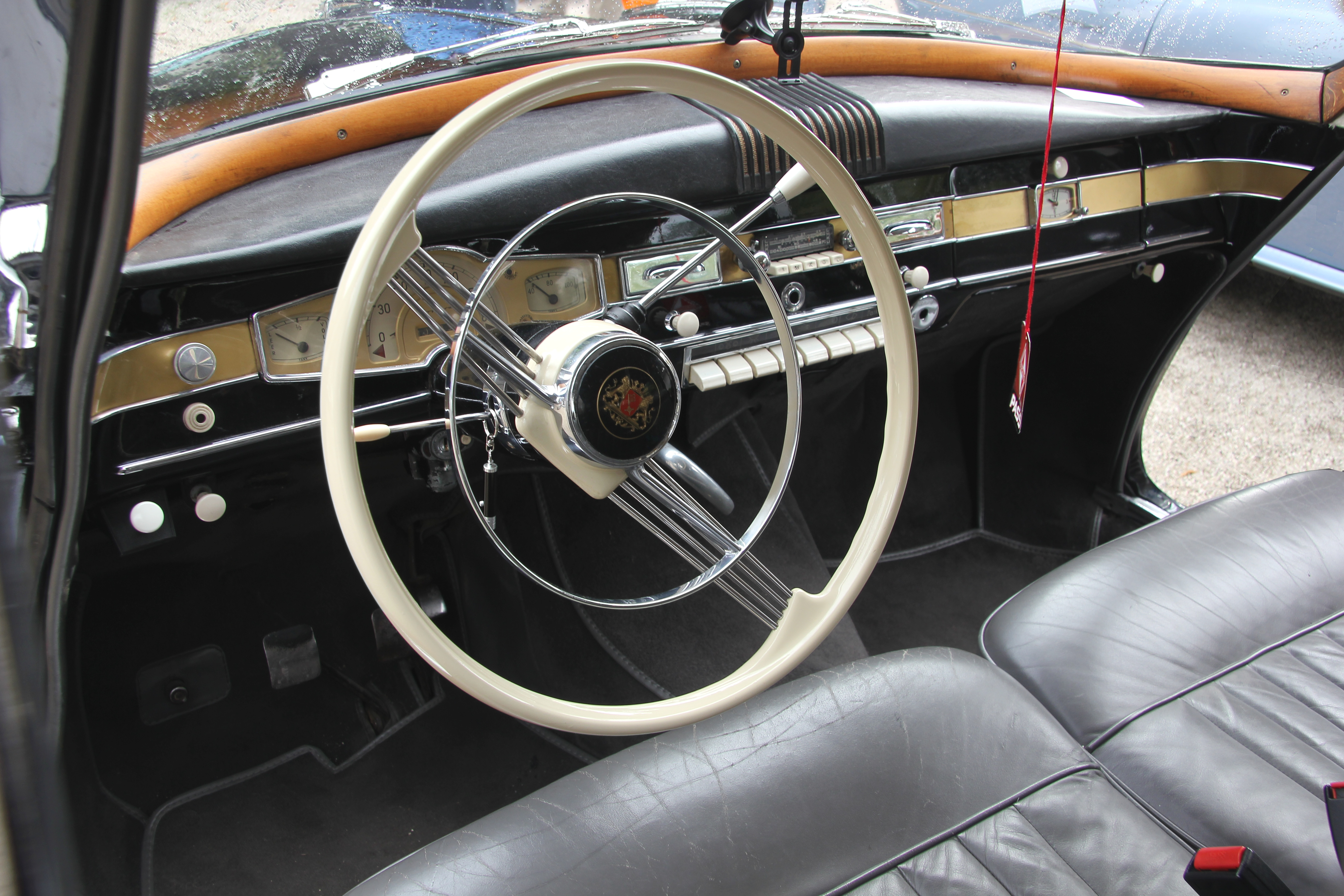
Interior

According to rumors, the vehicle was intended for the anemic four-cylinder 1758 cc engine. That engine went into an uprated version of the Hansa 1500. In the promotional event, the larger car launched with a six-cylinder engine of 2337 cc with a claimed power output of 82 PS (60 kW; 81 bhp) and a top speed of 150 km/h (93 mph). The 1955 package of improvements included engine modifications increasing the advertised output to 100 PS (74 kW; 99 bhp).

Power was delivered to the rear wheels via a four-speed manual gearbox with synchromesh on all ratios. An automatic gear change option was also advertised, making the car, according to some sources, the first German car to be offered with automatic transmission.
