= Borgward P100 =

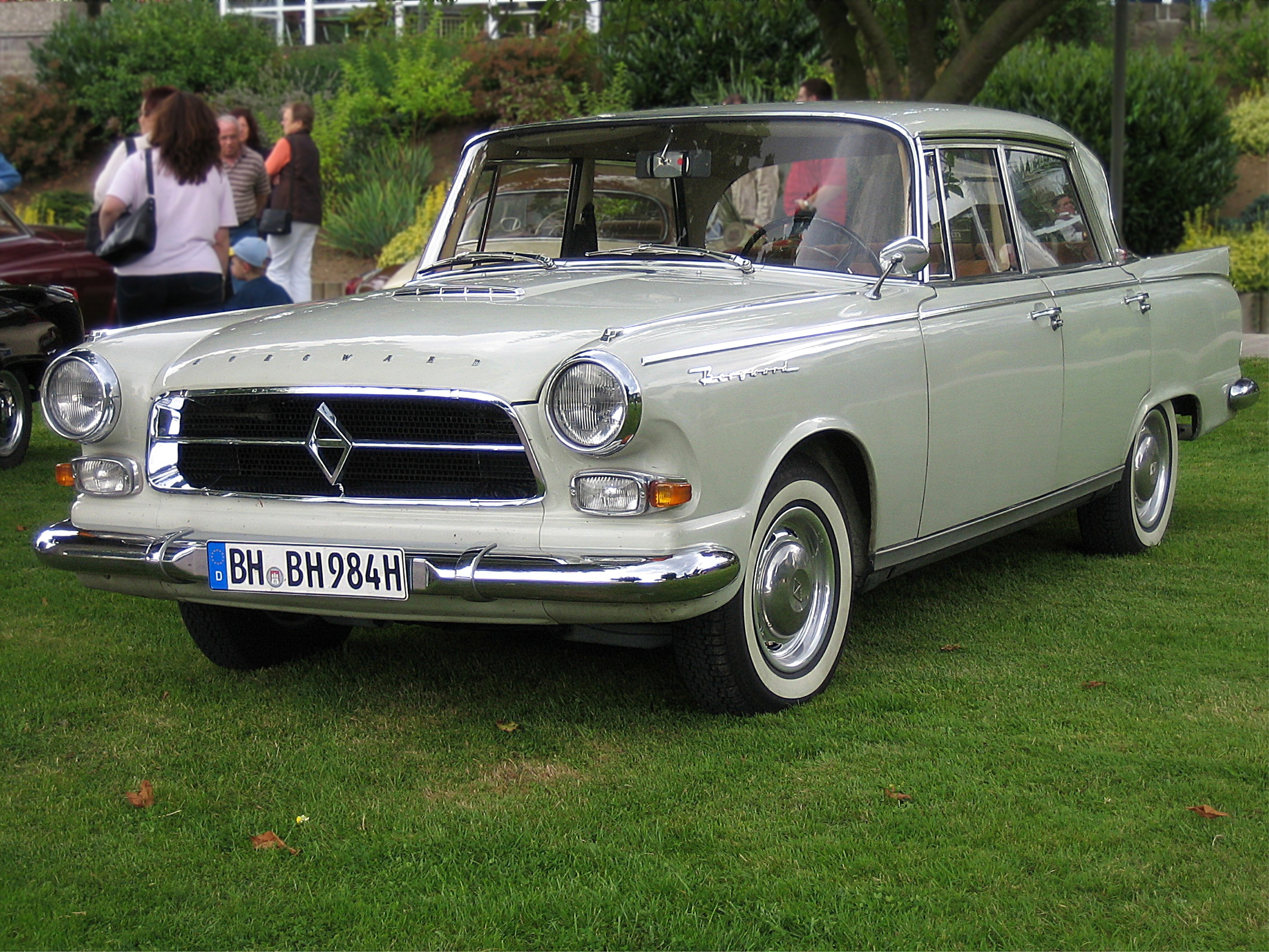

Overview
- Manufacturer: Carl F. W. Borgward GmbH
- Also called: Borgward 230
- Production: June 1959–1961; 2,530 built by Borgward

Body and chassis
- Body style: 4-door sedan
- Layout: FR layout

Powertrain
- Engine: 2,240 cc straight-6
- Transmission: 4-speed all-synchromesh manual

Dimensions
- Wheelbase: 2,650 mm (104.3 in)
- Length: 4,715 mm (185.6 in)
- Width: 1,738 mm (68.4 in)
- Height: 1,420 mm (55.9 in)
- Curb weight: 1,650 kg (3,638 lb) (loaded)

Chronology
- Predecessor: Borgward Hansa 2400 Pullman

The Borgward P100 is a large four-door sedan first presented in September 1959 at the Frankfurt Motor Show, and produced by the Bremen based auto-manufacturer Carl F. W. Borgward GmbH between January 1960 and July 1961.

== Design and engineering ==
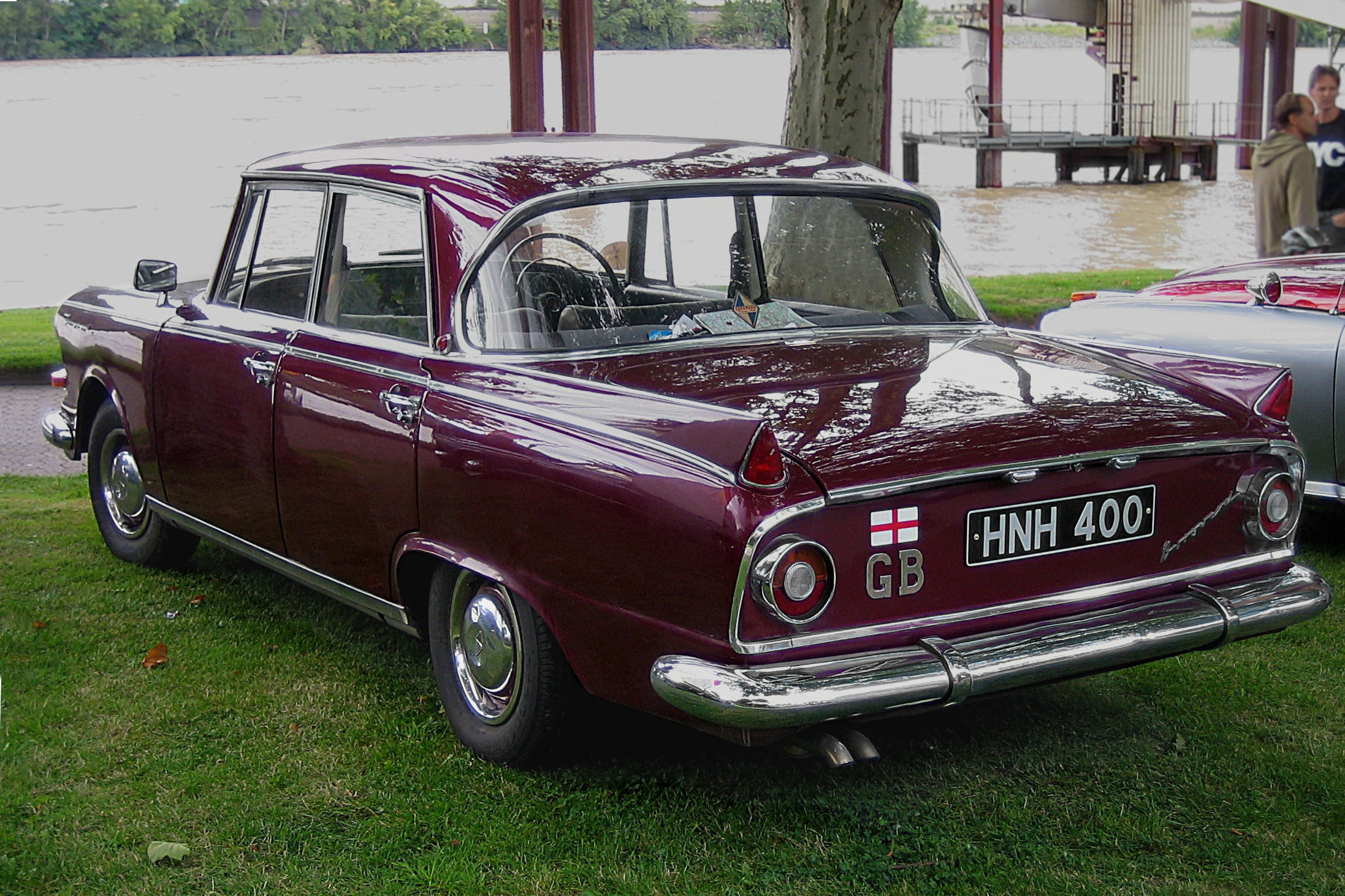
Rear view

The design featured the ponton, three-box design pioneered by Borgward in 1949, but now filled out to the relatively angular corners, reminiscent of the style being popularised by Pininfarina with designs such as that of the Fiat 1800, the Peugeot 404 or the Austin Westminster. Like the Farina designs, the P100 featured small angular tailfins.

The P100 followed the structural approach of the existing Isabella, incorporating an integral chassis.

The straight-6 2240 cc engine derived from that fitted in earlier Borgward six-cylinder sedans, of which the most recent had been the Borgward Hansa 2400 Pullman. Advertised performance figures included a power output of 100 bhp (75 kW) and a maximum speed of around 100 mph (161 km/h).

Contemporary publicity material highlighted the car’s revolutionary self-levelling air suspension.

== Commercial ==
The P100 was competing in the six-cylinder sedan sector which through the 1950s had become ever more dominated by Mercedes-Benz, whose 220SE model also received a modern chiselled body shape in 1960. Borgward’s previous six-cylinder sedans had achieved only limited market penetration, and early reports that the P100 was confirming Borgward’s reputation for introducing new models beset by teething troubles suggested that despite its technically adventurous suspension and modern style, the P100 might struggle to compete against Stuttgart’s well established reputation for producing dependable sedans. Nevertheless, during its nineteen months in production, the P100 notched up over 2,500 cars produced, putting it on course usefully to outperform earlier six-cylinder Borgwards in the market place. The bankruptcy of the business in August 1961 brought P100 production to an end, although the plant did complete another 47 cars in the days following the bankruptcy.

The model enjoyed a brief afterlife: the production line was sold and shipped to Mexico by Grupo Industrial Ramirez in Monterrey NL, where between 1967 and 1970 more than 2,000 additional P100s were produced.
