= Borgward =

German automobile manufacturer

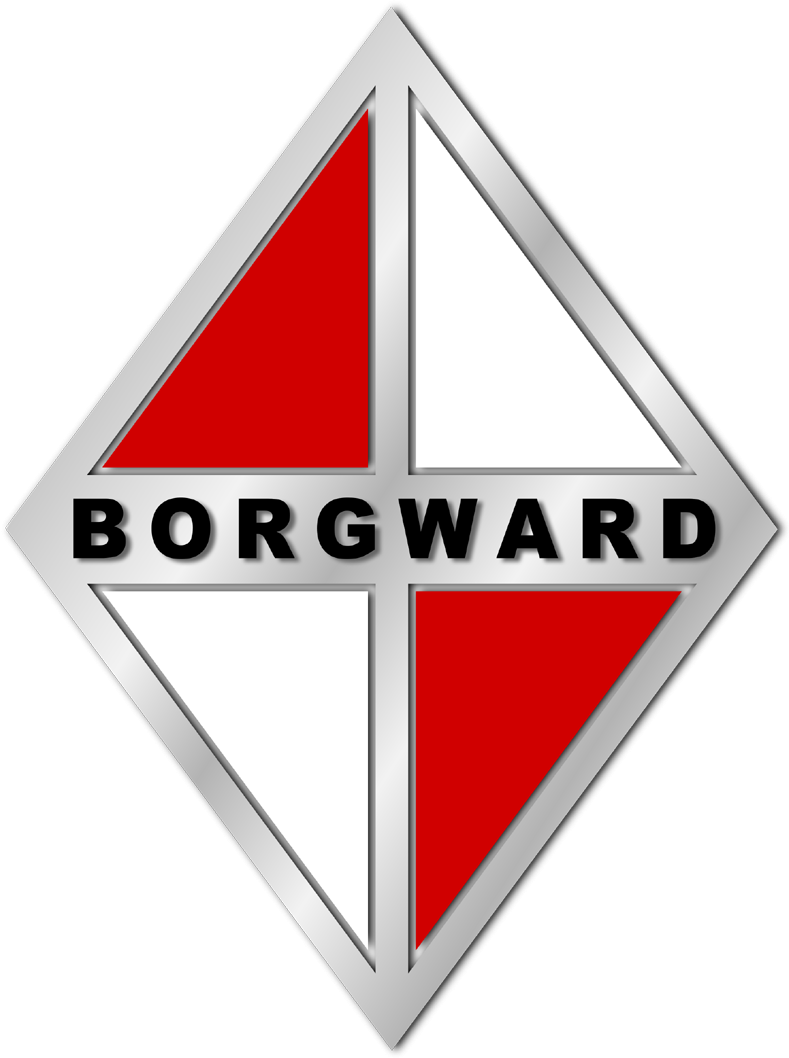
- Type: Private
- Industry: Automotive
- Founded: 1933; 93 years ago
- Defunct: 1963
- Headquarters: Bremen, Germany
- Key people: Carl F. W. Borgward
- Products: Automobiles

Borgward as a Formula One engine manufacturer
Formula One World Championship career
- First entry: 1959 British Grand Prix
- Last entry: 1963 German Grand Prix
- Races entered: 2 (1 start)
- Chassis: Cooper, Lotus
- Constructors' Championships: 0
- Drivers' Championships: 0
- Race victories: 0
- Podiums: 0
- Points: 0
- Pole positions: 0
- Fastest laps: 0

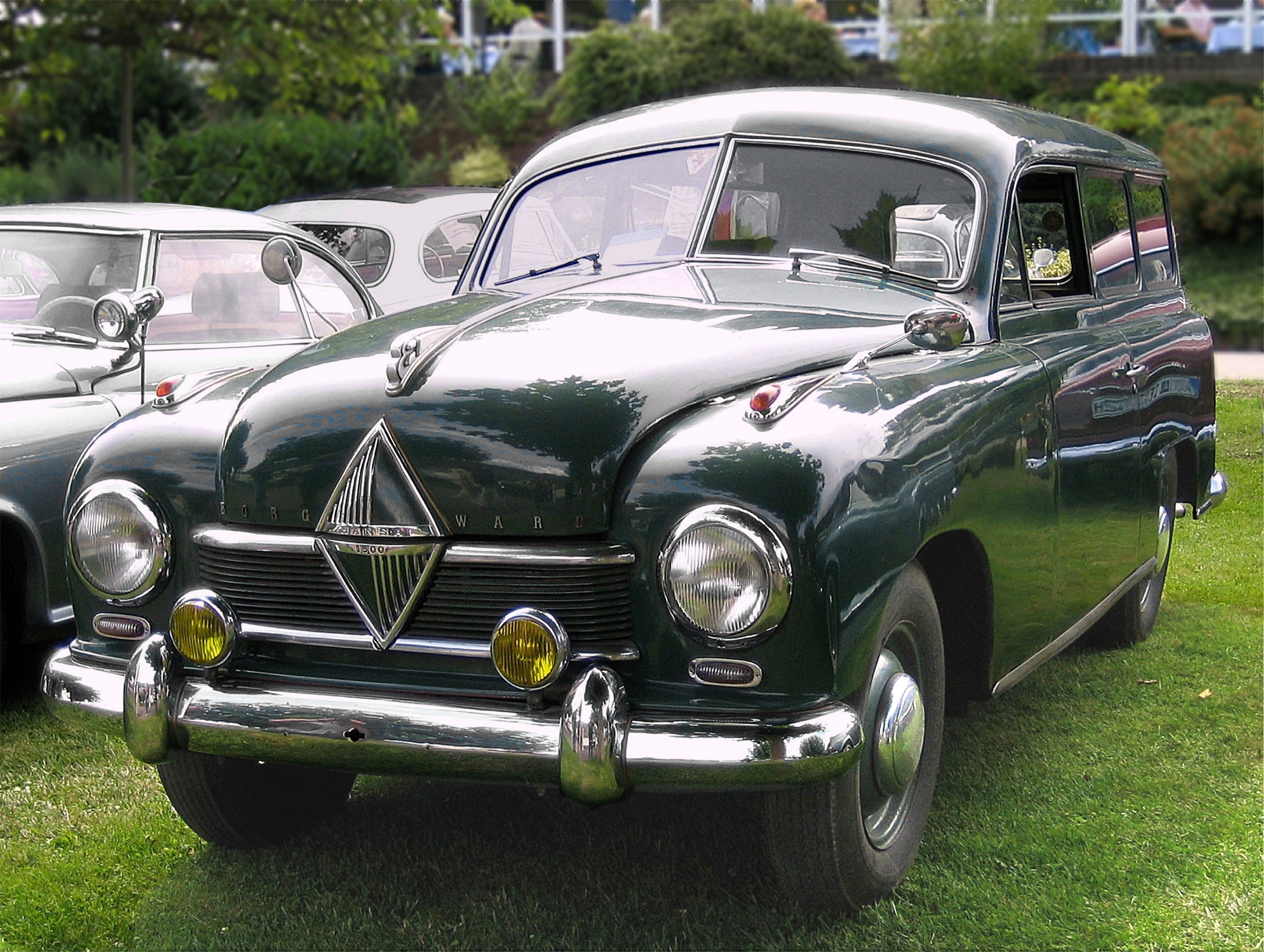
1952 Borgward Hansa 1500

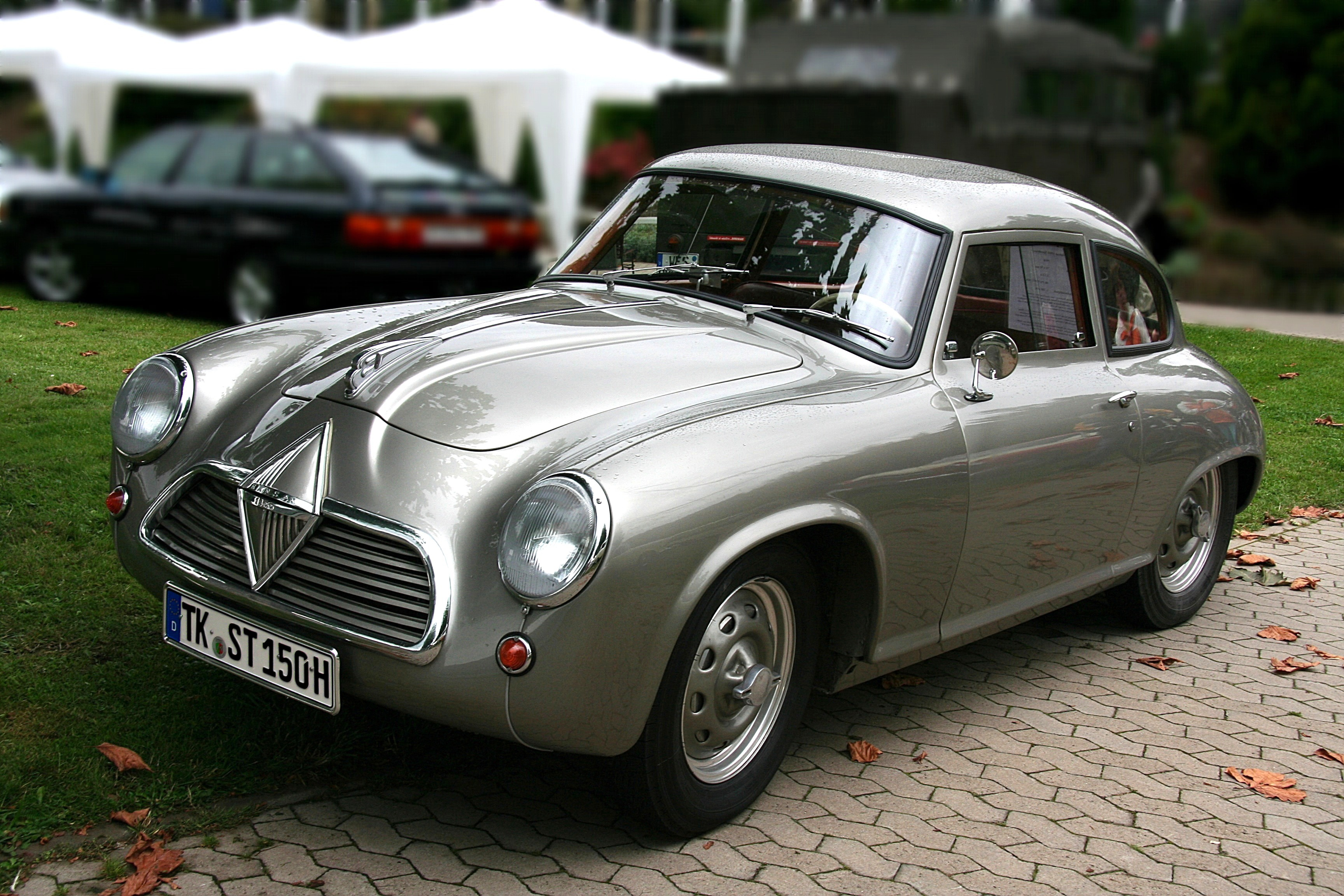
Borgward Hansa 1500 Sportcoupé (1954)

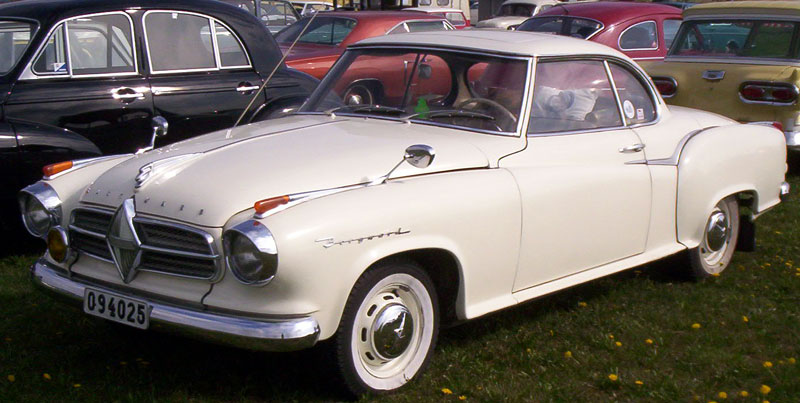
Borgward Isabella Coupé (2+2)

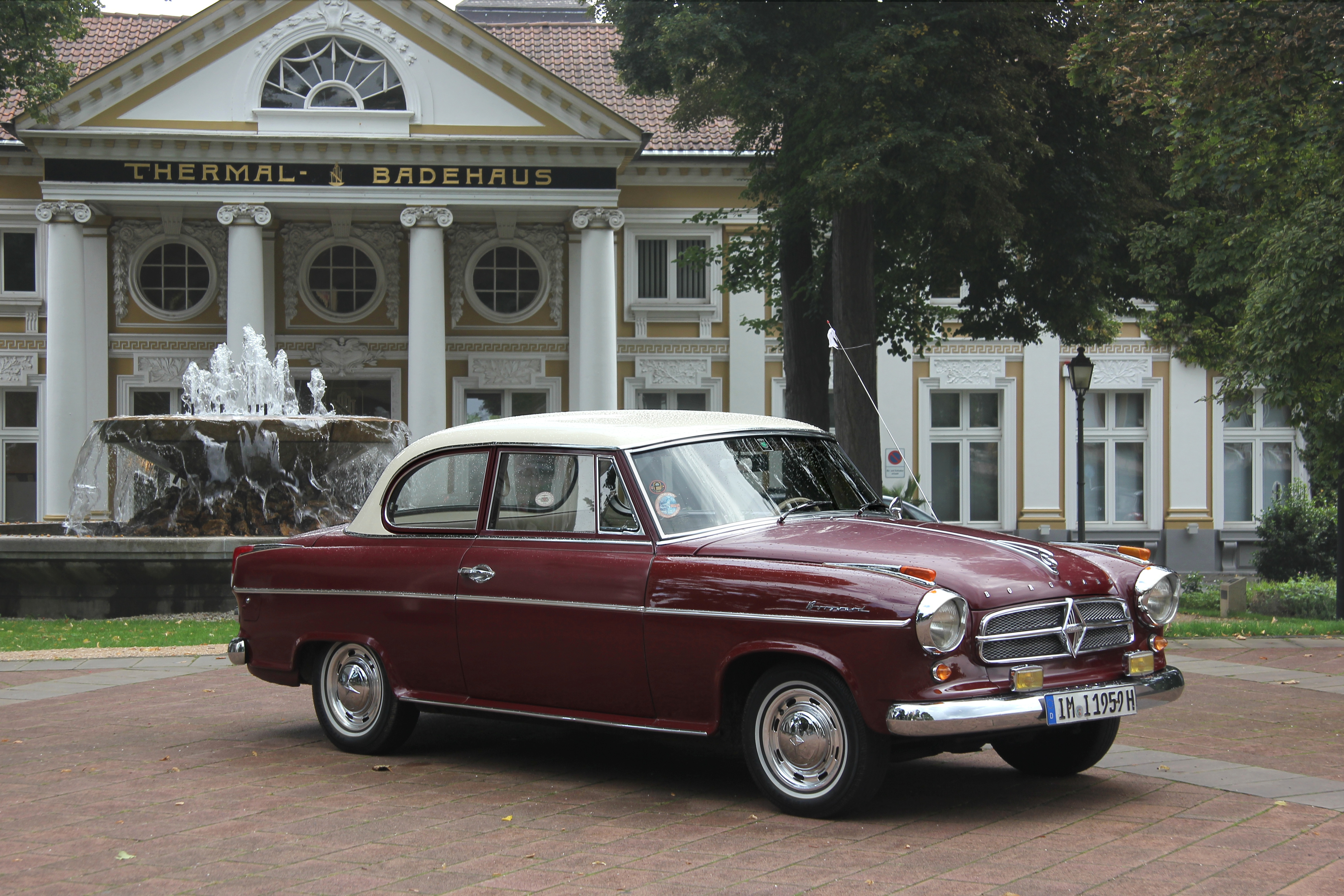
Borgward Isabella built in 1959

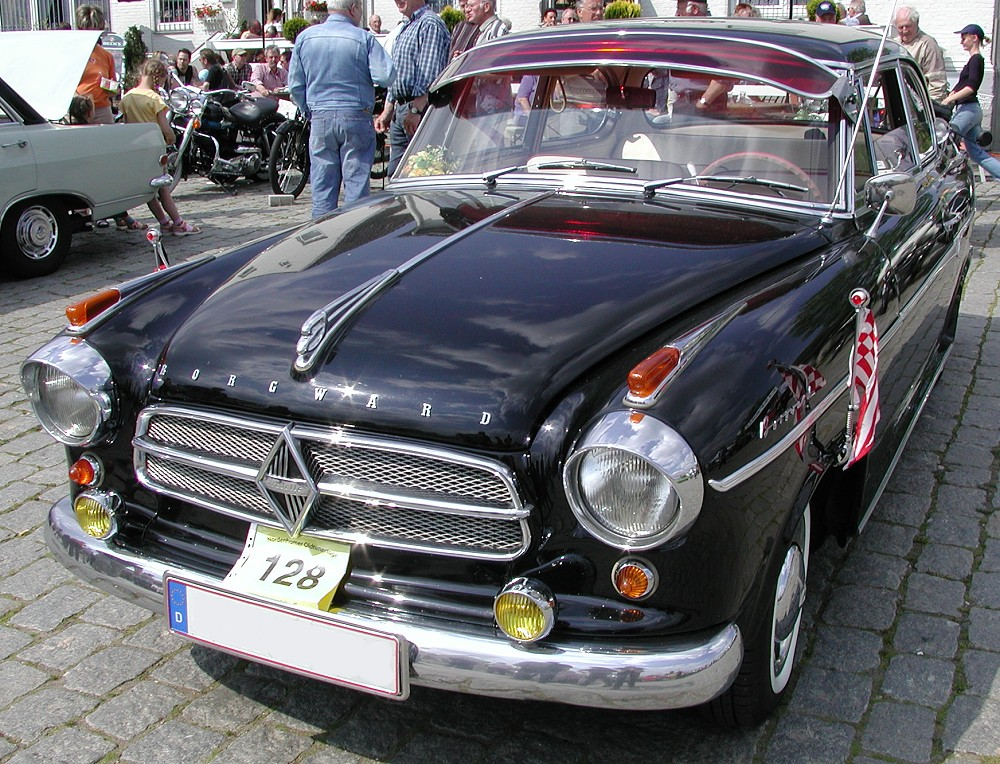
Isabella TS Deluxe

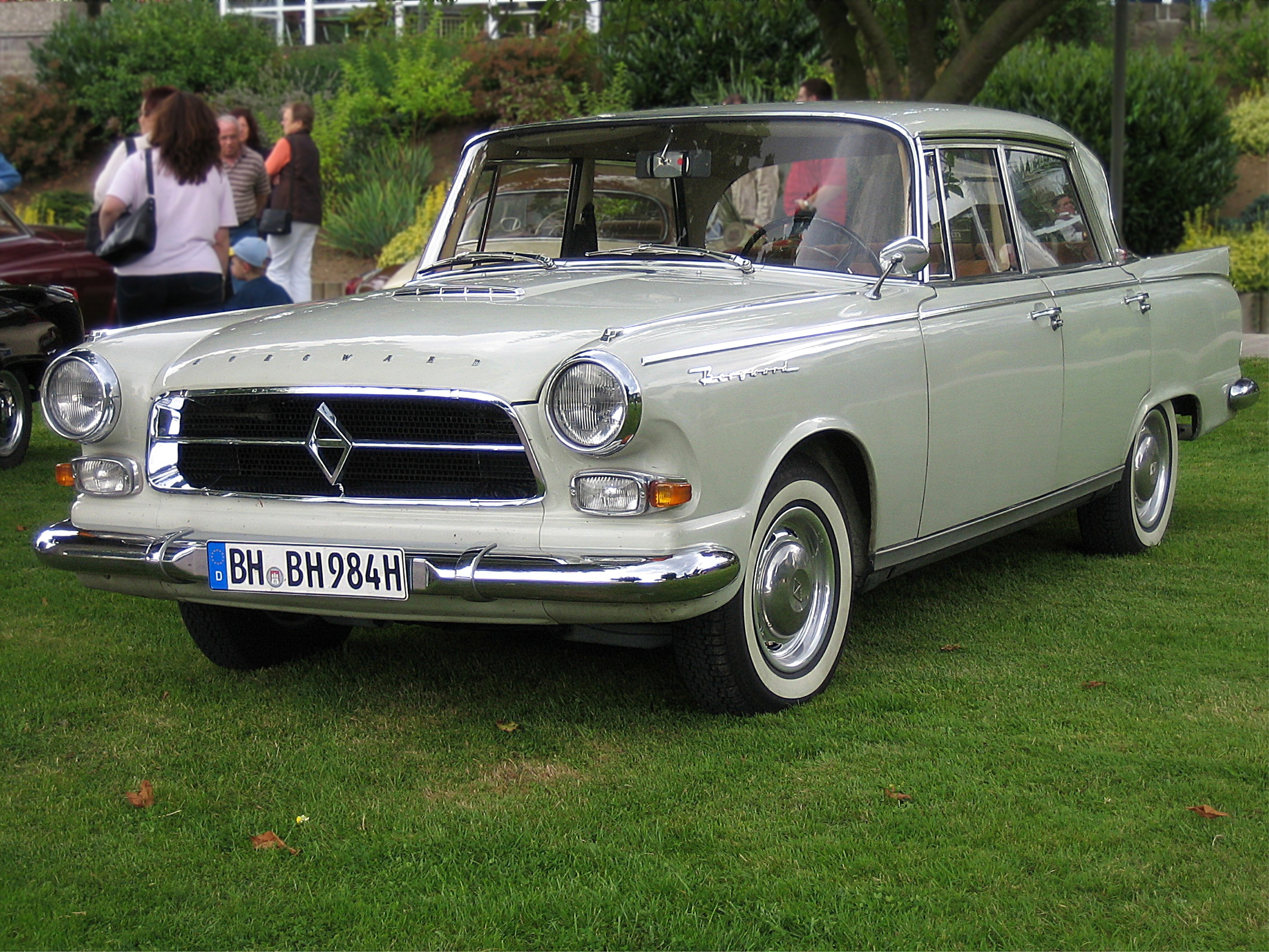
Borgward P100 with air spring

Borgward was a car manufacturing company, based in Bremen, Germany, founded by Carl F. W. Borgward (1890–1963). It produced cars of four brands, which were sold to a diversified international customer base: Borgward, Hansa, Goliath and Lloyd. Borgward's Isabella was one of the most popular German premium models in the 1950s, while Lloyd's Alexander / Lloyd 600 model offered affordable mobility to many working-class motorists.

The Borgward 1500 RS race car featured a very modern engine design with four-valve DOHC and fuel injection. The engine was re-used in Cooper T43 and T45 cars, most notably winning races for Stirling Moss in Formula Two and other series. For a Cooper T51 in 1959 and for a Lotus 18 in 1963, the engine was used in isolated Formula One races, but not scoring any points.

Despite success in the ongoing German Wirtschaftswunder economy miracle, Carl Borgward was reckless regarding cash flow, and his group ceased operations in 1961, following controversial insolvency proceedings. He died soon after, while the factory was taken over by competitors.

The brand was revived in the 21st century, with the Stuttgart-based Borgward Group AG designing and marketing cars manufactured in China before filing for bankruptcy in 2022.

== History ==
=== Origins of the component companies ===
The origins of the company go back to 1905 with the establishment in Varel (near Bremen) of Hansa Automobilgesellschaft and the foundation in Bremen itself of NAMAG, maker of the Lloyd car. These two businesses merged in 1914 to form the "Hansa-Lloyd-Werke A.G." After the war, in the troubled economic situation then confronting Germany, the business failed to prosper and by the late 1920s faced bankruptcy. For Carl Borgward, already the successful creator of the Goliath-Blitzkarren business, the misfortunes of Hansa-Lloyd presented an opportunity to greatly expand the scope of his auto business, and he took control of it.

=== Blitzkarren ===
The first vehicle Carl Borgward designed was the 1924 Blitzkarren (lightning cart), a tiny three-wheeled van with 2 hp (1.5 kW), which was successful in the market gap it filled. Traders with a small budget bought it for delivery. The Reichspost ordered many of them for postal service.

=== Hansa-Lloyd ===
In 1929, Borgward became the director of Hansa-Lloyd AG having been able to merge his Goliath-Werke Borgward & Co. with Hansa-Lloyd. The small Goliath-Blitzkarren had by now evolved into the three-wheeled timber-framed synthetic-leather-bodied 5 or 7 hp Goliath Pionier. Borgward turned his attention to the other businesses and led the development of the Hansa Konsul. In February 1937, there came the new Hansa Borgward 2000 and in 1939 its name was shortened to Borgward 2000. The 2000 model was followed by the Borgward 2300 which remained in production until 1942.

After World War II, in 1946 Carl Borgward used some of the brand names from businesses he had acquired over the years to found three separate companies: Borgward, Goliath and Lloyd. This was intended to increase the quantity of steel allocated to his business at a time of austerity and rationing. For many purposes the companies would be run as a single entity; but in a business operated by a man to whom delegation did not come naturally, the proliferation of legal entities nevertheless added unhelpful layers of complexity through the 1950s and encouraged a broadening of the range which in the end proved financially unsustainable with the sales volumes achievable. In 1949 the company presented the Borgward Hansa 1500.

One of the top engineers at Borgward from 1938 to 1952 was Dipl. Ing. Hubert M. Meingast.

=== Isabella and P100 ===
Production of the Borgward Isabella began in 1954. The Isabella would become Borgward's most popular model and remained in production for the life of the company. In 1959 the Borgward P100 was introduced, equipped with pneumatic suspension.

=== Borgward RS race car and DOHC engine ===
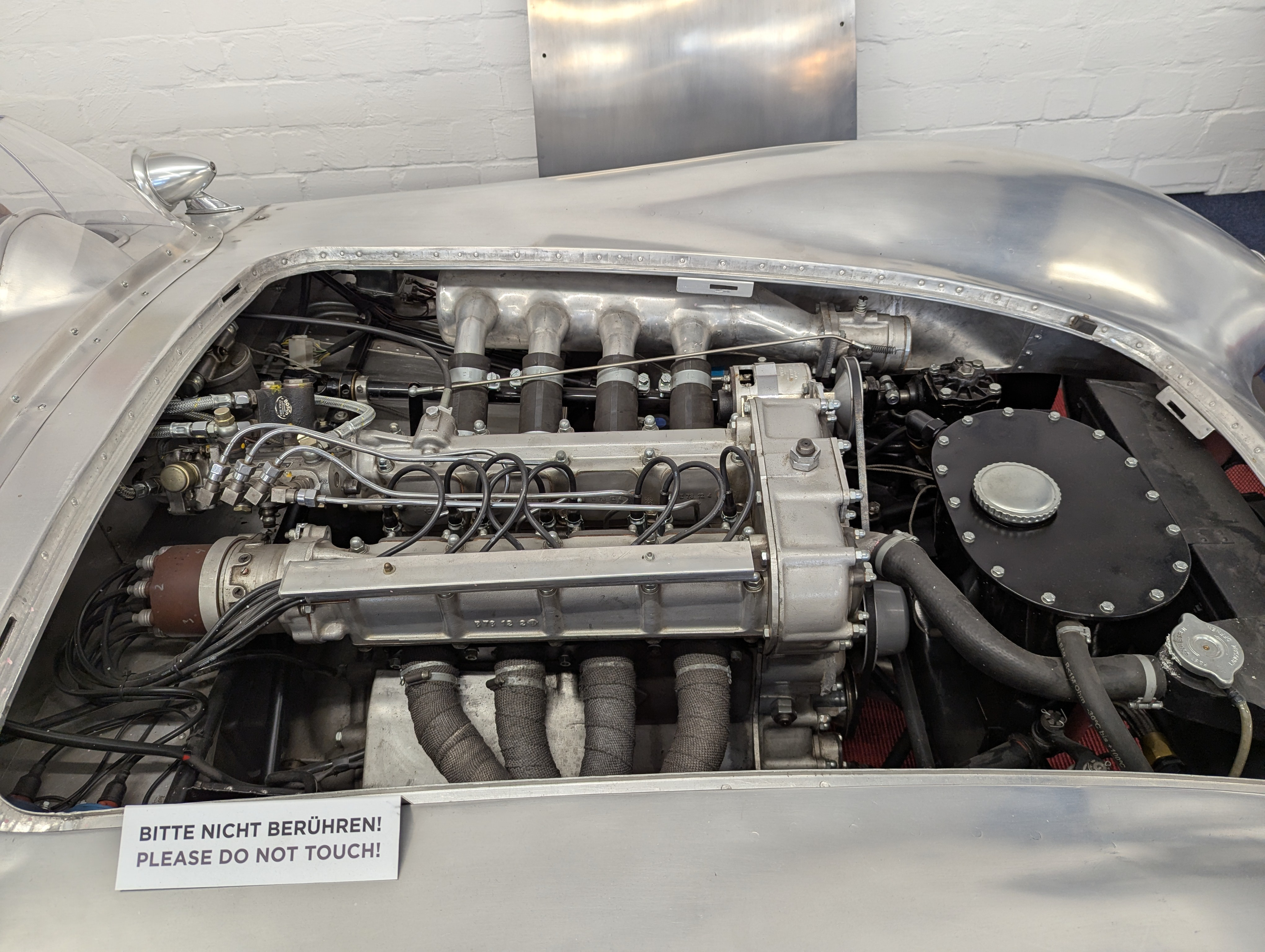
Borgward 1500 RS 4-cyl engine introduced in 1954 featured DOHC 4-valve with fuel injection, predating similar designs

Borgward introduced the Borgward 1500 RS line of 1500 cc sports racers in the 1950s that competed with Porsche 550, Porsche 718 and others. The chassis was not refined enough, thus Borgward stopped the effort in 1958, but the race-spec 4cyl powerplant was very sophisticated for the time. The fuel-injected 16-valve DOHC engine became a successful Formula Two power unit in Cooper chassis for Stirling Moss, and was also used by some F1 privateers in 1961 under new 1500cc rules. The demise of the company stopped the race engine development, but the layout became common elsewhere.

=== Controversial company bankruptcy ===
In 1961, the company was forced into liquidation by creditors. Carl Borgward died in July 1963, still insisting the company had been technically solvent. This proved to be true in the sense that after the creditors were paid in full, there was still 4.5 million Marks left over from the business.

Reports of difficulties at Borgward surfaced in an article that appeared in Germany's news magazine Der Spiegel on 14 December 1960. A Spiegel article was highlighted by means of a picture of Borgward, cigar in mouth, on the magazine's front cover. It was strongly critical of his business approach, and included many of the arguments later advanced to explain or justify the company's demise. The widest range of cars from any manufacturer in Germany, produced by three till recently operationally autonomous companies (Borgward, Goliath and Lloyd) was supporting a turnover of only 650 million Marks, placing the overall sales value from the combined Borgward auto businesses only in fifth position among Germany's auto-makers. The 70-year-old Carl Borgward's "hands-on" insistence on an increasingly manic proliferation of new and modified models featuring adventurous, but under-developed technological innovations (fast manisch[e] Konstruierwut (near manic design frenzy)) gave rise to components which too often did not work, broke down or fell apart, resulting in massive bills for pre-delivery remediation and/or post delivery warranty work that found their way back to the company.

The December 1960 Der Spiegel article was not the only serious public criticism targeting Borgward at this time: suddenly stridently negative (if more succinct) comments also turned up in the mass-market Bild newspaper and in television reports. Critical media commentaries also appeared concerning large loans to the Borgward Group provided by the local Landesbank.

It is apparent that the business was confronting cash-flow difficulties at the end of 1960. Capital intensive businesses such as auto manufacturing use their expensive machines and tools most efficiently if they use them constantly at full capacity, but the car market in Europe in the 1950s/60s was more seasonal than today, with sales diminishing in Winter, then peaking in the early summer months: Borgward's inventory of unsold cars at the end of 1960 was higher than usual, reflecting ambitious growth plans, most obviously in respect of the United States market The December 1960 Der Spiegel article speculated that of the 15,000 Borgward cars ordered by the North American dealers in 1960 (and of the 12,000 delivered to them) 6,000 might have to be taken back following a slump in North American demand. (Borgward was not the only European auto maker hit by a North American slump in demand for imported cars during 1960. In the same year two ships carrying Renault Dauphines were turned back in mid-Atlantic because the docks in New York were overcrowded with unsold Dauphines.)

At the end of December 1960 Borgward approached the bank for a further one million Marks of credit, the loan to be backed by a guarantee from the Bremen regional government which initially the Bremen senators agreed to provide. However, following the flood of critical press comment the senators withdrew their guarantee. They now required Carl Borgward to pledge the company itself to the state in return for the guarantee. After a tense 13-hour meeting widely reported in a still hostile media, Borgward agreed to the senate's terms on 4 February 1961, thereby averting the bankruptcy of the business.

The Bremen Senate also insisted on appointing its own nominee as chairman of the company's supervisory board. The man they chose was Johannes Semler whom reports generally describe as a "Wirtschaftsprüfer" (public auditor), though this designation, especially once translated into English, does less than full justice to the breadth of Semler's career. He had studied law at university and worked initially as a lawyer. The scion of a leading Hamburg political family, in 1945 he had himself been a founding member of the centre-right CSU party, and was a member of the Bundestag between 1950 and 1953. Despite his Hamburg origins, Semler was by this time based in Munich, with a network of contacts in the Bavarian establishment that probably included fellow CSU politician and the future German chancellor, Ludwig Erhard, who in 1948 had succeeded Semler in a top administrative position within the Bizone. The appointment of Johannes Semler as the representative of the Bremen senators to chair the Borgward supervisory board would, in retrospect, contribute to the controversy that followed the Borgward bankruptcy.

On 28 July 1961, Semler, as chairman of the supervisory board, joined the directors of the three companies Borgward, Goliath and Lloyd to instigate proceedings for the establishment of a "Vergleichsverfahren", which would have provided for a court sanctioned scheme of arrangement enabling the business to continue to trade while at the same time protecting the interests of creditors. Two months later, however, in September 1961, the Borgward and Goliath businesses were declared bankrupt, followed in November by the Lloyd business. Subsequent "conspiracy theorists" have suggested that Semler, for reasons of his own, never had any intention of allowing the Borgward auto-businesses to survive.

=== Post mortem ===
The German magazine Der Spiegel published a thoughtful piece in 1966, implying that with a little more support, and if the proprietor had been more willing to take advice from his own directors, the Borgward company could have easily overcome its financial problems of 1961. But Carl Borgward was financially naive and reluctant to accept advice: his preferred source of credit had always involved shunning the banks and simply taking extra time to pay his creditors, rejecting advice on the financing of his business from his own finance director. By autumn 1960 he was holding on to unpaid creditor invoices worth more than 100 Million Marks for sheet metal and tyres alone. Given that all the company's creditors were eventually paid in full, the liquidation decision appeared nevertheless to have been taken prematurely.

Borgward's factory in Bremen was acquired by the Kassel-based heavy vehicle manufacturer Henschel, that in 1969 merged with Hanover-based Hanomag. In 1972, the truck division of Hanomag-Henschel was acquired by Mercedes-Benz, that first began producing its T1 vans there, until in 1978 also started producing the station wagon of the W123 model range.

=== Production in Argentina ===
Borgward Argentina was founded in 1954 as a joint venture of Carl F. Borgward GmbH and IAME (Aeronautics and Mechanical Industries) intended to equip the Rastrojero, a small pickup truck. The engine was manufactured at the plant that Borgward had in the town of Isidro Casanova, Buenos Aires province, at a production rate of 20 units per day with almost 800 employees. The production of Borgward Isabella was carried out in Cordoba city, by using Argentine engines, local components (glass, batteries, tires) and other pieces from Germany. This model production started in 1960 at the booming of Argentina automotive industry development, with a production plan of 500 units for that year.

When the German parent company closed its doors in 1961, the operation happened to have local control, and continued for a short time to complete the total manufacture of 1,050 cars during its short life in Argentine territory.

=== Production in Mexico ===
As part of the bankruptcy process, in 1963, all manufacturing equipment for the Borgward Isabella and P100 was sold to a buyer in Monterrey, Mexico. Production in Mexico was delayed, but was started in August 1967 by entrepreneur and trucking magnate Gregorio Ramirez Gonzalez. Production in Mexico ceased in 1970.

== Revival ==
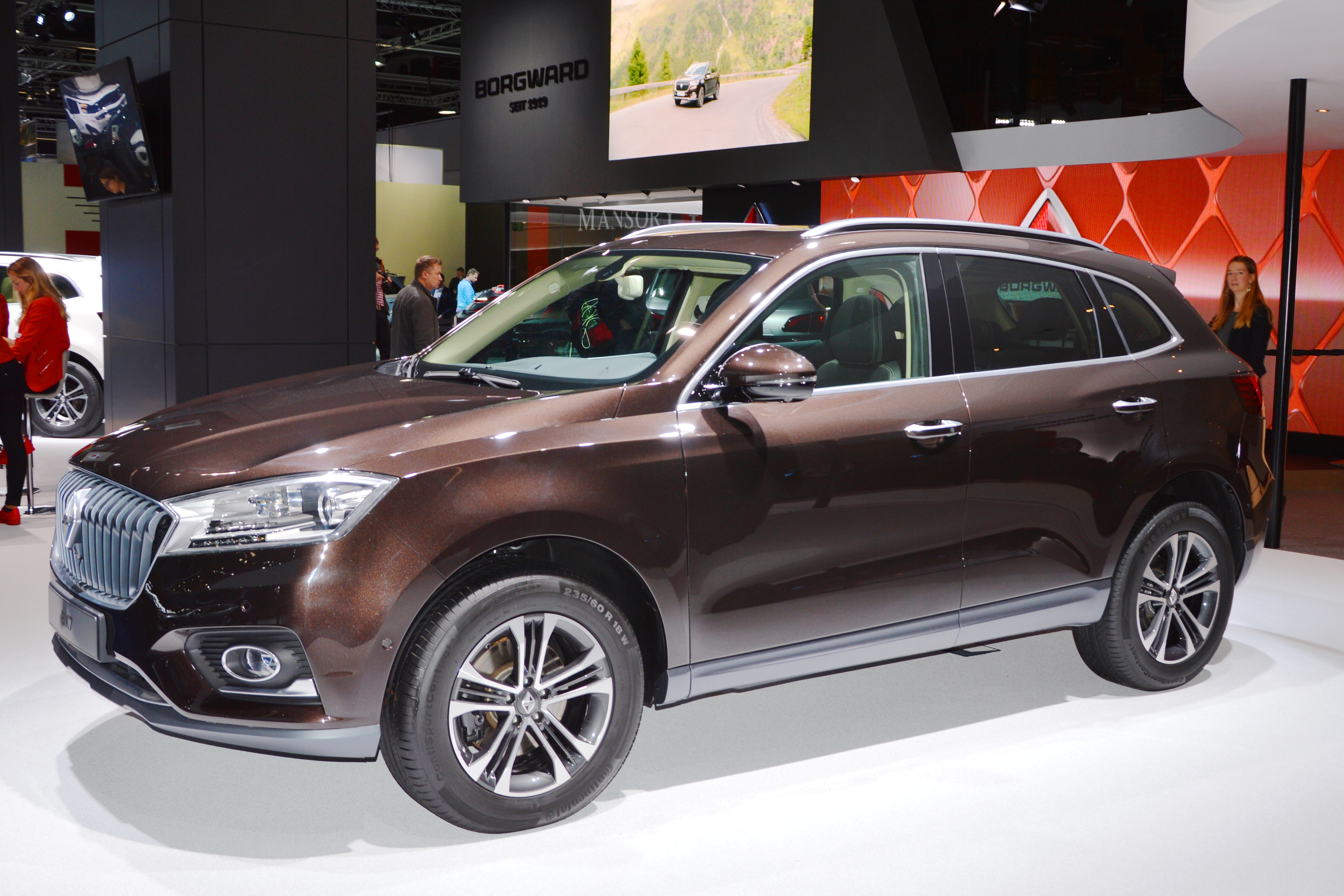
Borgward BX7 at IAA 2015

In 2008, the Borgward Group AG was formed in Lucerne by Christian Borgward (grandson of Carl F. W. Borgward) and Karlheinz L. Knöss. The new company later moved to Stuttgart. With both investment and manufacture by Beiqi Foton Motor (a subsidiary of BAIC, a major Chinese automotive group), the Borgward group had started to sell SUVs by January 2017.

It filed for bankruptcy in Beijing on April 8, 2022.

== Models ==
=== Cars ===
- Borgward 2000
- Borgward 2300
- Borgward Arabella
- Borgward Hansa 1500
- Borgward Hansa 1800
- Borgward Hansa 1800 D
- Borgward Hansa 2400
- Borgward Isabella
- Borgward P100
- Borgward 230

=== Trucks ===
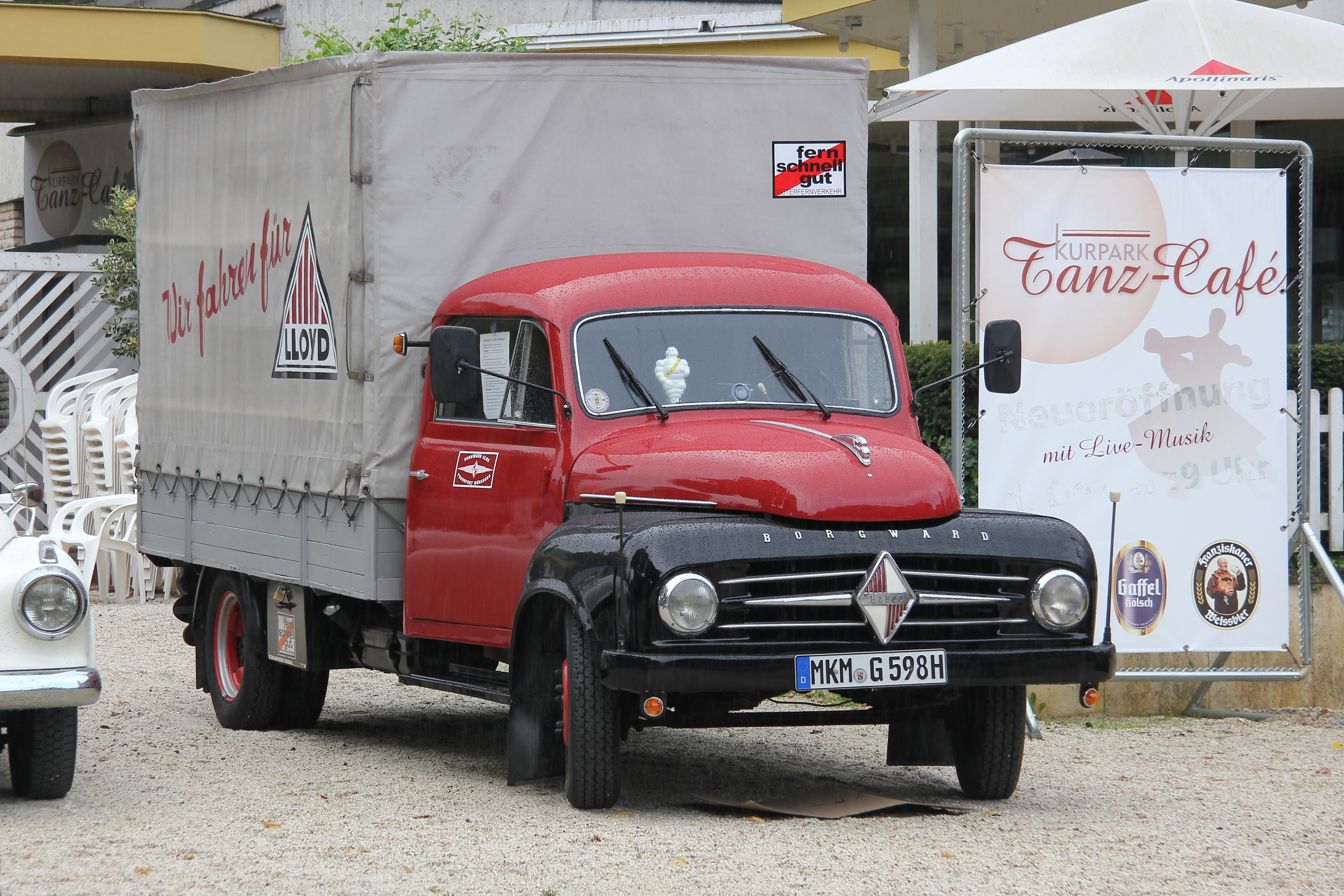
Borgward B 1500, built from 1954 to 1960

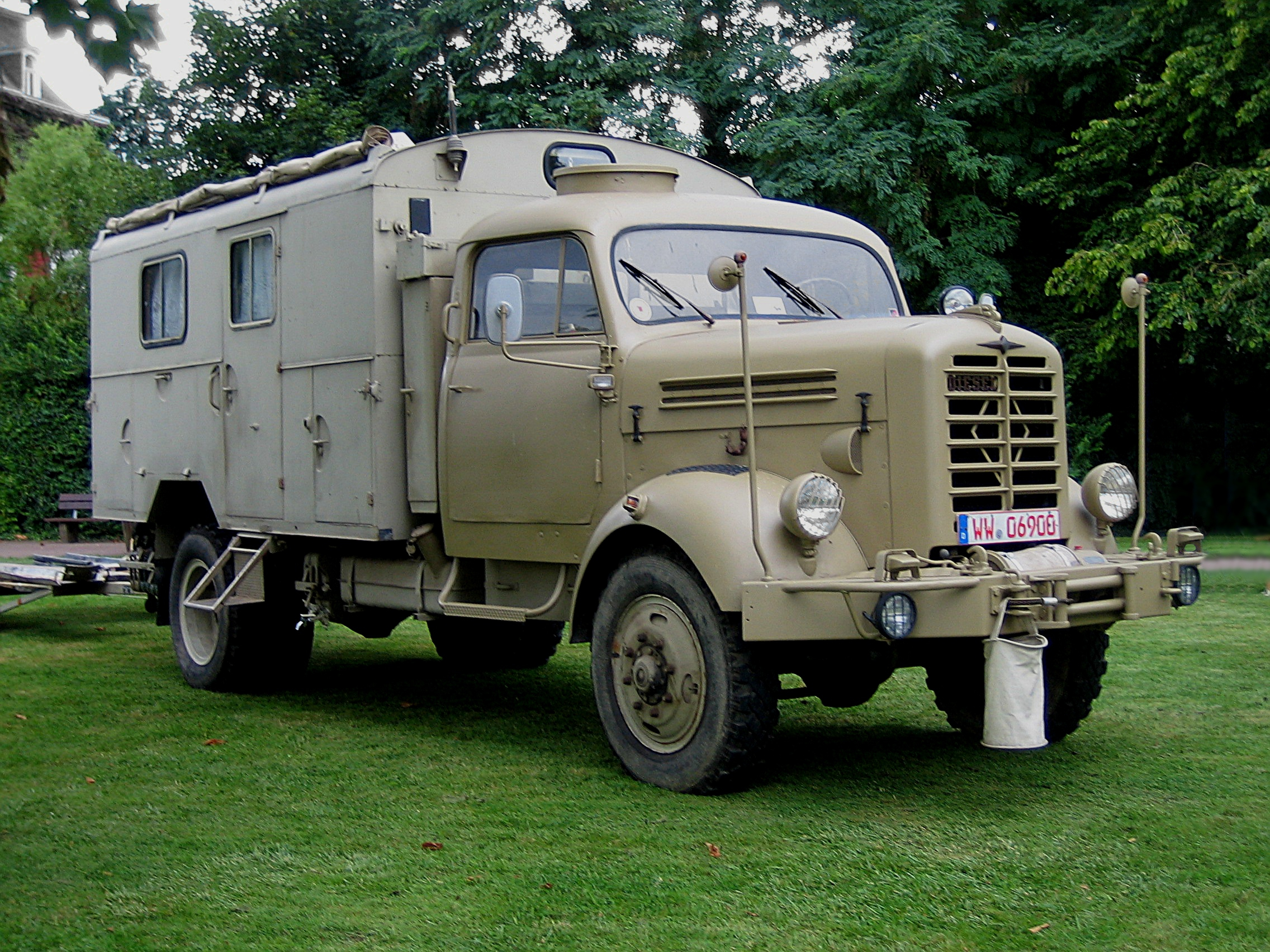
Borgward B 4500 A from 1954 to 1961

- Borgward B 611
- Borgward B 622
- Borgward B 655
- Borgward B 1000
- Borgward B 1000Z
- Borgward B 1250
- Borgward B 1500
- Borgward B 1500F
- Borgward B 2000
- Borgward B 2500
- Borgward B 3000
- Borgward B 4000
- Borgward B 4500
- Borgward B 522
- Borgward B 533
- Borgward B 544
- Borgward B 555

=== Military vehicles ===
- Sd.Kfz. 301 Borgward B IV
- Sd.Kfz. 302/303a/303b Goliath tracked mine

== Aircraft ==
=== Helicopters ===
- Borgward Kolibri

== See also ==
- List of automobile manufacturers
