= Ford Thunderbird (first generation) =

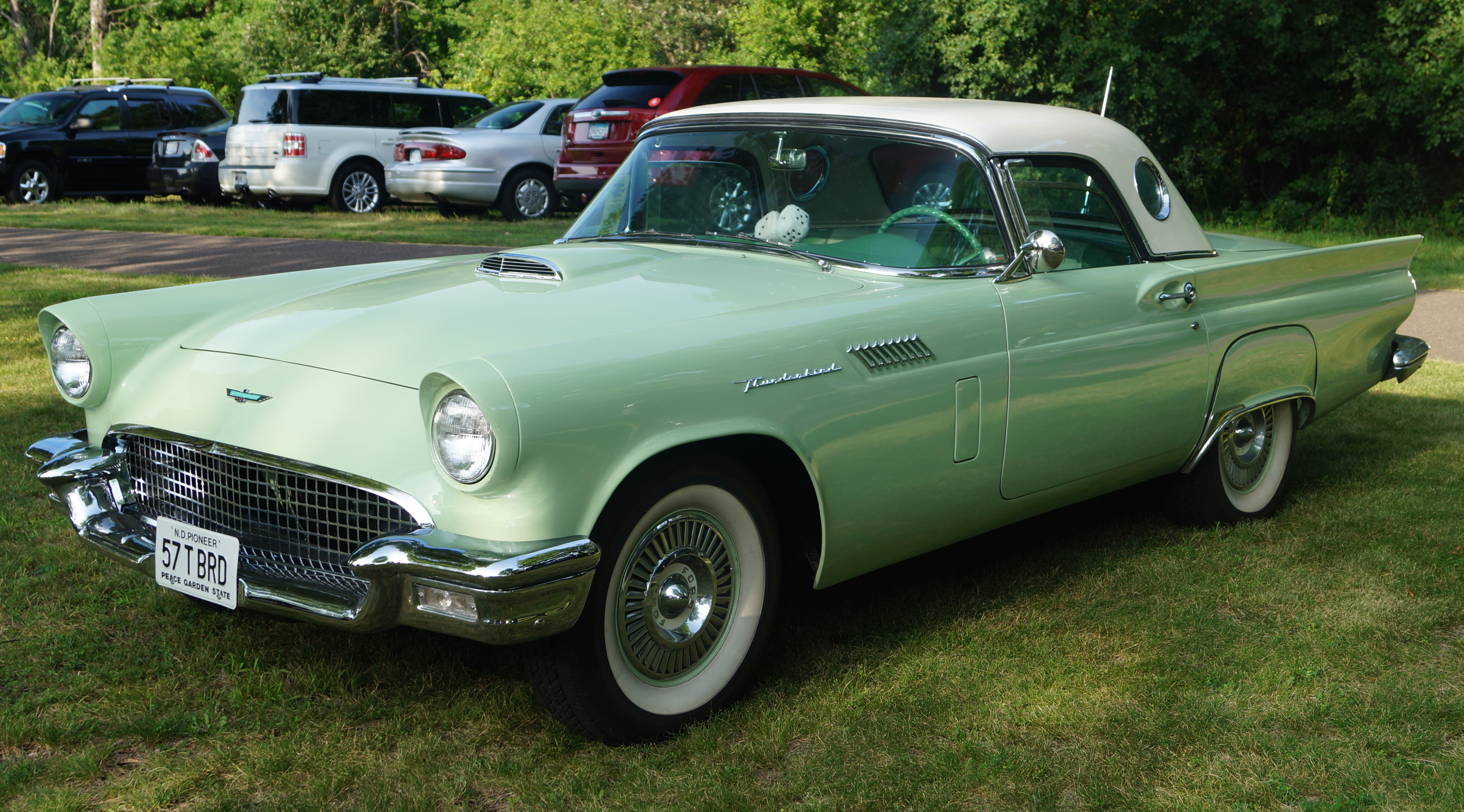
- 1957 Ford Thunderbird

Overview
- Manufacturer: Ford Motor Company
- Production: September 1954–November 1957
- Model years: 1955–1957
- Assembly: United States: Ford River Rouge Complex, Dearborn, Michigan
- Designer: Frank Hershey, Bill Boyer

Body and chassis
- Class: Personal luxury car, Sports car
- Body style: 2-door convertible/roadster
- Layout: Front-engine, rear-wheel-drive
- Chassis: Body-on-frame

Powertrain
- Engine: 292 cu in (4.8 L) Y-block V8; 312 cu in (5.1 L) Y-block V8
- Transmission: 3-speed Fordomatic automatic; 3-speed manual; 3-speed overdrive manual

Dimensions
- Wheelbase: 102 in (2,591 mm)
- Length: 175.3 in (4,453 mm) (1955); 185.2 in (4,704 mm) (1956; 181.4 in (4,608 mm) (1957)
- Width: 70.3 in (1,786 mm)

Chronology
- Predecessor: Ford Vega
- Successor: Ford Thunderbird (second generation)

The first generation of the Ford Thunderbird is a two-seat convertible produced by Ford for the 1955 to the 1957 model years, the first 2-seat Ford since 1938. It was developed in response to the 1953 Motorama display at the New York Auto Show, which showed the Chevrolet Corvette. The Corvette in turn was developed in response to the popularity of European sports cars among Americans.

Dubbed a "a personal car of distinction" by Ford, this appellation was also used by the motoring press at the time. The car built upon the heritage of the bespoke roadsters of the 1930s, yet was constructed largely of existing components, marking the first step toward the evolution of the personal luxury car as a mass market segment in the United States. While lightweight for its era and fitted with a standard V8 engine, the Thunderbird focused more on driver comfort than speed, and was not a direct rival to either the Corvette or European sports cars. The Thunderbird proved more suited to the American market than the Corvette, with sales of 16,155, versus 674 Corvettes in 1955. This remained the only two-seat convertible Thunderbird until the eleventh-generation was unveiled in 2002. The design of this generation of the Ford Thunderbird was the direct inspiration for the German Auto Union 1000 Sp.

== 1955 ==
Ford unveiled the Thunderbird at the Detroit Auto Show on February 20, 1954. The first production car came off the line on September 9, 1954, and went on sale on October 22, 1954, as a 1955 model, and sold briskly; 3,500 orders were placed in the first ten days of sale. While only 10,000 were planned, 16,155 cars were sold with a listed retail price of US$2,944 ($35,383 in 2025 dollars) in 1955.

The Thunderbird came with a removable fiberglass top as standard equipment, with a fabric convertible top as a commonly specified option. The engine was Ford's 292-cubic-inch OHV Y-block V8, producing 193 hp (144 kW) when coupled to the standard, three-speed manual transmission. Claimed fuel mileage was 18 mpg_{‑US} (13 L/100 km; 22 mpg_{‑imp}). Ford-O-Matic equipped cars received a slightly more powerful engine, with 198 hp (148 kW). The exhaust pipes exited through twin bumper guards bolted to the rear bumper.

The car used existing chassis and suspension design and off-the-shelf Ford mechanical components. It was constructed using a body-on-frame technique using a version of the standard Ford design cut-down to a 102-inch wheelbase identical to the Corvette's. The engine was paired either with a Fordomatic automatic or manual overdrive transmissions, and the car featured four-way powered seats and pushbutton interior door handles. Other unique features were a telescoping steering wheel and a tachometer.

A rare domestic two-seater for the era, it was designed to be a brisk luxury tourer and not a sports car, capable of attaining speeds of 100 to 115 mph (161 to 185 km/h) depending on the transmission ordered.

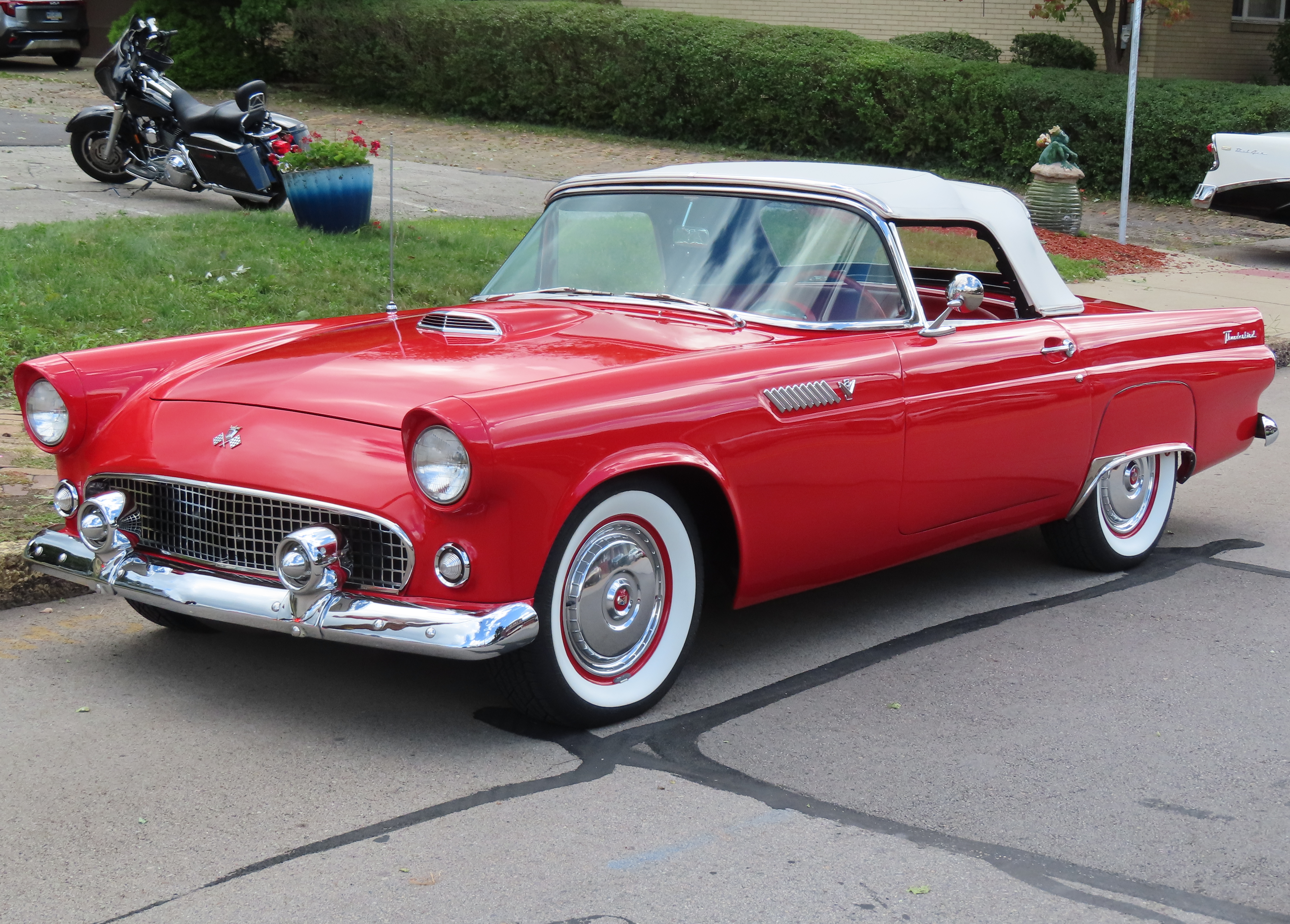
1955 Ford Thunderbird

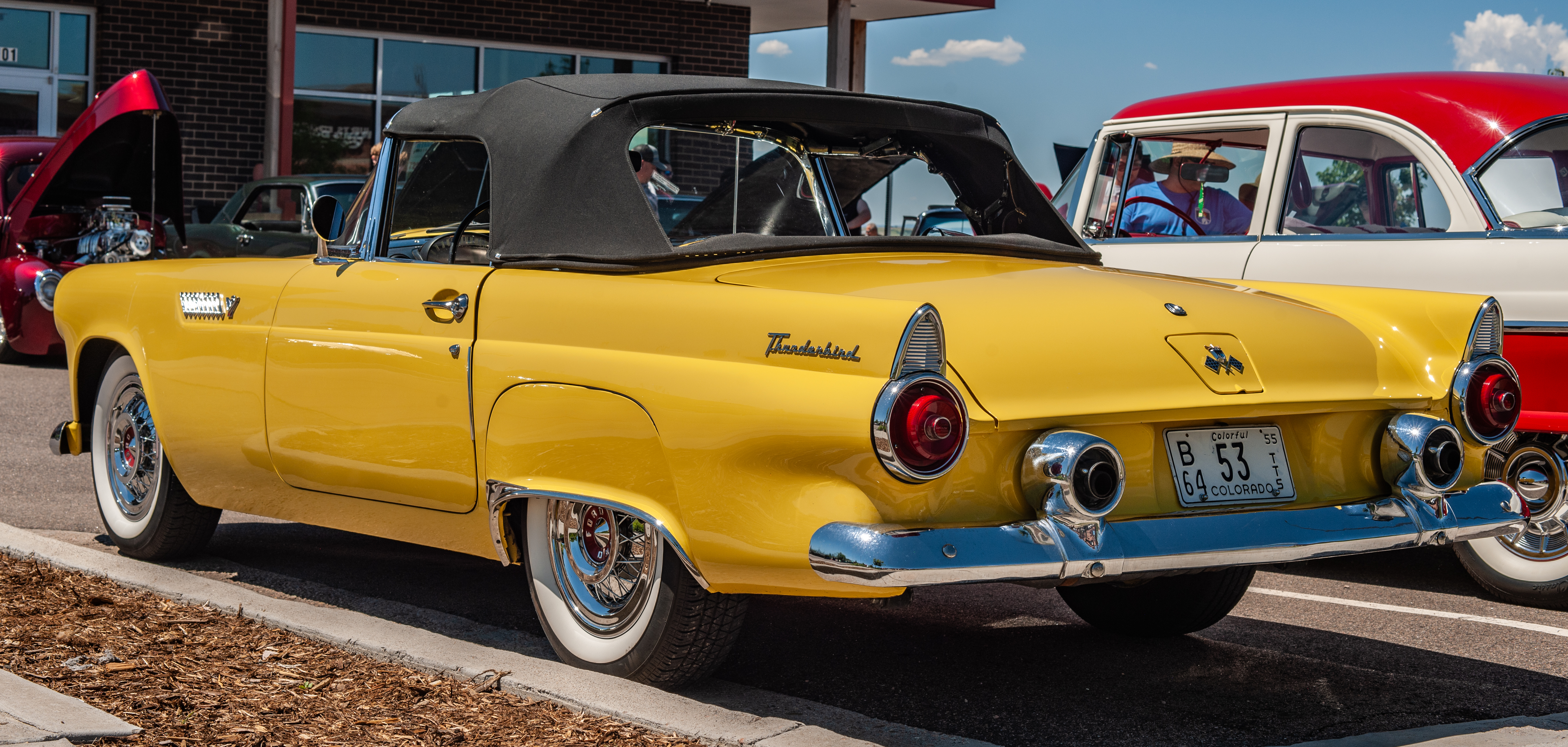
1955 Thunderbird in Goldenrod Yellow

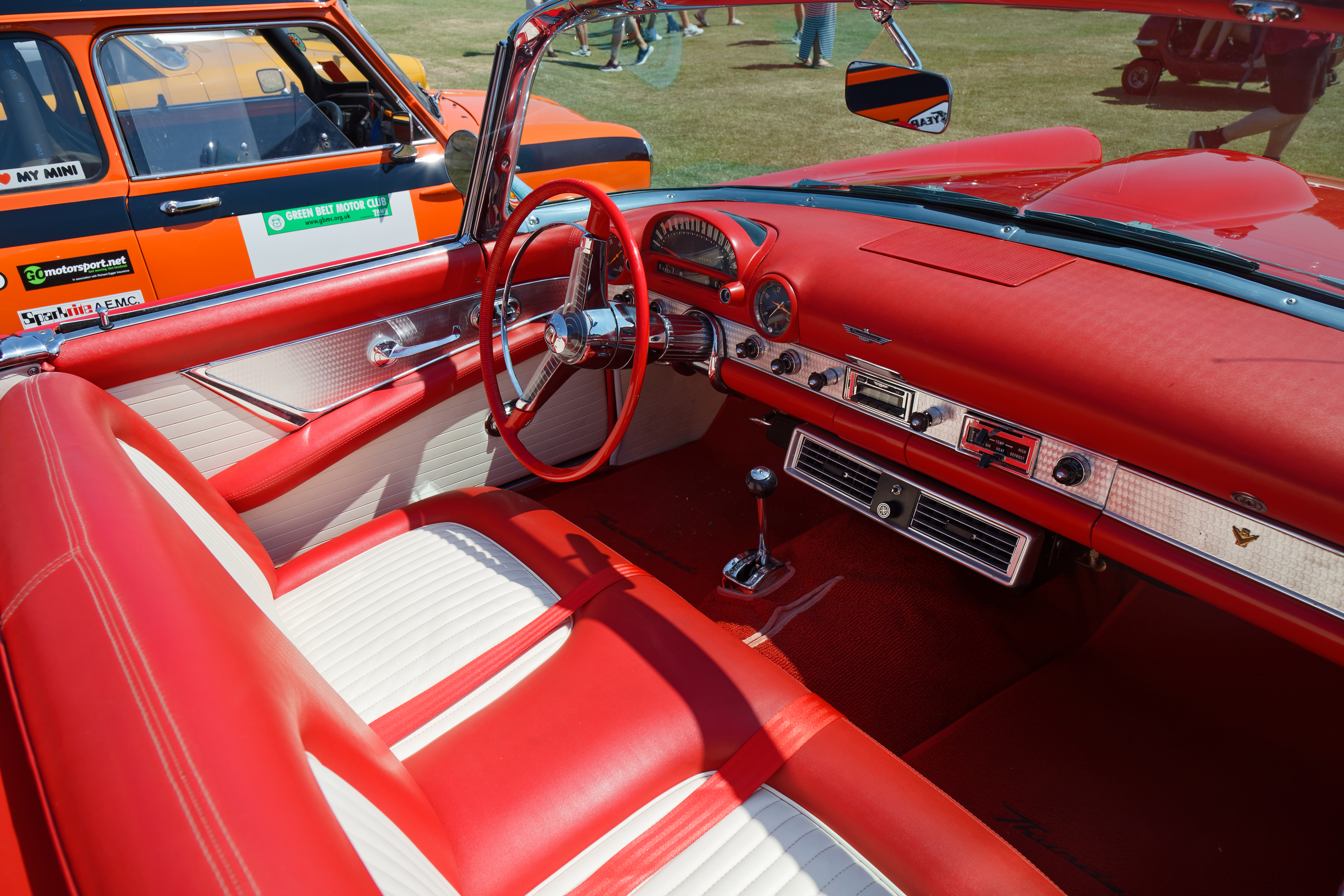
1955 Thunderbird interior

== 1956 ==
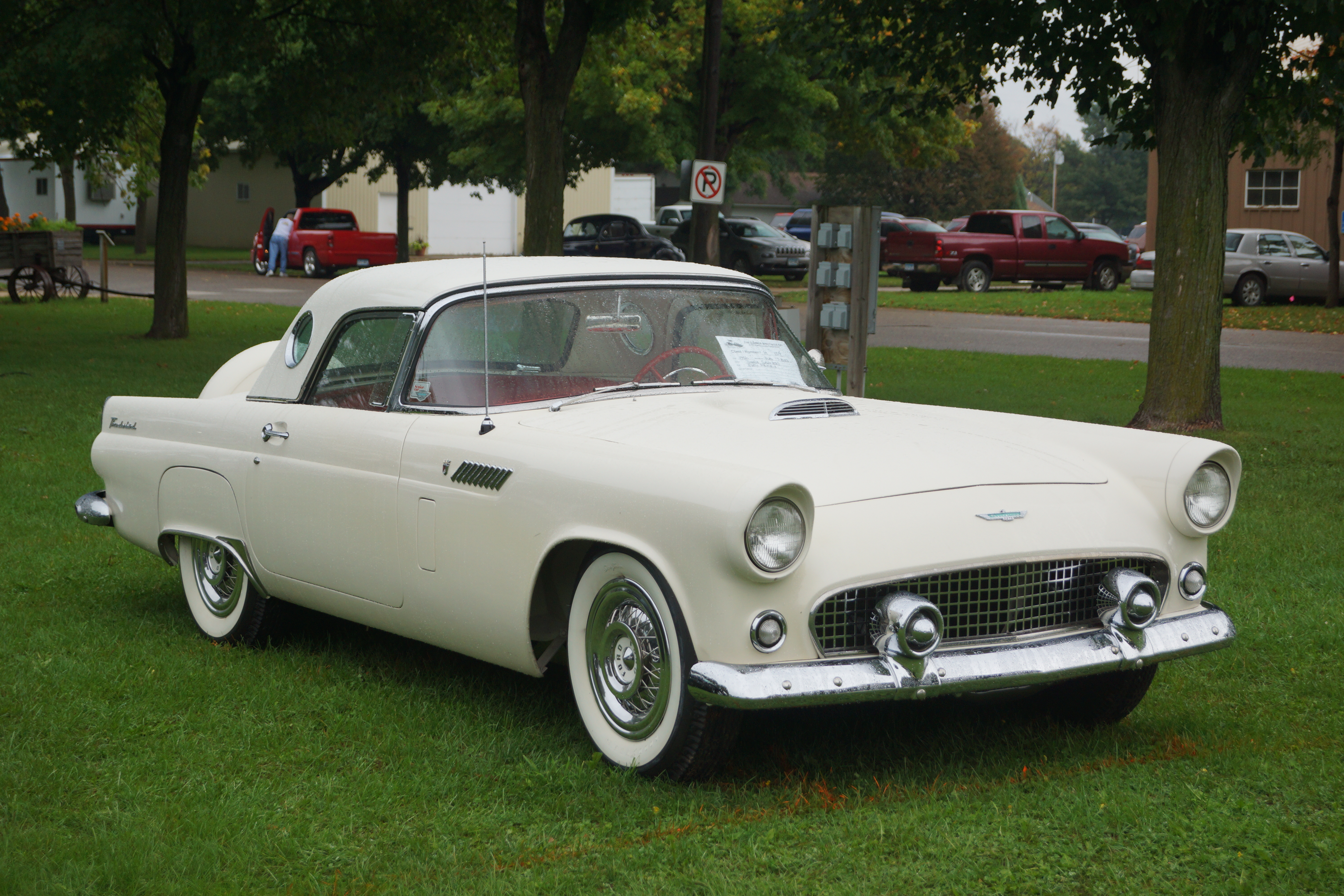
1956 Ford Thunderbird

For the 1956 model year, more trunk space was added, the spare wheel was mounted outside (which helped free up trunk space), the exhaust tips were moved to the ends of the bumper, and air vents were added behind the front wheels to improve cabin ventilation. To improve rear-quarter visibility with the removable hardtop in place, "porthole" windows were available as a no-cost option. A 312 cu in (5.1 L) Y-block V8 was added as an option. Production total for 1956 was 15,631 units, the lowest of all three 2-seater Thunderbird model years.

== 1957 ==
For the 1957 model year, the front bumper was reshaped, the grille and tailfins were made larger, and larger taillights were fitted. The spare wheel moved back inside the trunk, which had been redesigned to allow it to be mounted vertically. The side "Thunderbird" script was moved from the fins to the front fenders. A new option was "Dial-o-Matic" 4-way power seats that would move rearward when the ignition was turned off, to allow easier exit and entry. In addition to the standard 292 and optional 312 engines, higher performance versions of the 312 were offered, including two with a 4-barrel Holley carburetor and McCulloch/Paxton centrifugal superchargers rated at 300 hp (304 PS; 224 kW) at 4,800 rpm with a maximum torque of 439 lb⋅ft (595 N⋅m; 61 kg⋅m) at 2,600 rpm; and 340 hp (345 PS; 254 kW), respectively. 1957 sales were 21,380, including three extra months of production because the 1958 models were late. The 1957 Thunderbird was the last two-seater Ford sold until the release of the 1982 Ford EXP.

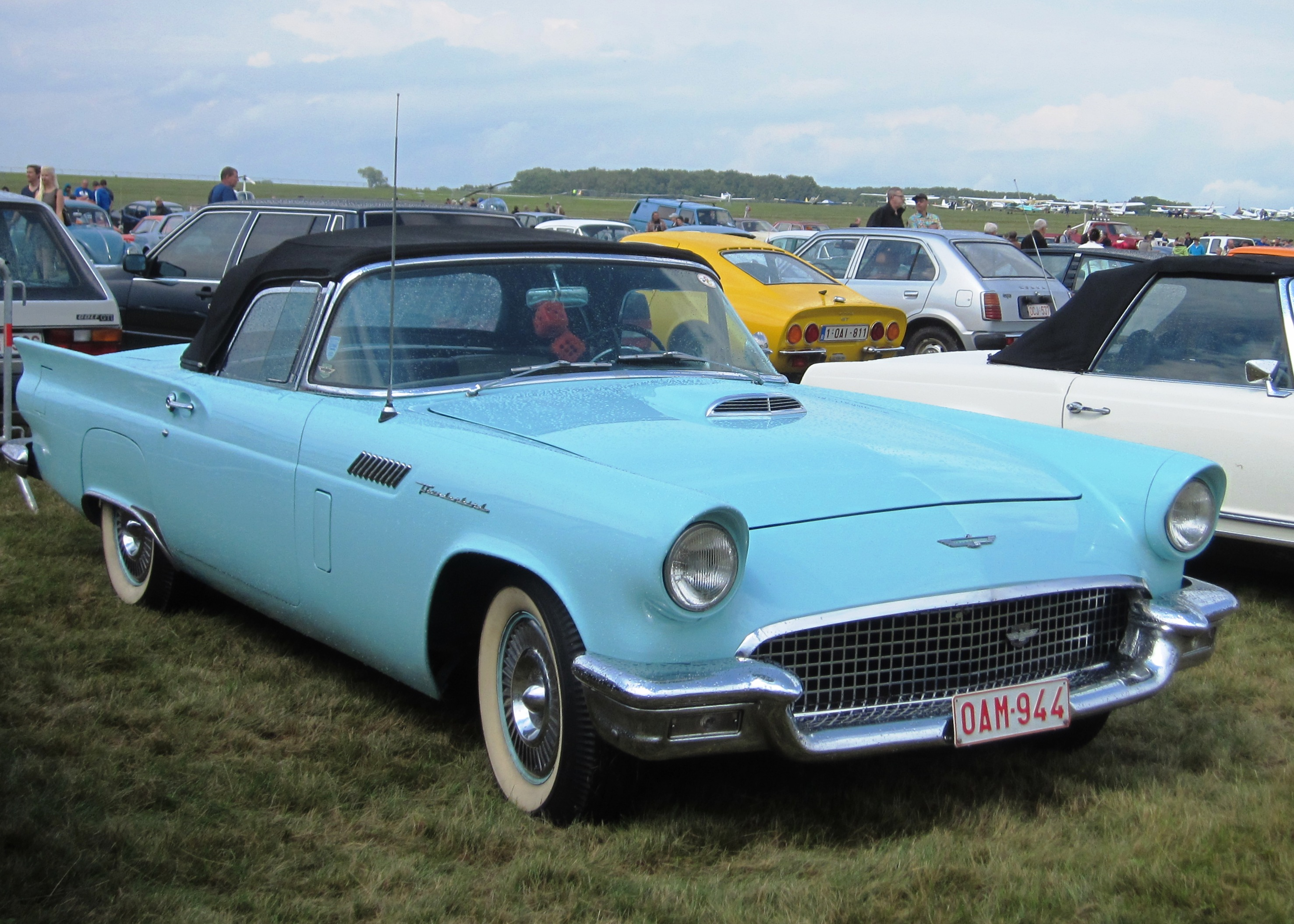
1957 Ford Thunderbird

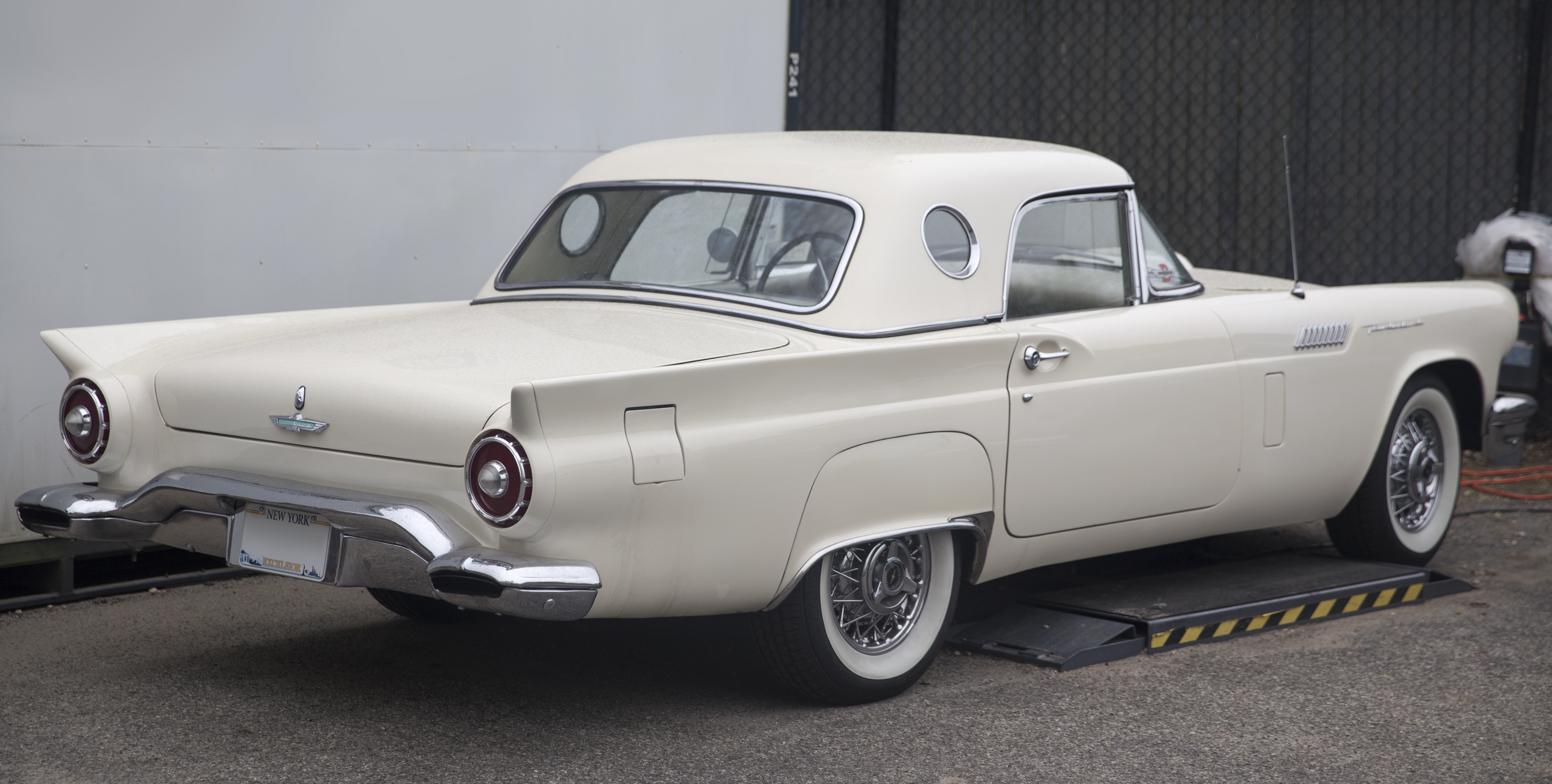
The rear view, showing the larger tailfins and lights

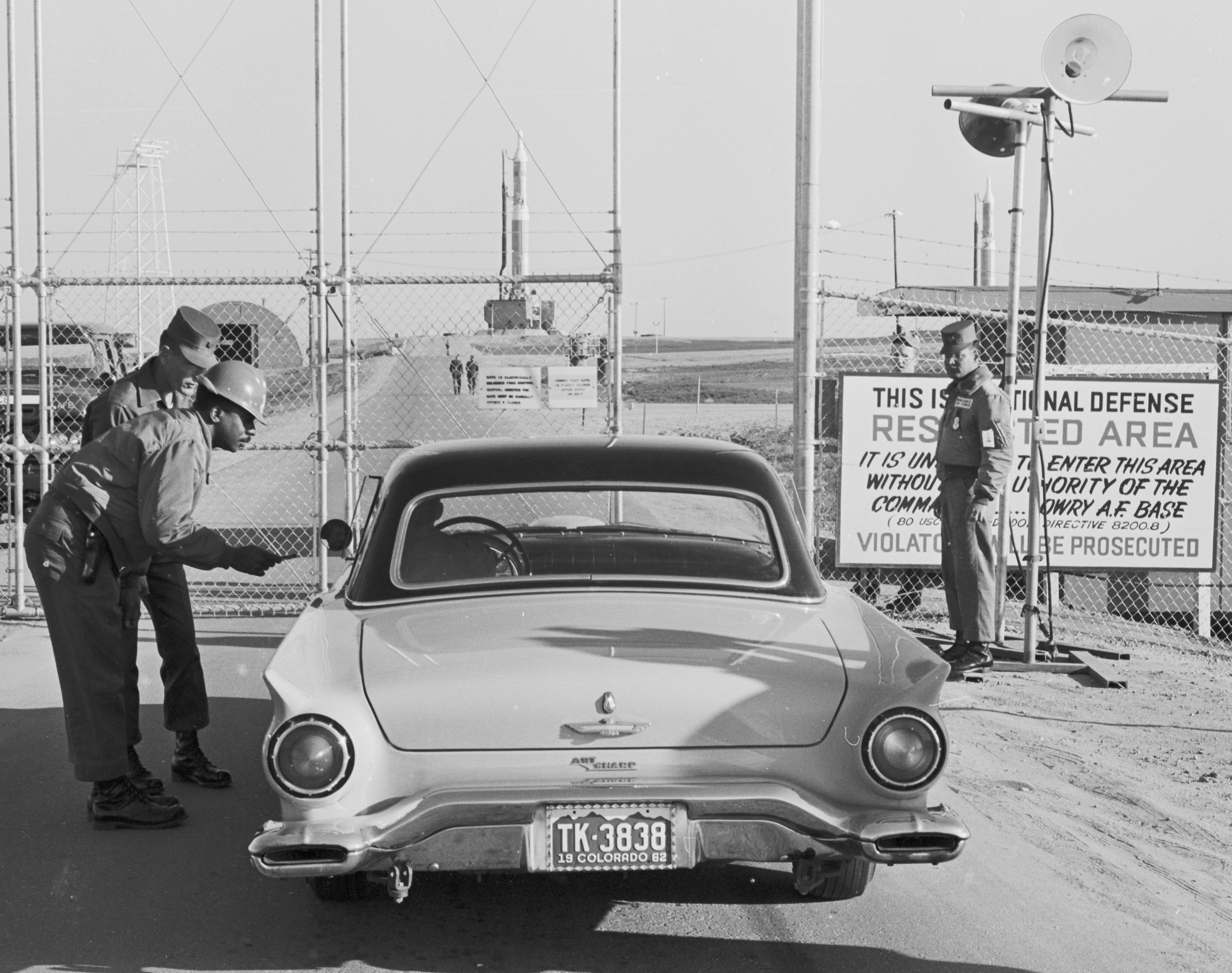
A 1957 Thunderbird entering Lowry Air Force Base in 1962

A '57 T-Bird in black

== Production totals ==
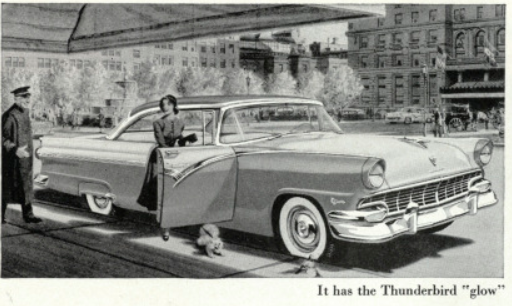
Advertisement for the 1956 Ford Fairlane, mentioning a "Thunderbird glow"

Year	Production
1955	16,155
1956	15,631
1957	21,380
Total	53,166
