= Auto Union 1000 =

Car model

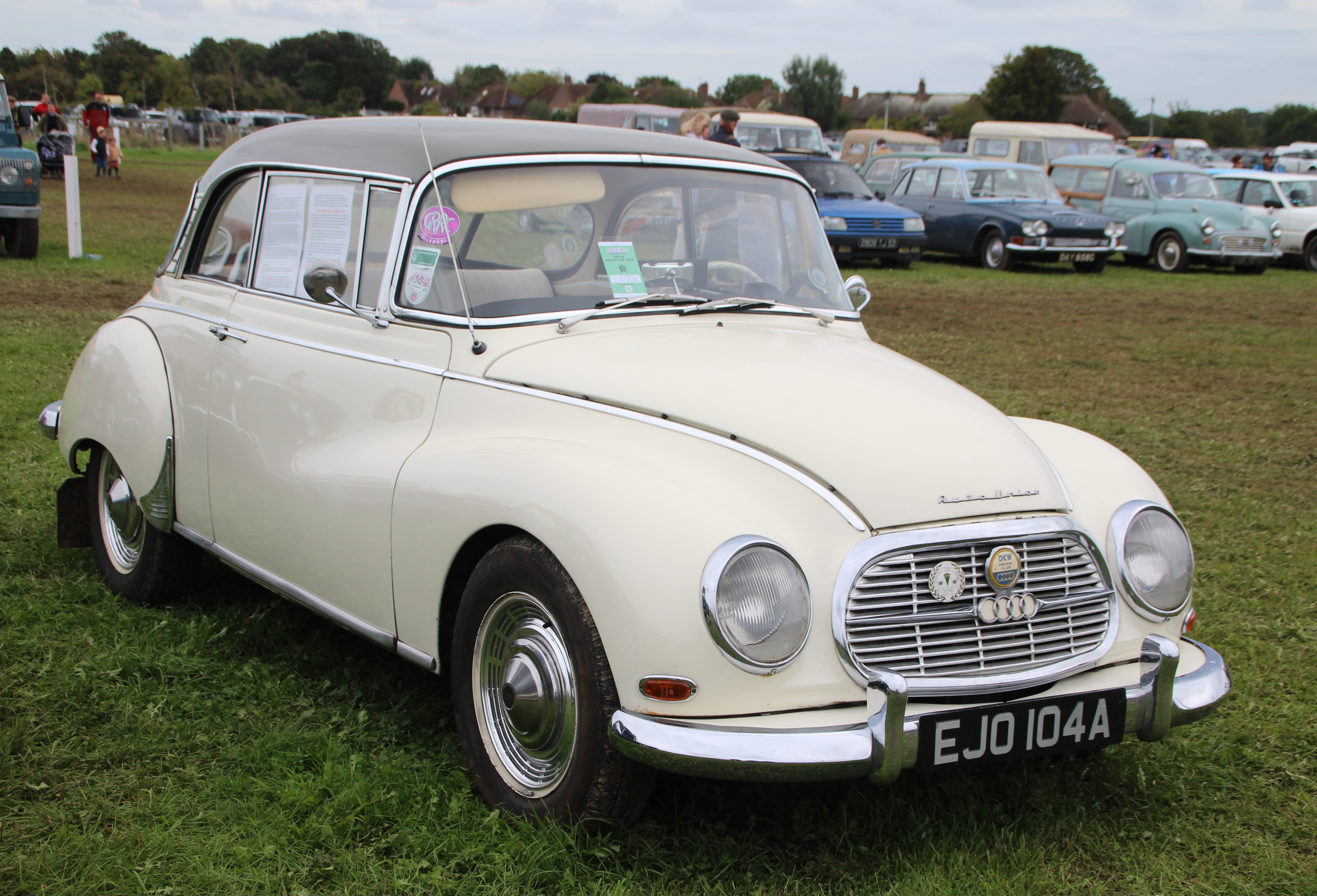
- 1963 Auto Union 1000S Coupé

Overview
- Manufacturer: Auto Union
- Production: 1958–1963 (Saloon); 171,008 built 1959–1965 (Sport) ca. 6,640 built 1960–1969 (Argentina)
- Assembly: West Germany: Düsseldorf; West Germany: Ingolstadt; Argentina: Sauce Viejo (IASFSA)

Body and chassis
- Class: Compact / Small family car (C)
- Body style: 2/4-door saloon 2-door coupé 3-door estate
- Layout: FF layout

Powertrain
- Engine: 981 cc two-stroke I3
- Transmission: 4-speed manual

Dimensions
- Wheelbase: 2,350 mm (93 in) (2-door); 2,450 mm (96 in) (4-door)
- Length: 4,170 mm (164 in); 4,325 mm (170.3 in) according to version
- Width: 1,727 mm (68.0 in)
- Height: 1,486 mm (58.5 in)
- Curb weight: 950 kg (2,090 lb) approx

Chronology
- Predecessor: DKW 3=6
- Successor: DKW F102

The Auto Union 1000 is a luxury compact front-wheel drive automobile manufactured by Auto Union GmbH between 1958 and 1965. It was the first (and in many markets the last) model branded as an Auto Union by the manufacturer since the 1930s; it replaced the DKW 3=6, although the latter continued in production until the end of 1959. The two cars were broadly similar, but the new car had its two-stroke engine enlarged to 981 cc yielding a 10% - 37% (depending on model) power increase.

== The development of the model ==
The Auto Union 1000 was an evolution of the earlier DKW F93, F94 and F94U models of the 3=6 series.

Apart from the enlarged engine capacity, which now provided 44 PS (32 kW; 43 hp) in the base model, the 1000 featured the old four-ring Auto Union badge across the grille along with the Auto Union name above it, in place of the DKW badge that had adorned the nose of the earlier models, as well as a smooth boot (trunk) lid.

For the European market there were three distinct series of the 1000/1000S; (not including the 1000SP or 1000 engined DKW Munga);

The first series was known as the "model 58" or AU1000/58, which was available as the 1000 Coupe de luxe only with the 44 PS engine. This model was available for 1958/59 only and was released in late 1957.

The second series was known as the "model 60" or AU1000/60 - which, in two door form was the first model to feature the "panoramic" windscreen.

The third and final series was known as the "model 62" or AU1000/62, which was an improved version of the "model 60" - featuring front disc brakes, Lubrimat, wider track rear axle, larger boot and other refinements.

The first car of the "model 60" line was a 1000S Coupe chassis number 6820000001, completed at Düsseldorf on 27 July 1959. There were 25 pre-production cars built. The first production 1000/1000S was chassis number 6820000026. Over time the "model 60" 1000 series gained a four-door and Universal in the range, all produced at Düsseldorf. Production of all "model 60" second series cars was switched to the third series "model 62" on 29 September 1961.

Production of the third series of 1000/1000S was gradually closed from late 1962. The final 1000 Universal was completed on 31 October 1962, and the final 1000S four door on 13 November, in both cases at Ingolstadt. The details of the final European 1000S assembled are unknown, as the final batch of production contained CKD and SKD (Completely Knocked Down and Semi Knocked Down) kits, which were assembled later, outside Germany. The final European 1000/1000S manufactured (note, not assembled) though, was a 1000S Coupe de Luxe chassis number 6820146387.

== Body options ==
In addition to the two- and four-door saloons, a "pillarless" Coupe shared the profile of the saloons apart from the absence of any fixed B pillar. A three-door station wagon version was also offered (essentially, an updated DKW F94U), now branded as the 1000 Universal, between 1959 and 1962 (1959/60/61 only for right hand drive). For the new decade, the coupe and four door was renamed Auto Union 1000S. In August 1959, an eye-catching wrap-around windscreen with vertical strip speedometer was introduced on the two door models of the "model 60" series (AU1000 limousine, AU1000 Coupe and AU1000S Coupe). Neither the windscreen nor the name changes entirely concealed the fact that at a time when competitor designs employed the modern ponton, three-box form, this Auto Union's body along with most of its technical features descended directly from that of the Zwickau-developed DKW F9 prototype of 1938. Fortunately in 1938, the front-wheel drive DKW design had been an innovative one.

Appearing in 1958 was the Auto Union 1000 Sp, a low-slung, two-seater sports car that was produced for Auto Union by the Stuttgart coach builders, Baur. The fixed-head version was joined in 1961 by a cabriolet. Adorned with tail fins, the stylish, modern look of the car gave rise to the "baby Thunderbird" (schmalspur Thunderbird) soubriquet in the press, and belied the fact that it was, under the skin, merely an Auto Union 1000, albeit one with an increased compression ratio and a claimed maximum of 55 PS (40 kW; 54 hp) at its disposal. The 1000 Sp was lower, but not (assuming only two people were in the car) significantly lighter than the standard-bodied saloon; a claimed maximum speed of 140 km/h (87 mph), nevertheless, put its performance at the top of the range. It proved to be the last open-top car produced by the company until the Audi 80 cabriolet in 1994.

== Motorsport success ==
The model's worldwide motorsport success in the late 1950s and early 1960s, where several outright victories, such as the 1959 Acropolis Rally (Wolfgang Levy, Hans Wenscher), South African National Rally Championship in 1961, 1962 and 1963 (Reinhard Muhl and Pieter Muhl; 1963 with Jan Hettema) and many others, brought it fame along with class wins in many more events such the 1960 Monte Carlo Rally.

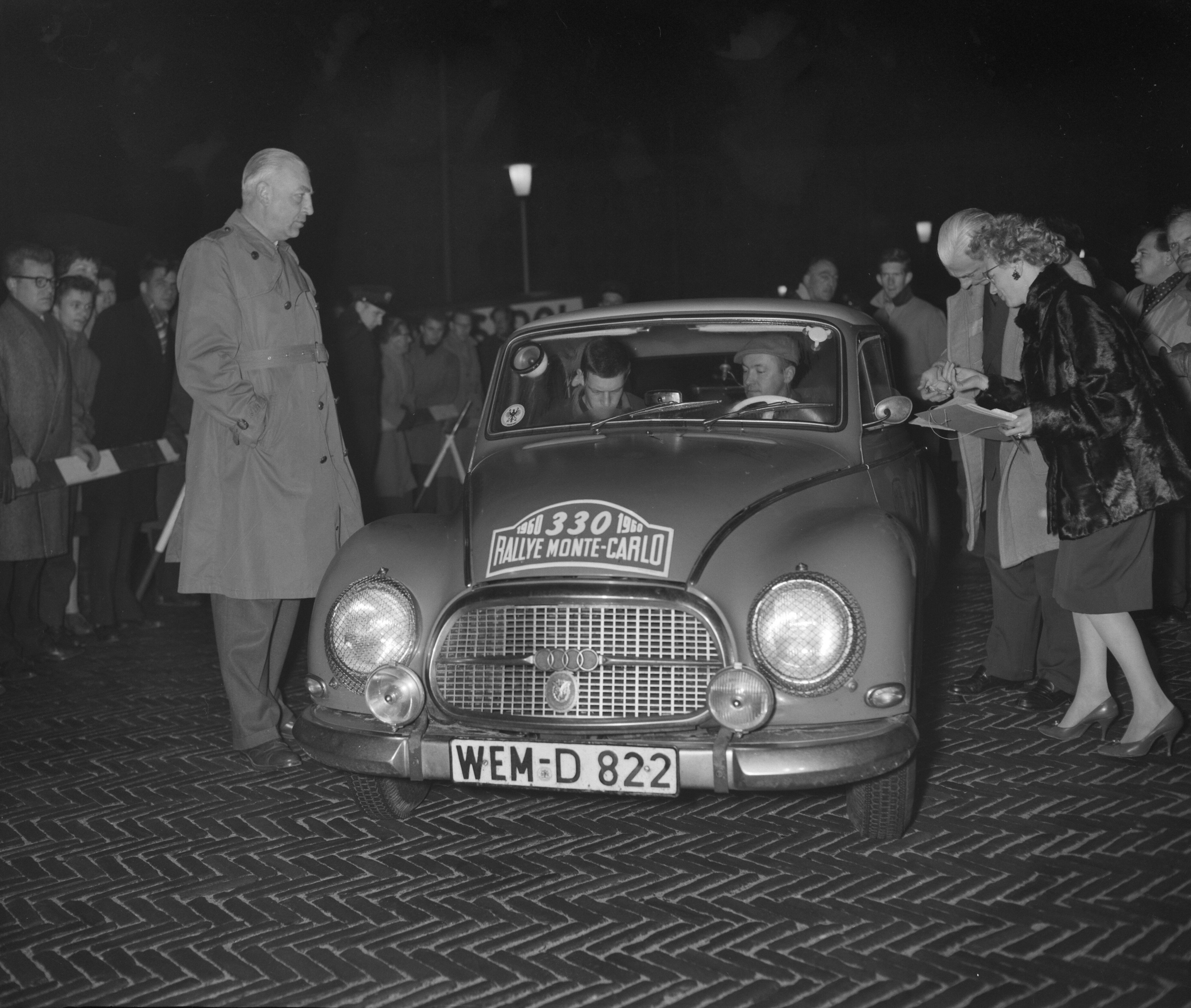
Auto Union 1000 on the 1960 Monte Carlo Rally

These cars remained competing at motorsport events into the 1970s in such countries as Sri Lanka, Brazil and South Africa, where they were still rallied with enthusiasm.

== Auto Union in Argentina ==
In Argentina, the 1000 was manufactured under license by Industrias Automotriz de Santa Fe (IASF) between 1960 and 1969, in the city of Sauce Viejo, Santa Fe. The lineup consisted of the two- and four-door sedans, the three-door Universal estate (station wagon), and the Carrozzeria Fissore-designed Coupé and Spyder "1000 SE" on the basis of German 1000 Sp. These were more elegant and departed from the visual appearance of the Ford Thunderbird, the "Fissore Coupé" stood out with one-piece front bumpers and longer wrap-around bumpers in back, an alternate roof line, side louvers in the front fenders between the front wheel cut outs, and doors adorned with chrome strips and an elegantly appointed interior. Only limited numbers of the coupé were built and are highly sought out by collectors. Licensed productions of the coupés and Spyder were also carried out in Spain.

The Coupé Fissore had many famous owners (Julio Sosa., César Luis Menotti, and others). Other important models were the Auto Union 1000S (21,797 Sedán made until 1969), the Auto Union Combi/Pick-up, and the Auto Union 1000 Universal S (6,396 made until 1969, too). The last version of the Auto Union Combi/Pick-up launched in 1969 but only remained on sale for a few months. Afterwards, IME used the cabs for this model.

Auto Union 1000S cars have, more recently, featured prominently in Argentine films, such as The Games Maker and The German Doctor (Wakolda).

== Performance ==
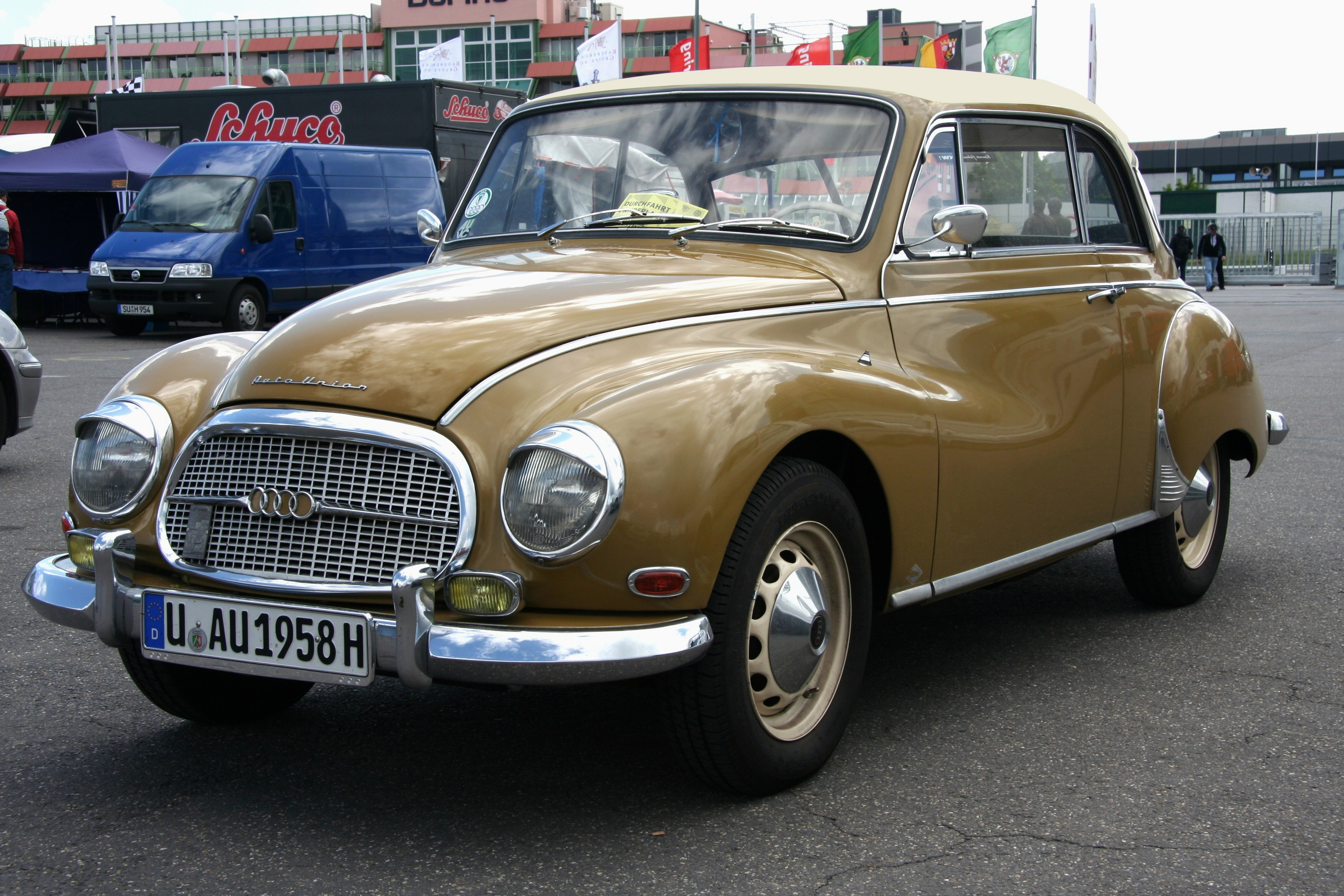
1958/59 Auto Union 1000 Coupe de Luxe

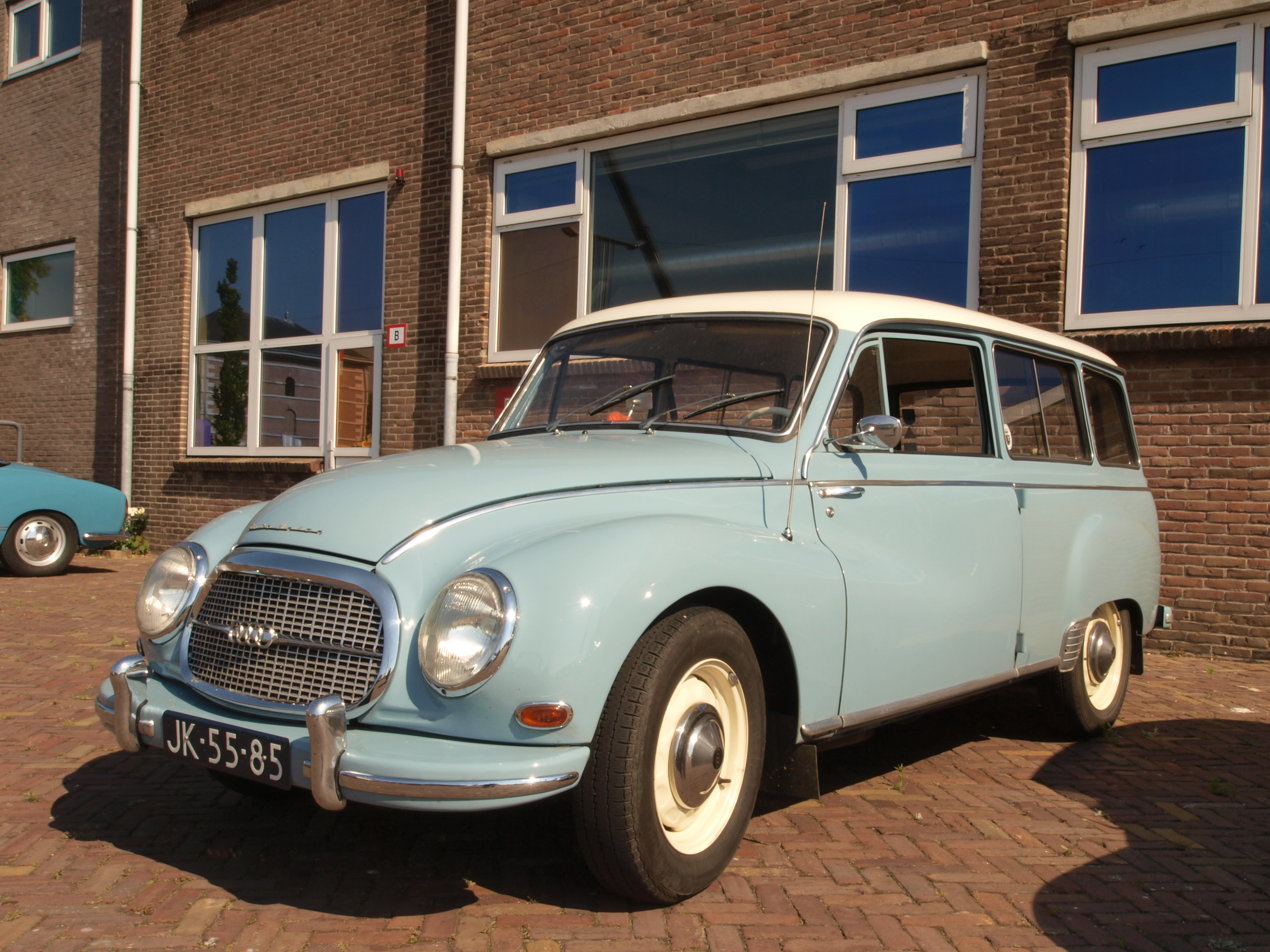
1960/61 Auto Union 1000 Universal

Bill Boddy, the editor of the British magazine Motor Sport, wrote in 1960 of the 1000S Coupe; "The manner in which this roomy 980-c.c. saloon leaves larger cars as its driver weaves through the traffic, making full use of the excellent acceleration, is well calculated to captivate enthusiasts, particularly those who esteem unorthodox cars and the two-cycle power unit."

The August 1960 edition of the South African "CAR" magazine tested the 1000S Coupé, recording a top speed of 132 km/h (82 mph) and a fuel consumption of 33.5 miles per imperial gallon (8.4 L/100 km; 27.9 mpg_{‑US}).

A 1000S Coupé was tested by the British The Motor magazine in 1960 and had a top speed of 80.9 mph (130.2 km/h) and could accelerate from 0–60 mph (97 km/h) in 23.6 seconds. A fuel consumption of 31.5 miles per imperial gallon (9.0 L/100 km; 26.2 mpg_{‑US}) was recorded. The test car cost £1259 including taxes on the UK market. In the same year, the much larger Austin Westminster retailed for only £1148 in the UK, reflecting, in particular, the extent to which British automakers were still protected by import tariffs in their home market.

== Technical specification and driving impressions ==
The Auto Union's 981-cc two-stroke three-cylinder engine was available in various states of tune. For 1960 models, power in the 1000S was 50 PS (37 kW; 49 hp), with 44 PS available in the 1000, and 55 PS available for the 1000SP. Power was delivered via a four-speed manual gearbox, controlled using a column-mounted lever - with optional Saxomat automatic clutch. The electrical system was six-volt.

The suspension arrangement was carried over unchanged from the earlier DKW 3=6, so handling also followed the surefooted behaviour of the earlier model.

Sports Cars Illustrated magazine January 1959 edition wrote of the 1000 Coupe de luxe:

"Probably the most striking impression of the AU1000 is its extraordinarily high cornering power. It took us a while to learn to keep our foot flat on the floor when cornering at speeds so high that a more conventional car would swap ends. On a loose gravel surface the stability and "sticktion" of the DKW borders on the incredible and we began to understand the reasons why and how these cars have enjoyed such tremendous success in international rallies. One has the impression that a driver can pound the car without mercy, flog it for all its worth and it will come back for more. The Auto Union 1000 is a rugged automobile, its beefy leaf springs and solid frame as well as the unburstable 980cc engine, all substantiating this impression."

The South African "CAR" magazine wrote in its August 1960 edition;

"From what we have stated and we refer particularly to the positions of the gears, front-wheel drive, the free-wheel unit and the need for frequent changes of the gears it is obvious that the Auto Union takes some getting used to before its full worth is appreciated. This process, however, in the lives of members of a test team who not unnaturally tend to become somewhat blasé about motor cars and the claims made in respect of motor cars - made for exceedingly pleasant motoring when the Auto Union came our way. At the end of our temporary ownership, we found ourselves enjoying to the full the tractive advantages of front-wheel drive and the ability of the Auto Union to corner in complete safety under power. Then too, the car's ability to cruise without effort at higher-than-normal speeds in silence could be appreciated to the full."

And aside from purely sporting characteristics, the car over bad roads provided an extraordinarily comfortable ride under full load. We were also able to take the 1000S over considerable stretches of badly corrugated farm surfaces without distress to elderly passengers; the car does not pitch unduly and stability under all conditions was of high order".

In 1961 (for the 1962 models), the so-called Clean Oil Regulator “Frischölautomatik” or "Lubrimat" was introduced, a system incorporating a separate oil tank and pump to dispense the oil, which in a two-stroke engine is mixed with the fuel ahead of combustion. The stated purpose was to reduce the characteristic blue smoke emission for which the car was known. This was to be achieved by ensuring that oil was introduced in exactly the correct 1:40 proportion to the fuel, and the device was advertised as a way to improve engine longevity. The timing of this innovation proved unfortunate as the winter of 1962-63 was an exceptionally cold one in Europe. The Auto Union 1000 model experienced an unexpected increase in crankshaft damage because the oil, its viscosity affected by the cold weather, was unable to flow freely through the narrow feeder pipe in the carburettor. The USA-born Dr William Werner (the Technical Director of Auto Union) together with the Auto Union chief designer, Oskar Siebler, had the idea of the unique two stroke oiling system "Lubrimat" while drinking their coffee in the Alpine Franzenshöhe cafe - on 17 March 1959. In their words, whereas the two stroke engine was a remarkable power unit, "its malodorous blue-smoky smell" offended people. The Lubrimat was intended to fix this. This invention, while noteworthy at the time, ultimately hastened the death of two stroke automotive engines in the world outside Eastern Europe. It was touted as "Sensation at the International Automobile Exhibition 1961". After that cup of coffee - Werner and Siebler filed a patent for the Lubrimat in April 1959.

== Production and sales ==
The Düsseldorf plant (in the old Rheinmetall - Borsig factory) produced most of the 171,008 Auto Union 1000 cars built during the six-year model run. The pretty 1000 SP sports version continued in production for another two years, until 1965, notching up sales of 5,000 for the hard-top version and 1,640 for the cabriolet. The production of the car was extensively shown in the 1960 film "Träume, die Sie kaufen können".

The car was sold worldwide and was popular in markets where its characteristics suited the local conditions well. Export sales were especially strong in Africa and the car was well regarded for its robust and reliable construction. In countries where its sporting heritage is especially strong, such as South Africa, the car has since acquired a legendary status. In 2012, the South African artist Steve Hofmeyr released a song, "DKW" which, taking in the Auto Union 1000, expressed a nostalgia for the car as a representation of solidity and reliability.

Import tariffs made the Auto Union 1000 a costly car in certain markets, and sales were slow in countries where the 1960s "Buy British" campaigns were effective. In New Zealand, for example, a 1960 Auto Union 1000S could be bought from Crosbie Motors in Invercargill for £1578 at a time when larger cars were selling for significantly less.

The Auto Union 1000 also enjoyed much publicity from being prominently featured in European films of the day, such as the German musical comedy Hula-Hopp, Conny, the German Comedy Robert and Bertram and the Swedish film Mannekäng i rött. In 1970, well after the car's production ended, an Auto Union 1000S featured as the star in the German comedy film Das kann doch unsren Willi nicht erschüttern.

As with its predecessor, the DKW 3=6, the Auto Union 1000 enjoyed the attention of a number of famous owners, such as the famous aviator, Elly Beinhorn (her white and red 1958 Auto Union 1000 Coupe de luxe was named "Alwine VIII"), Hollywood film maker Billy Wilder (1000SP), Big band bandleader Max Greger (1000SP), Graf von Brandenstein-Zeppelin (1000SP) and German fashion designer Katja Nieborg (1000S Coupe).

== The end of production ==
In 1963, the Auto Union 1000 gave way in Europe to its successor, the contemporary-looking DKW F102 - the last model to wear either the Auto Union or DKW badges before the company was acquired by Volkswagen and the dormant Audi brand was resurrected. The 1000 was also the last Auto Union/DKW model to be produced at the Düsseldorf factory before production was moved to the company's new plant in Ingolstadt; the old factory was sold to Auto Union's then parent company Daimler-Benz to be converted to a Mercedes truck and van assembly plant.

The older-model DKW 3=6 continued in production in a slightly modified form in Brazil until 1967, but it was produced without modification in Santa Fe, Argentina, until late 1969, with about 30,000 cars manufactured.

== Present day – collectors and enthusiasts ==
In countries such as Brazil and South Africa, a significant number of Auto Union 1000 cars were still in everyday use in the early 2020s . Additionally, there are enthusiast clubs worldwide. These are served by a number of parts specialists in Europe and South America. The largest club is the Auto Union Veteranen Club e.V. (AUVC)

The AUVC normally coordinates an annual "Treffen" of DKW and Auto Union cars in Europe, whereas in South America, a large annual gathering of these cars, the "Blue Cloud" occurs every August in Brazil at Poços de Caldas.

== Gallery ==
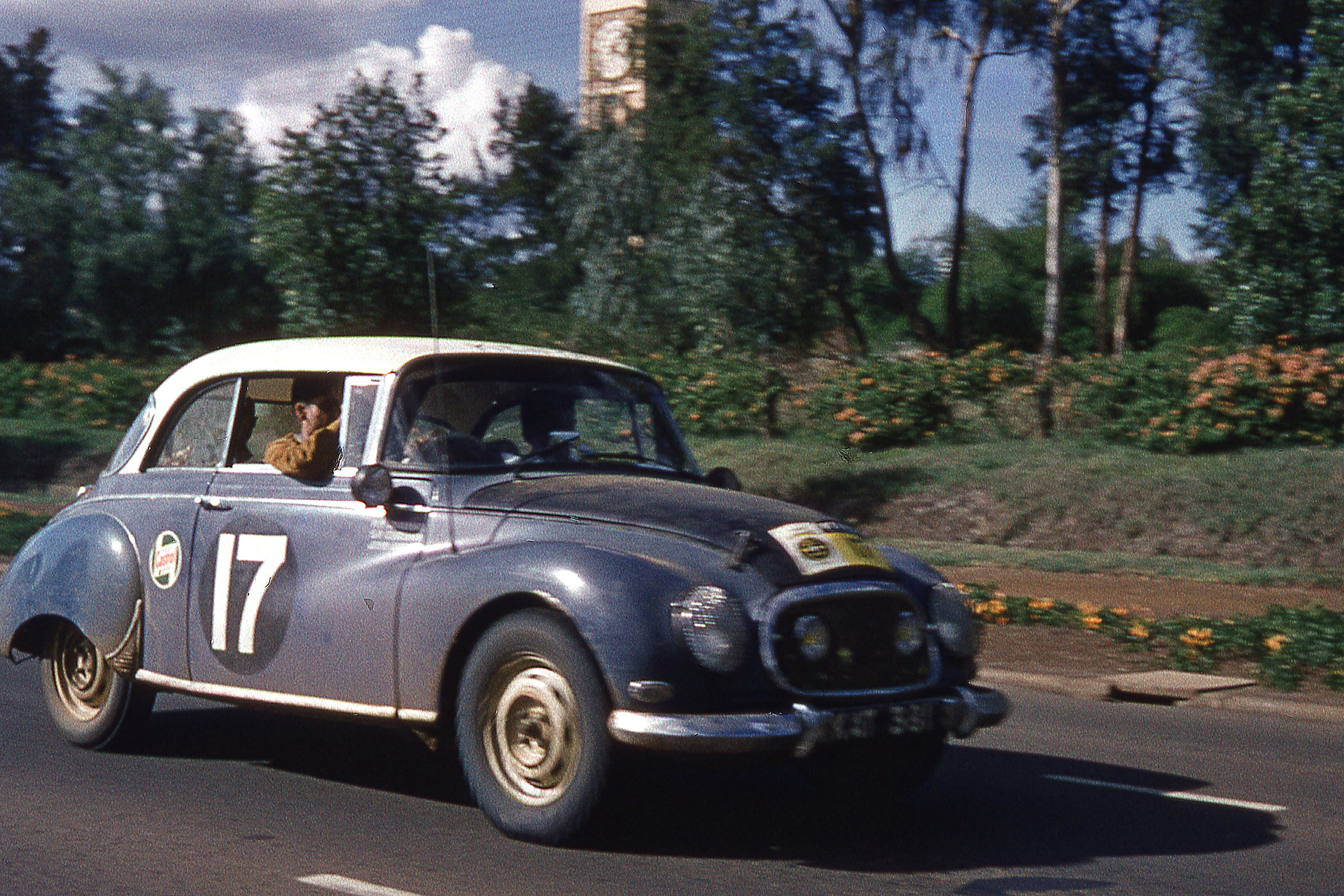
1960 Auto Union 1000S Coupé on the 1962 East African Safari Rally

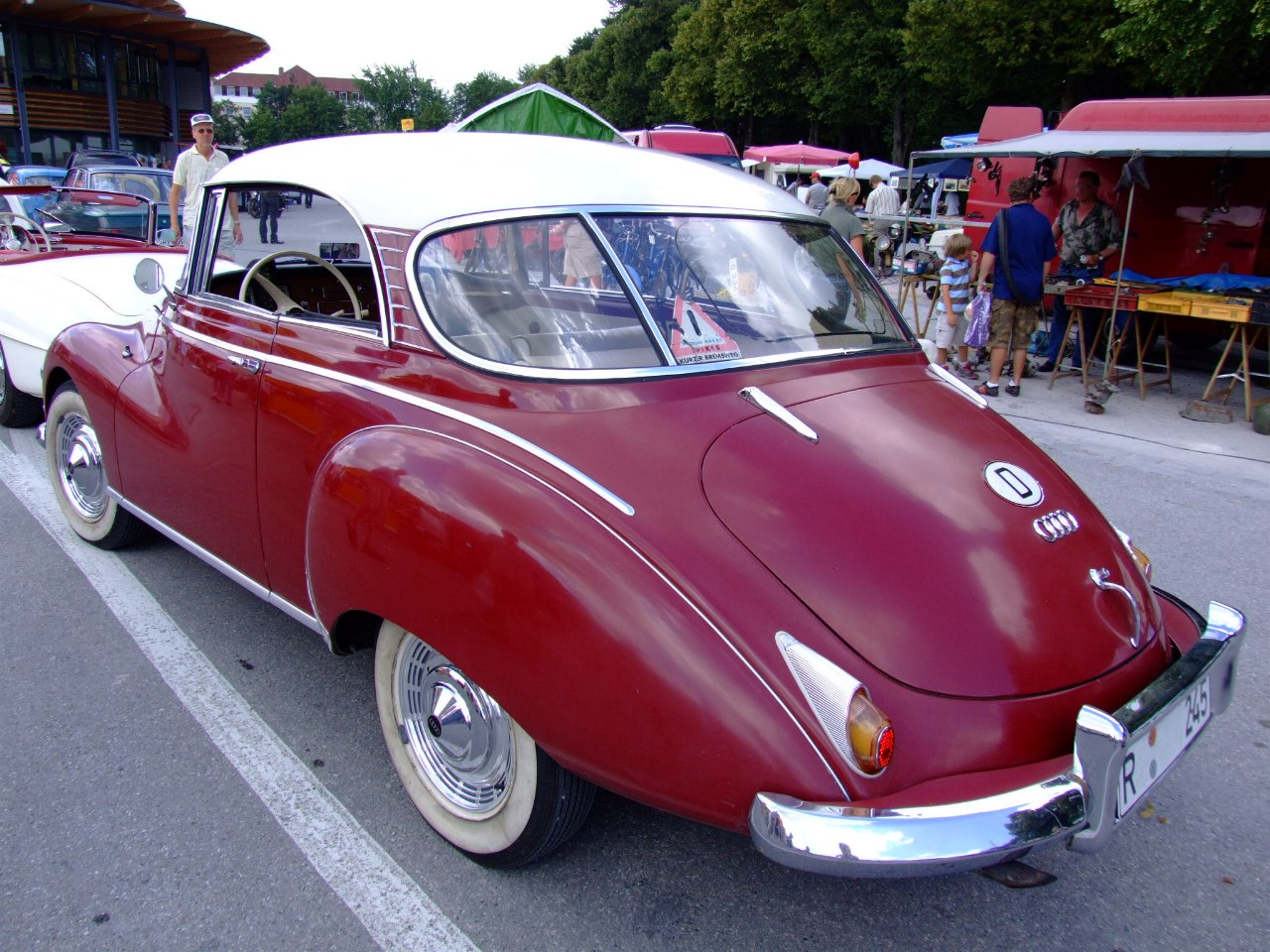
Auto Union 1000 S de Luxe

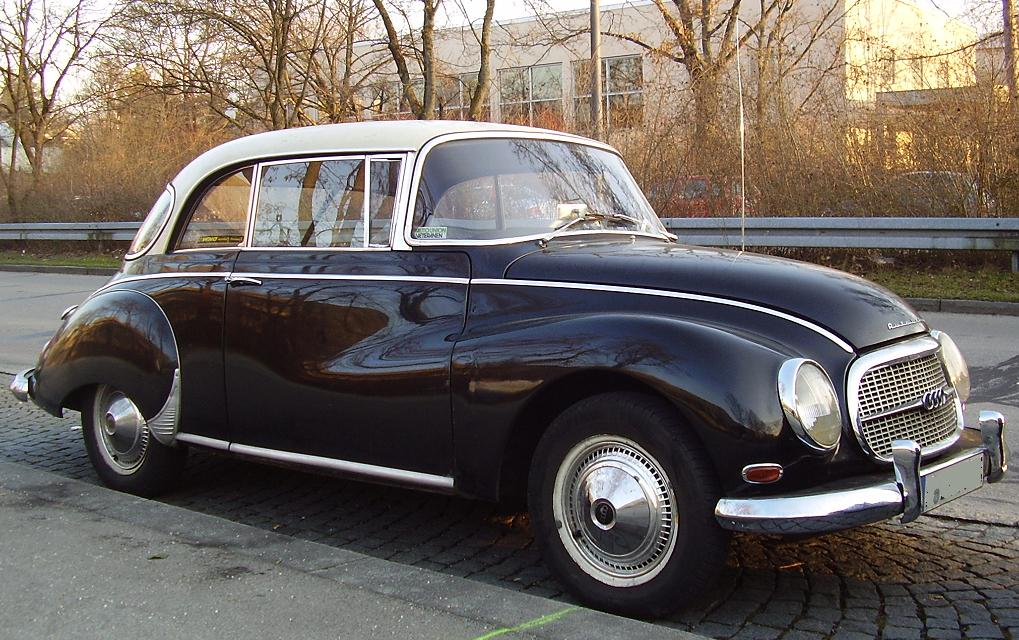
Auto Union 1000 pillarless coupé post facelift

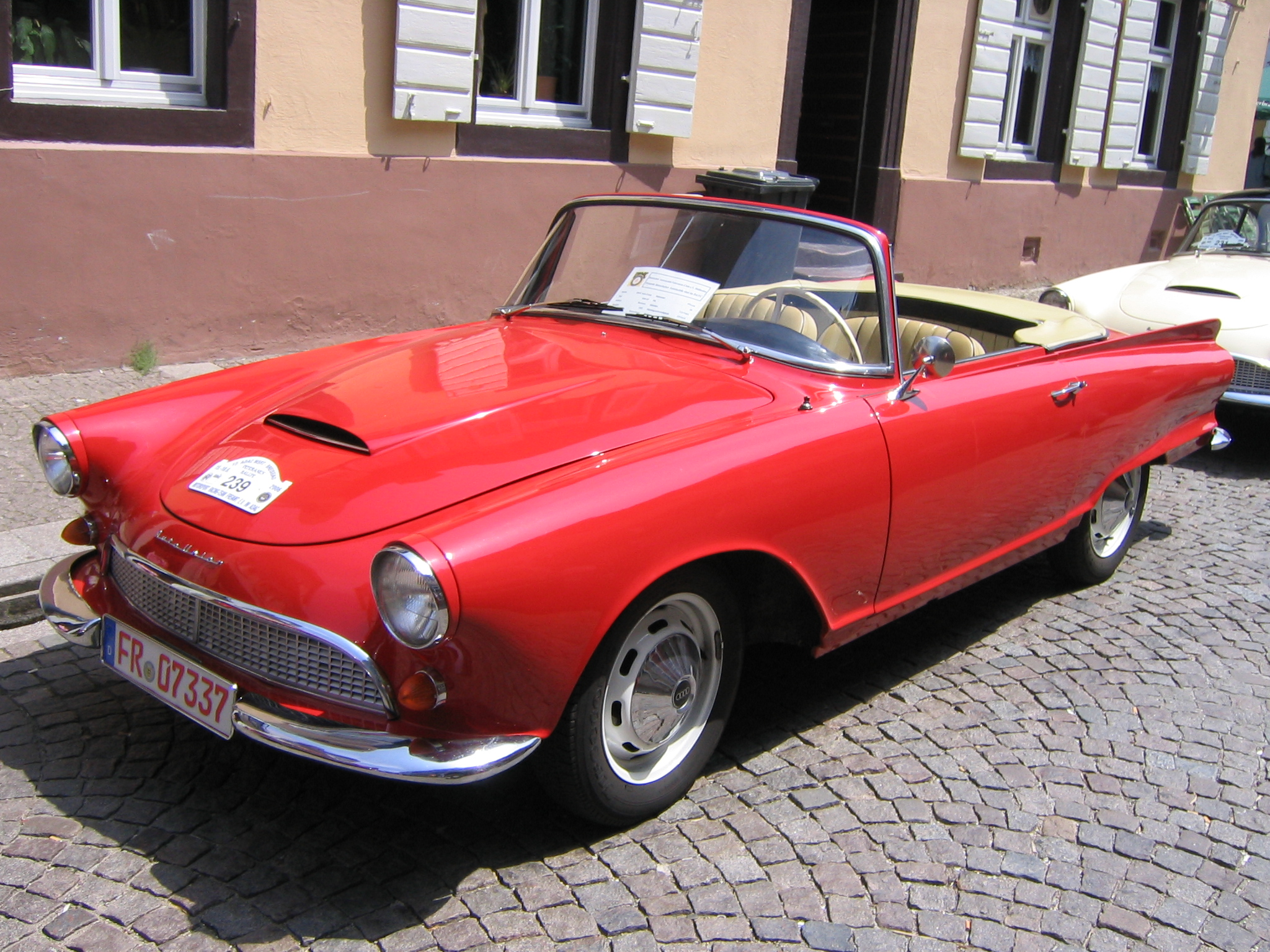
Auto Union 1000 Sp Cabriolet 1962

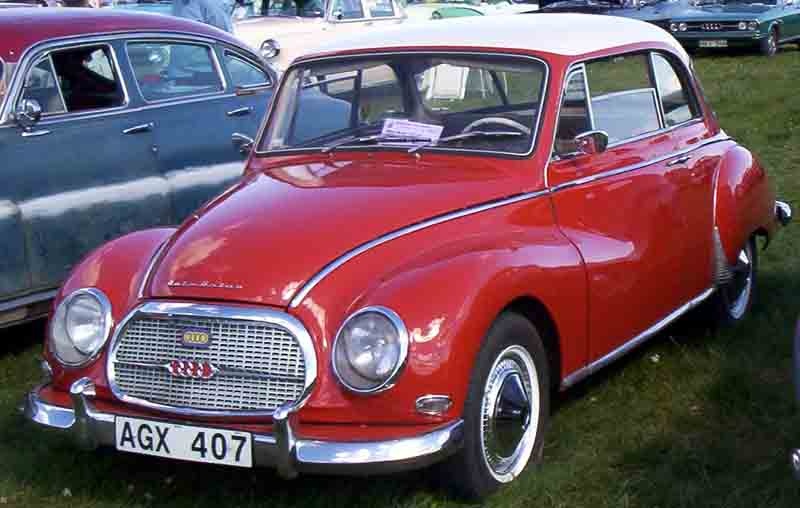
DKW AU 1000 Coupé 1959

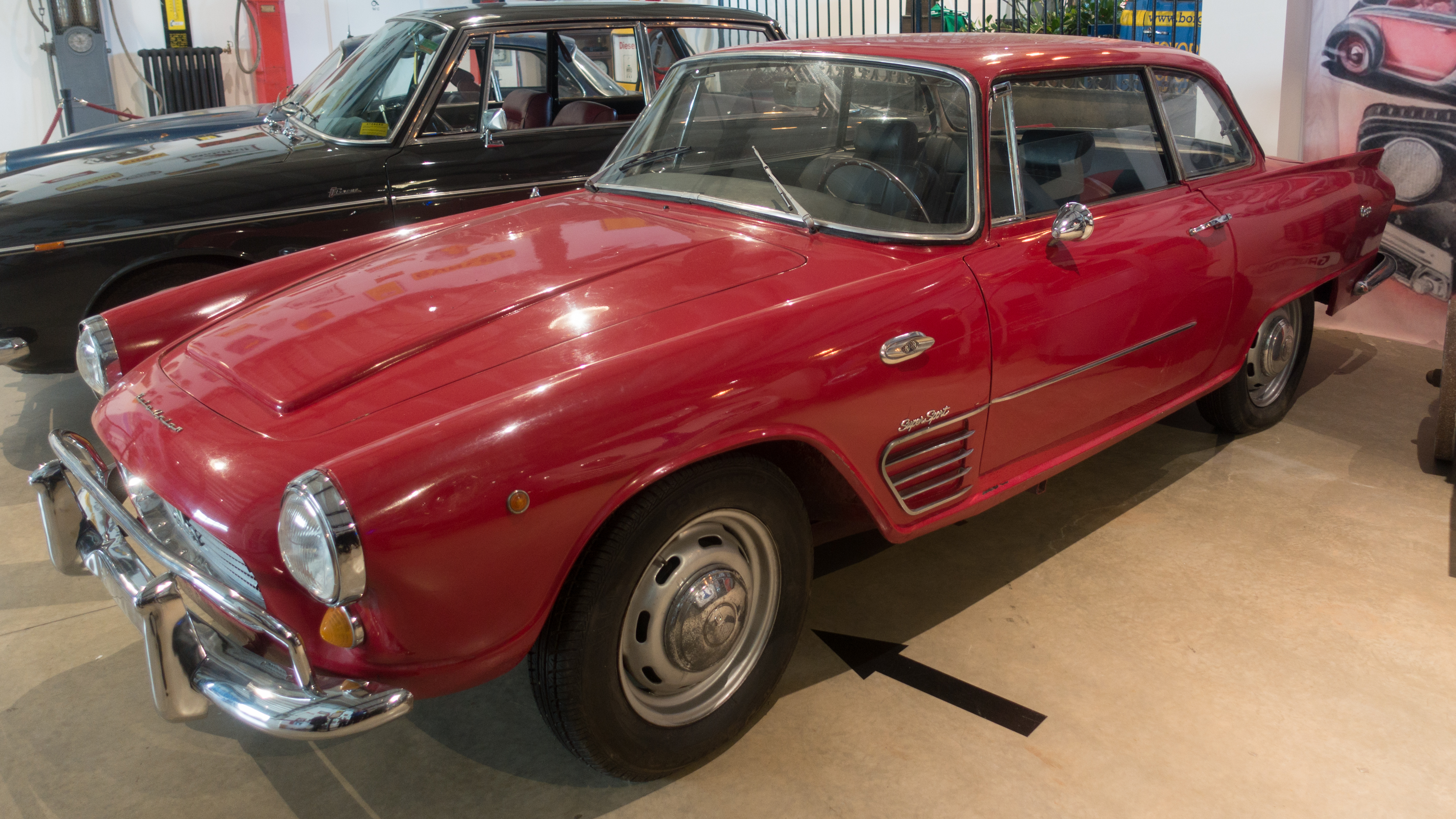
Argentine-made Auto Union 1000 Super Sport Coupé, with Fissore-designed bodywork

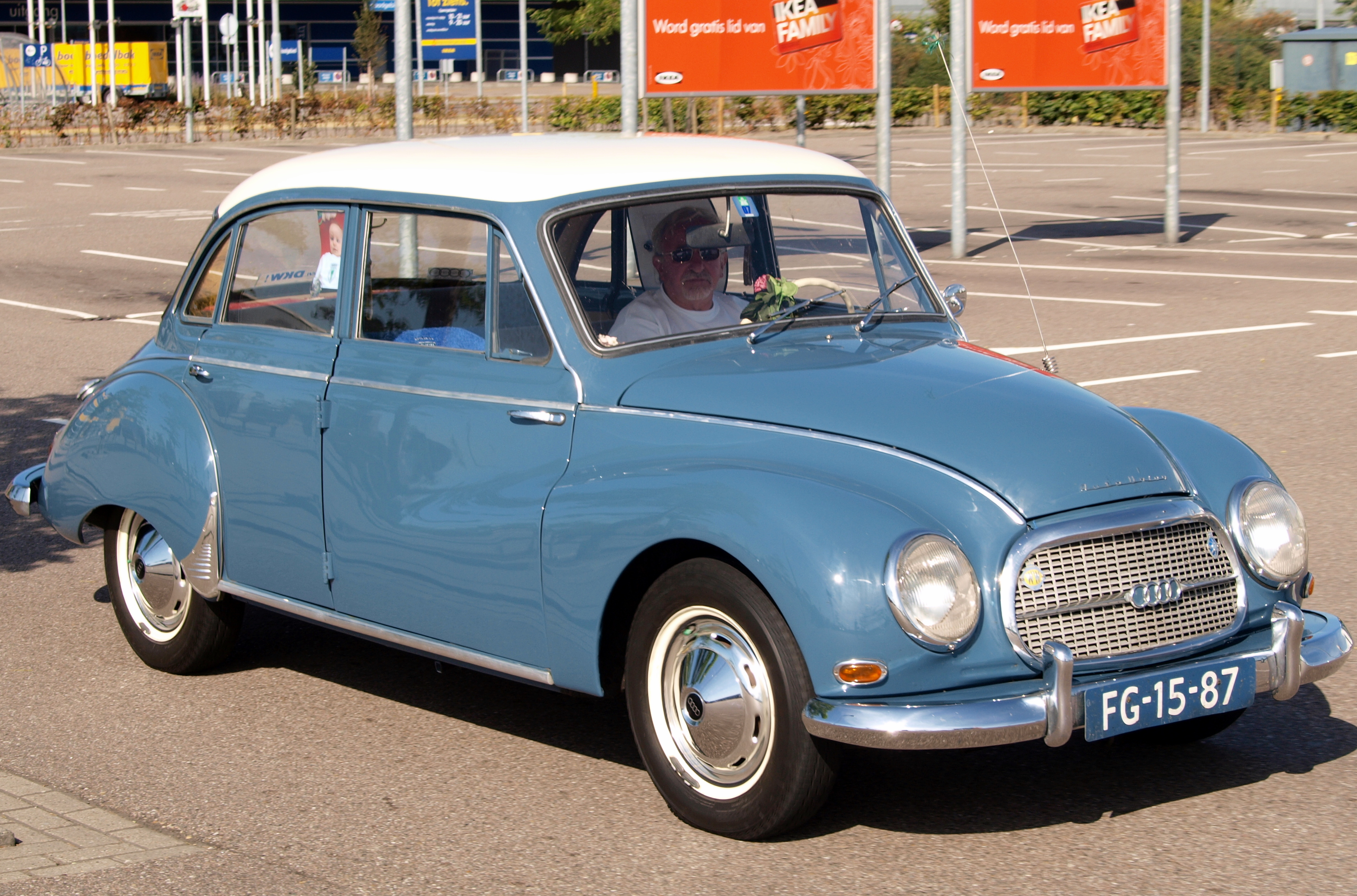
1960 Auto Union 1000S four door

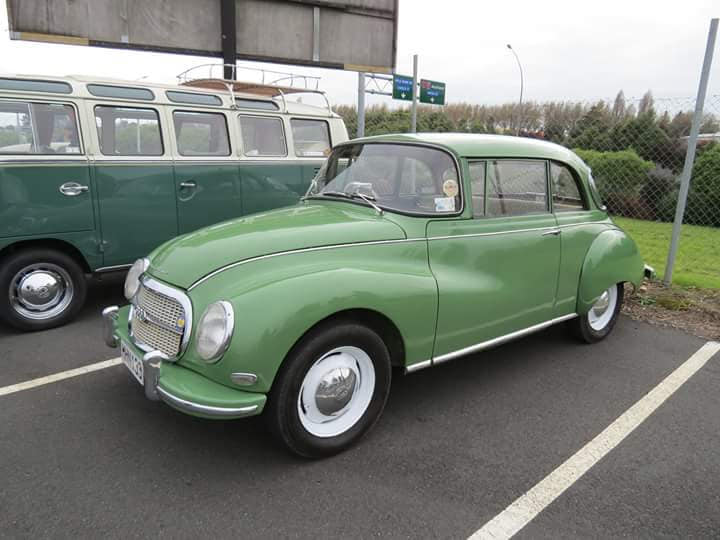
1959 Auto Union 1000 two door limousine

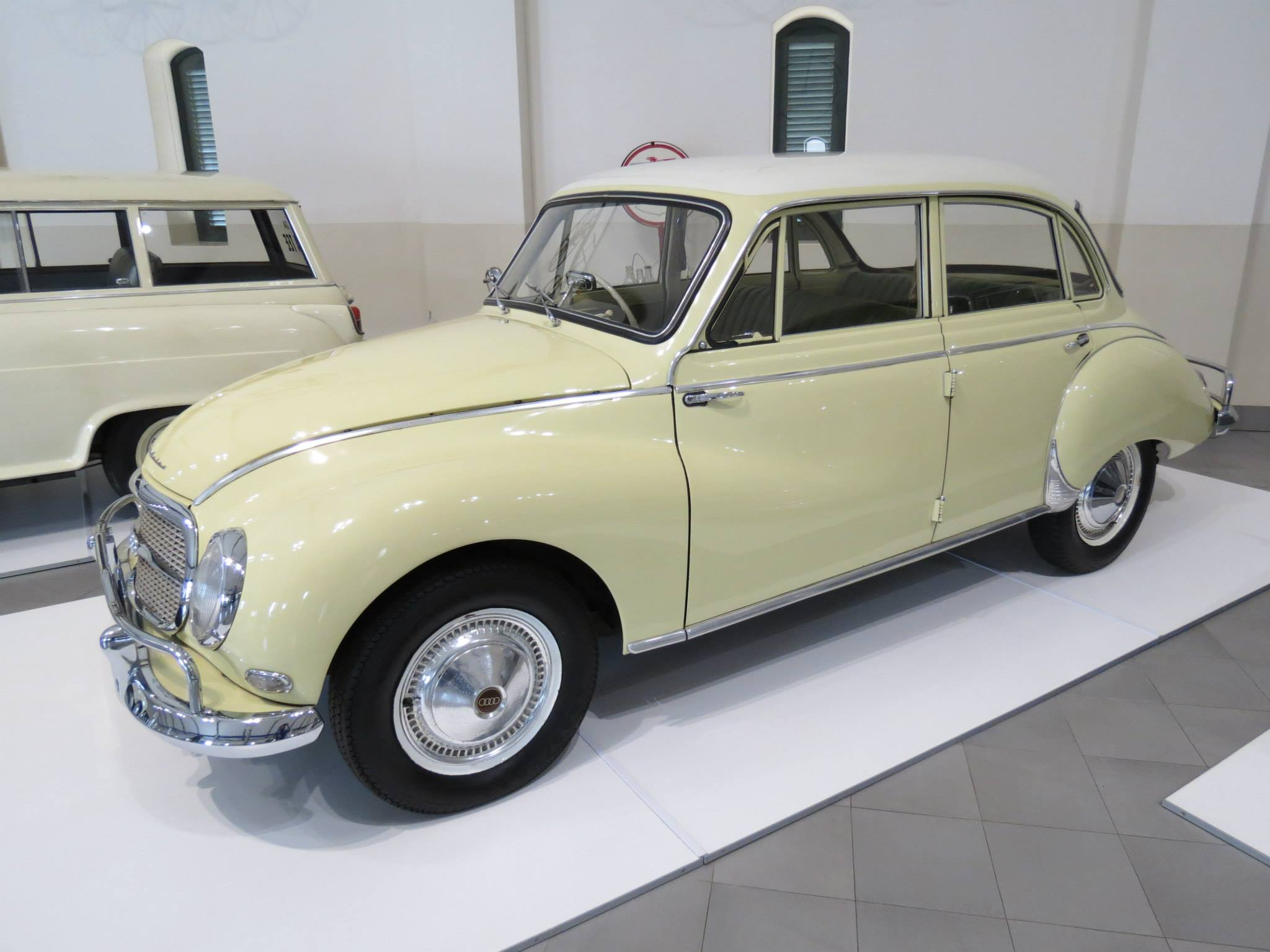
1960 Auto Union 1000S four door on display at the Franschoek Motor Museum in South Africa.

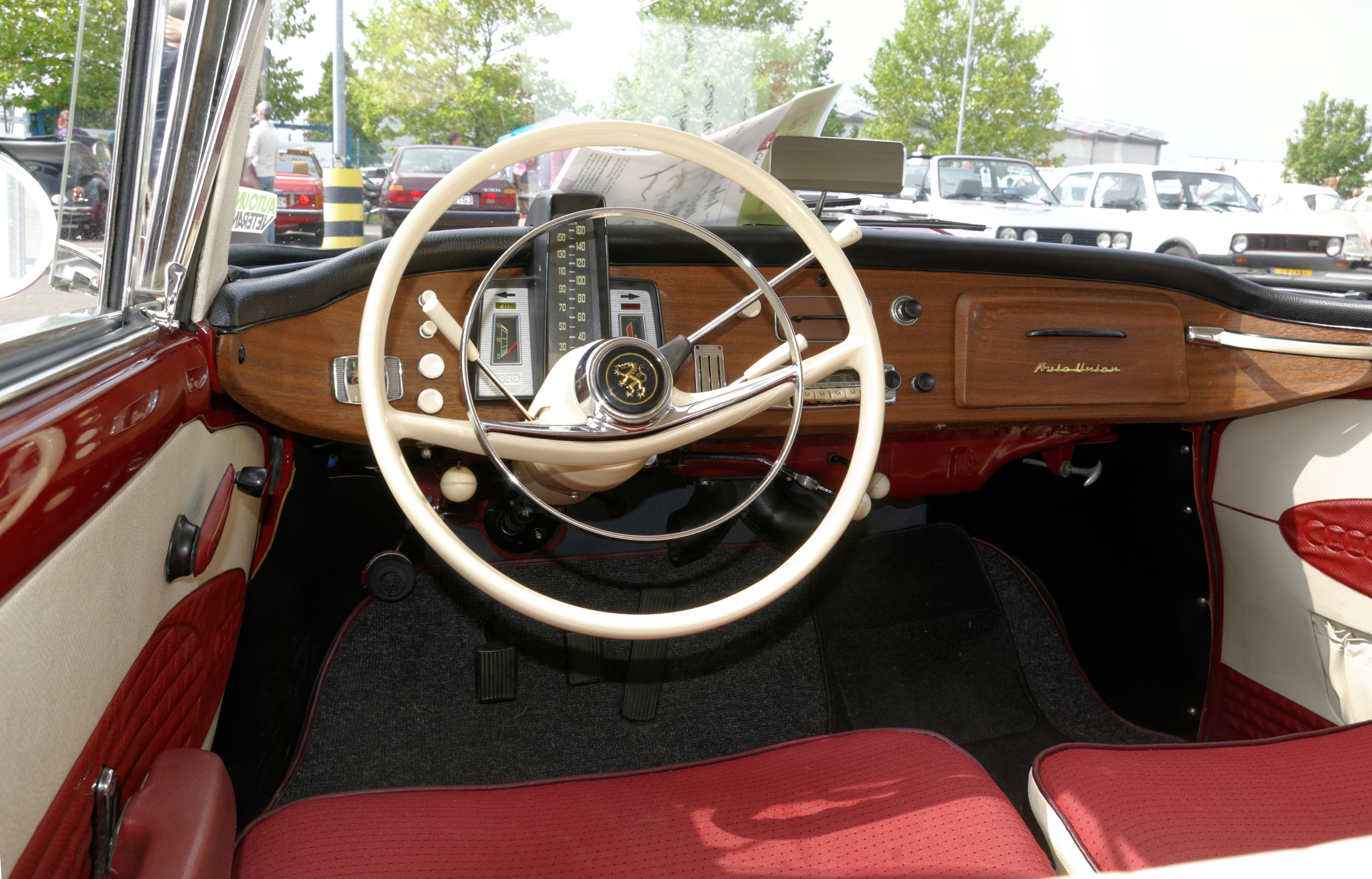
Interior of a 1963 Auto Union 1000S Coupé Deluxe

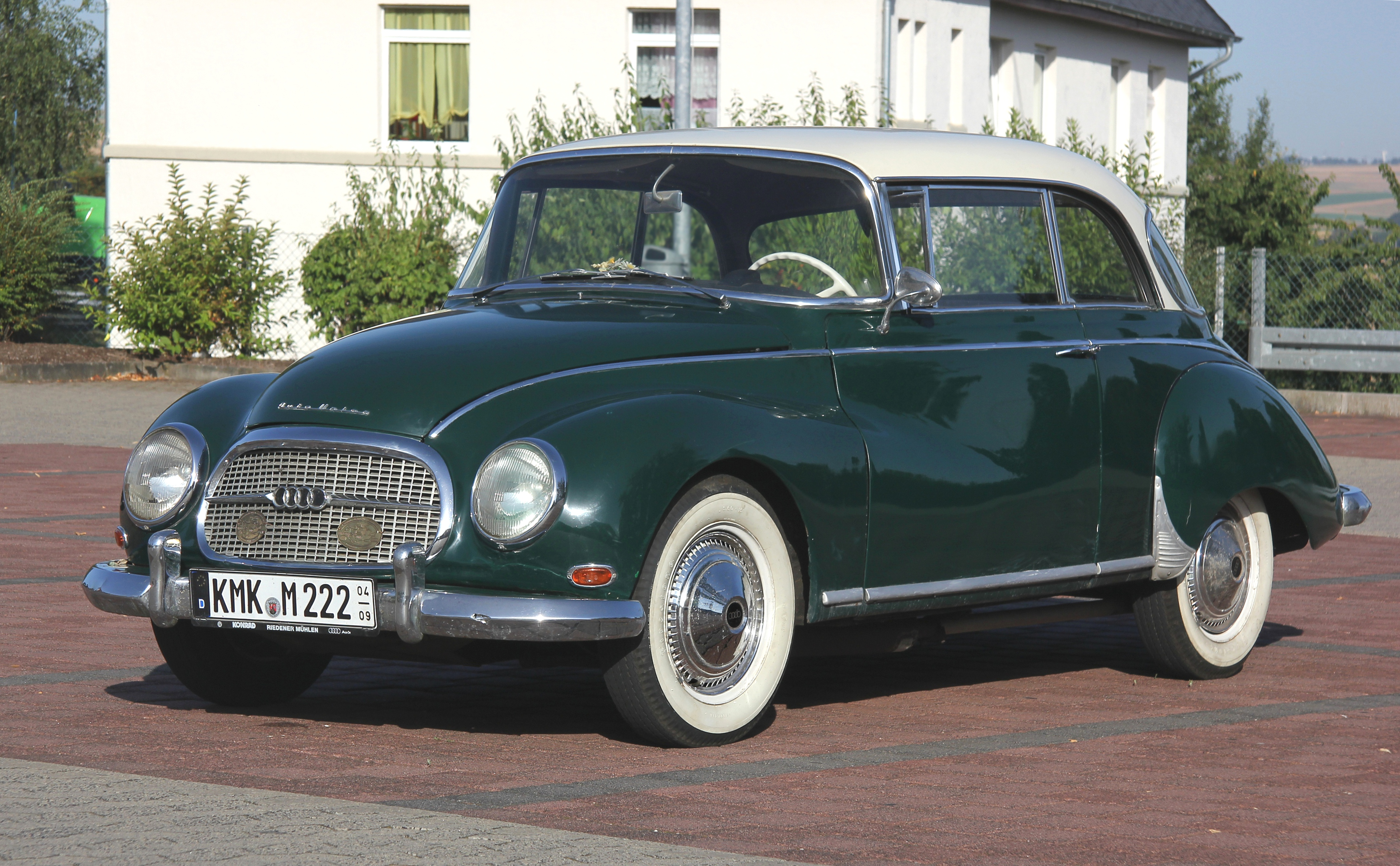
Early 1960 Auto Union 1000S Coupé with rear view mirror mounted on the roof

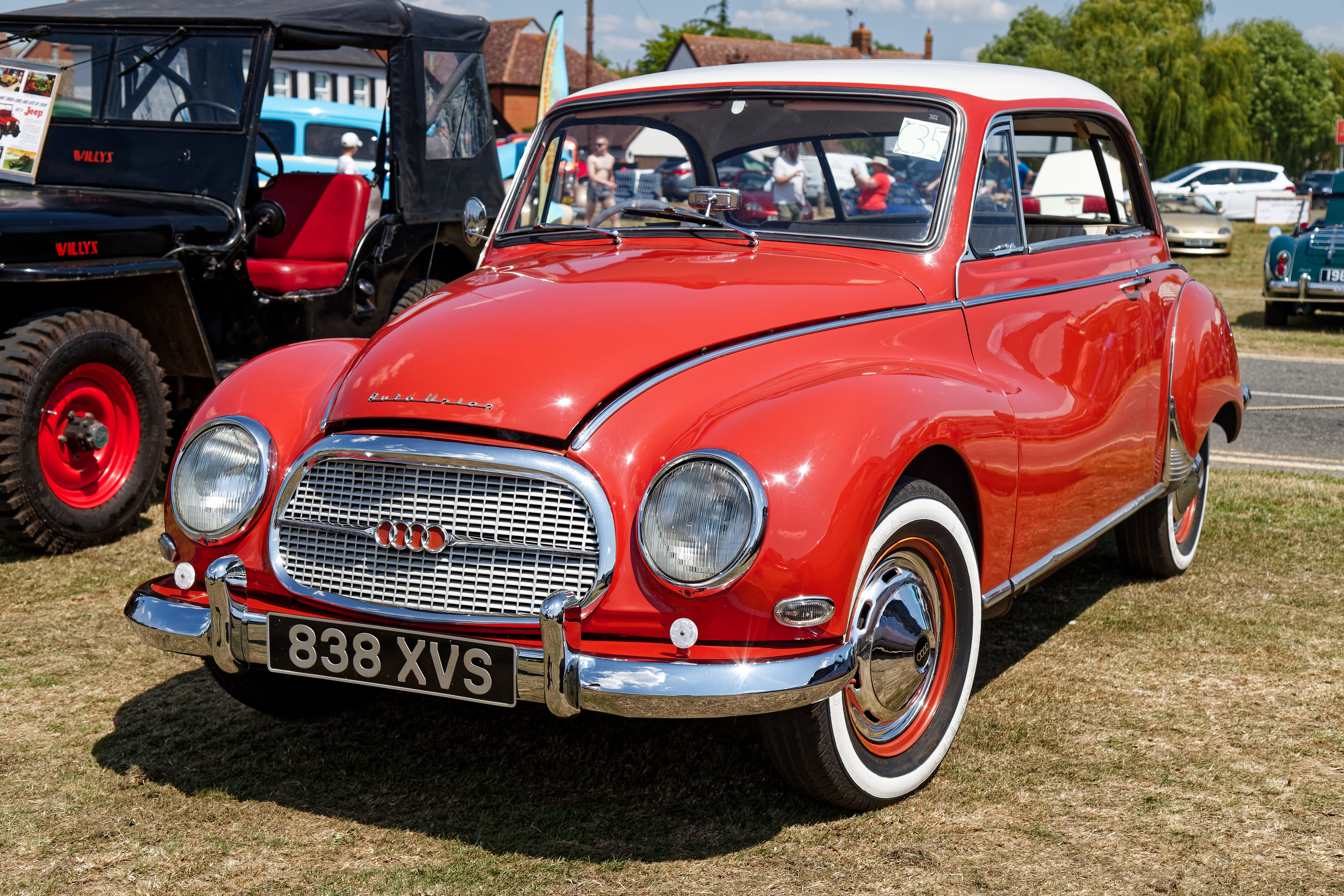
1958 Auto Union 1000 Coupé Deluxe in the UK

== Data ==
Technical data Auto Union 1000 (Manufacturer's figures except where stated)
Auto Union 1000	2-door saloon, 2-door pillarless coupé	4-door saloon	'Sp' Spezial hardtop, 'Sp' Spezial cabriolet	'Universal' 3-door estate	'S' 2-door saloon, 'S' 2-door pillarless coupé	'S' 4-door saloon
Produced:	1957–1960	1957–1960	1958–1965	1959–1962	1960–1963	1959–1963
Engine:	Two-stroke straight-three engine, front-mounted longitudinally					
Bore x Stroke:	74 mm x 76 mm					
Displacement:	981 cc					
Max. Power at rpm:	44 PS (32 kW) at 4500		55 PS (40 kW) at 4500	44 PS (32 kW) at 4500	50 PS (37 kW) at 4500	
Max. Torque at rpm:	78.5 N⋅m (57.9 lb⋅ft) at 3000		88.3 N⋅m (65.1 lb⋅ft) at 3500	78.5 N⋅m (57.9 lb⋅ft) at 3000		
Compression Ratio:	7.25 : 1		8.2 : 1	7.25 : 1		
Fuel feed:	single Solex carburetor					
Fuel tank capacity:	45 L (11.9 US gal; 9.9 imp gal)					
Valvetrain:	None (two-stroke)					
Cooling:	Water					
Gearbox:	4-speed-manual with column-mounted lever control & front-wheel drive					
Electrical system:	6-volt					
Front suspension:	Lower wishbones beneath a transverse leaf spring					
Rear suspension::	Dead axle with trailing arms beneath a transverse leaf spring					
Brakes:	drum				drum (saloon); Front discs (coupé)	drum
Steering:	Rack & pinion					
Body structure:	Box-frame chassis. Body secured at eight fixing points					
Dry weight:	930 kg (2,050 lb)	970 kg (2,140 lb)	960 kg (2,120 lb)	950 kg (2,090 lb)	930 kg (2,050 lb)	970 kg (2,140 lb)
Loaded weight:	\1,305 kg (2,877 lb)	\1,350 kg (2,980 lb)	\1,200 kg (2,600 lb)	\1,455 kg (3,208 lb)	1,305 kg (2,877 lb)	1,350 kg (2,980 lb)
Track front/ rear:	1,290 mm (51 in) 1,350 mm (53 in)					
Wheelbase:	2,350 mm (93 in)	2,450 mm (96 in)	2,350 mm (93 in)	2,450 mm (96 in)	2,350 mm (93 in)	2,450 mm (96 in)
Length:	4,225 mm (166.3 in)	4,325 mm (170.3 in)	4,170 mm (164 in)	4,210 mm (166 in)	4,225 mm (166.3 in)	4,325 mm (170.3 in)
Width:	1,695 mm (66.7 in)	1,695 mm (66.7 in)	1,680 mm (66 in)	1,640 mm (65 in)	1,695 mm (66.7 in)	1,695 mm (66.7 in)
Height:	1,465 mm (57.7 in)	1,490 mm (59 in)	1,325 mm (52.2 in)	1,565 mm (61.6 in)	1,465 mm (57.7 in)	1,490 mm (59 in)
Turning circle:	11.7 m / 38' 4 2/3"	12.0 m / 39' 4 1/3"	11.5 m / 37' 8 3/4 "	12.0 m / 39' 4 1/3"	11.7 m / 38' 4 2/3"	12.0 m / 39' 4 1/3"
Tyre sizes:	5.60–15“	5.60–15“	155SR–15“	6.00–15“	5.60–15“	5.60–15“
Top speed:	130 km/h (81 mph)	120 km/h (75 mph)	140 km/h (87 mph)	120 km/h (75 mph)	135 km/h (84 mph)	125 km/h (78 mph)
Fuel Consumption:	10.0 litres per 100 kilometres (28 mpg_{‑imp}; 24 mpg_{‑US})	10.5 litres per 100 kilometres (27 mpg_{‑imp}; 22 mpg_{‑US})			10.0 litres per 100 kilometres (28 mpg_{‑imp}; 24 mpg_{‑US})	10.5 litres per 100 kilometres (27 mpg_{‑imp}; 22 mpg_{‑US})
