= Auto Union 1000 Sp =

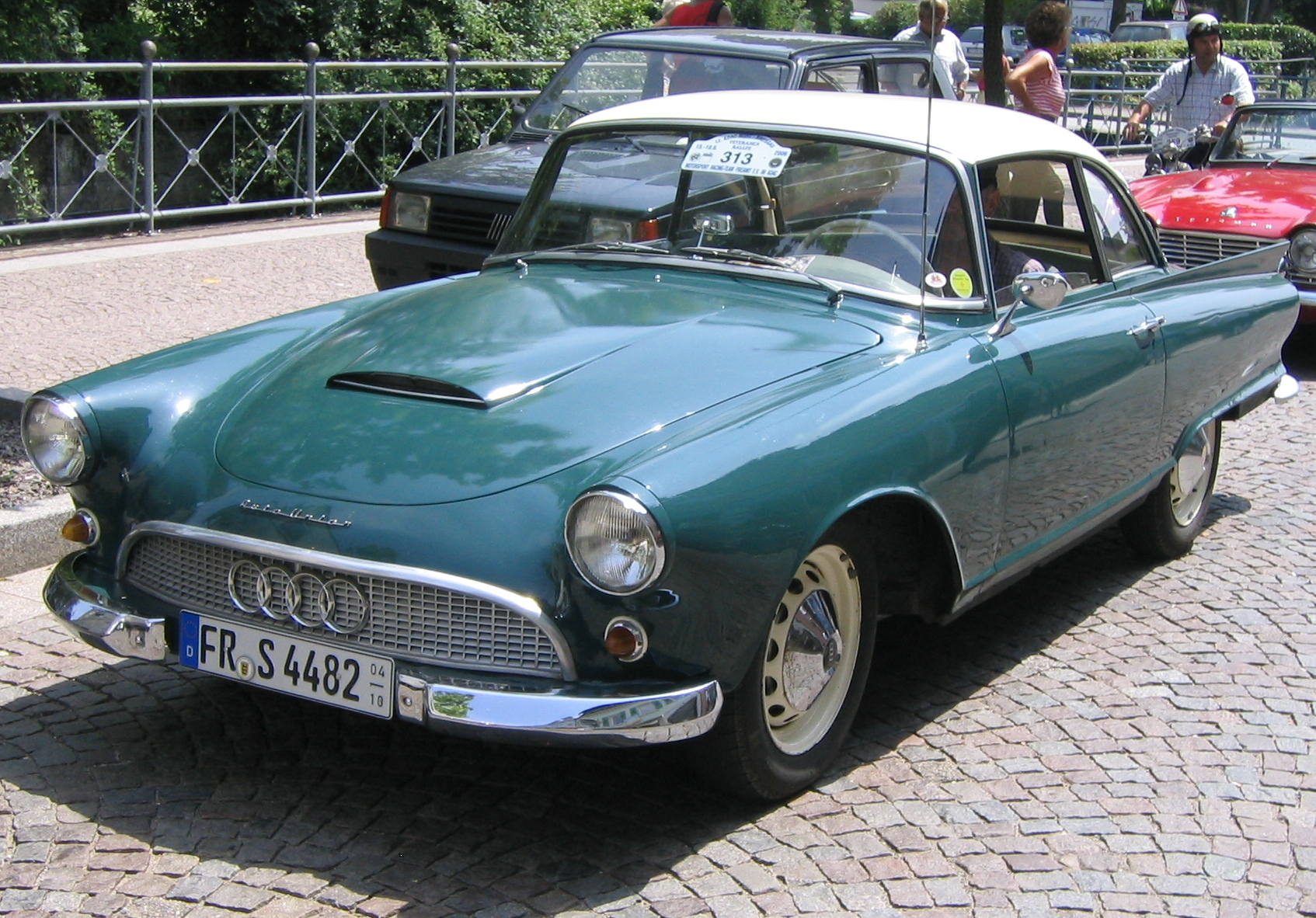

Overview
- Manufacturer: Auto Union AG
- Production: 1958–1965
- Assembly: West Germany: Ingolstadt

Body and chassis
- Class: Sports car (S)
- Body style: 2-door coupé
- Layout: Longitudinal Front-engine, front-wheel-drive
- Related: Auto Union 1000; DKW Monza

Powertrain
- Engine: 981 cc two-stroke I3
- Transmission: 4-speed manual

Dimensions
- Wheelbase: 2,350 mm (92.5 in)
- Length: 4,170 mm (164.2 in)
- Width: 1,680 mm (66.1 in)
- Height: 1,325 mm (52.2 in)
- Kerb weight: 950 kg (2,094 lb)

Chronology
- Predecessor: DKW 3=6 Coupé; DKW 3=6 Roadster
- Successor: Audi 100 Coupé S

The Auto Union 1000 Sp is a sports car produced by Auto Union from 1958 to 1965. It was equipped with a 981cc two-stroke 3-cylinder engine producing 55 PS (40 kW; 54 hp). 5,000 coupes and 1,640 convertibles were produced between 1958 and 1965. In 1959, 50 models were produced with a 1,280cc two-stroke V6 engine. The car takes strong styling cues from the Ford Thunderbird. It would be the last open top car to be produced by the company for another three decades; the next one came in the form of the Audi 80 convertible in 1992.

== Gallery ==
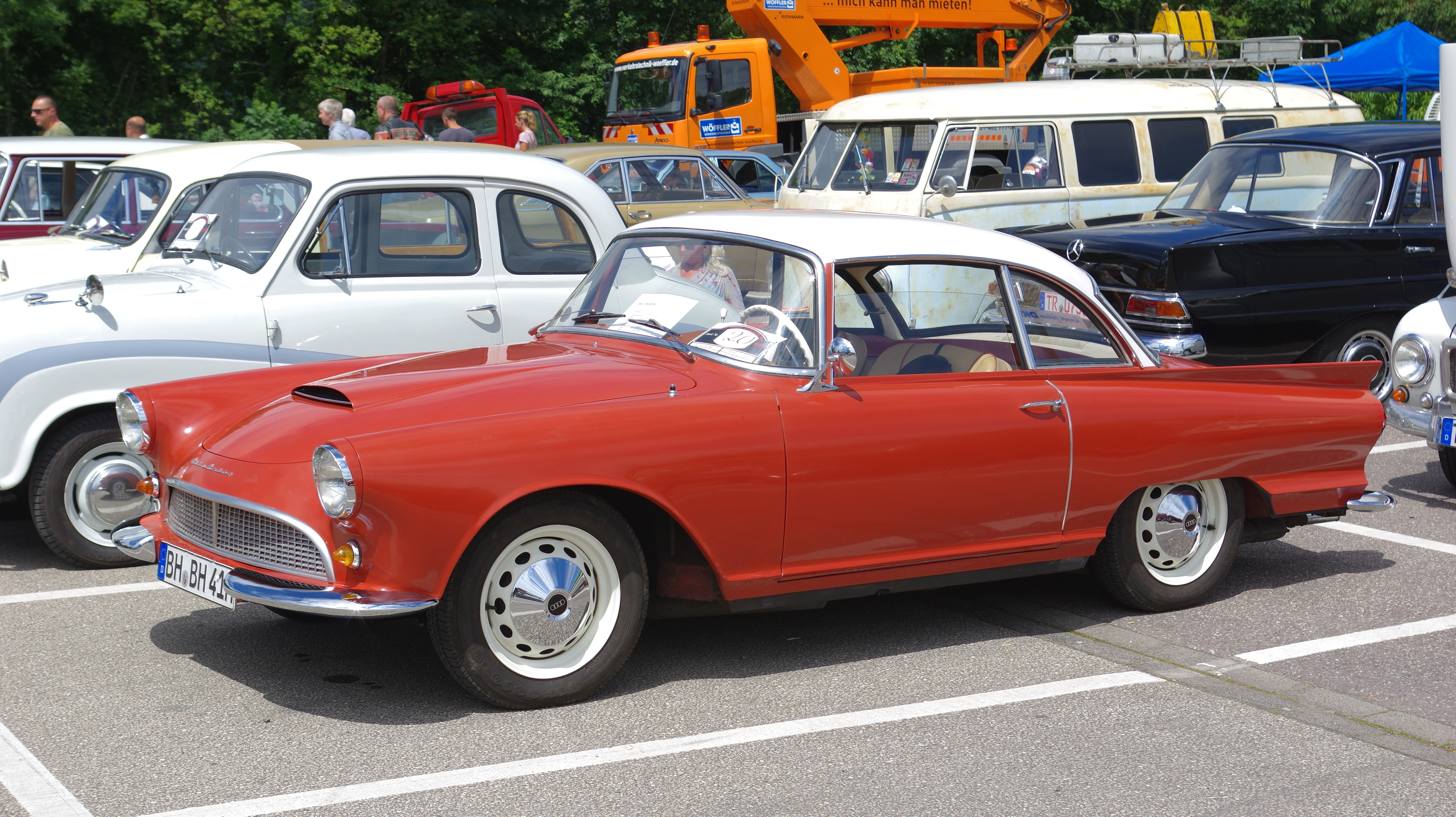
Coupé

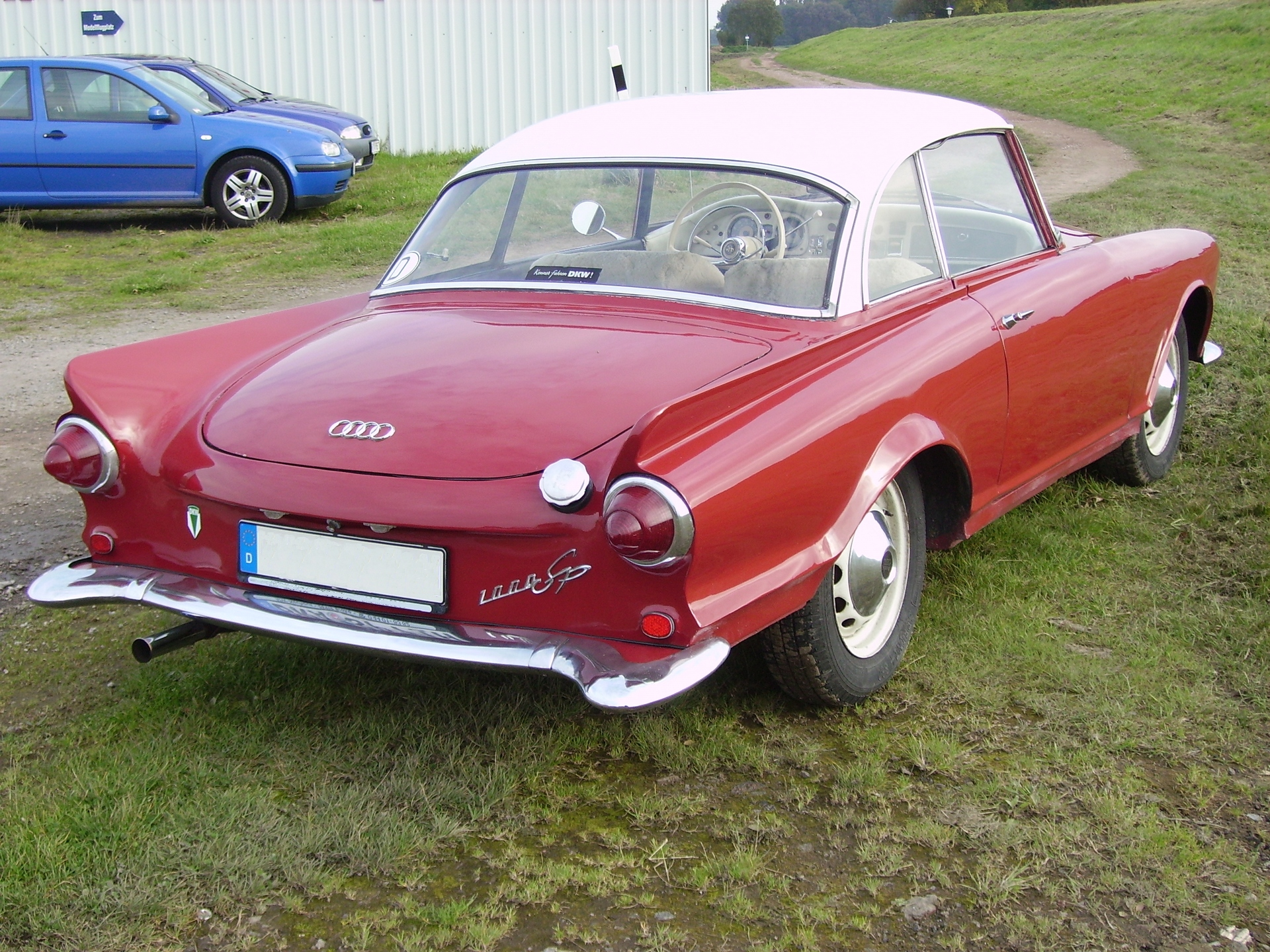
Coupé (rear view)

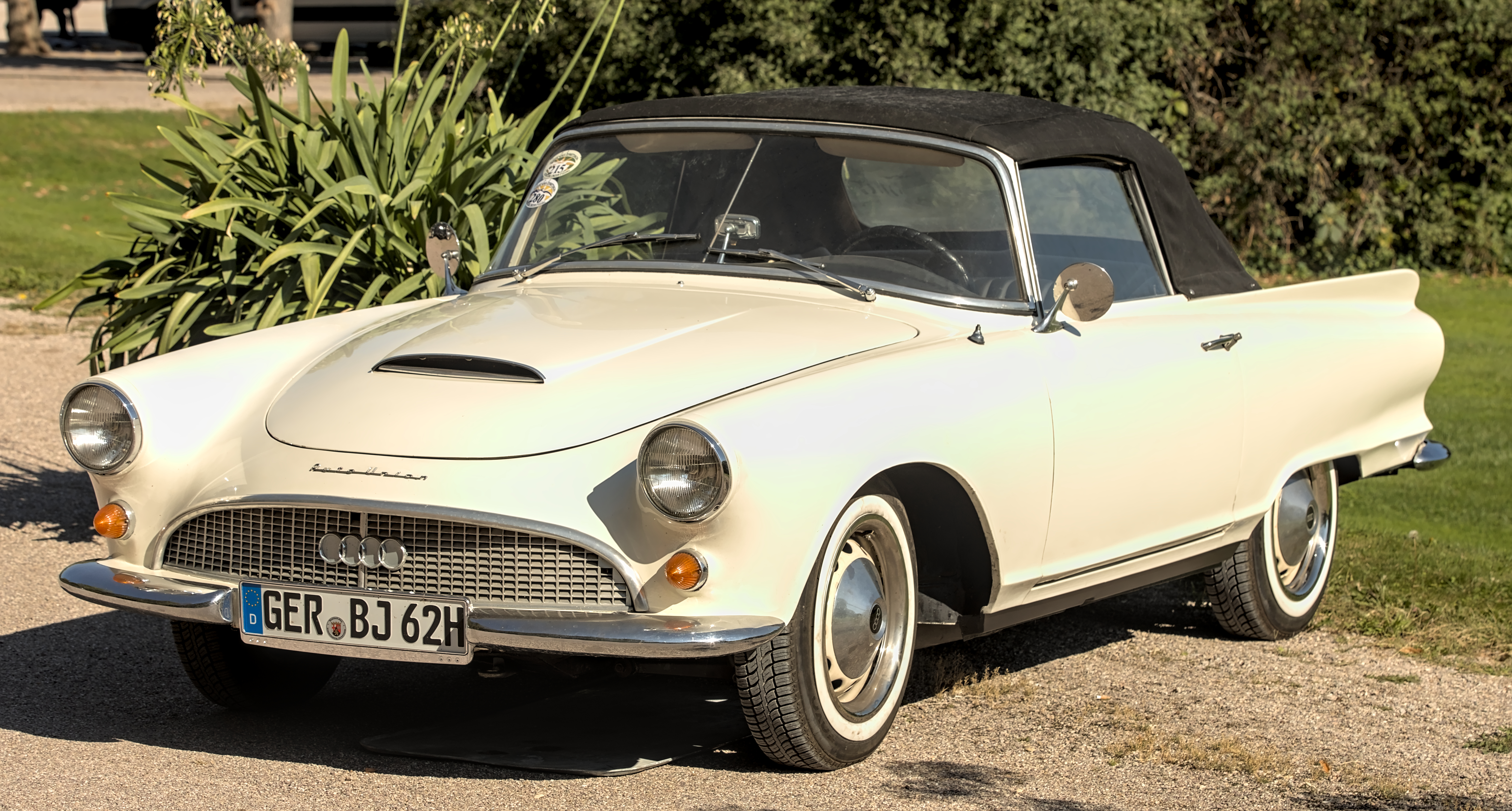
Roadster

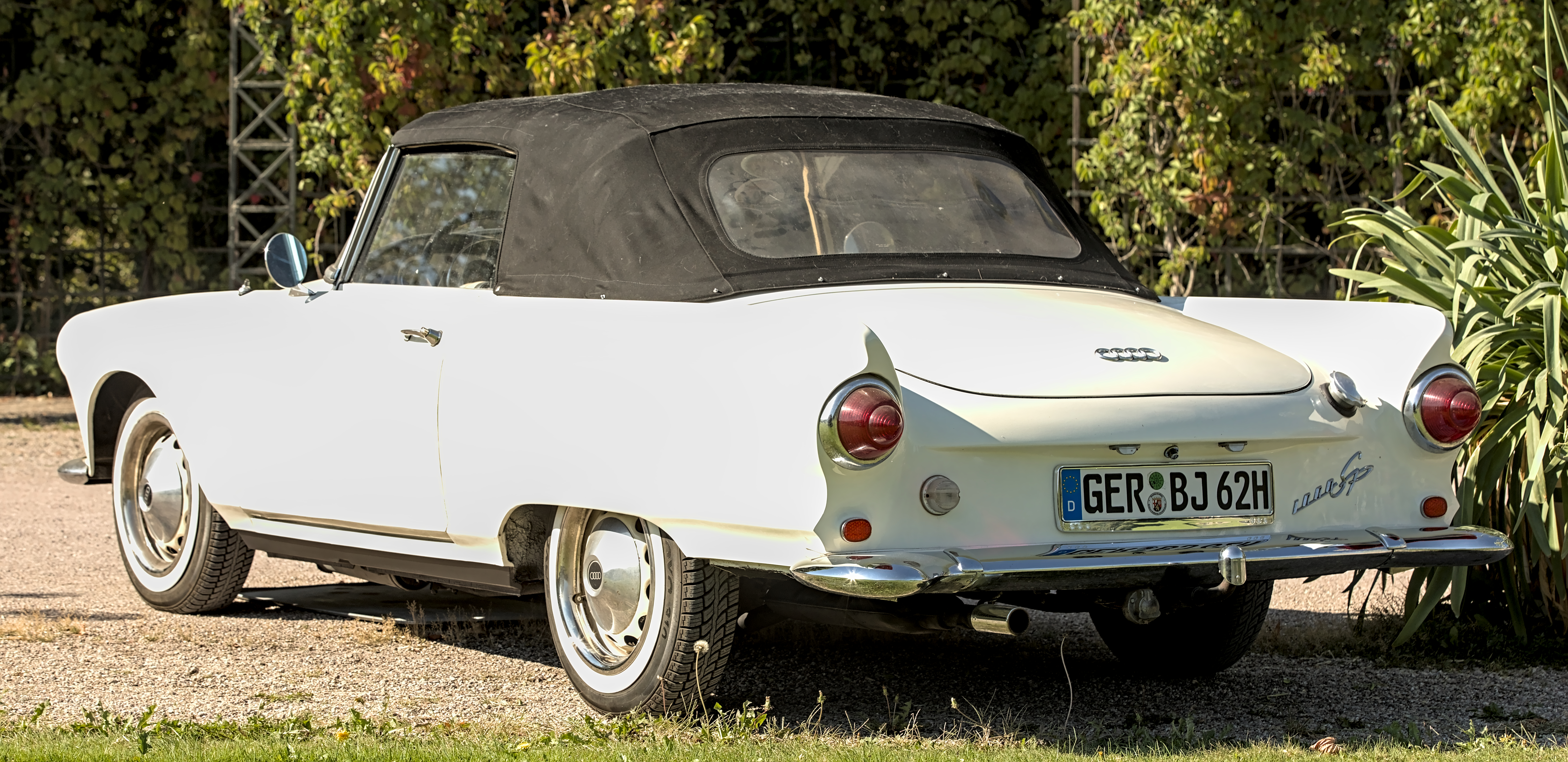
Roadster (rear view)

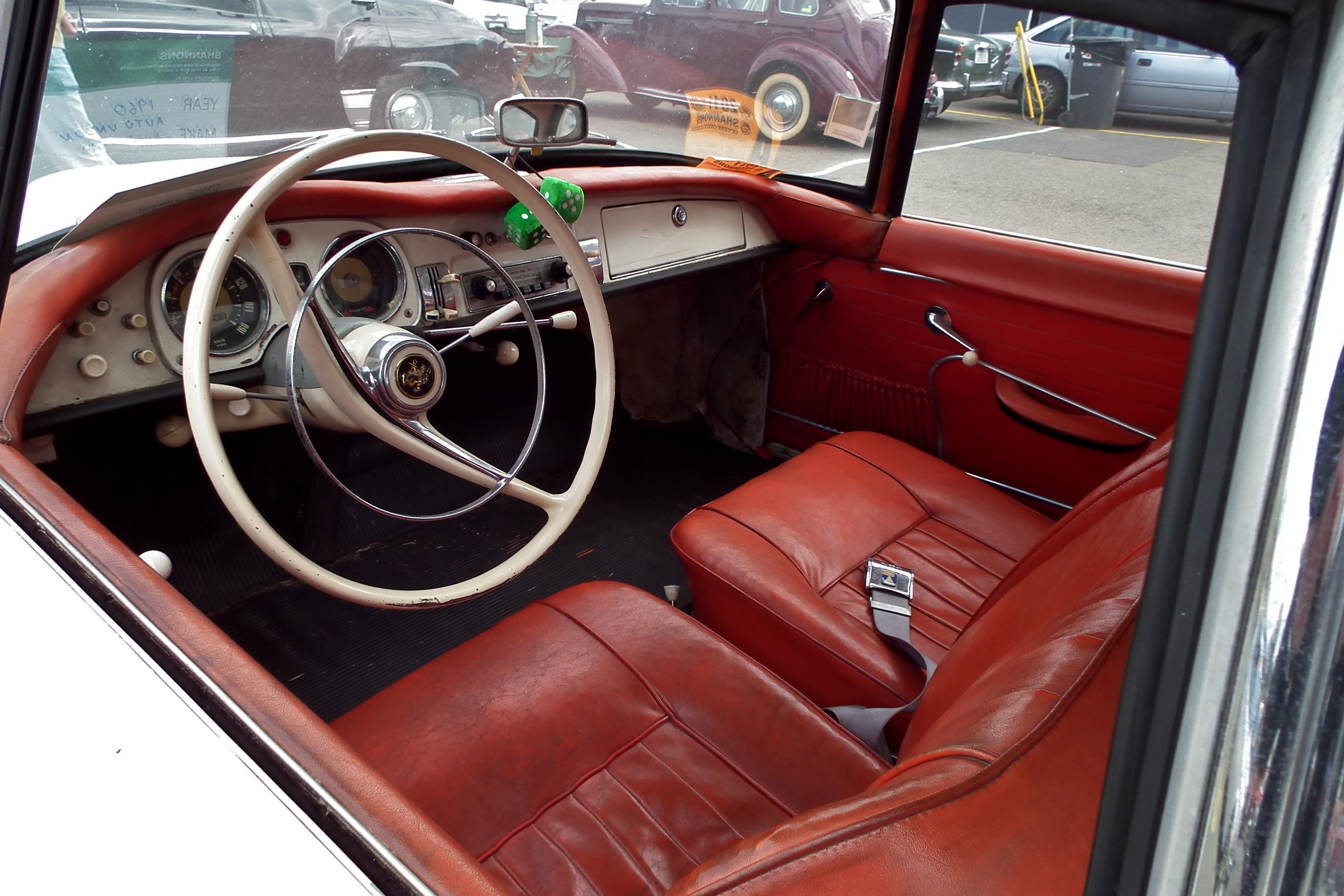
1960 1000 Sp Coupé interior

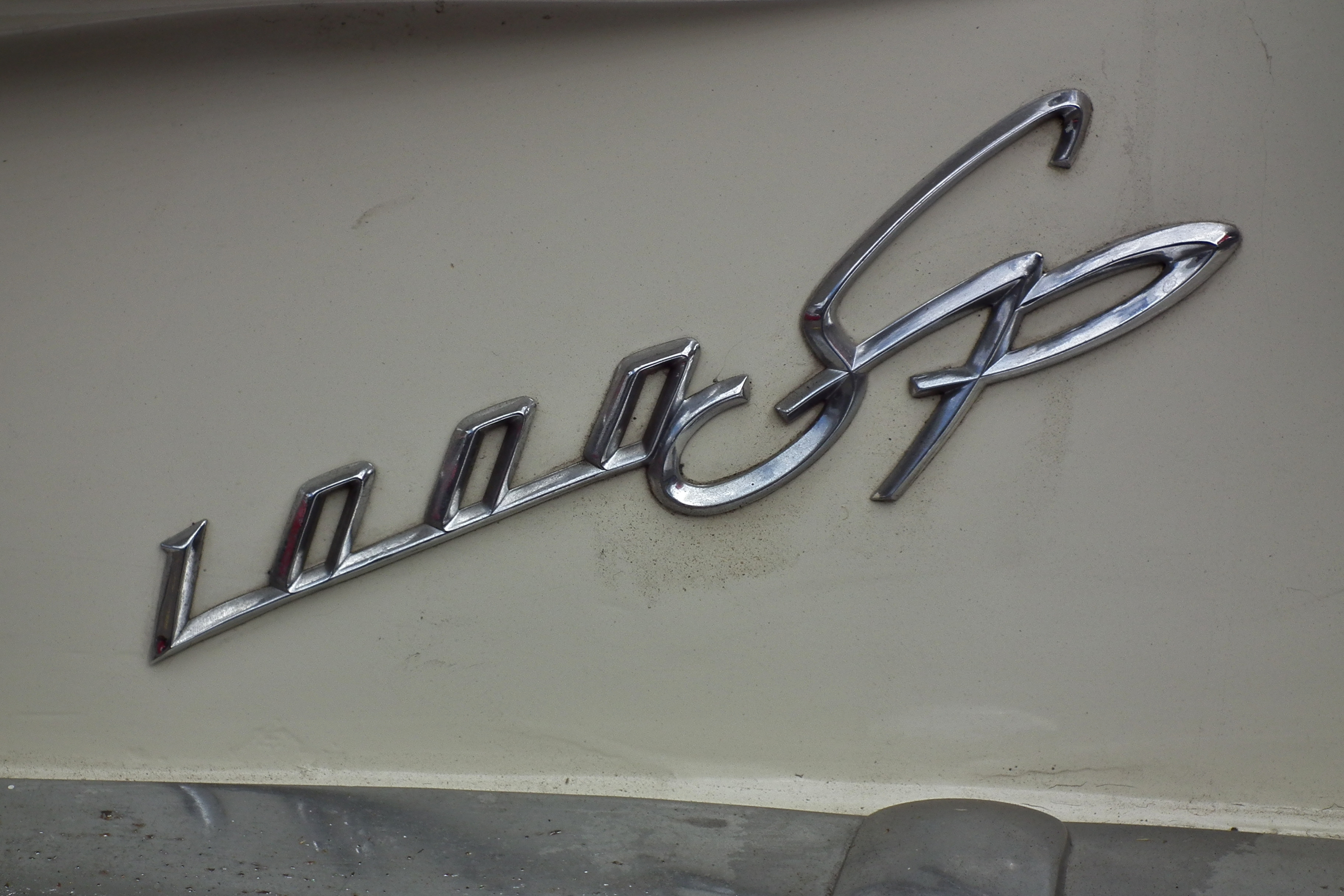
1000 Sp badge

== Technical specifications ==
Model	1000 Sp Coupé	1000 Sp Roadster
Years of production	1958–1965	1961–1965
Units built	5,004	1,640
Number of cylinders	in-line three-cylinder	
Engine capacity (cc)	981	
Engine power	55 PS (40 kW) at 4500 rpm	
Torque	93.2 Nm at 3000 rpm	
Transmission	4-gear. Manual transmission	
Drive unit	front	
Acceleration from 0–100 km/h (0–62 mph)	22 seconds	
Tires	155 x 15	
Weight	950 kg (2,094 lb).	
Fuel tank capacity	51 L.	
Maximum speed	140 km/h (87 mph)	
Average fuel consumption	10.2 L.	

== See also ==
- Ford Thunderbird
