= DKW Monza =

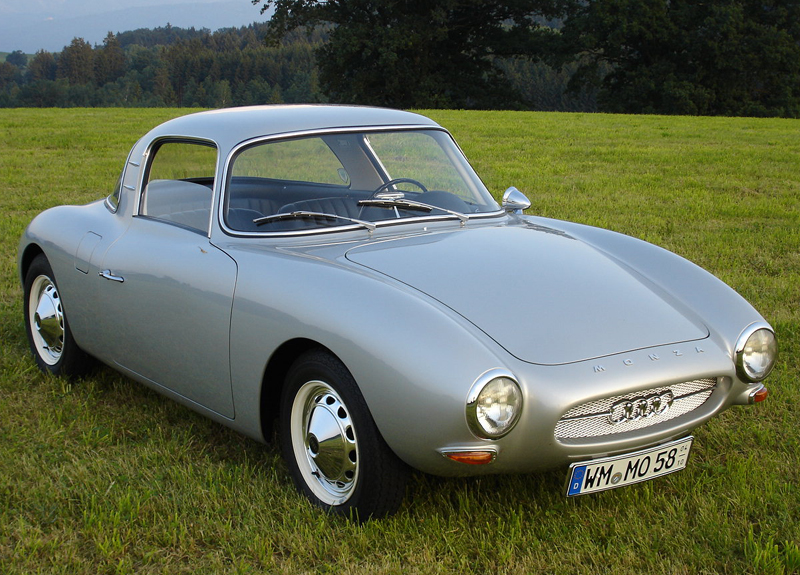

Overview
- Manufacturer: DKW
- Production: 1956–1958
- Assembly: West Germany: Stuttgart; West Germany: Heidelberg

Body and chassis
- Class: Sports car (S)
- Body style: 2-door coupé
- Layout: Longitudinal Front-engine, front-wheel-drive
- Related: Auto Union 1000 Sp

Powertrain
- Engine: 900 cc two-stroke I3
- Transmission: 4-speed manual

The DKW Monza is a sports car built on an Auto Union DKW base. Named after the world-famous Italian Grand Prix circuit, the car set five world records in 1956.

After the series of wins by the DKW 3=6 'Sonderklasse' in European touring car racing and rallying in 1954 and 1955, two racing drivers started to develop a sporty body for the successful model. Günther Ahrens and Albrecht W. Mantzel designed a record-breaking car on the basis of the 3=6, incorporating an extremely lightweight plastic body built at Dannenhauer & Stauss in Stuttgart, Germany.

The complete vehicles were first built by Dannenhauer & Stauss in Stuttgart, then by Massholder in Heidelberg and lastly by the company Robert Schenk in Stuttgart.

Fritz Wenk had to discontinue his Monza production in 1958 after the new Auto Union 1000 Sp was launched in 1957 and Auto Union refused to provide additional new chassis for his production of the Monza.

== Records ==
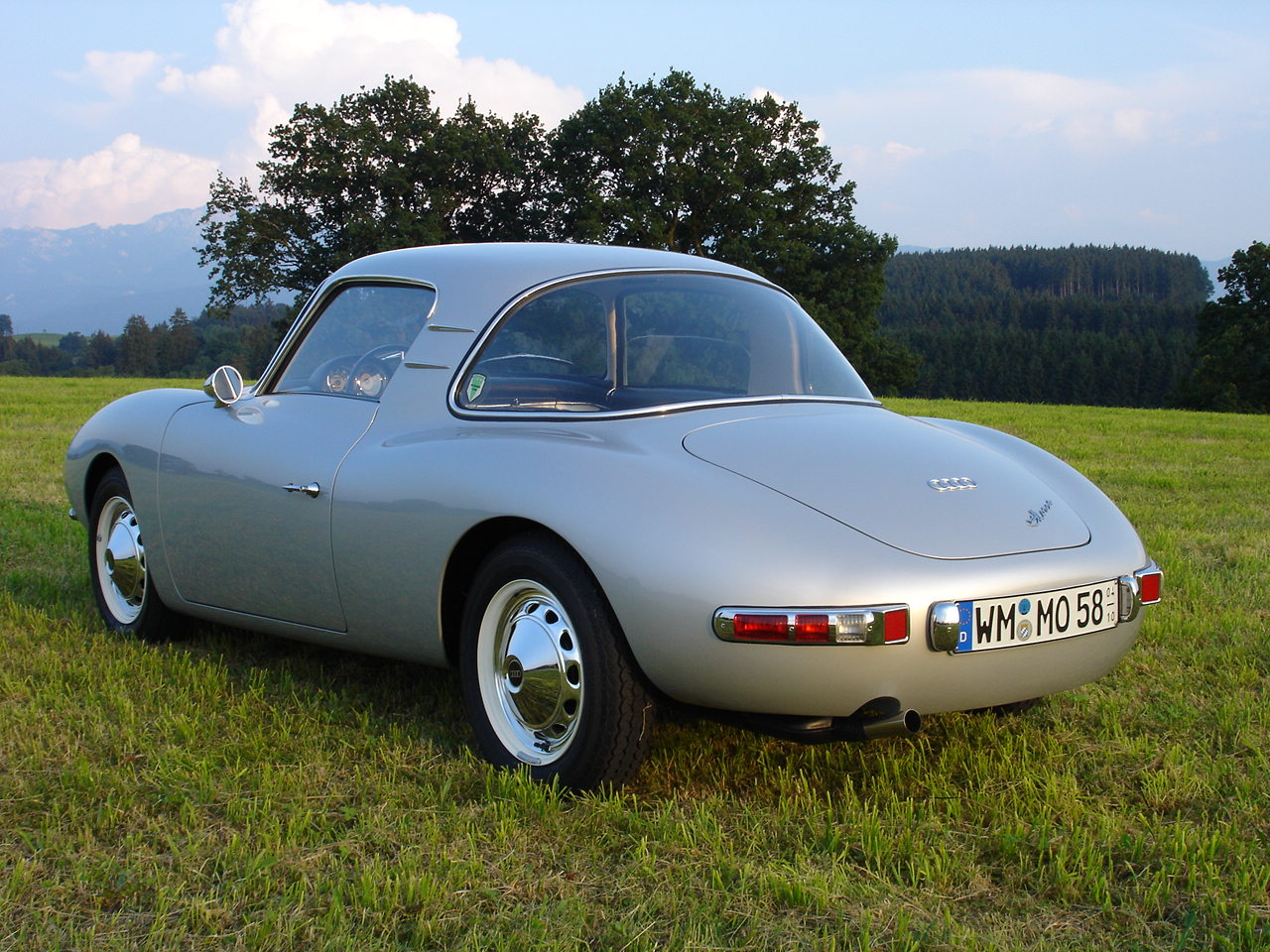
DKW Monza Schenk #12

In December 1956, a team consisting of two Germans and two Swiss spent alternating times driving a DKW Monza around the race track at Monza, Italy. With an average speed of 140 km/h (87 mph), the team of drivers set five international records.

The glass-fiber reinforced polyester coupe body had a smaller aerodynamic resistance due to its rounded frontal area and low profile. This made it much faster than the standard DKW. Like all DKWs of those days, the Monza had a compact chassis, 1.61 metres (63 in) wide and 1.35 metres (53 in) high, with an average weight of about 780 kilograms (1,720 lb). This was 115 kilograms (254 lb) less than the DKW 3=6 limousine (4-door. Sedan).

The two stroke three produced a power stroke with each rotation of the crankshaft, unlike a four stroke which produced a power stroke with every other rotation of the crankshaft. With the complete rotation cycle of the three-cylinder engine, DKW people thought of it as a “6” of a six-cylinder machine. Consequently, the use of the emblem, “3=6”.

The three-cylinder engine, displacing 900cc and producing 40 hp (30 kW), allowed the 3=6 sedan model to reach 125 km/h (78 mph). It could accelerate from 0–100 km/h (62 mph) in 31 seconds. With the same engine, the Monza could reach 140 km/h (87 mph) and accelerate from 0–100 km/h (62 mph) in 20 seconds.

== Numbers of produced cars ==
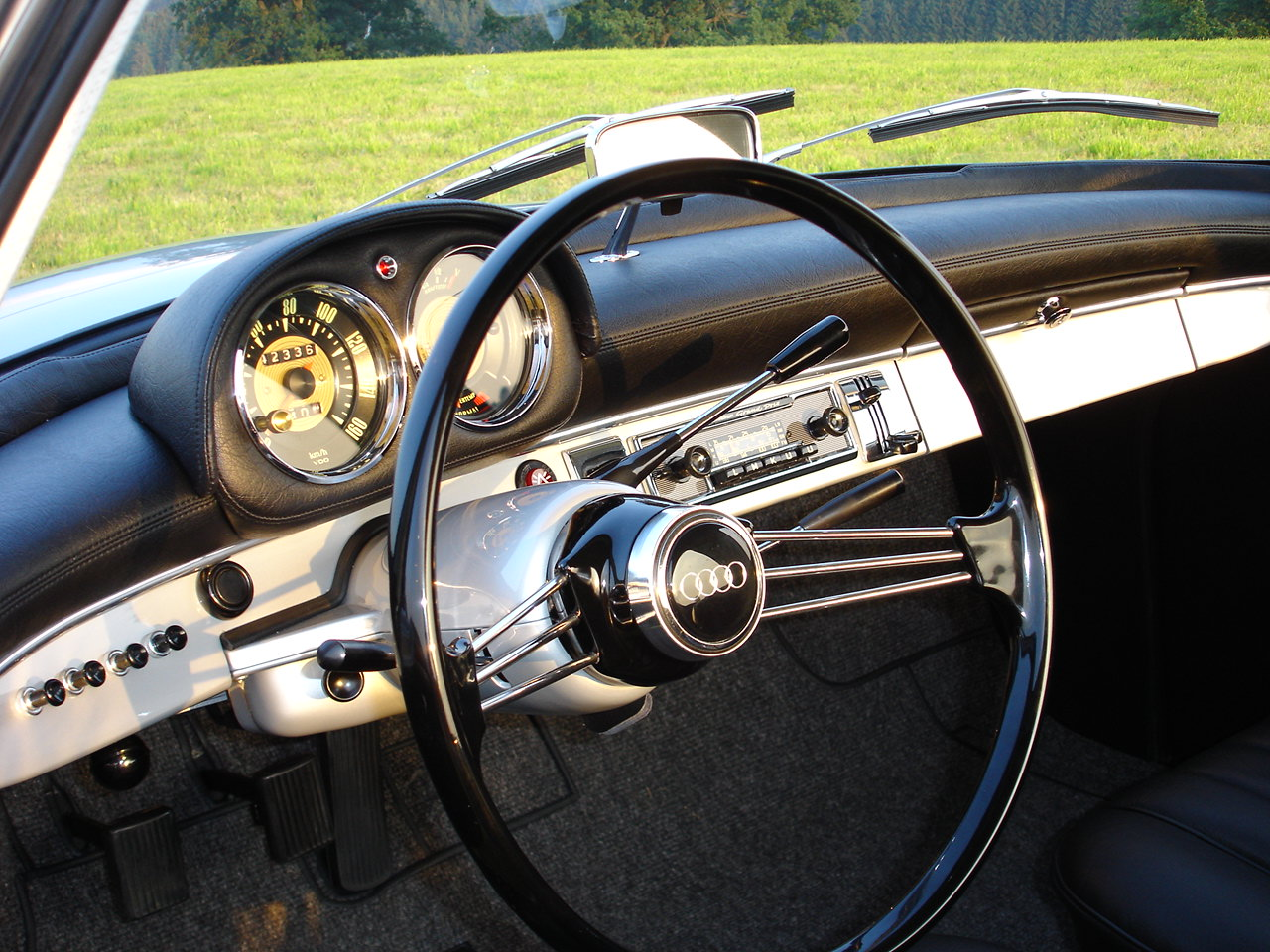
DKW Monza Schenk #12

Conflicting reports as to the actual numbers built has been circulated. One of the reasons for this is that there was never an accurate record kept. With several companies making them at various times it was difficult to maintain a good production record. Therefore, it was very difficult to suggest a final production report on the actual number of Monzas built. Making it more difficult was the additional used vehicles at the company and Monza kits that were sold to the public.

According to an analysis of the currently 61 known chassis numbers carried out in 2022, it can be assumed that only 75 vehicles (+/- 2) were produced.

There are still 50 vehicles worldwide.

== See also ==
- Porsche 356
