= International Motor Show Germany =

Annual German motor show

International Motor Show Germany Internationale Automobil-Ausstellung (IAA)

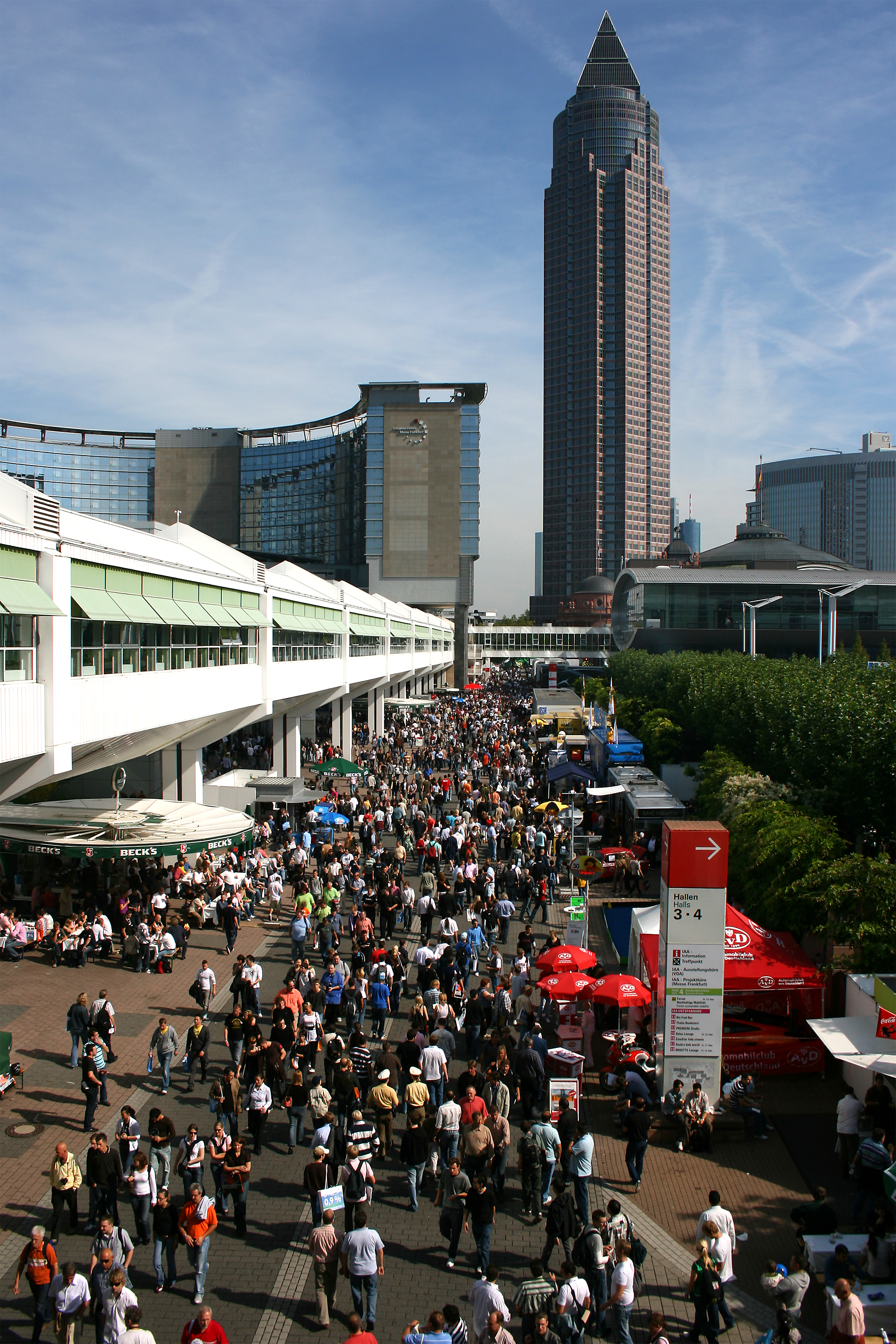
- The Frankfurt Trade Fair during the 2007 Frankfurt Motor Show with the Messeturm in the background
- Status: Active
- Genre: Auto show
- Frequency: Annual (IAA Mobility in odd years, IAA Transportation in even years)
- Venue: Messe München (IAA Mobility); Hanover Fairground (IAA Transportation)
- Country: Germany
- Years active: 1897–present
- Previous event: 9 – 14 September 2025 (IAA Mobility); 17 – 22 September 2024 (IAA Transportation)
- Next event: 7 – 12 September 2027 (IAA Mobility); 15 – 20 September 2026 (IAA Transportation)
- Attendance: See here
- Organiser: Verband der Automobilindustrie (VDA)
- Website: www.iaa-mobility.com

The International Motor Show Germany or International Mobility Show Germany, in German known as the Internationale Automobil-Ausstellung (IAA – International Automobile Exhibition), is one of the world's largest mobility trade fairs. It consists of two separate fairs, that subdivided in 1991. While the IAA Mobility displays passenger vehicles, motorcycles and bikes, the IAA Transportation specializes in commercial vehicles. Before the separation, the show was held solely at the Messe Frankfurt.

In 2021, the IAA adopted the New Mobility World concept, formats and business model, rebranded to IAA Mobility, and moved to Munich.

The IAA is organized by the Verband der Automobilindustrie (VDA – Association of the German Automotive Industry) and is scheduled by the Organisation Internationale des Constructeurs d'Automobiles (OICA), who recognize the IAA as one of the "big five" most prestigious auto shows worldwide.

== History ==
=== At the turn of the 20th century ===
In 1897 the first IAA was held at the Hotel Bristol in Berlin, with a total of eight motor vehicles on display. As the automobile became more known and accepted, the IAA became a fixed event in Germany, with at least one held every year, usually in Berlin. From 1905 to 1907, there were two per year, as the production had increased to an industrial level. In the next years the show was suspended due to the ongoing World War I, and was then reinstated in 1921 with 67 automobile manufacturers displaying 90 vehicles under the motto "comfort".

Despite the still perceptible after-effects of the global recession, the 22nd IAA was held in Berlin in 1931, with a total of 295,000 visitors. For the first time the exhibition included front-wheel drive vehicles. In 1939, the 29th installation of the event gathered a total of 825,000 visitors – an all-time record at that time. The new Volkswagen was presented for the first time, which later came to be known as the Beetle. This was the last IAA before it was again suspended during World War II.

=== Post World War II ===
After World War II Germany and Berlin were divided. From 1947 to 1949, West Germany's automobile and accessories manufacturers took part in the export trade fair in Hanover. The automobile industry's hall acted like a magnet on the public, with a great number of visitors coming to the show. In 1951 the Verband der Automobilindustrie (VDA – Association of the German Automotive Industry) moved the IAA to Frankfurt and the federal State of Hesse purchased shares in the Messe Frankfurt. The trade fair was held in April and attracted a total of 570,000 visitors, with exhibits including the first HGV to have a turbo diesel engine. Just six months later, in September 1951, a second exhibition in Berlin was held, gathering 290,000 visitors. From then on, the German automobile industry bade farewell to its traditional exhibition site in Berlin and relocated the motor show completely to Frankfurt. The IAA was also rescheduled to only take place every other year.

In 1989 the last IAA to feature both passenger cars and commercial vehicles in one show confirmed that the exhibition site in Frankfurt was now too small for this major event. Almost 2,000 exhibitors squeezed onto an exhibition site measuring 252,000 square metres. More than 1.2 million visitors attended the event. Because of the high demand, it was no longer possible to meet exhibitors' requirements for adequate exhibition stands. In view of this, the VDA decided to split the IAA from now on, with a focus on passenger vehicles in odd years, and a focus on commercial vehicles in even years. The first IAA focused solely on passenger cars, held in 1991, was a huge success. A total of 1,271 exhibitors from 43 countries displayed their new products and innovations. With more than 935,000 visitors, the IAA Passenger Cars was extremely well attended. In the following year the first IAA Commercial Vehicles took place in Hanover, Germany. It saw 1,284 exhibitors from 29 countries and gathered 287,000 people, 66 per cent being trade visitors.

In 2001 the September 11 attacks on the World Trade Center in New York cast a shadow over the IAA Cars in Frankfurt. The exhibition went ahead all the same. As a mark of solidarity with the victims and their dependants, all show elements and loud music as well as the official opening ceremony with the Federal Chancellor were cancelled. VDA President Gottschalk explained this decision: "Because we could not permit terrorist forces to take away our freedom of action. And because, as a key international sector, we have a responsibility not to allow things to grind to a halt." In an impressive manner, the general public confirmed that this indeed was the right decision to take: more than 800,000 people visited this "quiet IAA".

In spite of the Great Recession, the IAA Cars 2009 proved to be a magnet for visitors. Around 850,000 people visited the auto show in Frankfurt, which greatly exceeded the target of 750,000. The headline "A Moving Experience" showed, where the mobility of tomorrow is heading. A huge number of options were presented at the IAA, ranging from the mild hybrid and the plug-in hybrid to the all-electric car, fuel cells and hydrogen power.

=== Developments in the 2010s ===
The 2010s were marked by the transformation of the automotive industry: In 2011 the 63rd IAA featured the all-new "Hall of Electric Mobility", a first-timer to all Motor Shows worldwide. Additional IAA-premieres included the Electric Mobility Conference as well as the CarIT Conference dealing with the issue of connected driving. This approach was repeated in 2013.

In 2015, the IAA introduced New Mobility World, a platform for the entire ecosystem of electric mobility, autonomous driving, connectivity and urban mobility. In the second week of the IAA, the emissions scandal (Dieselgate) became public. Until the IAA Cars 2015, exhibitor numbers were consistently above 1,000, and the number of visitors was 931,700.

The 67th IAA Cars 2017 – the first after the emissions scandal – was overshadowed by a loss of confidence in the German automotive industry. For the first time, the number of exhibitors fell below 1,000, while the number of visitors dropped to 810,000 – the worst figure since 2001. Meanwhile, New Mobility World grew significantly to 250 participating organizations, 200 conference speakers and 250,000 visitors. Since 2017, NMW's purpose was to not only to be Europe's leading innovation platform for future mobility, but also to develop and establish formats and business models beyond the booth rental of conventional auto shows.

This trend continued at the 58th IAA Cars 2019, with New Mobility World growing to over 400 participating organizations, doubling the number of attendees to 500,000, and increasing its international reach, with 62% of the 240 speakers and 47% attendees at the English-only conference coming from abroad. International media perceived New Mobility World to have "become the meeting point for the world's leading companies in automotive technologies and mobility" by now.

The IAA itself recorded only 560,000 visitors (including NMW), the number of exhibitors fell to 873, in particular due to a further loss of international exhibitors. It was also accompanied by much larger protests than in the past. According to the organizers, a total of 25,000 participants, 18,000 of them by bicycle, came to a demonstration on 14 September for a change in traffic policy; the police spoke of about 15,000.

The IAA Cars 2019 was the last IAA held in Frankfurt. In 2021, IAA adopted the New Mobility World concept, formats and business model, rebranded to IAA Mobility, and moved to Munich.

== Change of venue location ==
2019 marked the final year that the IAA hosted its automotive exhibition in Frankfurt. In the several previous years, more and more manufacturers opted out of the IAA or greatly downsized their presence. The marques that specialise in high performance and luxury vehicles — such as Aston Martin, Bentley, Bugatti, Ferrari, and Rolls-Royce — were often the biggest draw at the IAA show, and they were absent from the several previous exhibitions. BMW had downsized its presence from 11,000 to 3,000 square metres. Since 2017, visitor numbers have almost halved, this, in addition to controversies such as Dieselgate and the global climate change issue, have prompted the IAA to change the scope of the exhibition and to pick a new venue. The rapidly decreasing number of visitors in the last several exhibitions reflected the waning enthusiasm for the IAA, along with prominent protests against the car industry by environmental activists.

The contract between Messe Frankfurt and VDA, the IAA organiser, expired in 2019. VDA chose not to renew the contract, citing the above reasons. Instead, VDA indicated its intention of moving its biannual automotive exhibitions to another city for 2021 onward. The final three candidate cities were Berlin, Hamburg, and Munich. Four other cities had also submitted bids but didn't make the final round: Cologne, Frankfurt, Hanover, and Stuttgart.

On 3 March 2020, VDA chose Munich. Munich beat out Berlin and Hamburg based on three criteria. Munich Airport is the second Lufthansa hub and has many direct international flights (second to Frankfurt); Munich is home to BMW and several other high tech industries such as Apple, Google, and many start-up companies; the city has 130,000 employees working in automobile industry. The Greens-led city council and Bavarian state government have given their support, along with 2/3 of people who responded to the survey. The event was planned to take place from 7 to 12 September, before the start of Oktoberfest, but was cancelled due to Covid. The IAA Mobility finally took place in September 2021.

== Major vehicle introductions ==
=== 1951 ===
The following introductions were made at the 1951 show:

- BMW 501
- Automobiles Marathon prototype
- Mercedes-Benz W187 220
- Mercedes-Benz W186 300
- Mercedes-Benz M180 engine
- Mercedes-Benz M186 engine

=== 1953 ===
The following introductions were made at the 1953 show:

- DKW 3=6
- Opel Olympia Rekord
- Mercedes-Benz W186 300c
- BMW 501

=== 1955 ===
The following introductions were made at the 1955 show:

- Mercedes-Benz W188 300Sc
- Mercedes-Benz W180 220S Coupe and Cabriolet
- BMW 503
- BMW 505 Prototype

=== 1957 ===
The following introductions were made at the 1957 show:

- DKW 600 (later called DKW Junior)
- Goggomobil T600
- NSU Prinz I
- Opel Kapitän
- Opel Rekord P1
- Maico 500 Sport
- Lloyd 600
- Goliath 1100
- Ford Taunus P2
- Borgward Isabella

=== 1959 ===
The following introductions were made at the 1959 show:

- BMW 700
- Borgward P100
- Mercedes-Benz W111 Sedan
- Porsche 356B T5

=== 1961 ===
The following introductions were made at the 1961 show:

- BMW 1500 Sedan
- BMW 3200 CS
- Glas 1004
- NSU Prinz 4
- Porsche 356B T6
- Jaguar E-Type

=== 1963 ===
The following introductions were made at the 1963 show:

- Alfa Romeo Giulia Sprint GT
- Glas 1700
- Glas GT
- Mercedes-Benz 600
- NSU Prinz 1000
- Porsche 356C
- Porsche 901

=== 1965 ===
The following introductions were made at the 1965 show:

- Alfa Romeo 2600 De Luxe
- Glas 1700 TS
- Glas V8
- Mercedes-Benz W108
- NSU Typ 110
- Opel Kadett B

=== 1967 ===
- Dino Berlinetta Competizione concept

=== 1969 ===
The following introductions were made at the 1969 show:

- Audi 100 Coupé S
- Opel Coupe Diplomat concept
- Porsche 914

=== 1973 ===
The following introductions were made at the 1973 show:

- BMW 2002 Turbo
- Bitter CD
- Citroën GS Birotor

=== 1977 ===
The following introductions were made at the 1977 show:

- Ferrari 308 GTS
- Ford Granada Mark II
- Opel Rekord E

=== 1979 ===
The 1979 Show occurred in a tough year for the automobile industry, with a focus on decreased speed limits and conserving energy, with most of Western Europe on the brink of a severe recession. It also occurred at a time when car design was changing substantially, with hatchbacks and front-wheel drive becoming increasingly popular, as well as demand increasing for smaller "supermini" cars.

The following introductions were scheduled for the 1979 show:

- Alfa Romeo 6
- Audi 200
- BMW 745i
- Citroën GSA (a facelifted version of the 1970 Citroën GS, which featured a hatchback instead of its predecessor's saloon body style)
- Fiat Ritmo Cabriolet
- Ford Taunus TC3 (a facelifted version of the 1976 Taunus/Cortina, which was Britain's best selling car)
- Lancia Delta (winner of the European Car of the Year award for 1980)
- Mercedes-Benz W126 (S-class)
- Mitsubishi Lancer EX (European premier)
- Renault 5 five-door model (joining the three-door hatchback model which had been launched in 1972)
- Talbot 1510
- Volkswagen Jetta (saloon version of the Volkswagen Golf)
- Volvo 345 (five-door hatchback version of the Volvo 343, launched in 1976)

=== 1981 ===
The following introductions were made at the 1981 show:

- Opel Manta 400
- Ferrari 512 BBi
- Renault 9
- Ford Granada (facelift)
- Audi Auto 2000 concept
- Bitter SC convertible
- Ford Probe III concept (which served as a preview to next year's Sierra)
- Mercedes-Benz Auto 2000 concept
- Opel Ascona C
- Opel Tech 1 concept
- Mercedes-Benz C126
- Porsche 944
- Setra
- Ford Fiesta XR2
- Ford Granada (limousine)
- Mercedes-Benz T2 (facelift)
- Daihatsu Charmant
- Daihatsu Cuore
- Fiat Ritmo
- Volkswagen Polo MK2
- Volkswagen Santana
- Volkswagen Passat
- Volkswagen Auto 2000 concept

=== 1983 ===
1983 was, in most of Western Europe, a year of recovery in the new car market, as the economy recovered from the recent recession. Many important new cars were launched at Frankfurt and elsewhere during 1983. Those launched elsewhere include the Austin Maestro, Fiat Uno, Nissan Micra, Peugeot 205 and Renault 11. The Opel Corsa (launched in Spain in September 1982) was also imported to the UK from April 1983, where it was sold as the Vauxhall Nova.

The following introductions were made at the 1983 show from 12 to 22 September:

- Alfa Romeo 33 1.5 4x4
- BMW M635 CSi (high performance version of the 635 CSi, launched in 1976)
- Fiat Regata
- Ford Sierra XR4i (fuel-injected, high performance version of the Sierra hatchback, launched in 1982)
- Mercedes-Benz 190E (new entry-level saloon in the Mercedes-Benz range)
- Opel Junior concept
- Renault Fuego Turbo (turbocharged version of the Fuego coupe, launched in 1980)
- Volkswagen Golf Mk2
- Zender Vision 1S concept (Audi Quattro based)

=== 1985 ===
The following introductions were made at the 1985 show:

- BMW M3 (high performance version of the 3 Series two-door sports saloon)
- Ferrari 328
- Ferrari Mondial 3.2
- Mercedes-Benz E Class estate
- Zender Vision 2 concept
- Porsche 959

=== 1987 ===
The following introductions were made at the 1987 show:

- Alfa Romeo 164 (flagship Alfa Romeo saloon, and the last of four cars to be developed on the Type Four platform with Fiat, Lancia and Saab)
- BMW Z1
- Ferrari F40
- Ford HFX Aerostar Ghia concept
- Lamborghini Portofino concept

=== 1988 ===
The following introductions were made at the 1988 show:

- Porsche 964 Speedster

=== 1989 ===
The following introductions were made at the 1989 show:

- Alfa Romeo SZ (high performance sporting coupe)
- BMW 8 Series (E31) (luxury sporting coupe to replace the long-running 6 Series)
- Fiat Uno (facelifted version of hugely successful supermini, in production since 1983)
- Land Rover Discovery (mid-range 4X4 in the Land Rover section of the Rover Group)
- Peugeot 605 (flagship saloon model in the Peugeot range)
- Rolls-Royce Corniche III
- Rolls-Royce Silver Spirit Mark II
- Rolls-Royce Silver Spur Mark II
- SEAT Proto T
- Toyota 4500GT
- Vauxhall/Opel Calibra (new front-wheel drive coupe from Vauxhall/Opel)
- Volkswagen Futura concept
- Zender Fact 4 Biturbo concept

=== 1991 ===
The following introductions were made at the 1991 show:

- Audi Quattro Spyder concept
- Zender Fact 4 Spider concept

=== 1993 ===
The following introductions were made at the 1993 show:

- Audi Space Frame (ASF) concept
- Isdera Commendatore 112i

=== 1995 ===
The 1995 show ran from 14 to 24 September.

The following introductions were made at the 1995 show:

- BMW 5 Series (E39)
- Citroën Xantia Break (estate version of hatchback launched nearly three years earlier)
- Lada 2110 (German introduction)
- Mercedes-Benz E-Class (W210 version)
- Mitsubishi Carisma (first European built Mitsubishi, produced at a Dutch Volvo factory)
- Opel Corsa Eco 3
- Opel Vectra (first version to use the Vectra nameplate for Vauxhall-branded models in the UK, replacing the Cavalier name)
- Peugeot 406
- Renault Mégane
- SEAT Córdoba SX
- Granvia
- Volvo S40

==== 1995 concept cars ====
- Audi TT Concept (entered production in 1998)
- Peugeot 406 Evidence
- Peugeot 406 Stadium
- Toyota Prius Prototype (entered production in 1997, imported to Europe from 2000)
- Zender Progetto Cinque
- Lotus Elise

=== 1997 ===
The 1997 show ran from 11 to 21 September.

The following introductions were made at the 1997 show:

- Alfa Romeo 156 (winner of the European Car of the Year award for 1998)
- BMW C1
- BMW Z3 Coupe
- Citroen Xsara
- Daihatsu Applause (2nd facelift)
- Land Rover Freelander (new entry-level model in the Land Rover section of the Rover Group)
- Mazda 626 estate
- Mercedes-Benz A-Class (W168)
- Mercedes-Benz C-Class (W202) (facelift)
- Nissan Patrol
- Nissan Primera (P11) estate
- Opel Astra (two years after the announcement of a prototype, entered production in early 1998)
- Porsche 911 Carrera (996)
- Renault Kangoo
- Rover 200 BRM
- Saab 9-5
- Smart Fortwo (pre-production)
- Škoda Octavia Combi (production started in early 1998)
- Toyota Corolla (E110) (European version)
- Volkswagen Golf Mk4
- Volvo C70
- Volvo V70 XC

==== 1997 concept cars ====
- Audi Al_{2} Concept that led to the 1999 Audi A2
- Daihatsu NCX, led to the Daihatsu Sirion
- Mini Prototype (entered production in 2001 under BMW ownership)
- Opel Zafira Concept (entered production just over a year later)
- Peugeot 806 Runabout Concept
- Proton Satria Cabriolet (concept)
- Toyota Funcargo, led to the 1999 Toyota FunCargo/Yaris Verso
- Toyota Funcoupe
- Toyota Funtime, led to the 1999 Toyota Vitz/Yaris/Echo
- Zender Escape 6

=== 1999 ===
The 1999 show opened on 16 September, and had nearly 1,200 exhibitors from 44 countries

The following introductions were made at the 1999 show:

- Audi A2
- Audi A8 D2 (facelift)
- BMW 3-series Touring (E46/3)
- BMW M3 E36
- BMW M5 E39
- BMW X5 (E53) (first SUV in BMW range)
- BMW Z8
- Chrysler PT Cruiser
- Citroën Saxo (facelift)
- Citroën Xsara Picasso
- Daewoo Nubira (facelift)
- Dodge Neon MK2
- Fiat Punto MK2
- Ford Cougar
- Ford Fiesta (facelift of 1995 model)
- Honda Accord hatchback
- Honda S2000
- Honda Insight (Honda's first petrol-hybrid model)
- Hyundai Accent MK2
- Hyundai Tiburon (facelift)
- Isuzu Trooper (facelift)
- Jeep Grand Cherokee (facelift)
- Kia Clarus (facelift)
- Kia Joice
- Lancia Lybra
- Lexus IS200
- Lexus RX
- Mercedes-Benz A-Class Advantgarde (W168)
- Mercedes-Benz CL
- Mazda MPV MK2
- Nissan Almera MK2 (first British-built version of the Almera, entered production in early 2000)
- Nissan Almera Tino
- Nissan Terrano II (second facelift)
- Opel Astra G (coupe)
- Opel Speedster/Vauxhall VX220 (first two-seater sports car from Vauxhall/Opel, based on Lotus Elise chassis)
- Opel Omega (facelift)
- Peugeot 607 (new flagship saloon in Peugeot range)
- Porsche 911 Turbo
- Porsche Boxster S
- Renault Avantime (luxury sporting coupe/MPV crossover; entered full production in 2001)
- Saab 9-3 Aero
- Saab 9-5 Aero
- SEAT León
- Smart (marque) (cabrio)
- Subaru Forester (facelift)
- Suzuki Jimny MK3 (Canvas-Top)
- Škoda Fabia (Typ6Y)
- Toyota Celica (T230)
- Toyota Prius
- Toyota Yaris Verso
- Toyota MR2
- Volkswagen Polo (facelift)
- Volkswagen Lupo

==== 1999 concept cars ====
- Bugatti 18/3 Chiron
- Citroën C6 Lignage (luxury saloon which was finally launched in 2005 as the Citroën C6)
- Opel Omega V8.com (never reached full production)
- Volkswagen Concept D (launched in 2002 as the Volkswagen Phaeton)

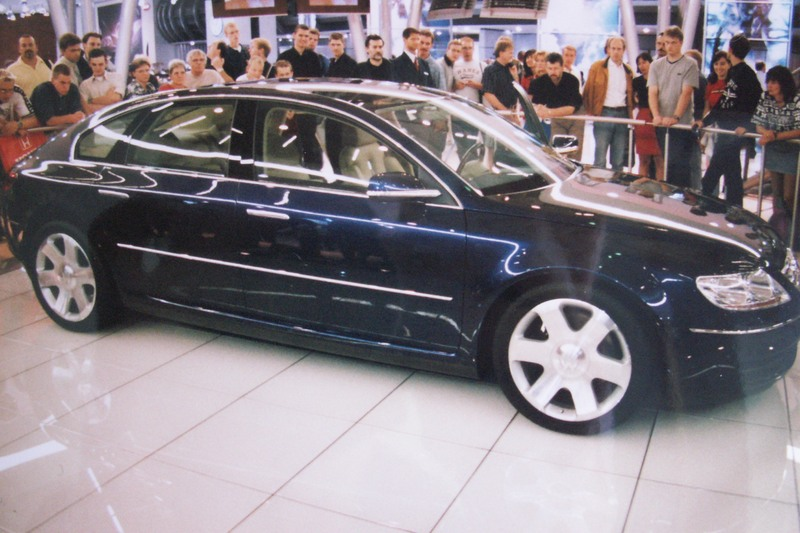
Volkswagen Concept D at the 1999 Frankfurt Motor Show

- Zender Thirty 7

=== 2001 ===
The 2001 show opened to international media on 11 September, with a series of concept and production vehicle debuts kicking off in the early morning. The following introductions were made at the 2001 show:

- Alfa Romeo 156 GTA/Sportwagon GTA
- Audi A4 Avant (estate)
- Audi A4 Convertible
- BMW 3 Series (facelift)
- BMW 7 Series (E65)
- Bugatti Veyron
- Cadillac CTS
- Citroën C3
- Ford Fiesta
- Honda Jazz
- Lamborghini Murciélago
- Mercedes-Benz SL-Class (R230)
- Opel Combo
- Renault Avantime
- Saab 9-5 (facelift)
- Škoda Superb
- Spyker C8 Laviolette
- Toyota Corolla
- Volkswagen Polo
- Volvo S60

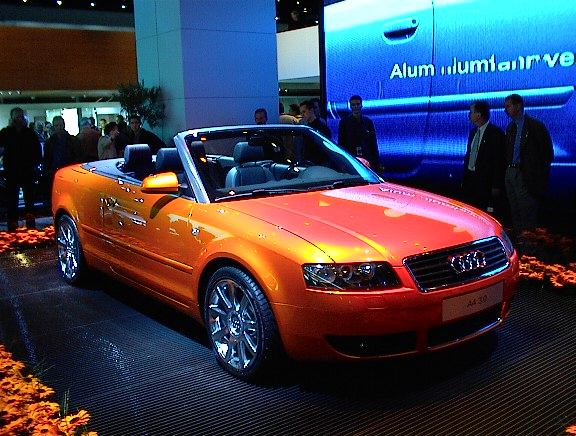
Audi A4 Convertible at the 2001 Frankfurt Motor Show

==== 2001 concept cars ====
- Audi Avantissimo
- Citroën C-Crosser
- Ford Fusion Concept
- Jaguar R-Coupe
- Hyundai Clix
- Nissan mm.e
- Nissan Crossbow
- Opel Frogster
- Opel Signum2 concept
- Peugeot 206 SW concept
- Peugeot 307 SW concept
- Renault Talisman
- Saab 9-X
- SEAT Arosa Racer
- SEAT Arosa City Cruiser
- SEAT Tango
- Suzuki GSX-R/4
- Volvo PCC 2
- Zender Straight 8
  - Originally, the Opel Vectra C was due to début with the Saab 9-3, but in July 2001, it was announced that delays had forced General Motors to postpone the introduction. Both cars were eventually introduced in March 2002, at the Geneva Motor Show.

=== 2003 ===
For the first time, the passenger car-only exhibition in Frankfurt broke the barrier of one million visitors. It featured 2,000 exhibitors from 42 countries. The following introductions were made at the 2003 show:

- Alfa Romeo 166 (facelift)
- Alfa Romeo 8C Competizione
- Alpina B7 (E65) (production version)
- Alpina Roadster S
- Aston Martin DB9
- Citroën C2
- BMW 5 Series
- BMW 6 Series
- BMW X3
- BMW X5 (facelift)
- Daewoo Lacetti
- Jaguar X-Type Estate
- Kia Picanto
- Land Rover Freelander (facelift)
- Lexus LS430
- Maserati Quattroporte
- Mazda3
- Mercedes-Benz SLR McLaren
- Mitsubishi Outlander
- Opel Astra
- Opel Vectra Caravan (estate)
- Porsche Carrera GT
- SEAT Altea Prototipo (pre-production)
- Volkswagen Golf Mk5
- Volkswagen Sharan (facelift)
- Volvo S40

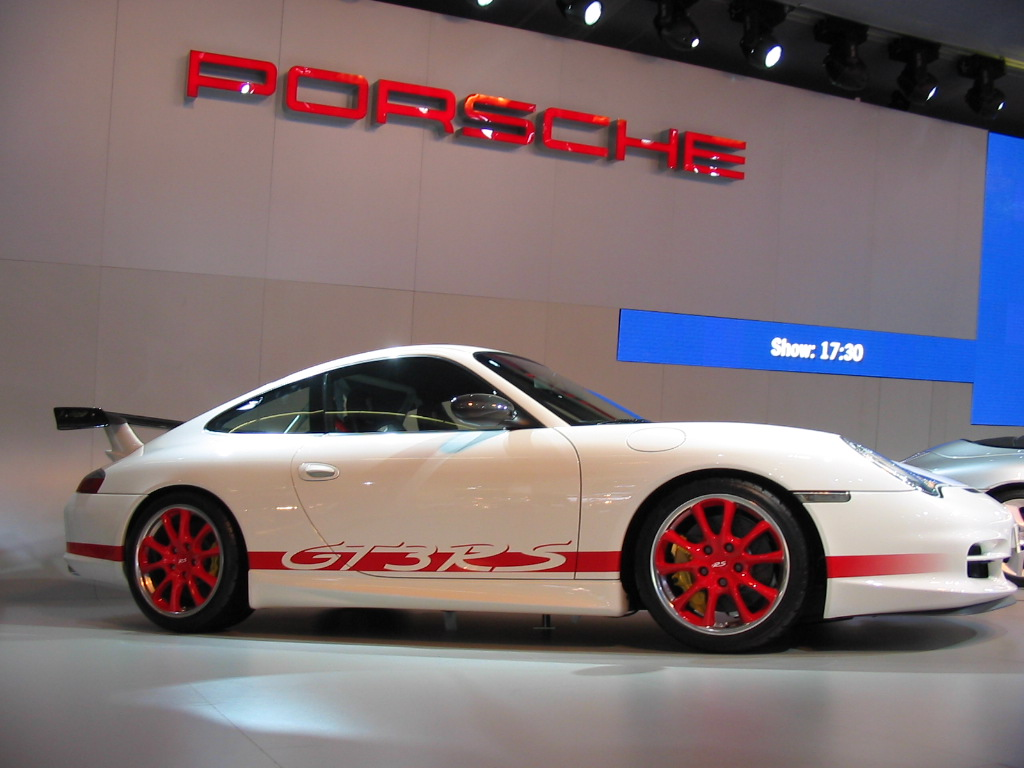
Porsche 996 GT3 RS at the 2003 Frankfurt Motor Show

==== 2003 concept cars ====
- Citroën C-Airlounge
- Ford Visos
- Ford Focus Station Wagon Restyling (2003)
- Lancia Fulvia Coupé Concept
- Mazda Kusabi
- Mitsubishi i
- Nissan Dunehawk
- Opel Insignia Concept
- Peugeot 407 Elixir
- Renault Be Bop
- Saab 9-3 Sport Hatch
- Škoda Roomster
- Suzuki Concept S2
- Toyota CS&S
- Volkswagen Concept R

=== 2005 ===
The exhibition focused strongly on future solutions such as hybrid, hydrogen, flex-fuel and SCR technologies for reducing NOx emissions. There were around 940,000 visitors to the 2005 show. The following introductions were made at the 2005 show:

- Audi Q7
- Audi A4 Cabriolet (facelift)
- Audi S6
- Bentley Azure
- Bufori MKIII La Joya
- Chevrolet Aveo sedan (T250) (European premier of facelift model)
- Daimler Super Eight
- Fiat Grande Punto
- Ford Galaxy
- Hyundai Getz (facelift)
- Honda Civic
- Jaguar XK
- Lamborghini Gallardo Spyder
- Mercedes-Benz S-Class (W221)
- Nissan Micra C+C
- Opel Vectra C (facelift)
- Opel Signum (facelift)
- Opel Astra TwinTop
- Peugeot 307 (facelift)
- Peugeot 407 Coupé
- Porsche Cayman
- Renault Clio
- Saab 9-5
- SEAT León
- Toyota RAV4
- Toyota Yaris
- Volkswagen Eos
- Volkswagen Golf R32
- Volvo C70

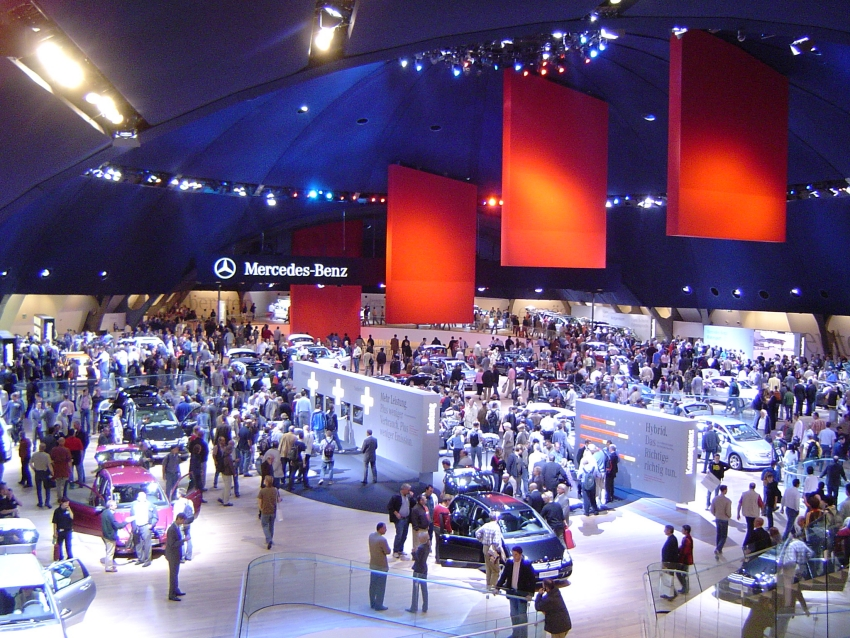
Mercedes-Benz at the 2005 Frankfurt Motor Show

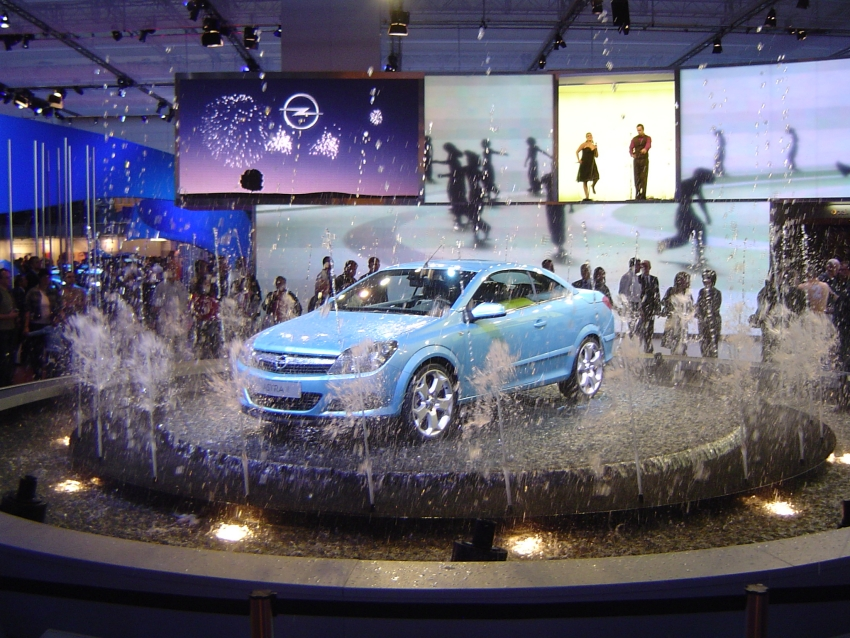
Opel Astra TwinTop at 2005 Frankfurt Motor Show

==== 2005 concept cars ====
- BMW Z4 Coupé
- Citroën C-SportLounge
- Ford Iosis
- Daihatsu HVS
- EDAG Roadster
- Fenomenon Stratos
- Ford SYNus
- Jeep Compass
- Jeep Patriot
- Karmann SUC
- Magna Steyr MILA
- Maybach Exelero
- Mazda Sassou
- Mercedes-Benz Vision R 63 AMG
- Mini Traveller
- Opel Antara GTC
- Peugeot 20Cup
- Peugeot Moovie
- Renault Egeus
- Smart Crosstown
- Toyota Endo
- Toyota i-unit
- Mitsubishi Concept Sportback

=== 2007 ===
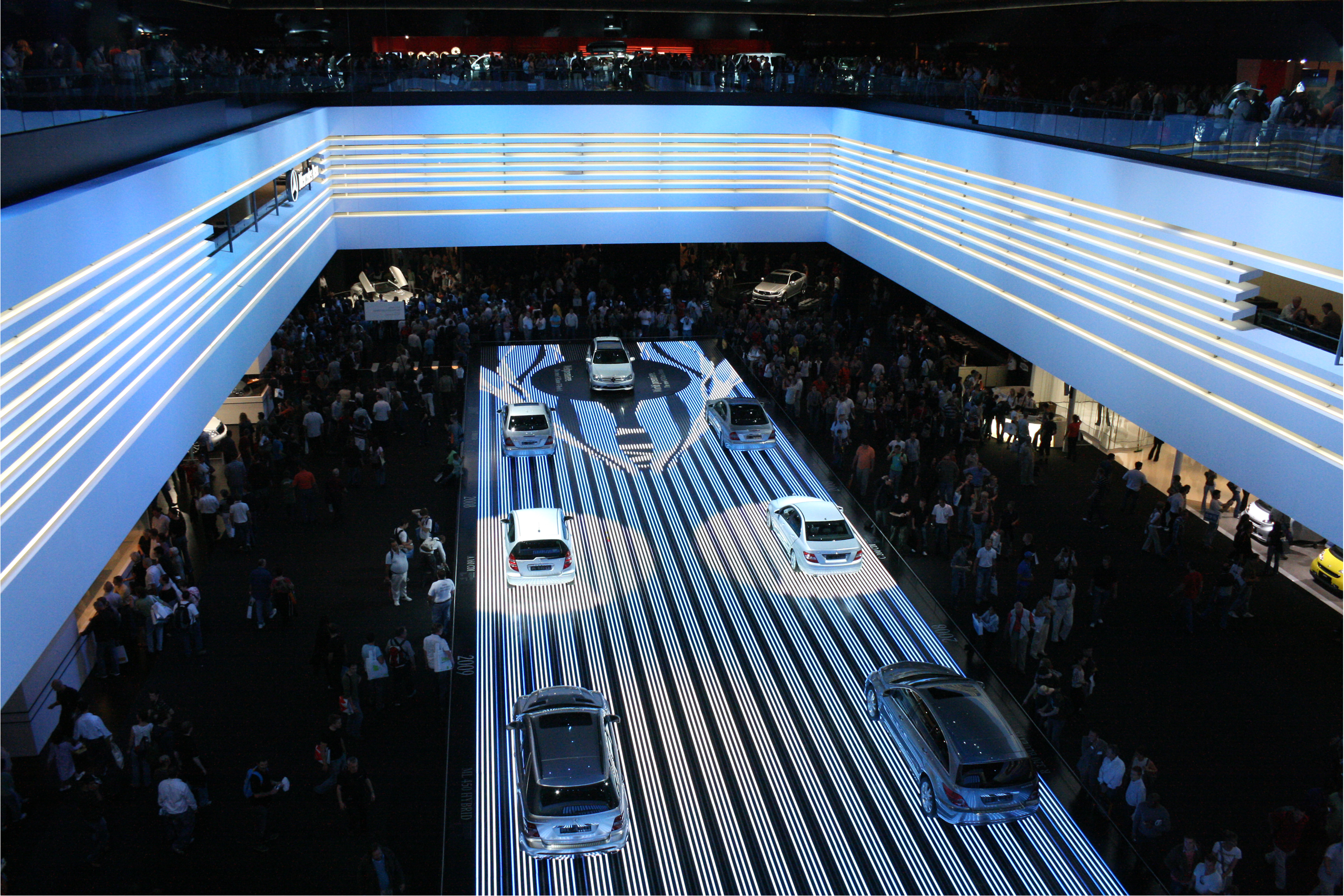
The Mercedes-Benz pavilion at the 2007 Frankfurt Motor Show

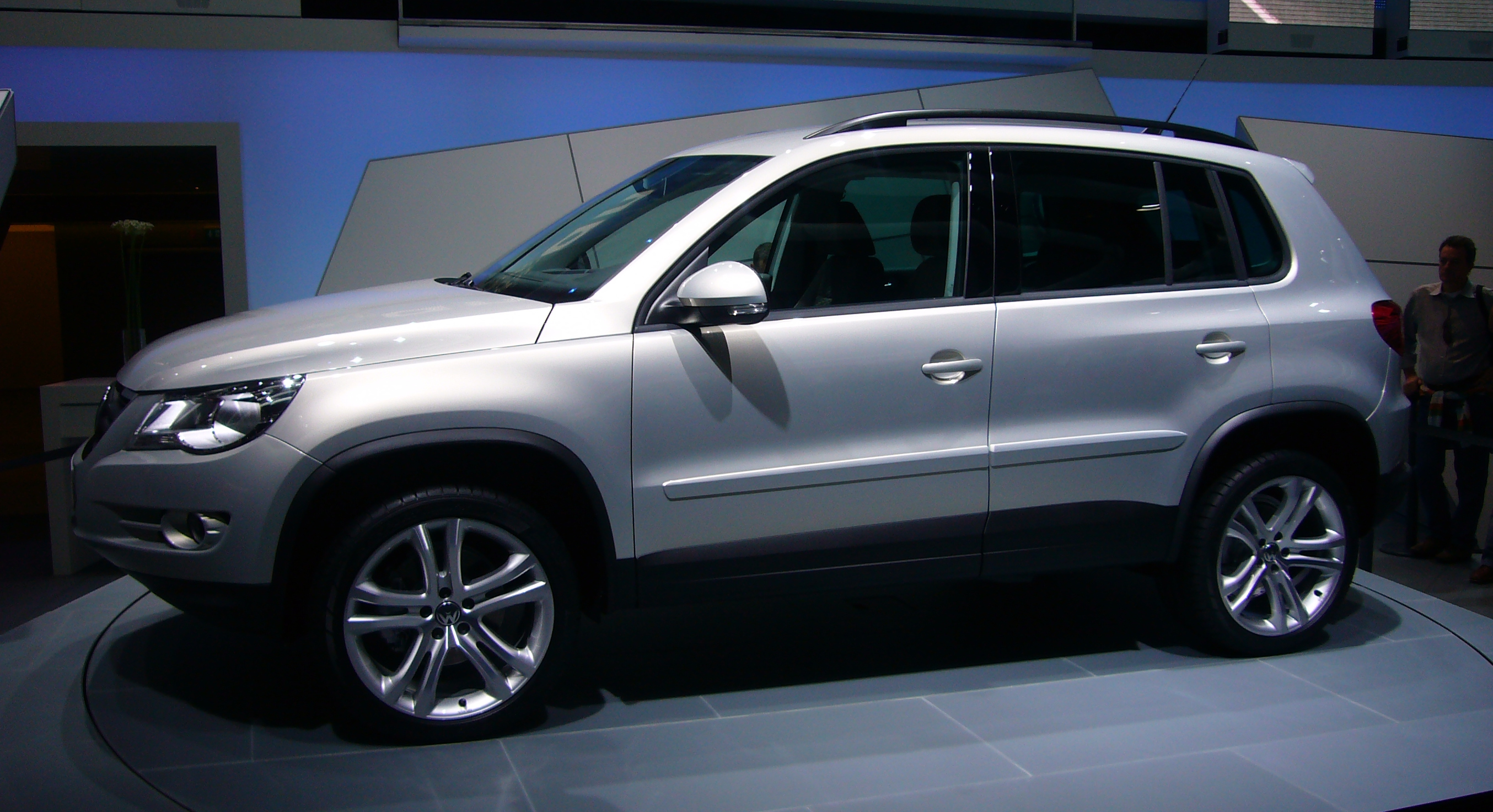
Volkswagen Tiguan at the 2007 Frankfurt Motor Show

The 2007 Frankfurt Motor Show's key theme was sustainable mobility.

The following introductions were presented at the 2007 show:

- Aston Martin DBS
- Aston Martin V8 Vantage N400
- Aston Martin DB9 LM
- Audi A4
- Audi RS6
- Audi A8 facelift
- Bentley Continental GT Speed facelift+power upgrade
- BMW 1 Series coupé
- BMW 6 Series facelift
- BMW M3 coupé
- BMW X6 concept
- Cadillac BLS Wagon
- Citroën C-Airscape
- Chevrolet Aveo hatchback (T250)
- Dodge Journey
- Ferrari 430 Scuderia
- Ford Focus (facelift)
- Ford Kuga
- Ford Verve concept – preview of 2008 Ford Fiesta
- Jaguar XF
- Jonway UFO
- Kia Kee concept
- Kia Eco Cee'd concept
- Kia Pro Cee'd
- Lamborghini Reventón
- Martin Motors CEO
- Mazda 6
- Maybach 62S
- Mercedes-Benz F700 concept
- Mercedes-Benz ML450 Bluetec Hybrid
- Mercedes-Benz S400 Bluetec
- Mini Clubman
- Opel Agila
- Peugeot 207 SW (estate)
- Peugeot 308
- Porsche 911 GT2 Model 997
- Porsche Cayenne GTS
- Renault Clio Estate
- Renault Laguna (new generation)
- Renault Sandero
- Saab 9-3 Turbo-X XWD a.k.a. Black Turbo.
- SEAT Tribu concept
- Subaru boxer-4 turbodiesel engine.
- Suzuki Splash
- Škoda Fabia Combi (new generation)
- Volkswagen up! concept
- Wiesmann GT MF5 (Wiesmann GT with the BMW M5 E60 S85 V10 engine)

==== Hybrids ====
European automakers demonstrated a new interest in hybrid and electric vehicles at the 2007 Frankfurt Motor Show. For example, Mercedes-Benz arrived at the show with seven hybrids, including a luxury sedan concept vehicle called the F 700, a 17-foot (5.2 m)-long car that achieves a fuel economy of 44.4 miles per gallon (mpg). The research vehicle features a homogenous charge compression ignition engine, a technology that produces the high fuel economy of a diesel engine from a clean-burning gasoline engine. Mercedes has also mated its clean-diesel engine to an electric motor, creating the Bluetec hybrid. The company plans to introduce a gasoline-fueled hybrid SUV and sedan in 2009, followed by two Bluetec hybrids in 2010, one of which will achieve 51 miles per gallon of diesel fuel. In addition, the Mercedes Car Group exhibited its smart car in three new incarnations: an electric-only vehicle and both diesel and gasoline versions with "micro hybrid drive", a belt-driven starter and alternator that allows the engine to shut off at stops. See the DaimlerChrysler press releases about the auto show and the F700.

Opel, a subsidiary of General Motors, unveiled the Flextreme, a plug-in hybrid that can travel 34 miles (55 km) on its lithium-ion battery before a small diesel engine starts charging the battery. Opel also unveiled the Corsa Hybrid, a coupe that combines a belt-driven starter and alternator with a lithium-ion battery.

Volvo Cars, a division of Ford Motor Company, exhibited a plug-in hybrid with motors in each of the wheels. The Volvo ReCharge can travel about 60 miles (97 km) on battery power alone, using a lithium-polymer battery pack that can be recharged in a standard outlet.

The Citroën C-Cactus regular diesel-electric hybrid vehicle debuted at the 2007 Frankfurt Motor Show.

=== 2009 ===
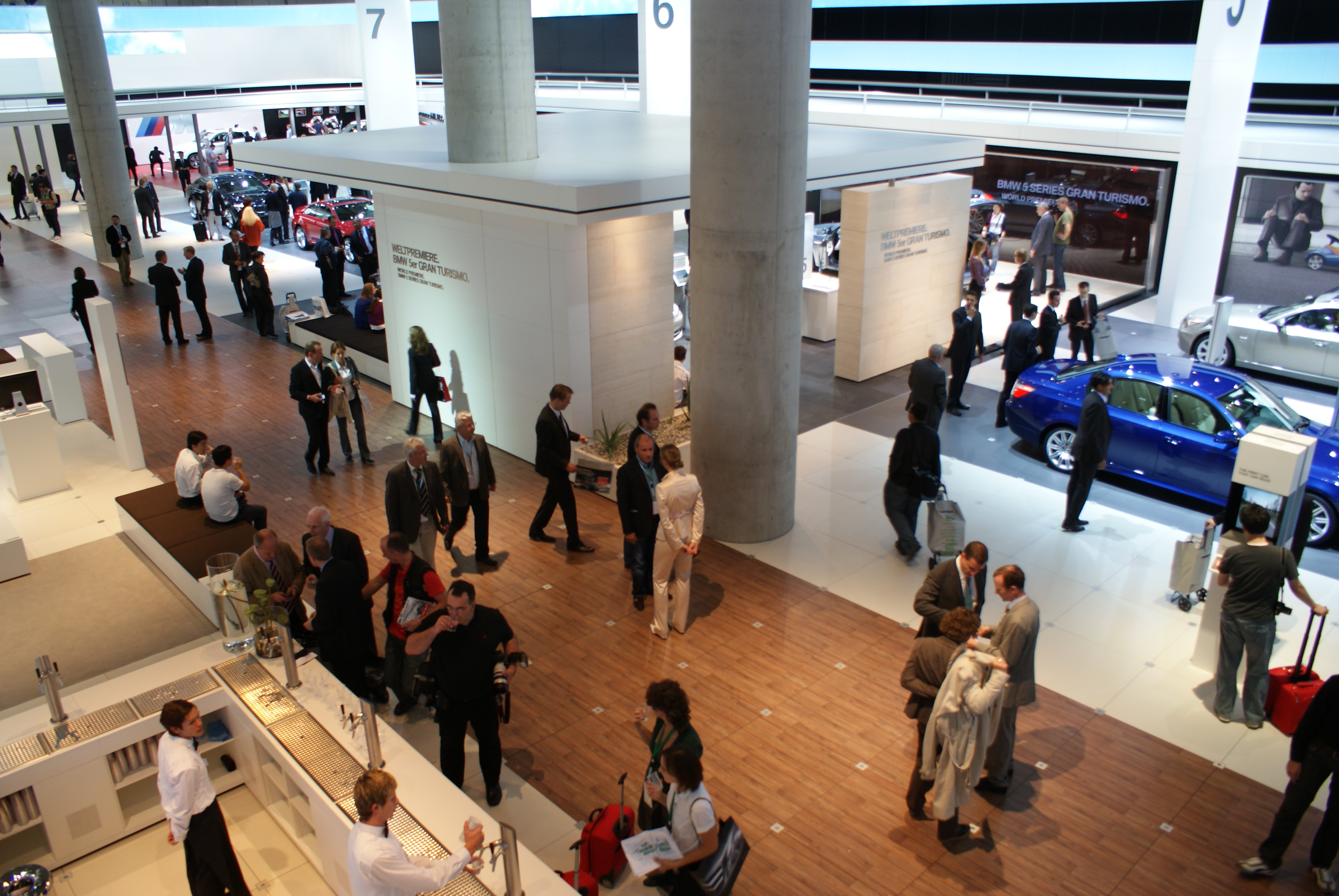
Inside the BMW pavilion at the IAA 2009

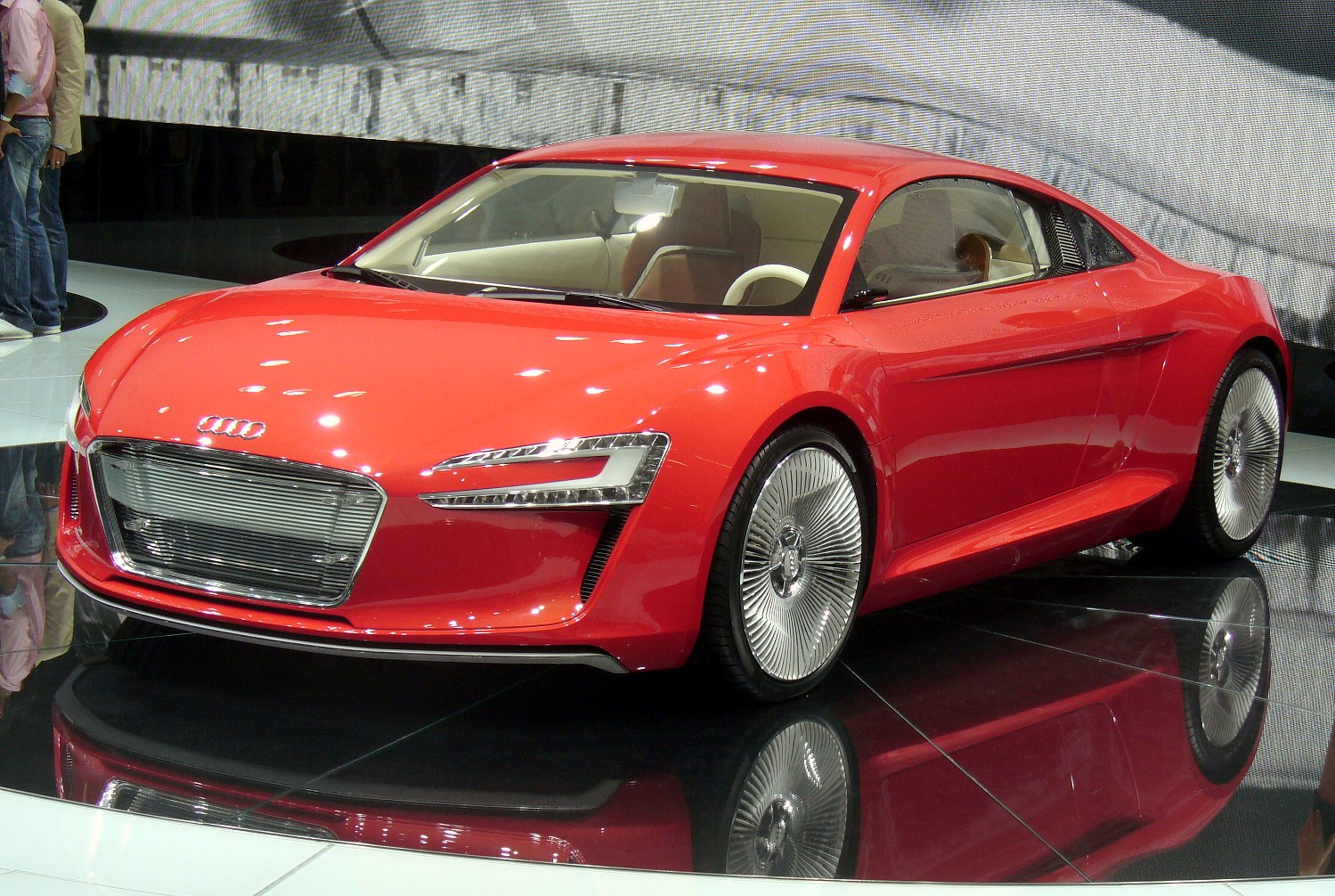
Audi e-tron at the 2009 Frankfurt Motor Show

The theme of the 2009 Frankfurt Motor Show can best be summed up in one word: "electrification." Virtually every manufacturer has unveiled a vehicle using the latest battery technology.

The following introductions were presented at the 2009 show:

==== Production cars ====
- Alfa Romeo MiTo Quadrifoglio Verde
- Aston Martin Rapide
- 2010 Audi A5 Sportback
- 2010 Audi R8 Spyder
- 2010 Bentley Mulsanne
- 2010 BMW 5 Series Gran Turismo
- 2010 BMW 740d
- 2010 BMW X1
- 2010 BMW ActiveHybrid X6
- 2010 BMW ActiveHybrid 7
- Citroën C3
- Citroën DS3
- 2010 Dodge Caliber
- 2010 Ferrari 458 Italia
- Fiat 500 Abarth by Ferrari
- Fiat Punto Evo
- Fiat Qubo Treking
- 2011 Ford C-Max
- 2011 Ford Grand C-Max
- G-Wix electric cars
- 2010 Honda CR-V
- 2010 Hyundai i10 Electric
- 2010 Hyundai ix35
- Hyundai Santa Fe
- 2010 Jaguar XJ
- 2010 Koenigsegg CCXR Trevita
- 2010 Kia Cee'd (facelift)
- 2010 Kia Venga
- 2010 Kia Sorento
- Kia Forte LPI Hybrid (European introduction)
- Kia cee'd Hybrid
- Kia Sorento Hybrid
- Kia Venga MPV
- 2010 Lamborghini Reventón Roadster
- Lexus IS-F sport package
- Lotus Elise Club Racer
- Lotus Evora Club Racer
- 2011 Maserati GranCabrio
- Mazda CX-7
- 2010 Mercedes-Benz E-Class Estate
- 2010 Mercedes-Benz SLS AMG
- 2010 Opel Astra
- 2010 Peugeot RCZ
- 2010 Peugeot 5008
- 2011 Peugeot iOn
- 2010 Porsche 911 Sport Classic & Turbo
- 2010 Porsche 911 GT3 Cup & RS
- 2010 Porsche Panamera (European introduction)
- Range Rover Sport
- 2010 REVA NXR and NXG
- Rolls-Royce Ghost
- 2010 Saab 9-5
- SEAT León Cupra R
- Škoda Superb Estate
- 2010 Subaru Legacy (European introduction)
- 2010 Subaru Outback (European introduction)
- 2010 Toyota Land Cruiser
- 2010 Volkswagen California
- 2010 Volkswagen Caravelle
- 2010 Volkswagen Golf BlueMotion
- 2010 Volkswagen Passat BlueMotion
- 2010 Volkswagen Polo 3dr and GTI
- 2010 Volkswagen Polo BlueMotion
- 2010 Volkswagen Golf R
- 2010 Volkswagen Transporter
- 2011 Volvo C30
- 2011 Volvo C70
- 2010 Volvo XC60 R-Design

==== 2009 concept cars ====
- Audi e-Tron
- BMW Vision Efficient Dynamics
- Bugatti 16C Galibier (previous called Bugatti Bordeaux)
- Citroën Revolte
- Hyundai ix Metro
- Lexus LF-Ch
- Mazda MX-5 Superlight
- Mercedes-Benz Vision S 500 Plug-in Hybrid
- Mini Coupé and Roadster
- Peugeot BB1
- Renault Fluence Z.E.
- Renault Kangoo Z.E.
- Renault Twizy Z.E.
- Renault Zoe Z.E.
- SEAT Ibz concept
- Tesla Model S
- Trabant nT
- Toyota Auris HSD Full Hybrid Concept
- Toyota iQ Sport
- Toyota Prius Plug-In Hybrid Concept
- Volkswagen E-Up
- Volkswagen L1

=== 2011 ===
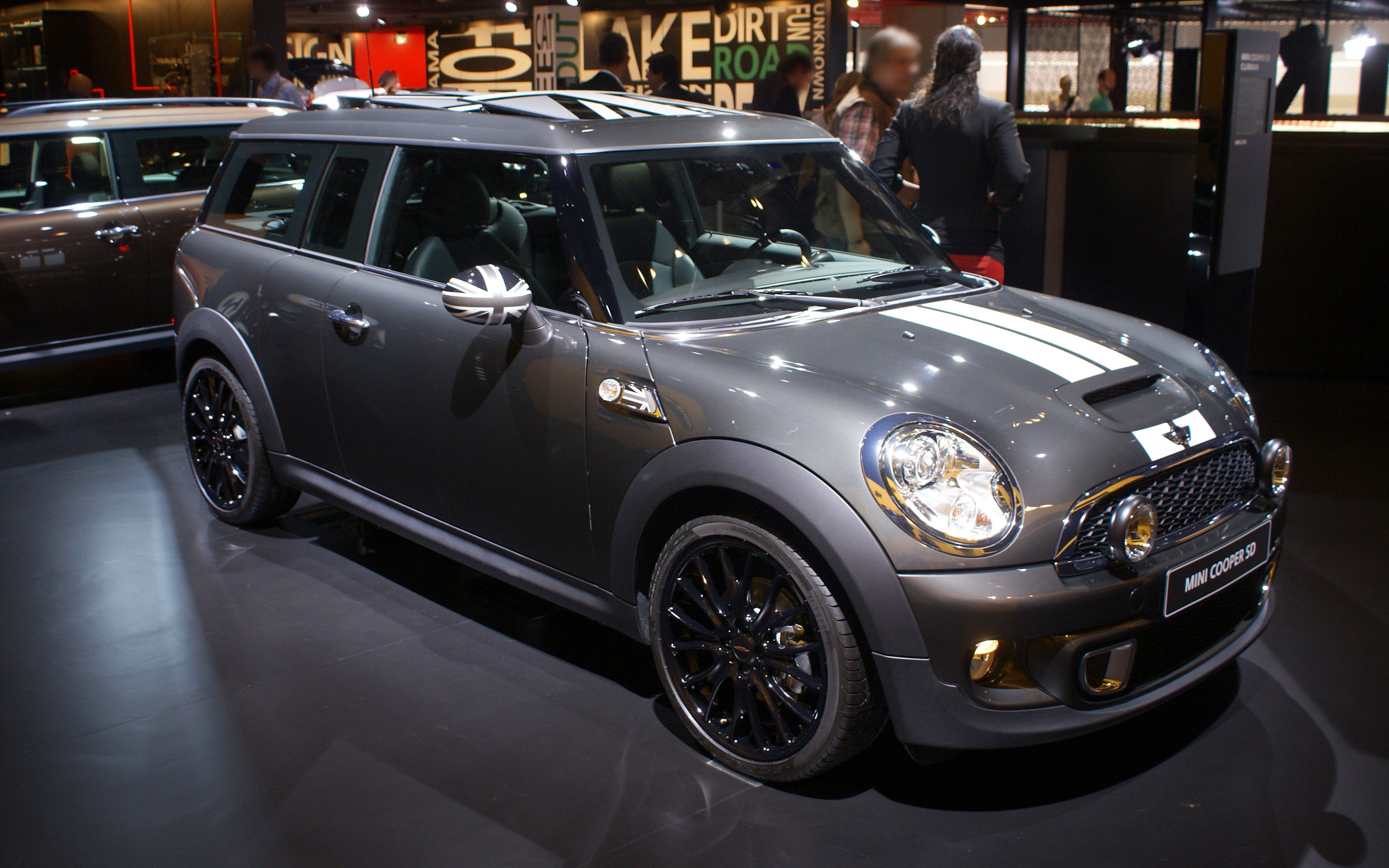
Mini Clubman

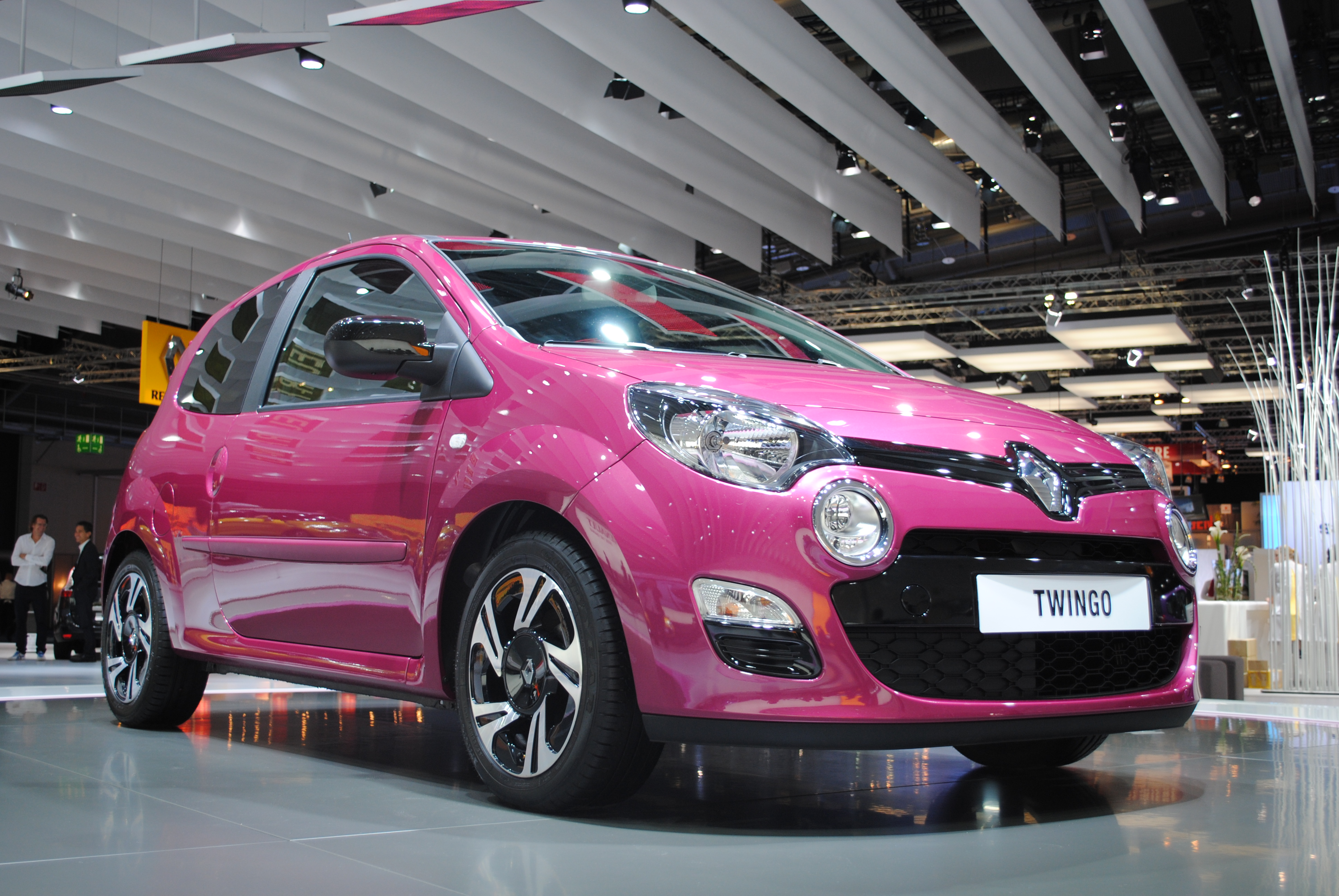
Renault Twingo

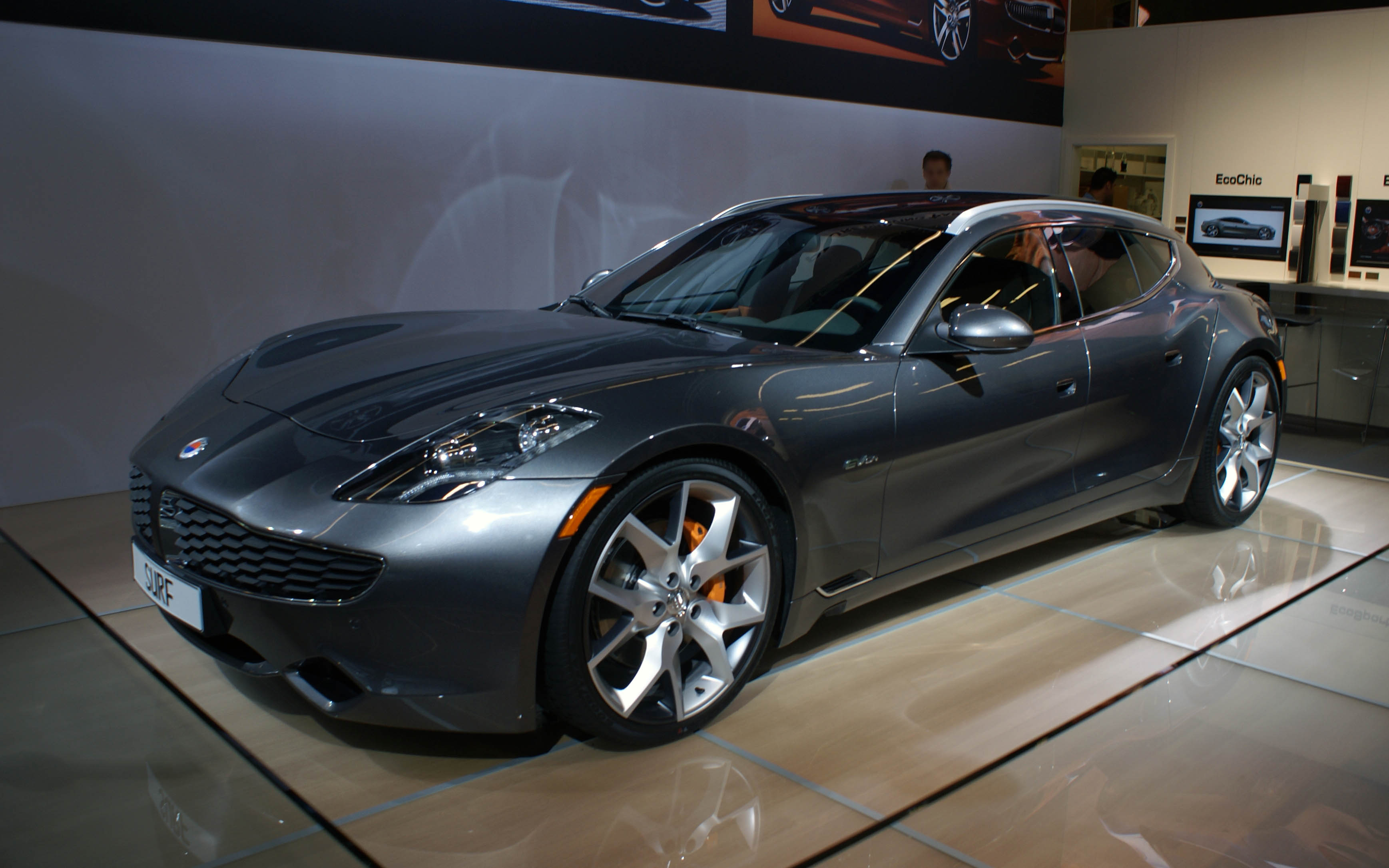
Fisker Surf

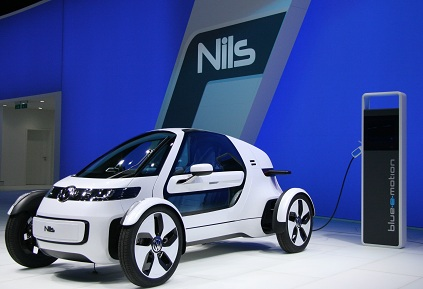
Volkswagen Nils

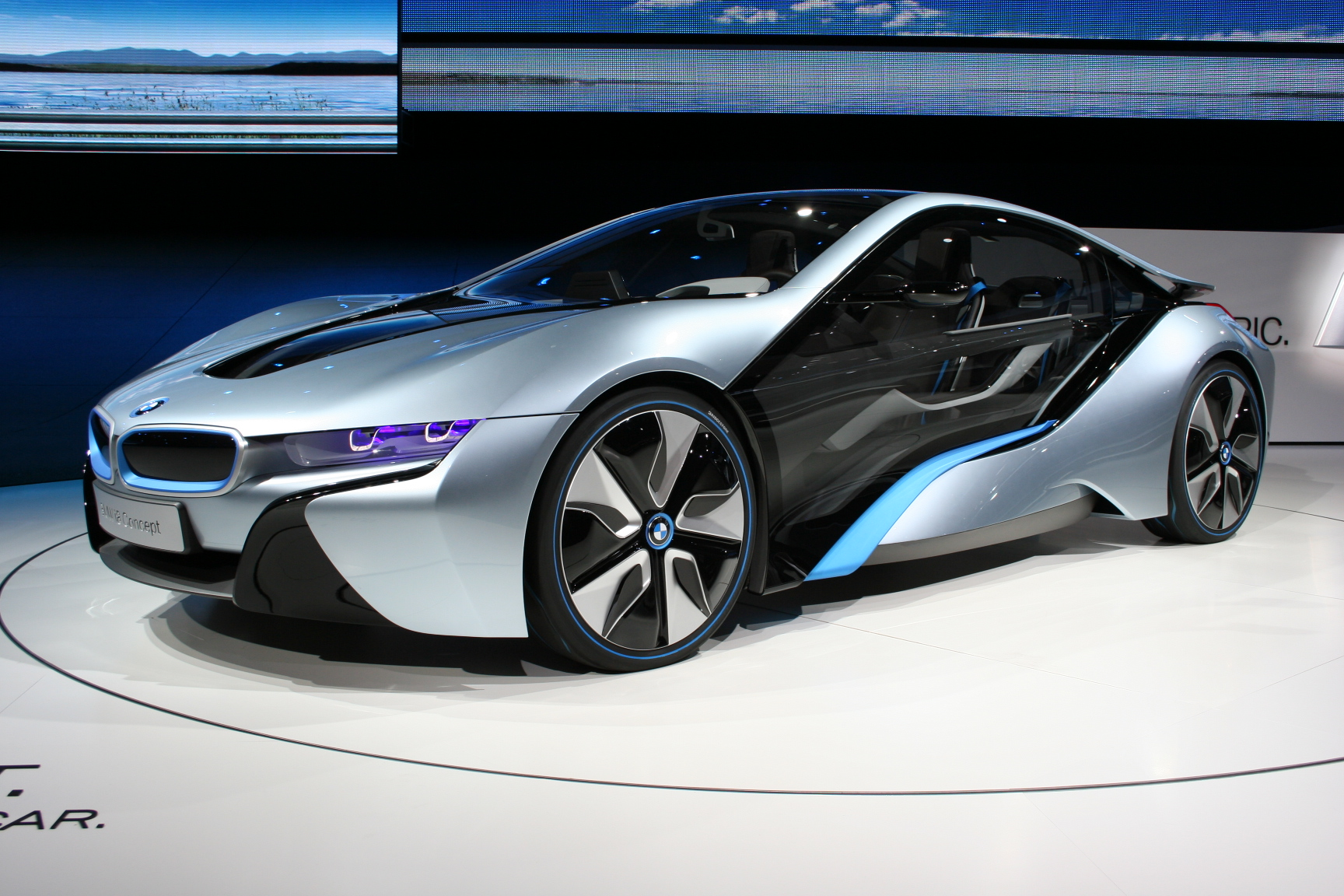
BMW i8

The 2011 show was held from 13 to 25 September. The 64th edition of the show included 1,012 exhibitors from 32 countries and was attended by more than 928,000 visitors from 105 countries, 36% of them being trade visitors, among those 80% from the automotive industry, plus more than 12'000 accredited journalists from 98 countries. 183 world premieres were unveiled.

==== Production cars ====
- 2012 Abarth 695 Competizione
- 2012 Alfa Romeo MiTo 0.9 TwinAir 85
- 2011 Alpina B6 Biturbo cabriolet
- 2012 Aston Martin DBS Carbon Edition
- 2012 Audi A5/S5 (facelift)
- 2012 Audi S6
- 2012 Audi S7
- 2012 Audi S8
- 2012 Audi R8 GT Spyder
- 2012 Bentley Continental GTC
- 2012 BMW 1
- 2012 BMW M5
- 2012 Chevrolet Camaro (European version)
- 2012 Chevrolet Malibu (European version)
- 2012 Citroën DS5
- 2012 Ferrari 458 Spider
- 2012 Fiat Panda
- 2012 Ford Fiesta ECOnetic
- 2012 Ford Focus ST (production version)
- 2011 Honda Civic (European version)
- 2012 Hyundai i30
- 2012 Jaguar XF
- 2012 Jeep Wrangler 3.6 V6
- Kia K9
- 2012 Kia Rio 3-door
- 2012 Lamborghini Gallardo LP570-4
- 2012 Lancia Flavia Cabrio
- 2012 Lancia Thema
- 2012 Lancia Voyager
- 2013 Lexus GS 350
- 2013 Lotus Exige S
- 2012 Mazda CX-5
- 2012 Mercedes-Benz B-Class
- Mia electric
- Mini Coupé
- 2012 Opel/Vauxhall Astra GTC
- 2012 Opel/Vauxhall Combo
- 2012 Opel/Vauxhall Zafira Tourer
- 2012 Peugeot 508 RXH Diesel Hybrid
- 2012 Porsche 911 Carrera
- 2011 Radical Sportscars SR3 SL
- 2012 Renault Koleos (facelift)
- 2012 Renault Twingo (facelift)
- 2012 SEAT Exeo (facelift)
- 2012 smart fortwo electric
- 2012 Subaru XV
- 2012 Suzuki Swift Sport
- 2012 Toyota Avensis (facelift)
- 2012 Toyota Prius+ (European version)
- 2012 Toyota Yaris
- 2012 Volkswagen up!
- Yo-Mobil

==== 2011 concept cars ====
- Alfa Romeo 4C
- Audi A2 Concept
- Audi Urban Concept
- Audi Urban Spyder Concept
- BMW i3
- BMW i8
- Chevrolet Miray
- Citroën Tubik
- Eterniti Motors Hemera
- Fisker Surf
- Ford Evos
- Ford Fiesta ST Concept
- Infiniti FX Sebastian Vettel Concept
- Jaguar C-X16
- Kia GT Concept
- Land Rover DC100
- Maserati Kubang
- Mercedes-Benz B-Class E-CELL Plus Concept
- Mercedes-Benz F125
- Mitsubishi PX-MiEV
- Opel RAK e
- Peugeot HX1
- Renault Frendzy Electric Concept
- Rimac Concept One Electric Supercar
- SEAT IBL
- Skoda Mission L
- Smart forvision
- SsangYong XUV-1
- Volkswagen Beetle R Concept
- Volkswagen Buggy up!
- Volkswagen Nils
- Volvo Concept You

=== 2013 ===
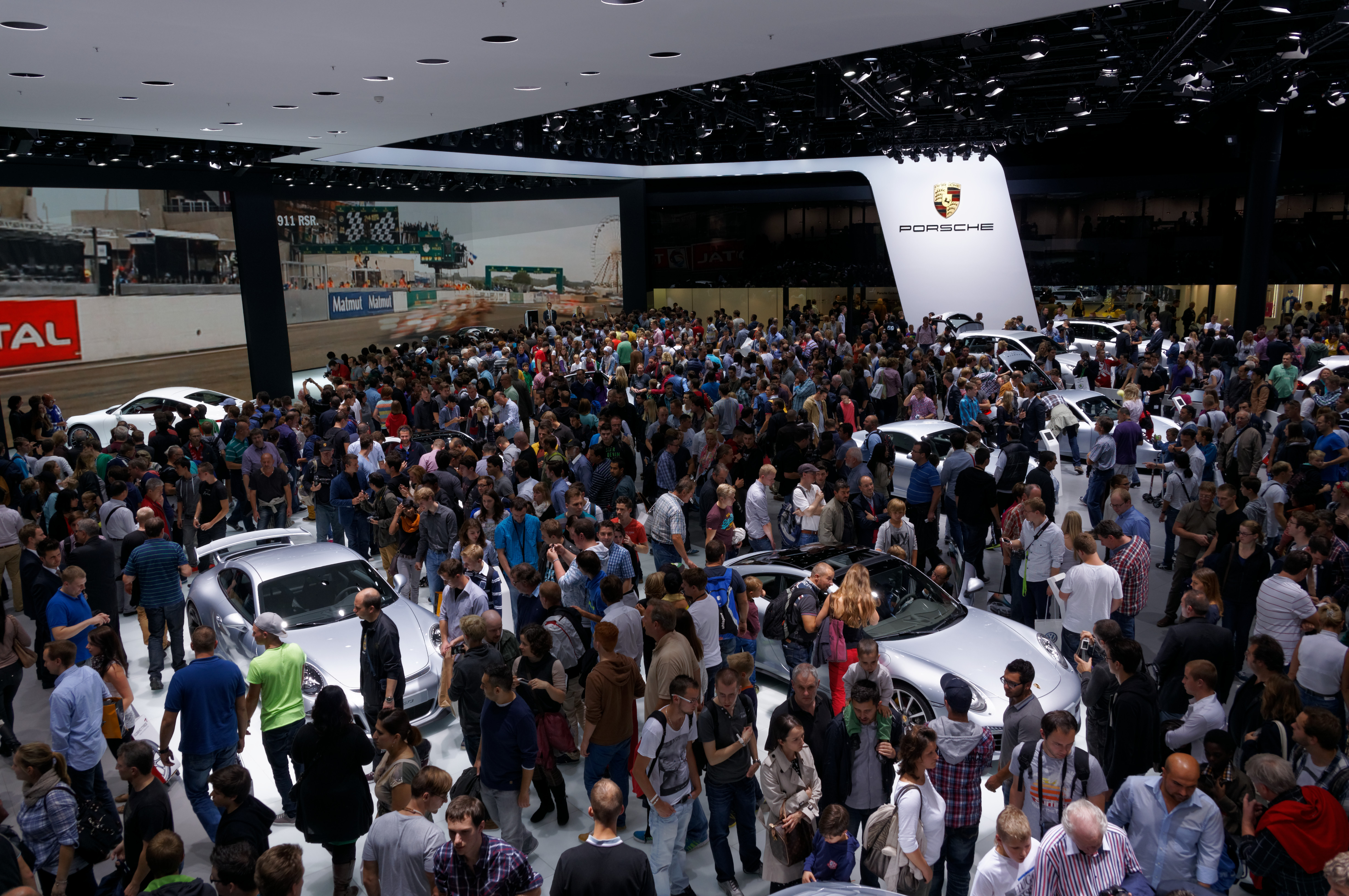
Inside the Porsche pavilion at the IAA 2013

The 2013 show took place from 10 to 22 September.

Nissan introduced a "smart watch" that measures the user's heart rate, temperature and other biometrics. It is also able to keep a watch on car data like fuel efficiency and average speed. It was developed by Nissan's Nismo laboratory. They currently capture live biometric and telematics data from Nissan racing cars and their drivers.

==== Production cars ====
- Abarth 595 50 Anniversario
- Abarth 695 Tributo Maserati
- 2014 Alfa Romeo Giulietta
- Alfa Romeo MiTo
- Aston Martin Vanquish Volante
- Audi A8/S8
- Audi A3/S3 Cabriolet
- Audi A3 Ultra
- Bentley Continental GT V8 S
- BMW 5 Series
- BMW X5 (F15)
- BMW i3
- BMW i8
- BMW 4 Coupé
- Bugatti Veyron Grand Sport Vitesse Jean Bugatti
- Caterham Seven 165
- 2014 Chevrolet Cruze
- Chevrolet Camaro
- Citroën Grand C4 Picasso
- Citroën DS3 Cabrio Racing
- Dacia Duster
- Ferrari 458 Speciale
- Fiat Panda 4x4 Antartica
- Fiat 500C GQ
- Ford Focus EcoBoost
- Honda Civic Tourer
- Hyundai i10
- Jaguar XJ/XJR
- Jeep Wrangler Polar
- Kia Optima (facelift)
- Kia Soul (European introduction)
- Lamborghini Gallardo LP570-4 Squadra Corse
- Lancia Voyager S
- 2014 Lancia Delta
- Land Rover Discovery
- Lexus GS 300h
- Maserati Ghibli
- 2014 Mazda3
- Mercedes-Benz S63 AMG (W222)
- Mercedes-Benz S 500 Plug-in Hybrid
- Mercedes-Benz GLA-Class
- Nissan Micra (European facelift)
- 2014 Nissan X-Trail
- Opel Adam White & Black Link
- 2014 Opel Insignia facelift & Country Tourer
- Peugeot 308
- Peugeot 3008 (facelift)
- Peugeot RCZ R
- Porsche 918 Spyder
- Porsche 911 Turbo/Turbo S
- Renault Koleos (facelift)
- Renault Latitude
- Renault Mégane (facelift)
- SEAT Leon ST
- Škoda Octavia vRS
- Škoda Rapid Spaceback
- 2014 Škoda Yeti facelift
- Suzuki Swift Sport
- Volkswagen e-Up!
- Seat Leon ST
- Volkswagen e-Golf
- Volkswagen Golf R

==== 2013 concept cars ====
- Audi Nanuk Quattro
- Audi Sport Quattro
- Cadillac Elmiraj
- Citroën Cactus Concept
- Ford S-Max
- Ford Mondeo Vignale Concept
- Infiniti Q30
- Jaguar C-X17
- Kia Niro
- Lexus LF-NX
- Mercedes-Benz S-Class Coupé
- Mini Vision Concept
- Opel Monza Concept
- Peugeot 308 R Concept
- Smart fourjoy
- Renault Initiale Paris
- Subaru WRX Concept
- Volkswagen Golf Sportsvan
- Volvo Concept Coupé

=== 2015 ===
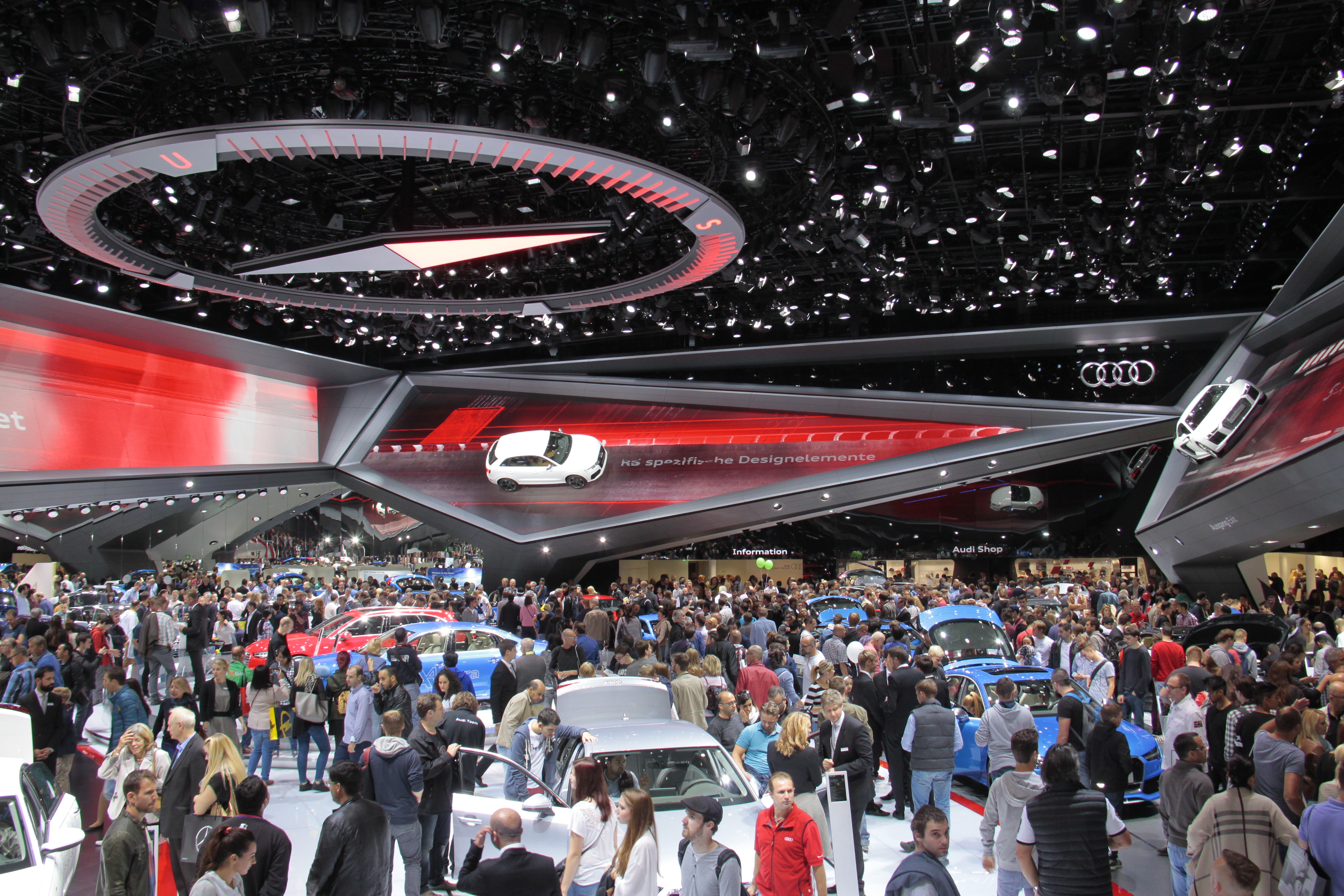
Audi pavilion at IAA 2015

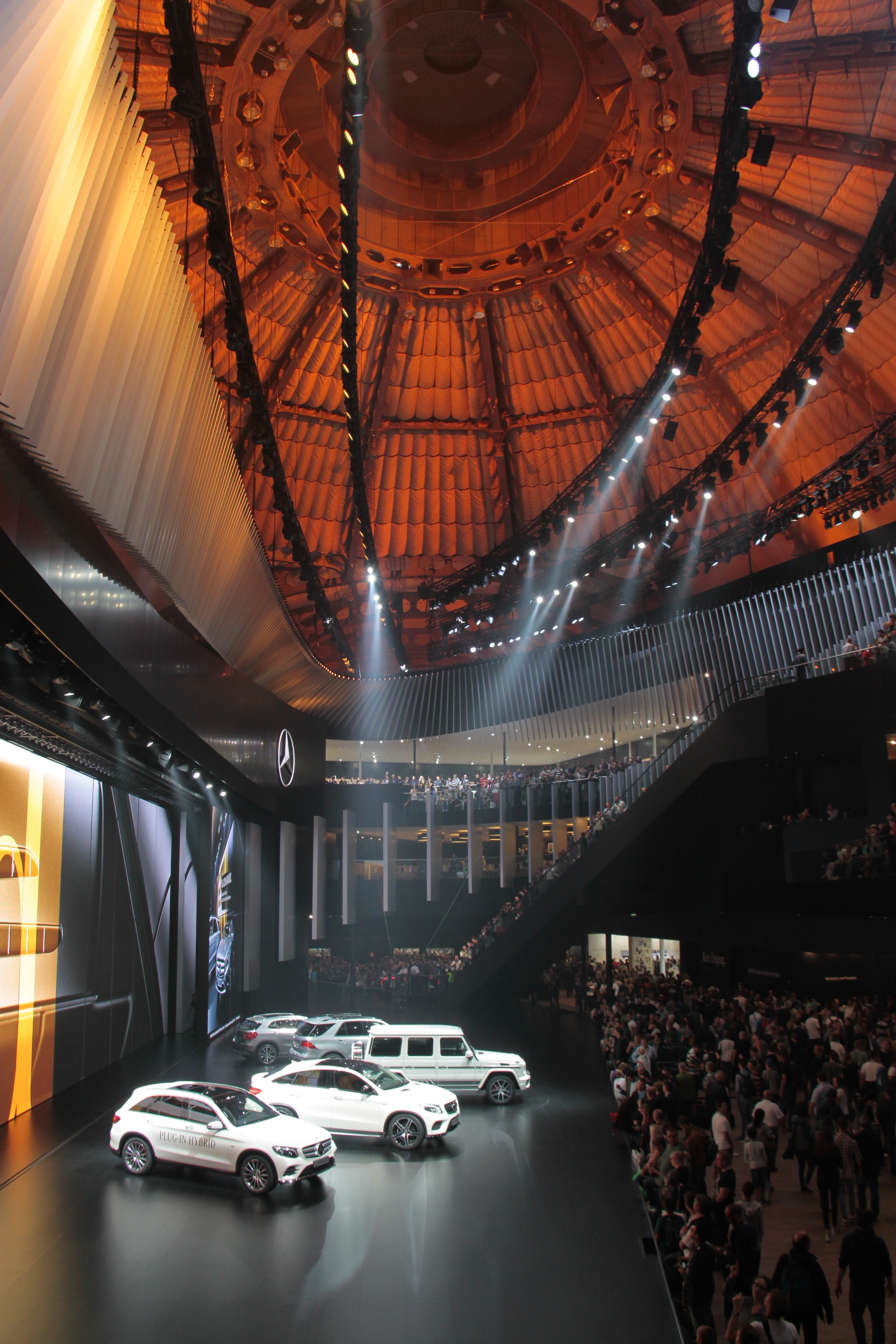
Mercedes-Benz pavilion at IAA 2015. Onstage is the marque's offroad and SUV range of vehicles.

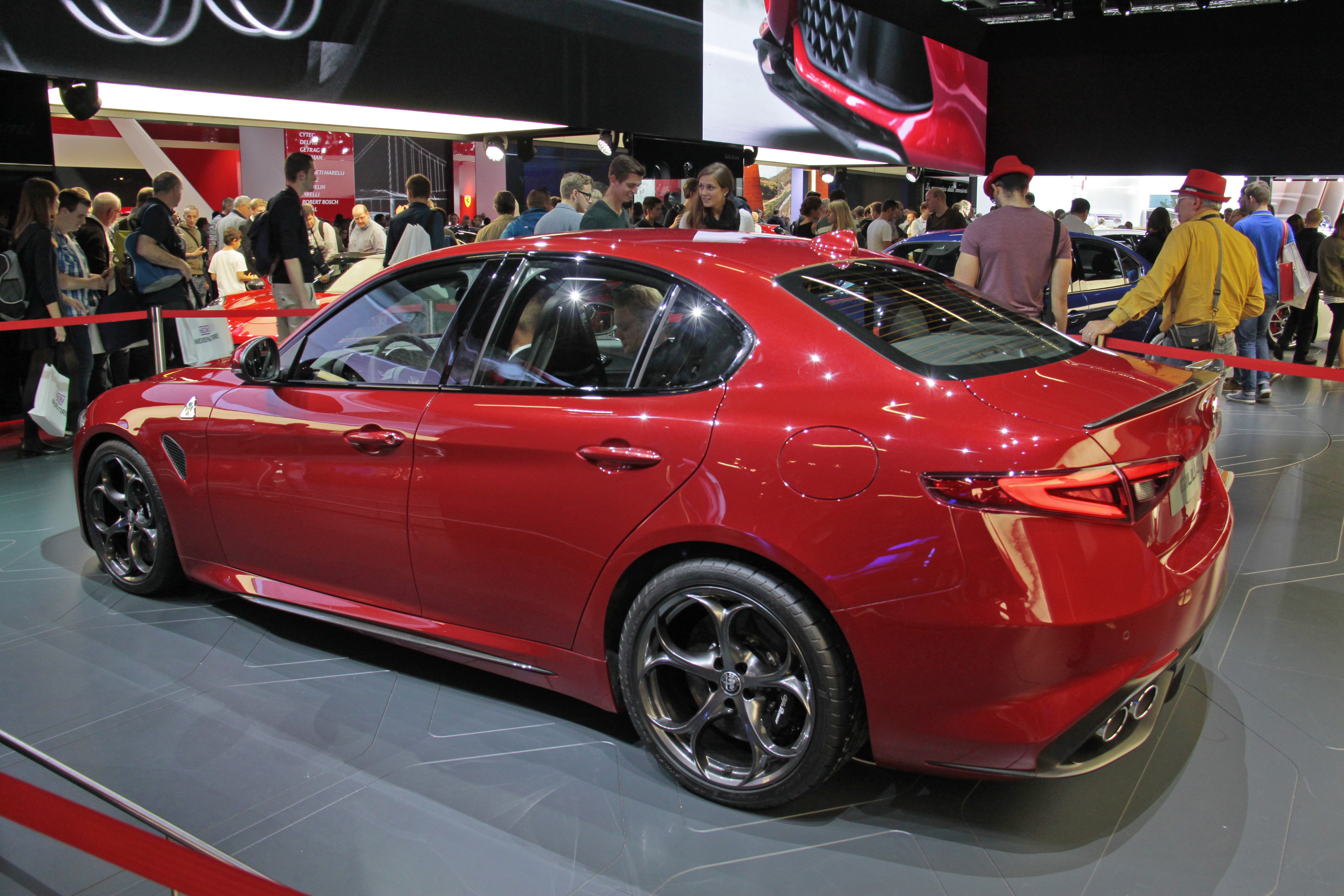
Alfa Romeo Giulia at 2015 IAA

The 2015 show took place from 17 to 27 September.

==== Production cars ====
- Alfa Romeo Giulia Quadrifoglio
- Audi A4
- Audi S4
- Bentley Bentayga
- BMW 3 Series (Facelift)
- BMW 7 Series
- BMW X1 (F48)
- BMW M6 GT3
- BMW M6 Competition Package
- DS 4 (Facelift)
- DS 4 Crossback
- Ferrari 488 Spider
- Fiat 500 (Facelift)
- Ford Ecosport (Facelift)
- Ford Edge (International specs)
- Ford Kuga (Facelift)
- Hyundai i20 WRC
- Infiniti Q30
- Jaguar F-Pace
- Kia Sportage
- Kia cee'd (Facelift)
- Lamborghini Aventador LP 750-4 SuperVeloce Roadster
- Lamborghini Huracán LP 610-4 Spyder
- Mercedes-Benz C-Class Coupe
- Mercedes C63/C63 S AMG Coupe
- Mercedes-Benz C63 AMG Coupe Edition 1
- Mercedes-AMG C-Coupé DTM (W205)
- Mercedes-Benz S-Class Convertible
- Mini Clubman
- Nissan NP300 Navara
- Opel Astra
- Porsche 991 (Facelift)
- Renault Mégane
- Renault Talisman
- Rolls-Royce Dawn
- SEAT Ibiza Cupra (Facelift)
- SEAT Leon Cupra 290
- Smart Fortwo Cabriolet
- Suzuki Baleno
- Toyota Prius
- Volkswagen Golf GTI Clubsport
- Volkswagen Tiguan

==== 2015 concept cars ====
- Audi e-tron Quattro concept
- Bugatti Vision Gran Turismo
- Citroën Cactus M
- Honda Project 2&4
- Hyundai N 2025 Vision Gran Turismo
- Mazda Koeru
- Mercedes-Benz Concept IAA
- Nissan Gripz
- Peugeot Fractal
- Porsche Mission E
- SsangYong XAV-Adventure
- SEAT Leon Sport Cross
- Toyota C-HR
- Volkswagen Golf GTE Sport

=== 2017 ===
The 2017 show took place from 14 to 24 September, with press days on the 12th and 13th.

==== Production cars ====
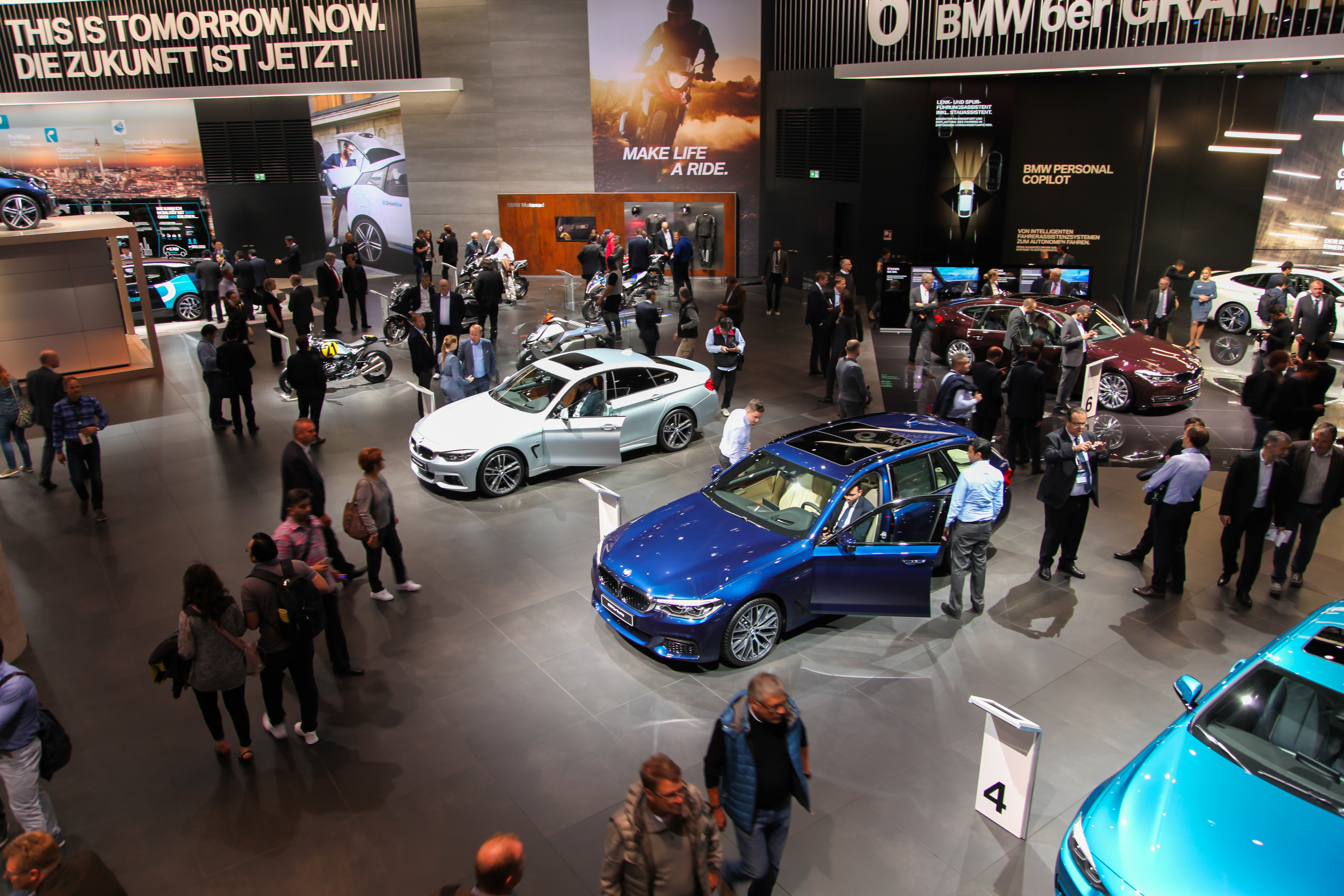
View to the BMW pavilion 2017

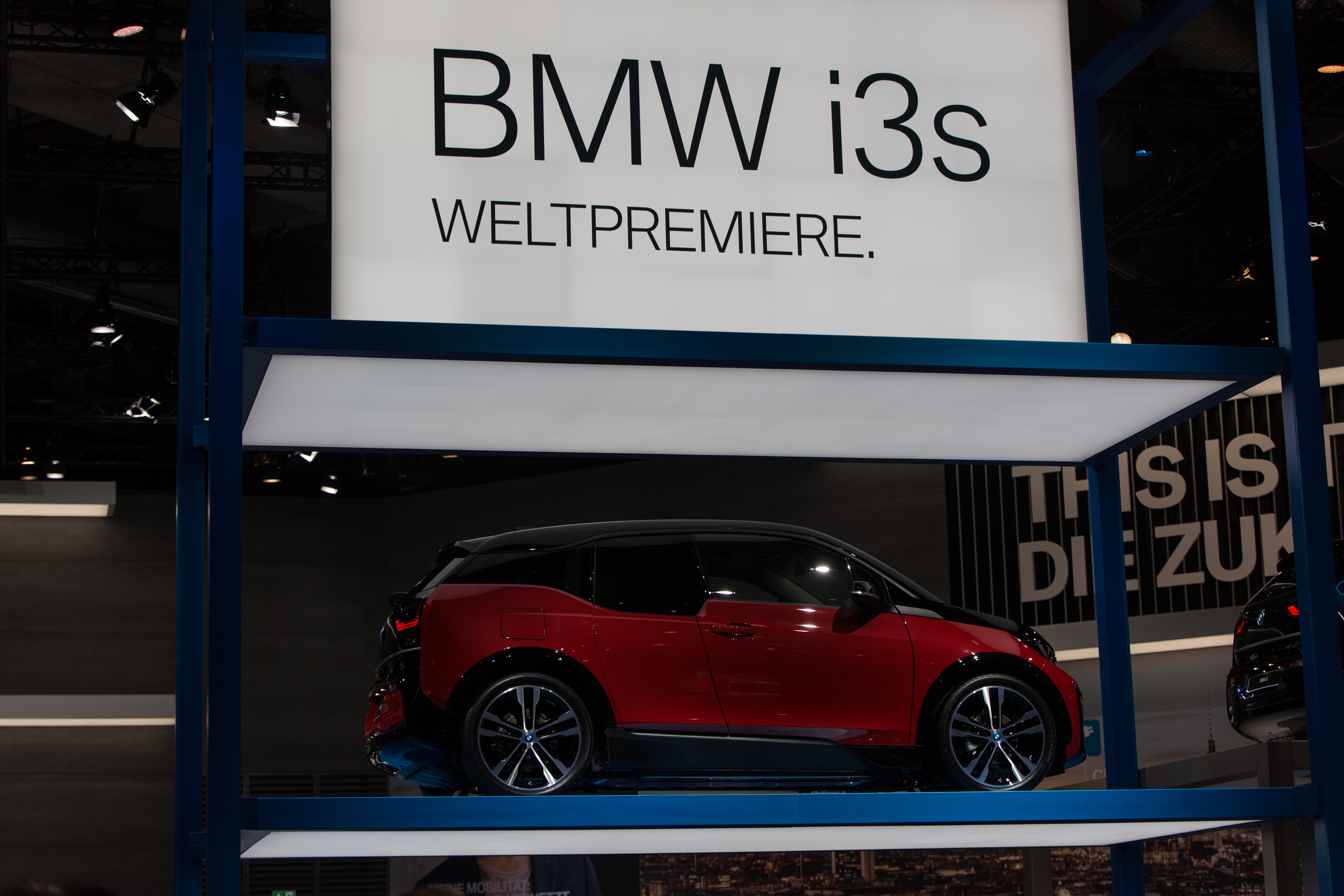
World premiere of the BMW i3s

- Alpina D5 S
- Audi RS4 Avant
- Audi A8
- Bentley Continental GT
- BMW 6 Series GT
- BMW X3
- BMW i3 (facelift)
- BMW M5
- Brabus-Mercedes E63 AMG S
- Citroën C3 Aircross
- Dacia Duster
- Ferrari Portofino
- Ford EcoSport (facelift) (European debut)
- Ford Mustang (facelift) (European debut)
- Honda Jazz (facelift)
- Honda CR-V (European debut)
- Hyundai i30 Fastback and N variants
- Hyundai Kona
- Jaguar E-Pace
- Kia Picanto X-Line
- Kia Sorento (facelift)
- Kia Stonic
- Lamborghini Aventador S Roadster
- Land Rover Discovery SVX
- Lexus CT200h (second facelift)
- Lexus NX (facelift)
- Mercedes-Benz GLC-Class F-Cell
- Mercedes-Benz S-Class Coupe and Cabriolet (facelifts)
- Mercedes-Benz X-Class
- Opel Grandland X
- Opel Insignia GSi and Country Tourer variants
- Porsche 911 GT2 RS
- Porsche 911 GT3 Touring Package
- Porsche Cayenne
- Renaultsport Mégane
- Rolls-Royce Phantom VIII
- SEAT Arona
- SEAT Leon Cupra R
- Škoda Karoq
- Subaru Impreza (European debut)
- Suzuki Swift Sport
- Volkswagen Polo MK6
- Volkswagen T-Roc

==== 2017 concept cars ====
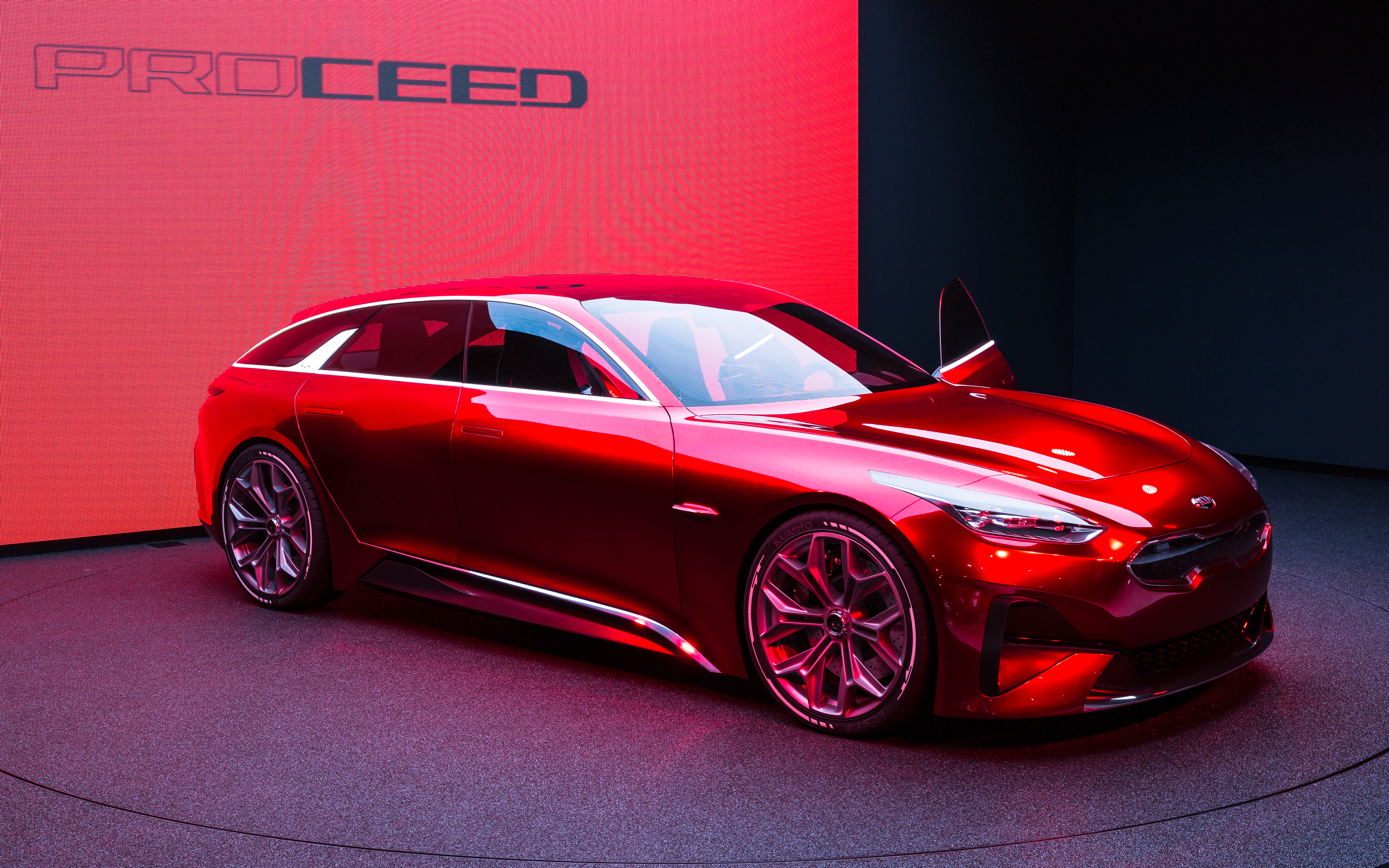
Kia ProCeed concept

- Aspark Owl
- Audi AI:CON
- Audi Elaine
- BMW i Vision Dynamics Concept
- BMW Concept X7 iPerformance
- Borgward Isabella Concept
- Honda Urban EV Concept
- Kia Proceed concept
- Mercedes EQ A concept
- Mercedes-AMG Project One
- Mini Electric Concept
- Mini John Cooper Works GP Concept
- Smart Vision EQ Fortwo
- Volkswagen I.D. Crozz

=== 2019 ===
The 2019 show took place from 12 to 22 September, with press days on the 10th and 11th.

==== Production cars ====
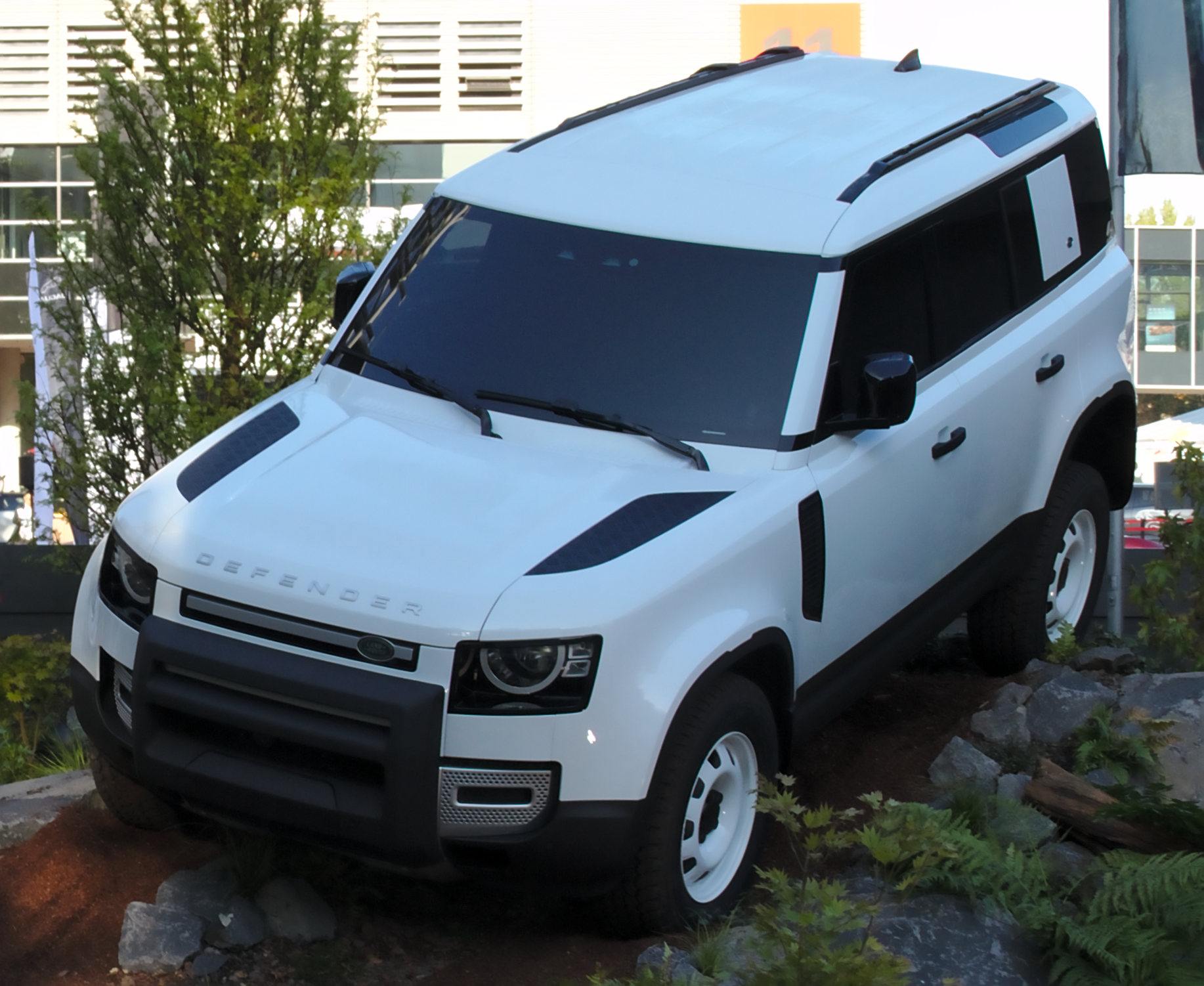
World premiere of the new Land Rover Defender

- Alpina B3 Touring
- Audi A1 Citycarver
- Audi A4 (facelift)
- Audi A5 (facelift)
- Audi A6 Allroad Quattro
- Audi RS6 Avant
- Audi RS7 Sportback
- Audi S5 (facelift)
- Audi S6
- Audi S8
- Audi Q3 Sportback
- Audi Q7 (facelift)
- Audi SQ8 TDI
- Audi e-tron FE06 Racecar
- BMW 1 Series
- BMW 3 Series Touring
- BMW 8 Series Gran Coupé
- BMW M8 Competition Coupé
- BMW X1
- BMW X5 Protection VR6
- BMW X6
- BMW i8 Ultimate Sophisto Edition
- Brabus Mercedes-AMG A35
- Brabus G V12 900
- Brabus Ultimate E
- Byton M-Byte
- Ford Explorer Plug-in Hybrid
- Ford Kuga Plug-in Hybrid
- Ford Puma
- Honda e
- Hyundai i10
- Hyundai i30 N Project C
- Hyundai Veloster N ETCR
- Lamborghini Sián
- Land Rover Defender
- Mercedes-AMG A45 S 4MATIC+
- Mercedes-AMG CLA35 Shooting Brake
- Mercedes-AMG CLA45 S 4MATIC+
- Mercedes-AMG GLB35 4MATIC
- Mercedes-AMG GLE53 4MATIC Coupé
- Mercedes-Benz A250e
- Mercedes-Benz B250e
- Mercedes-Benz GLB
- Mercedes-Benz GLC 350e
- Mercedes-Benz GLE 350de
- Mercedes-Benz GLE Coupé
- Mercedes-Benz GLS
- Mercedes-Benz EQV
- Mini Cooper S E
- Opel Astra (facelift)
- Opel Corsa
- Opel Grandland X HYBRID4
- Porsche 718 Spyder
- Porsche 718 Cayman GT4
- Porsche 911 Carrera 4
- Porsche Cayenne Coupé
- Porsche Macan Turbo (facelift)
- Porsche Taycan
- Porsche 99X Electric Formula E Racecar
- Ramsmobile Protos RM-X2D Devil's Touch
- Renault Captur
- SEAT Tarraco FR PHEV
- Škoda Citigo iV
- Škoda Kodiaq vRS
- Škoda Kamiq Monte Carlo
- Škoda Scala Monte Carlo
- Škoda Superb (facelift)
- Škoda Superb iV
- Smart EQ ForTwo
- Smart EQ ForFour
- Trasco-Bremen XC90 Protection VR8 by Volvo
- Volkswagen e-Up!
- Volkswagen ID.3
- Volkswagen T-Roc Cabriolet

==== 2019 concept cars ====
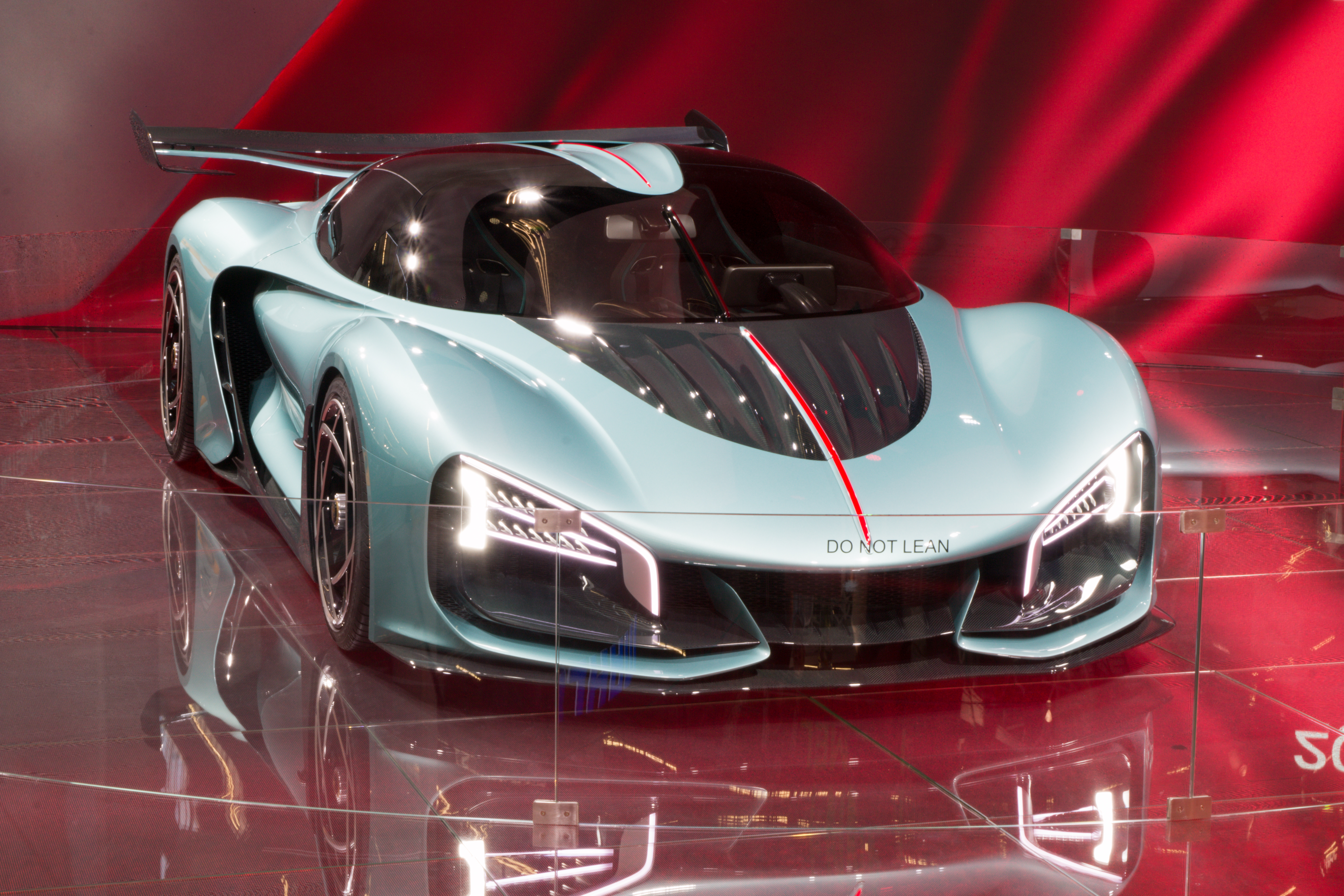
Hongqi S9

- Audi AI:CON Concept
- Audi AI:ME Concept
- Audi AI:RACE Concept
- Audi AI:TRAIL Quattro Concept
- BMW Concept 4
- BMW X5 i Hydrogen NEXT
- BMW Vision M Next Concept
- Cupra Tavascan Concept
- FAW Hongqi S9
- FAW Hongqi E115
- Hyundai 45 EV Concept
- Hyundai H-Space
- Mercedes-Benz Experimental Safety Vehicle (ESF) 2019
- Mercedes-Benz Vision EQS
- Mercedes-Benz Vision EQ Silver Arrow Concept
- Opel Corsa-e Rally

=== 2021 ===
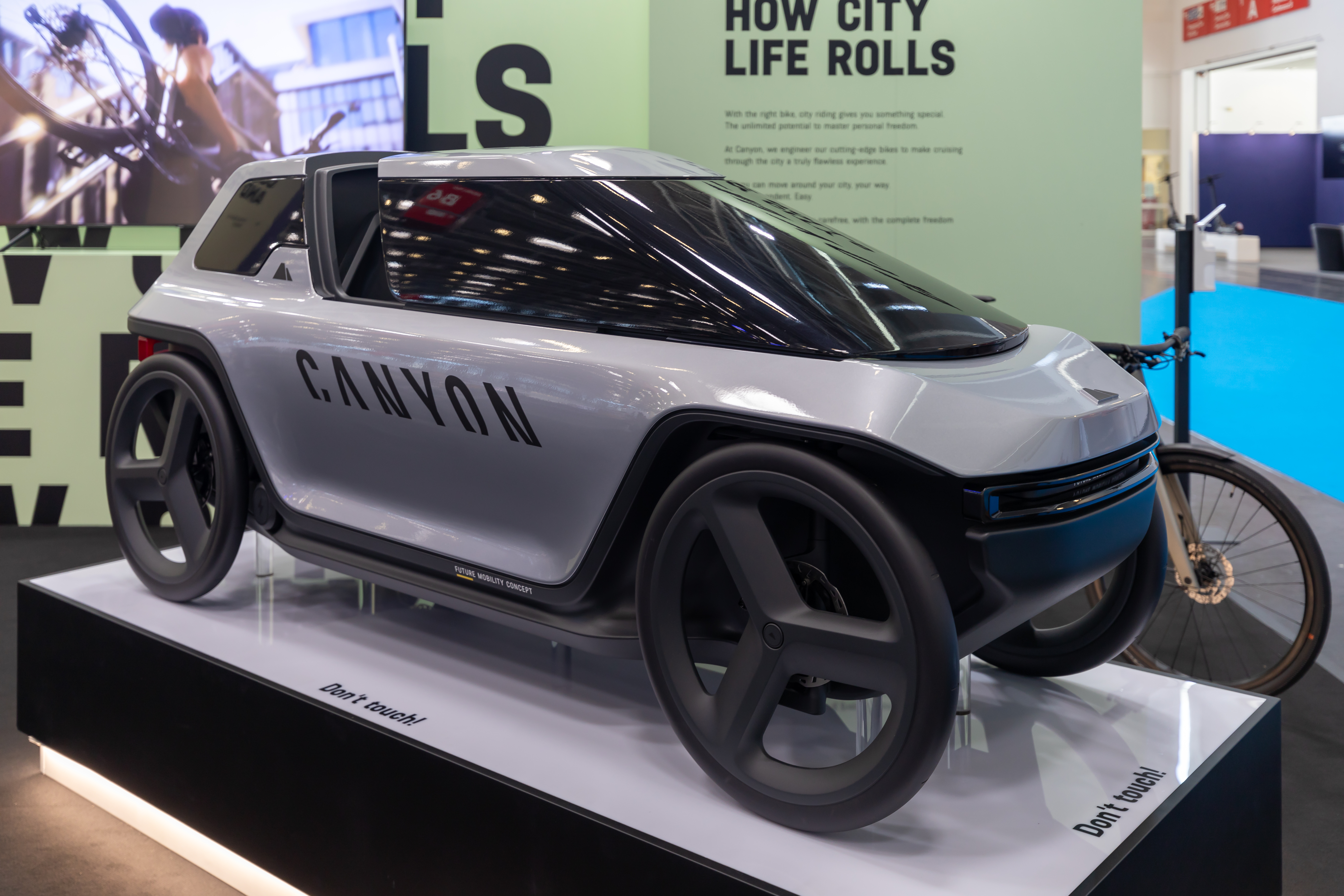
Canyon Future Mobility Concept at IAA 2021

The 2021 show took place from 7 to 12 September, with a press day on the 6th. Exhibitions are divided over seven locations around central Munich.

==== Production cars ====
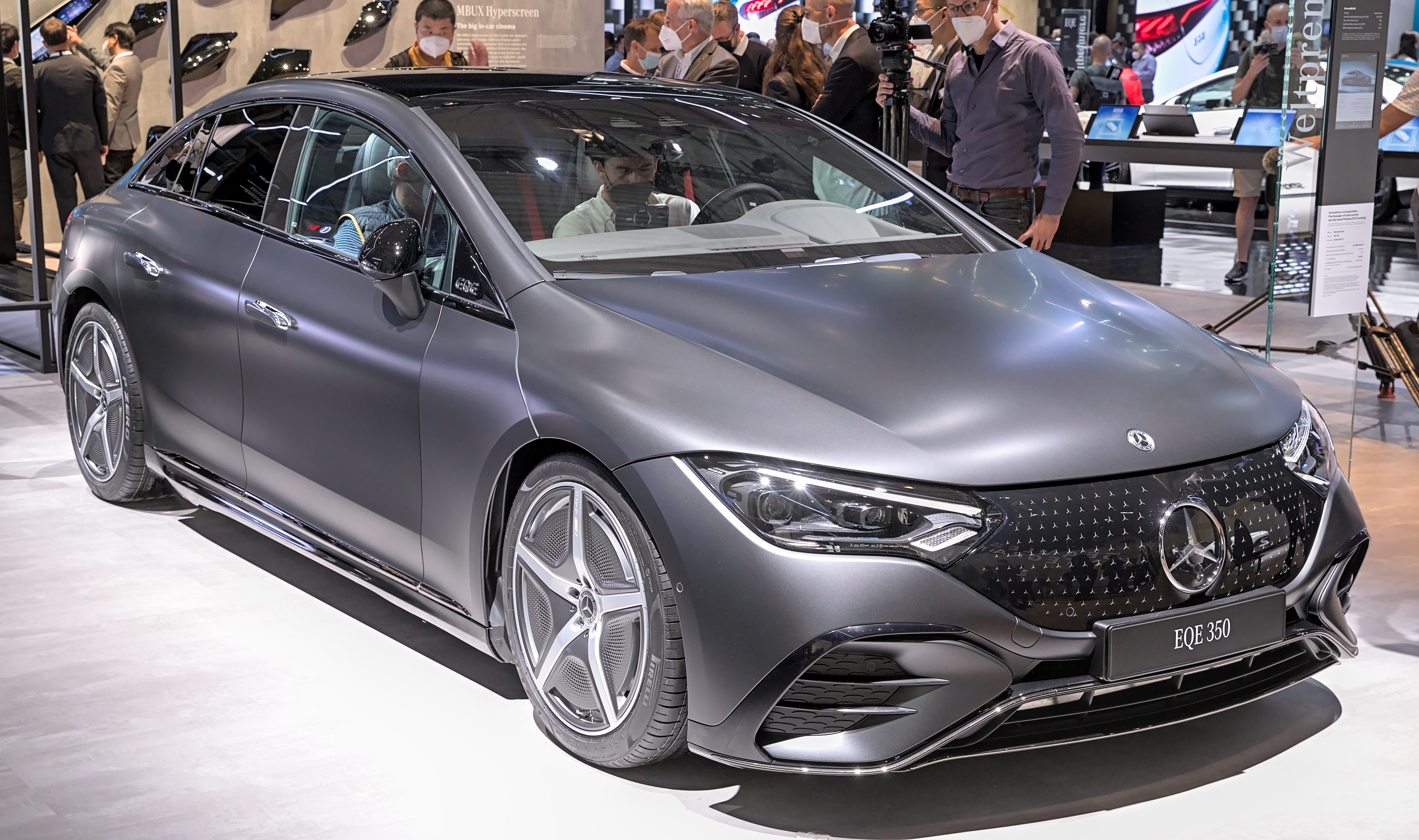
Mercedes-Benz EQE

- ACM City One
- Audi RS3
- BMW 2-Series Coupé
- BMW M240i
- BMW 4 Series Gran Coupé
- BMW i4
- BMW X3 (facelift)
- BMW X4 (facelift)
- BMW iX3 (facelift)
- Cupra Born
- Dacia Jogger
- Dacia Duster (facelift)
- GWM Ora Cat
- GWM Wey Coffee 01
- Hyundai Ioniq 5 Robotaxi
- Kia Sportage
- Mercedes-AMG GT 4-Door Coupé 63 S E Performance
- Mercedes-AMG EQS 53
- Mercedes-Benz C-Class All-Terrain
- Mercedes-Benz EQE
- Microlino
- Porsche 911 Carrera GTS
- Porsche 911 GT3 Touring Package
- Porsche Taycan Cross Turismo
- Renault Mégane E-Tech
- Volkswagen ID.5 Coupe
- Volkswagen Multivan

==== 2021 concept cars ====
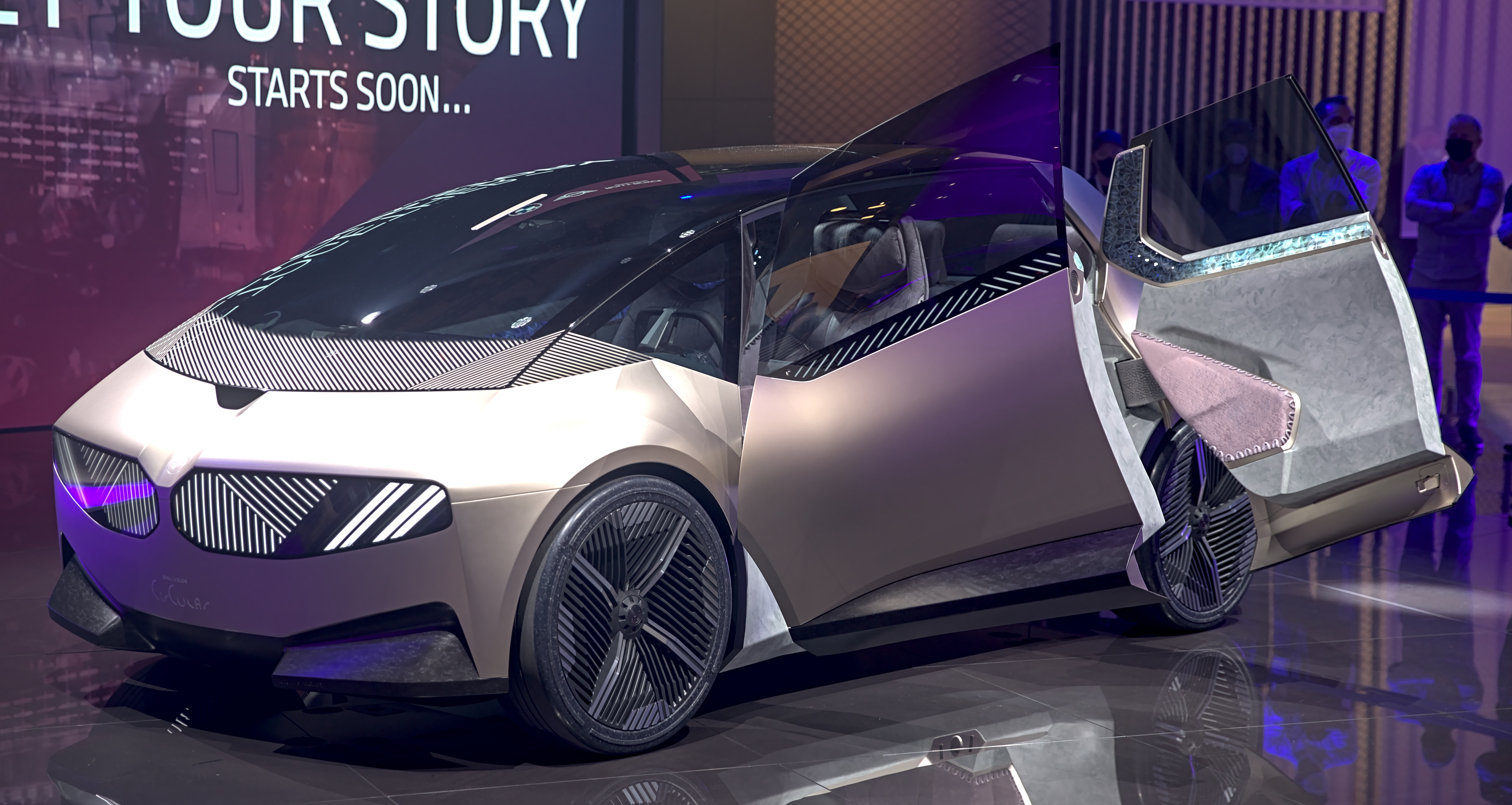
BMW i Vision Circular

- Audi Grand Sphere
- Audi Skysphere
- Audi Urban Sphere
- BMW i Hydrogen Next
- BMW I Vision Circular
- Cupra UrbanRebel
- Mercedes-Benz EQG
- Mercedes-Benz EQT
- Mercedes-Maybach EQS
- Porsche Mission R
- Renault 5 E-Tech
- Smart #1
- Volkswagen ID. Life

=== 2022 ===
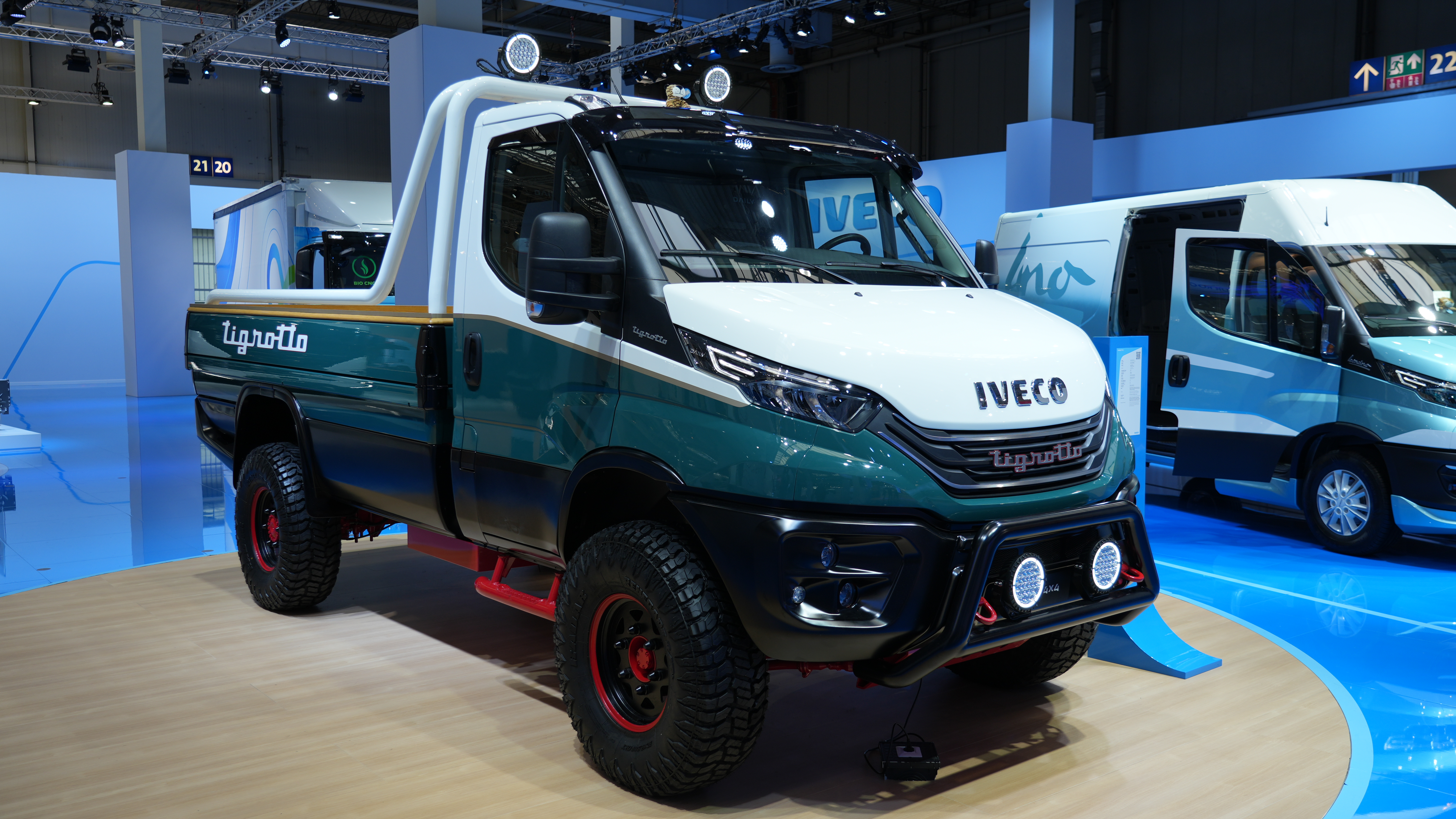
Iveco Daily 4x4 Tigrotto

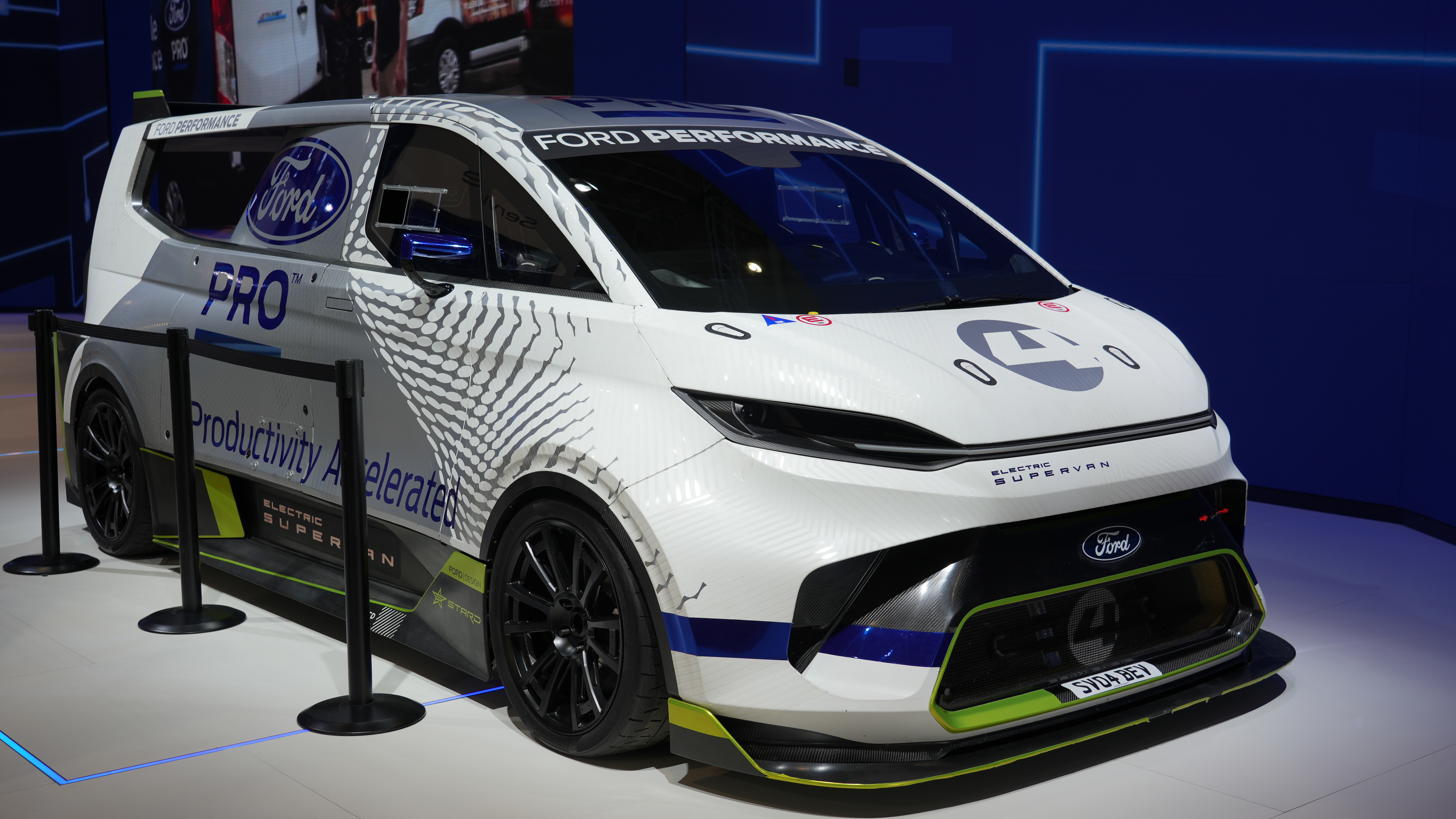
Ford Pro Electric SuperVan

The 2022 show took place in Hanover from 20 to 25 September.

==== Production vans and trucks ====
- Ford E-Transit Custom
- Iveco eDaily
- MAN eTGE
- MAN eTruck
- Maxus T90EV
- Maxus Mifa 9
- Renault Trafic E-Tech
- Volkswagen Amarok

==== Concept vans and trucks ====
- Ford Pro Electric SuperVan
- Iveco Daily 4x4 Tigrotto
- Renault Hippie Caviar Motel

=== 2023 ===
The 2023 show took place in Munich from 5 to 10 September.

==== Production cars ====
- Opel Astra Sports Tourer Electric
- Opel Corsa Electric

=== 2024 ===
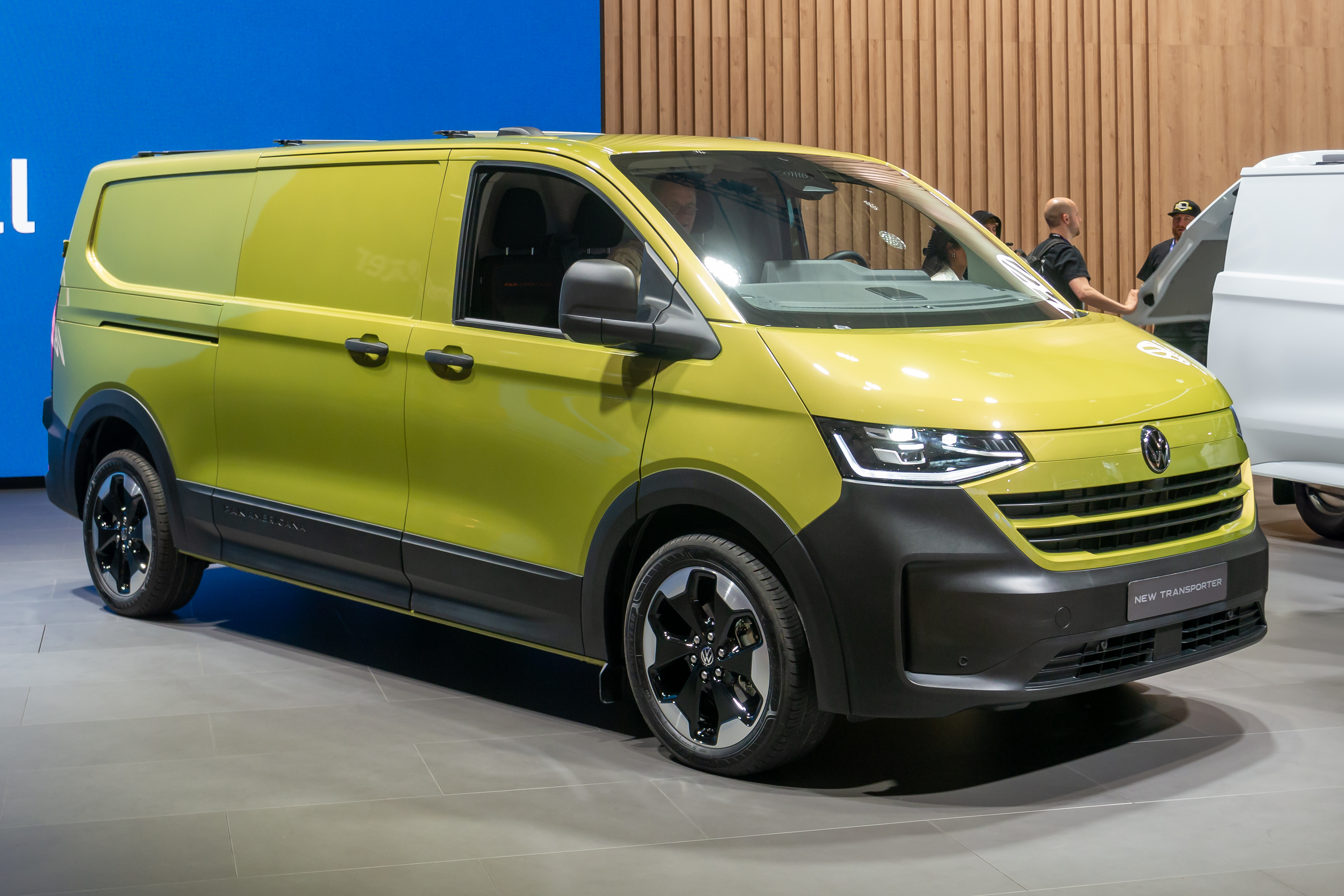
VW Transporter

The 2024 show took place in Hanover from 17 to 22 September.

==== Production vans and trucks ====
- BYD E-Vali
- Iveco eMoovy
- Maxus eTerron 9
- Volkswagen Transporter (T7)

==== Concept vans and trucks ====
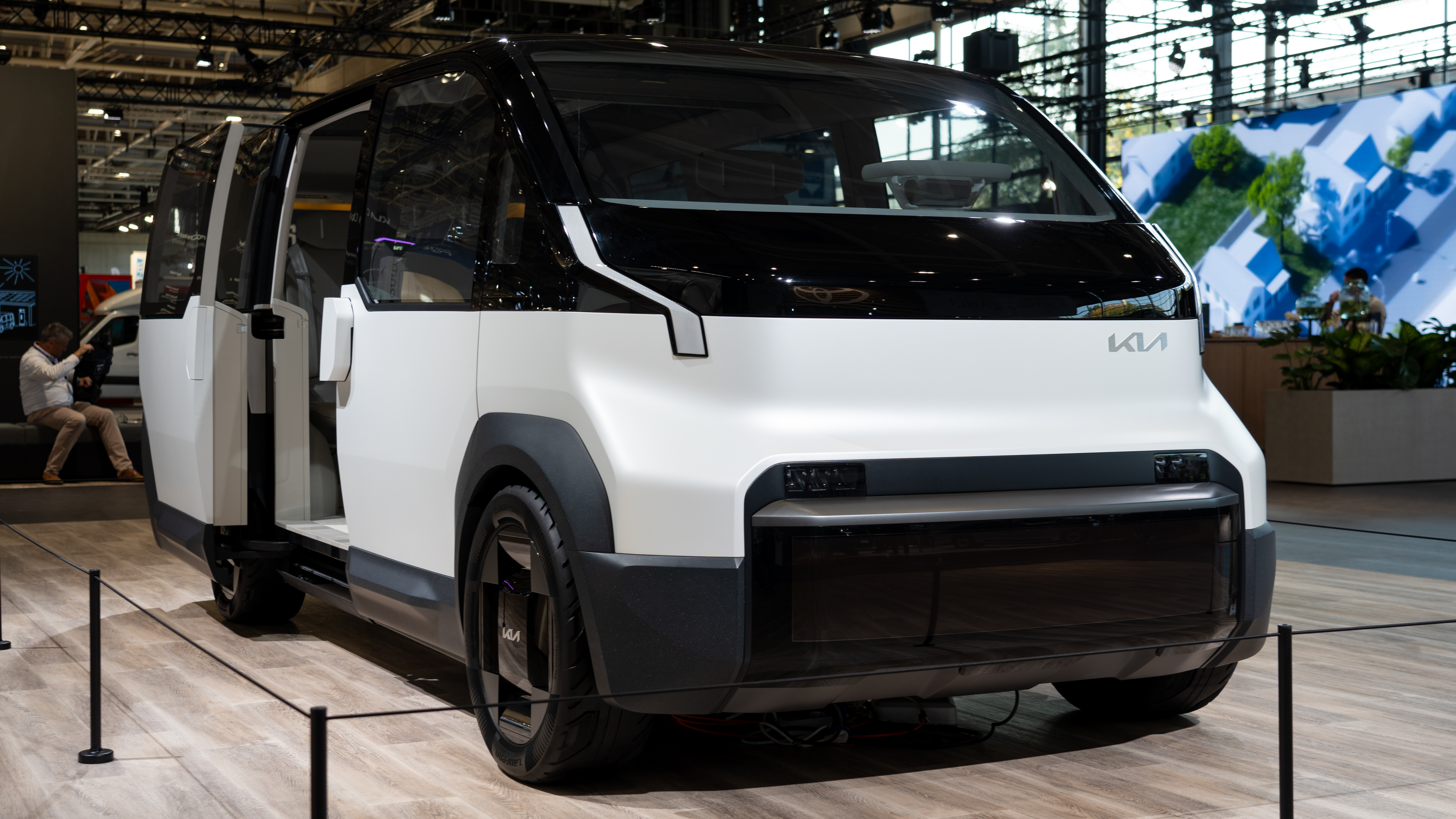
Kia PV5 Concept

- Kia PV5 Concept

=== 2025 ===
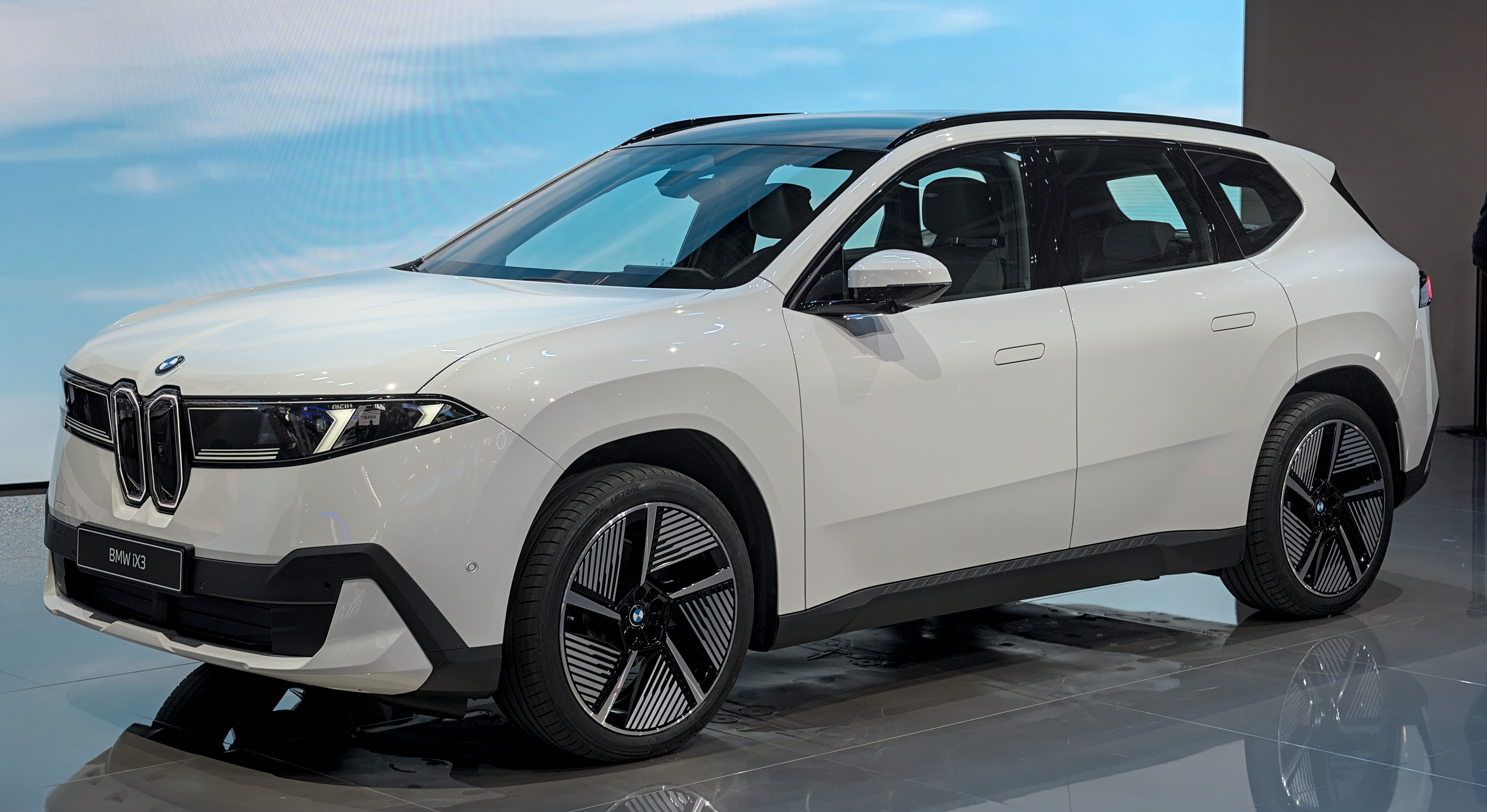
BMW iX3

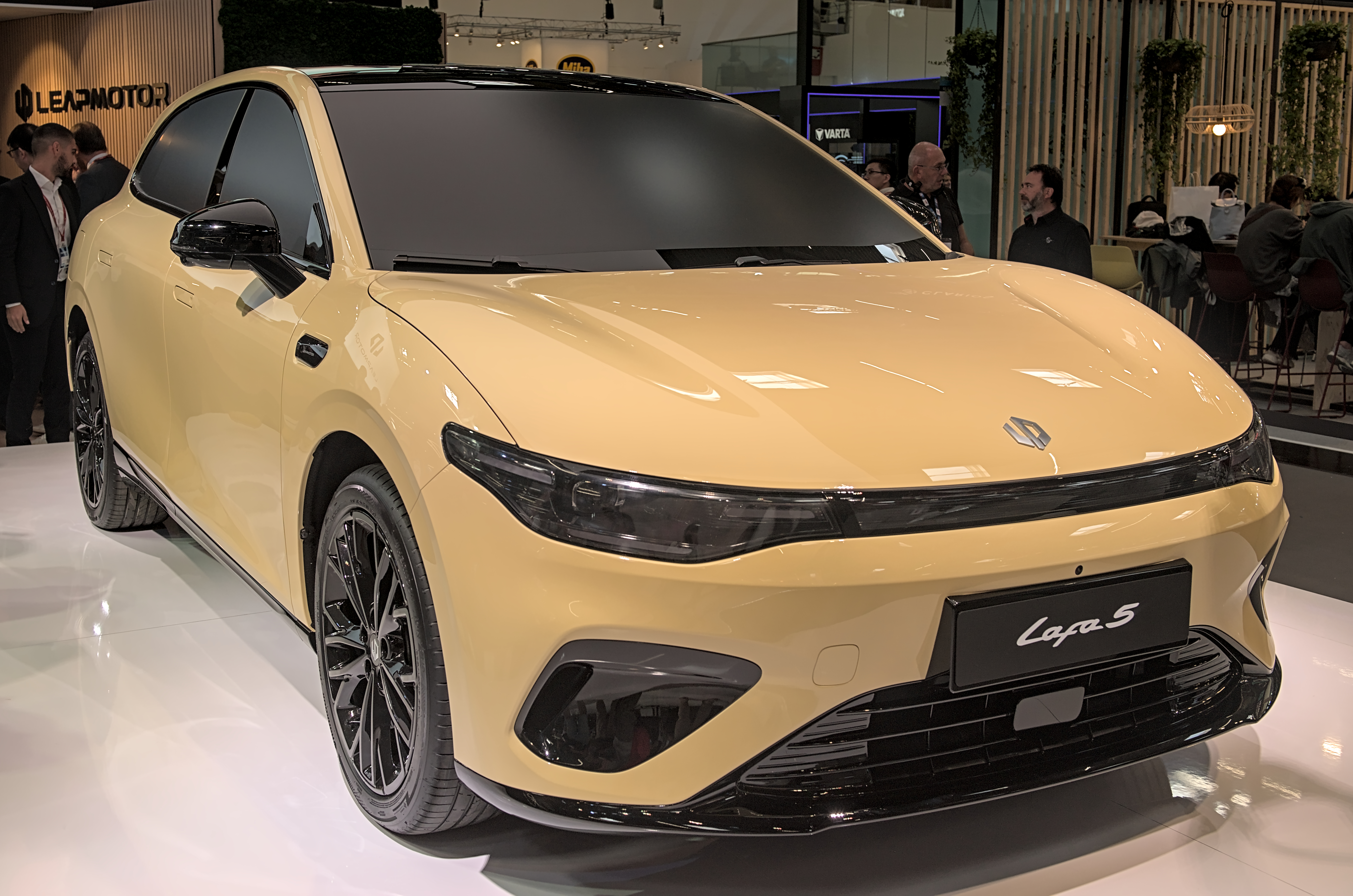
Leapmotor Lafa 5

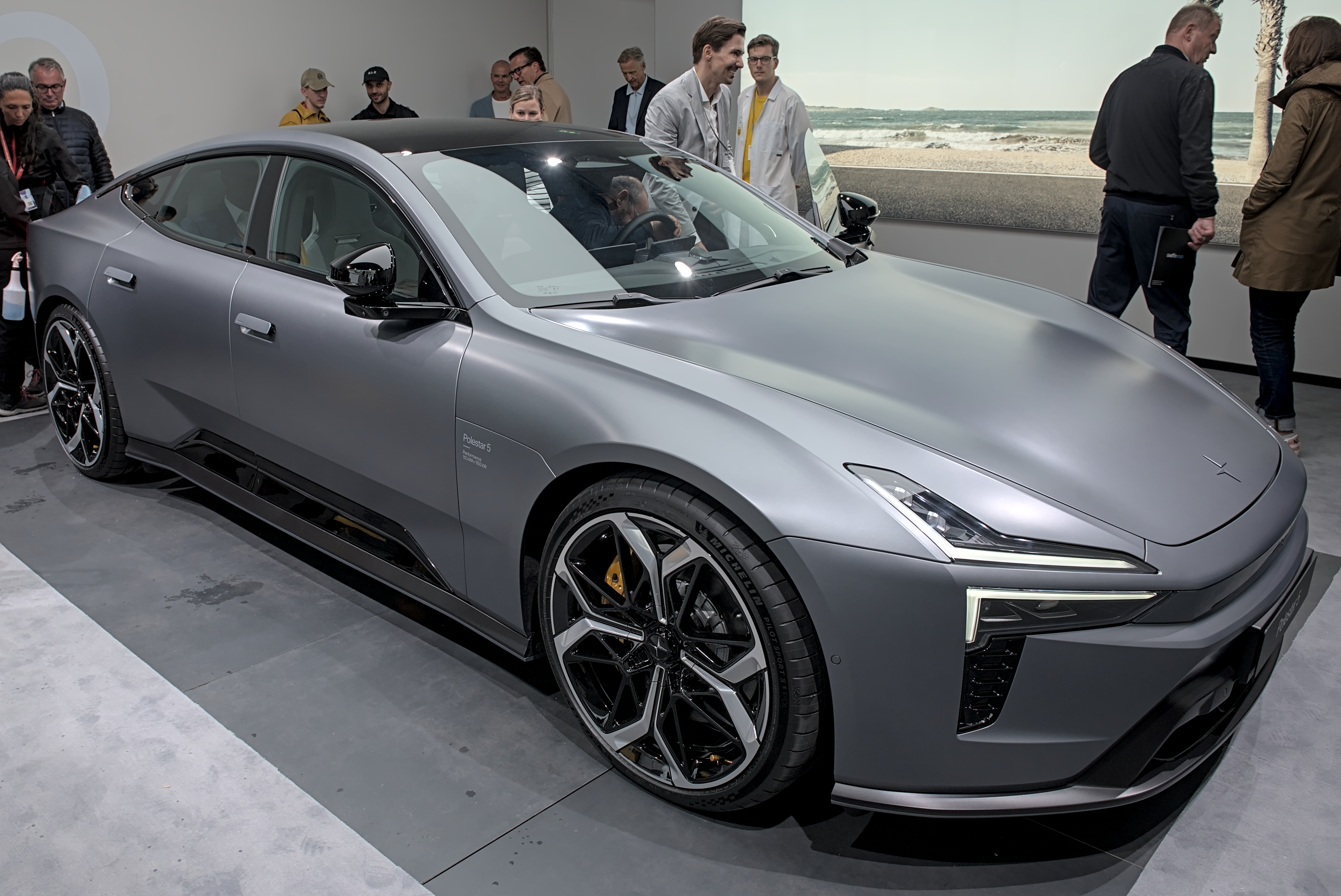
Polestar 5

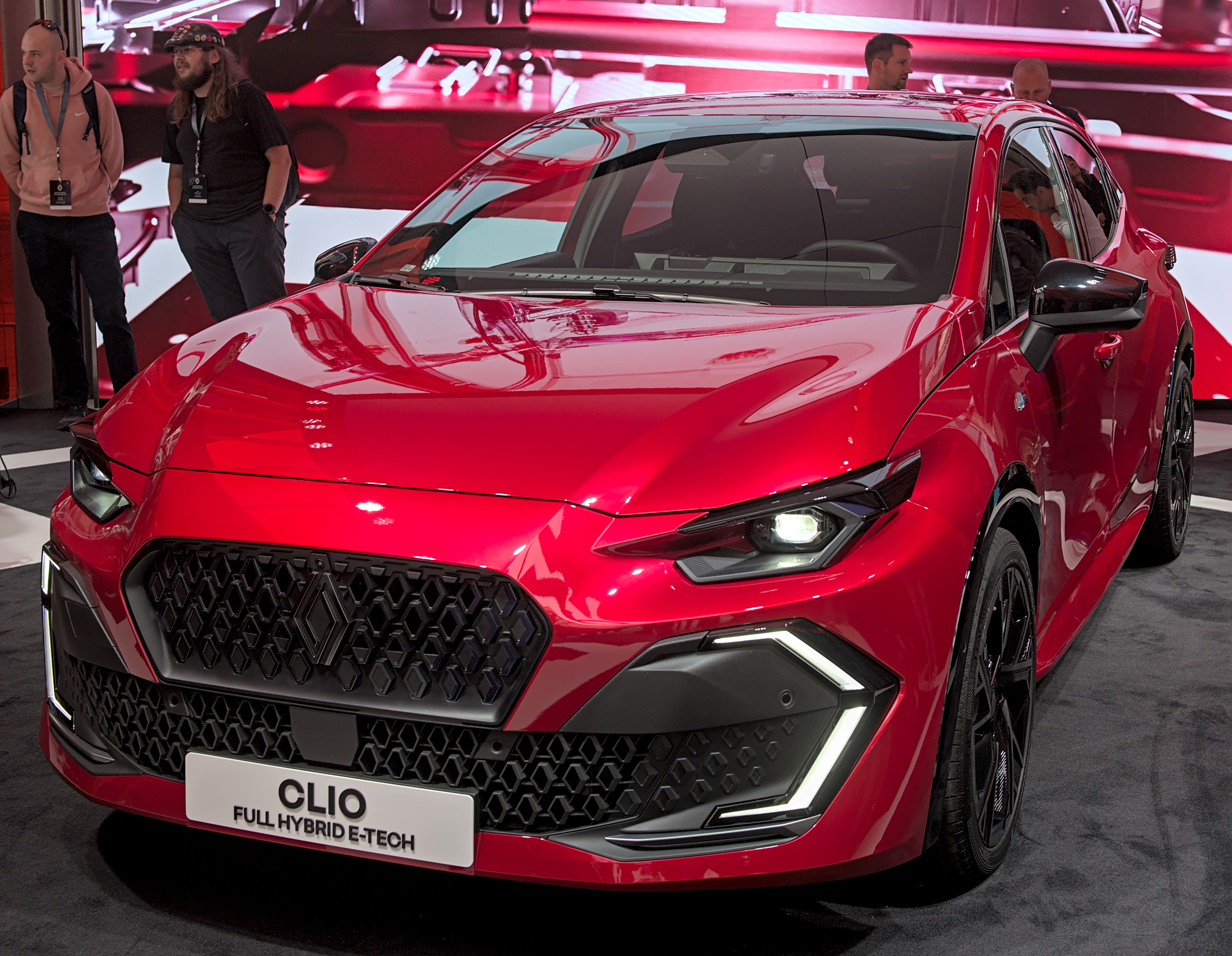
Renault Clio VI

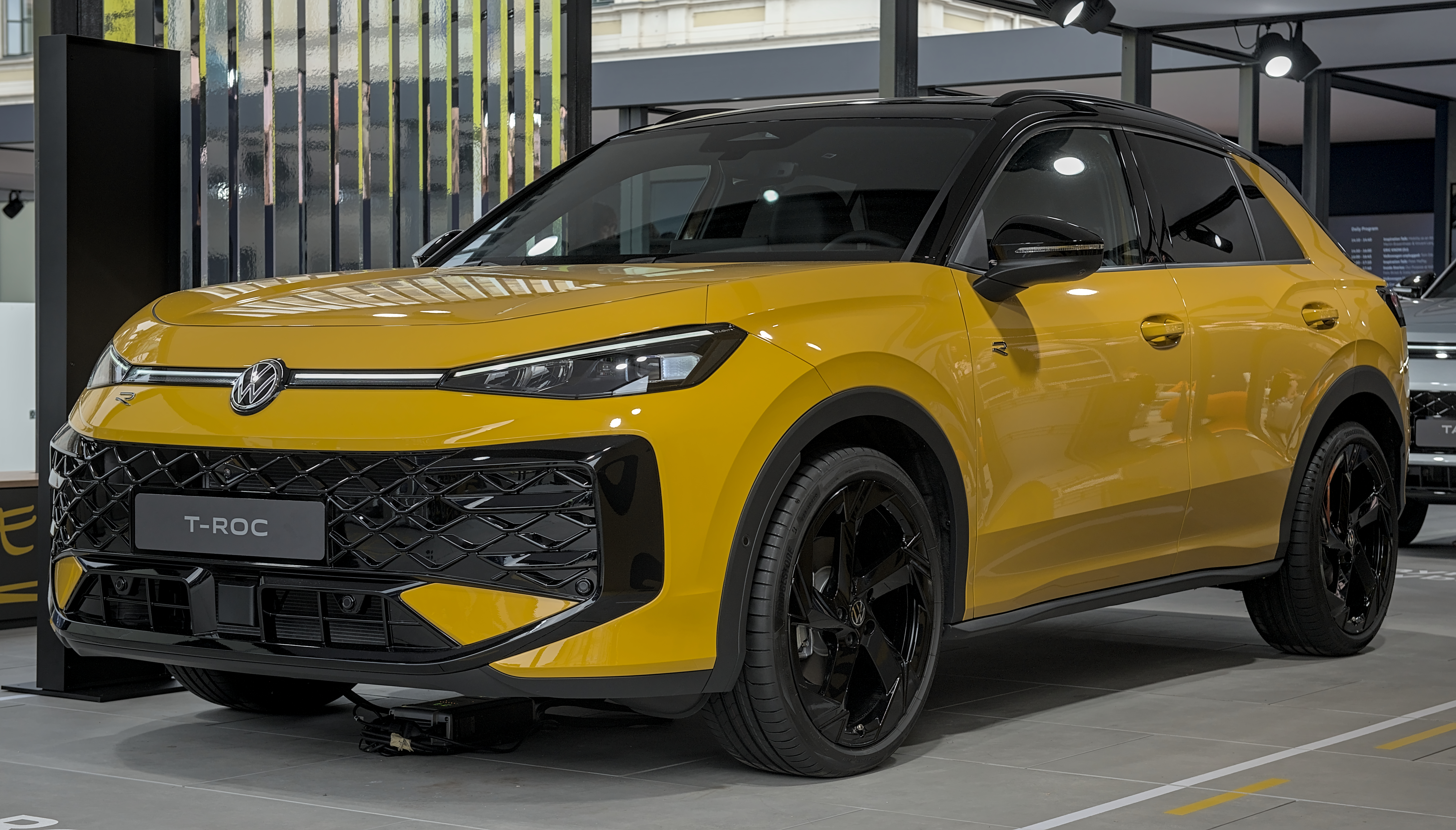
VW T-Roc Mk2

The 2025 show took place in Munich from 9 to 14 September.

==== Production cars ====
- 212 T01
- Aion UT
- Audi Q3 Sportback MK2
- Avatr 06
- Avatr 07
- Avatr 12
- BMW i3 (NA0) (prototype)
- BMW iX3 (NA5)
- BYD Seal 6 DM-i Touring
- Cupra Raval (prototype)
- Deepal S05
- Deepal S07
- Denza Z9 GT
- Denza D9
- GAC GS7
- Hongqi EHS5
- Jaecoo J5 EV
- Kia EV4
- Kia PV5
- Leapmotor B05/Lafa 5
- Link tour L6e
- Link tour L7e
- Mercedes-Benz GLC Electric
- Mercedes-Benz C-Class Electric (teaser)
- Mercedes-Benz G-Class Convertible (teaser)
- Mercedes-Benz 'Little G' (teaser)
- Mercedes-Benz VLE (prototype)
- Polestar 5
- Porsche 911 Turbo S (992.2)
- Porsche Cayenne Electric (prototype)
- Renault Clio VI
- Smart #2 (teaser)
- Škoda Epiq (prototype)
- Togg T10X
- Togg T10F
- Volkswagen T-Roc MK2
- Volkswagen ID. Polo (prototype)
- Volkswagen ID. Polo GTI (prototype)
- XPeng P7
- XPeng P7+
- XPeng G6
- XPeng G9
- XPeng X9

==== 2025 concept cars ====
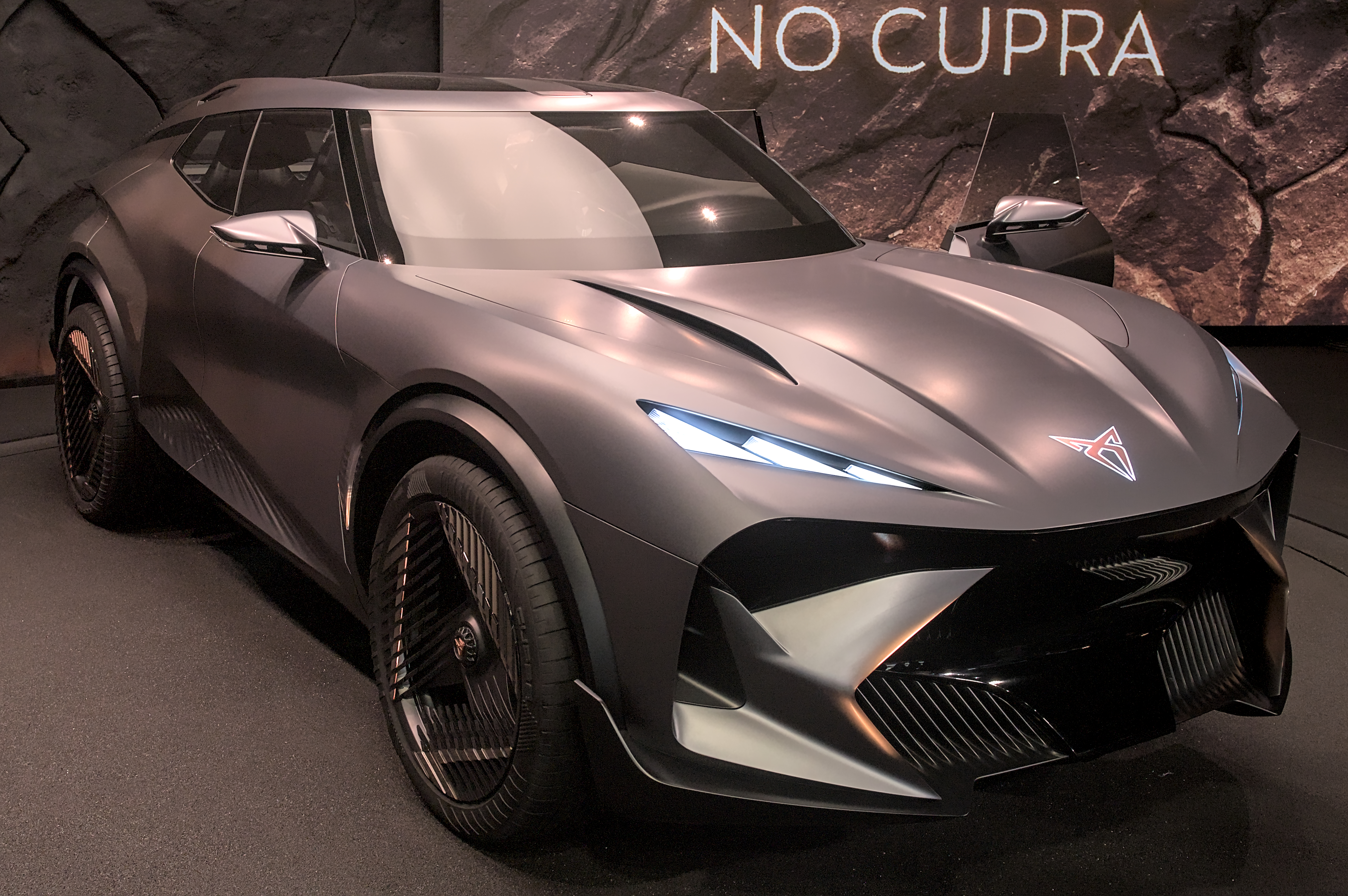
Cupra Tindaya

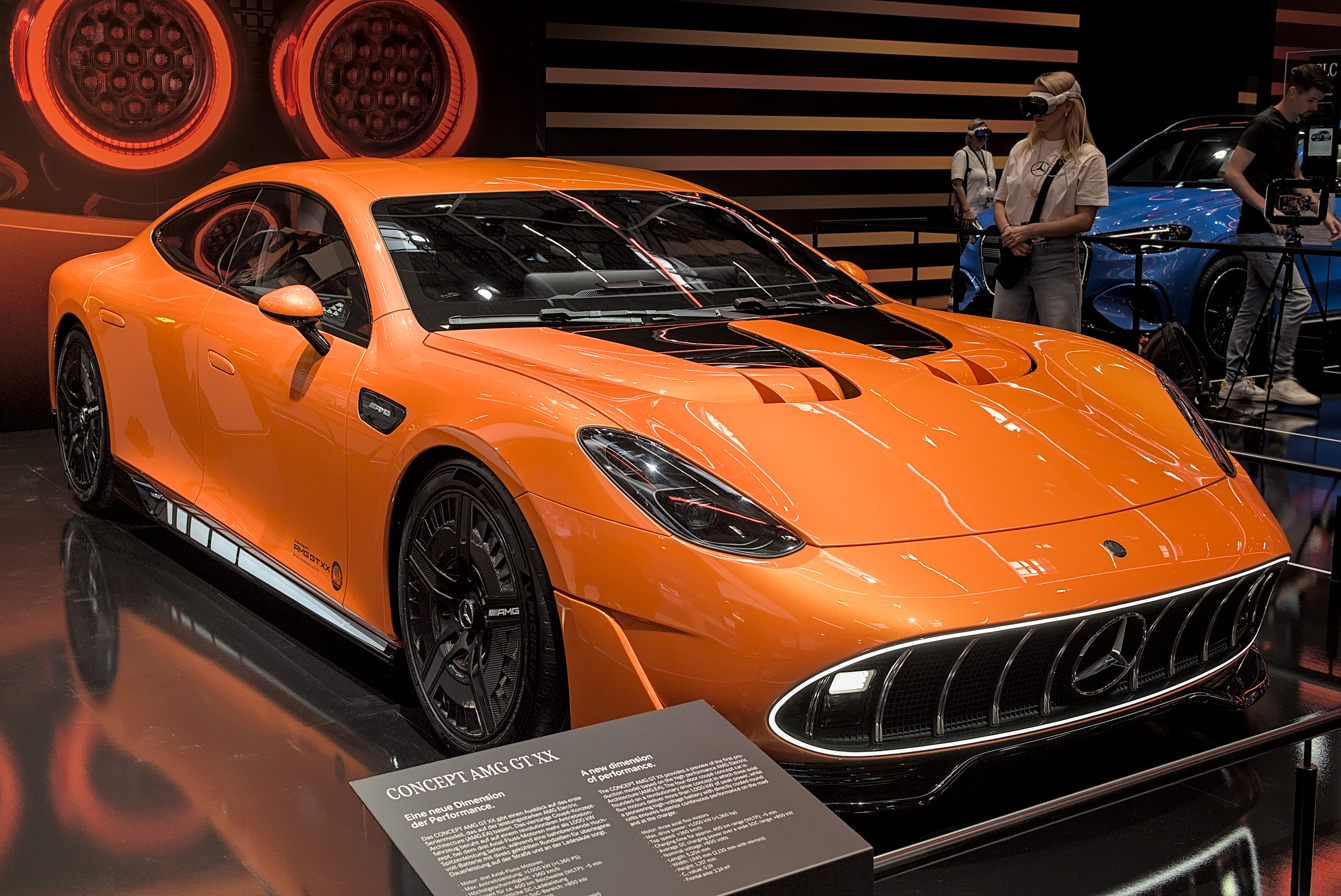
Mercedes-AMG Concept GT XX

- Audi Concept C
- Avatr Vision Xpectra
- Cupra Tindaya
- Hyundai Concept Three
- Kia EV2 Concept
- Mercedes-AMG Concept GT XX
- Mini John Cooper Works x Deus Ex Machina 'The Machina' and Electric 'The Skeg'
- Opel Corsa GSE Vision Gran Turismo
- Škoda Vision O
- Volkswagen ID. Every1
- Volkswagen ID. Cross

=== 2026 ===
The 2026 show took place in Hanover from 15 to 20 September.

==== Production vans and trucks ====
- Kia PV7

== Attendance ==
Passenger vehicles (since 2021: IAA Mobility)

Instatement	Year	Exhibitors	Visitors
22	1931	—N/a	295,000
29	1939	—N/a	825,000
35	1951	—N/a	570,000
52	1989	2,000	1,200,000
53	1991	1,271	935,000
59	2001	—N/a	800,000
60	2003	2,000	1,000,000
61	2005	—N/a	940,000
62	2007	1,081	1,000,000
64	2011	1,012	928,100
65	2013	1,098	900,000
66	2015	1,103	931,700
67	2017	994	810,400
68	2019	873	560,000
69	2021	744	400,000

Commercial vehicles (since 2022: IAA Transportation)

Instatement	Year	Exhibitors	Visitors
53	1992	1,284	287,000
58	2000	1,318	—N/a
59	2002	—N/a	237,000
60	2004	1,370	250,000
61	2006	1,556	265,500
62	2008	2,084	300,000
63	2010	1,751	250,000
64	2012	1,904	262,300
65	2014	2,066	250,000
66	2016	2,013	250,000
67	2018	2,174	250,000
68	2020	cancelled	cancelled
69	2022	1.402	TBA
70	2024	TBA	TBA

== See also ==
- Agritechnica, world's largest trade fair for agricultural technology
