= Glas 1004 =

Glas 1004 / 1204 / 1304
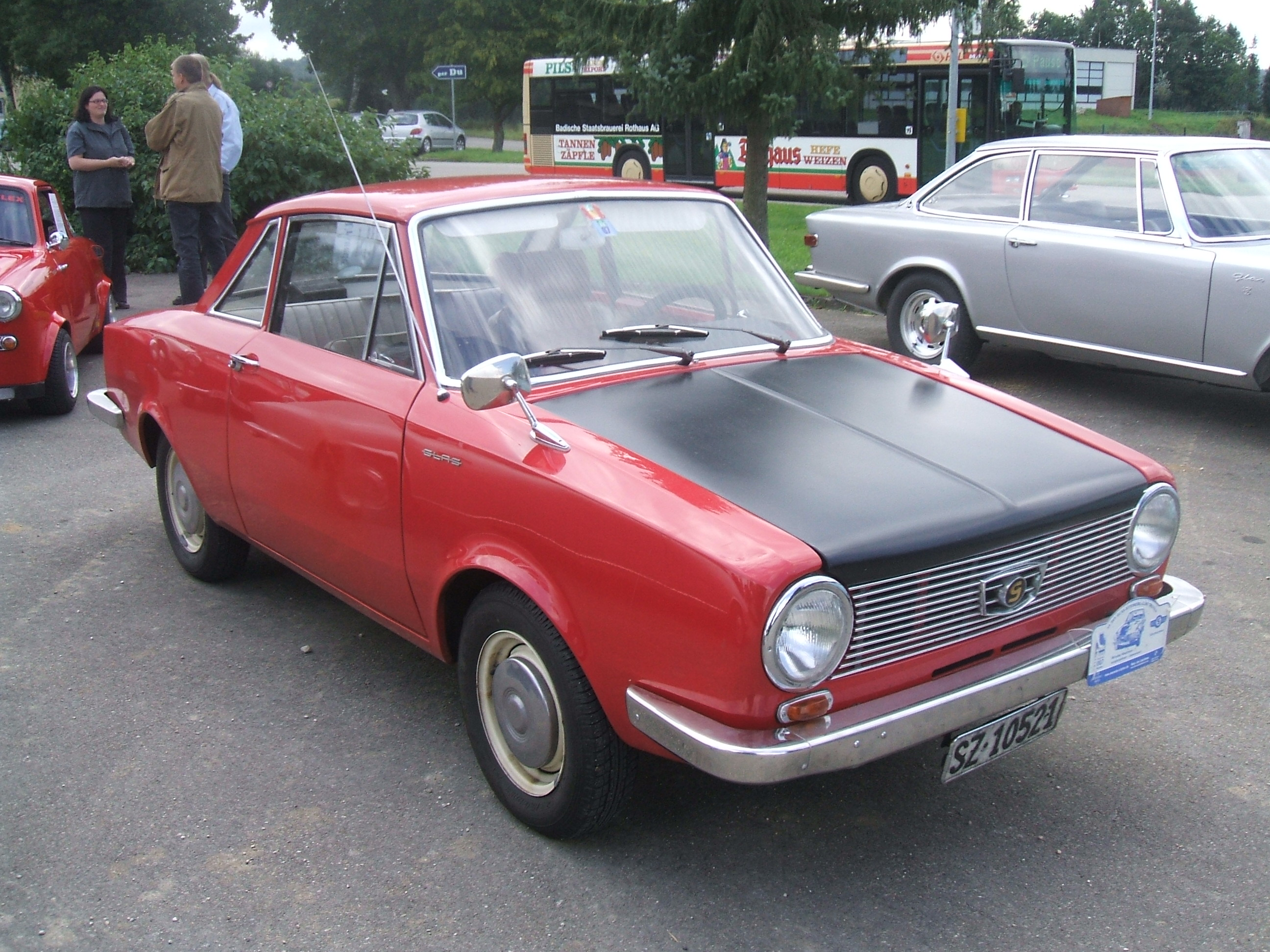
- Glas S1004 coupé

Overview
- Manufacturer: Hans Glas GmbH
- Also called: Glas Typ 612 (works number)
- Production: May 1962 – October 1965 (coupé); January 1963 – December 1967 (saloon); January 1963 – July 1967 (cabriolet); September 1966–1967/1968 (estate); 40,703 units
- Assembly: West Germany: Dingolfing

Body and chassis
- Body style: coupé, saloon, cabriolet, kombilimousine (estate)
- Layout: FR layout

Powertrain
- Engine: 4-cylinder in-line 1004: 992 cc 1204: 1189 cc 1304: 1290 cc
- Transmission: 4-speed manual all-synchromesh

Dimensions
- Wheelbase: 2,100 mm (83 in)
- Length: 3,835 mm (151.0 in)
- Width: 1,500 mm (59 in)
- Height: saloon & estate: 1,370 mm (54 in) coupe & cabriolet: 1,355 mm (53.3 in)

Chronology
- Predecessor: none
- Successor: BMW 02 Series

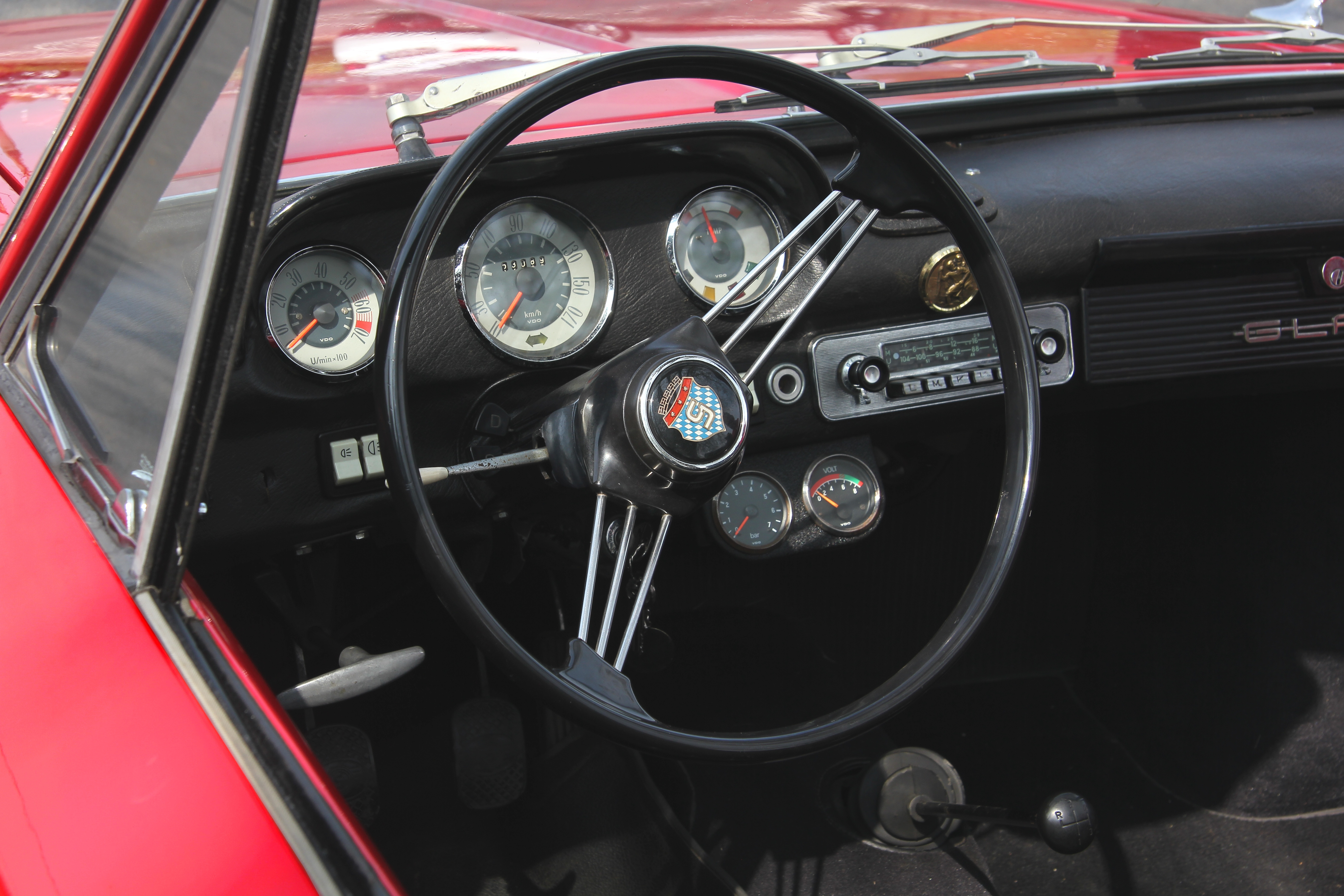
Steering wheel and dashboard of Glas 1204

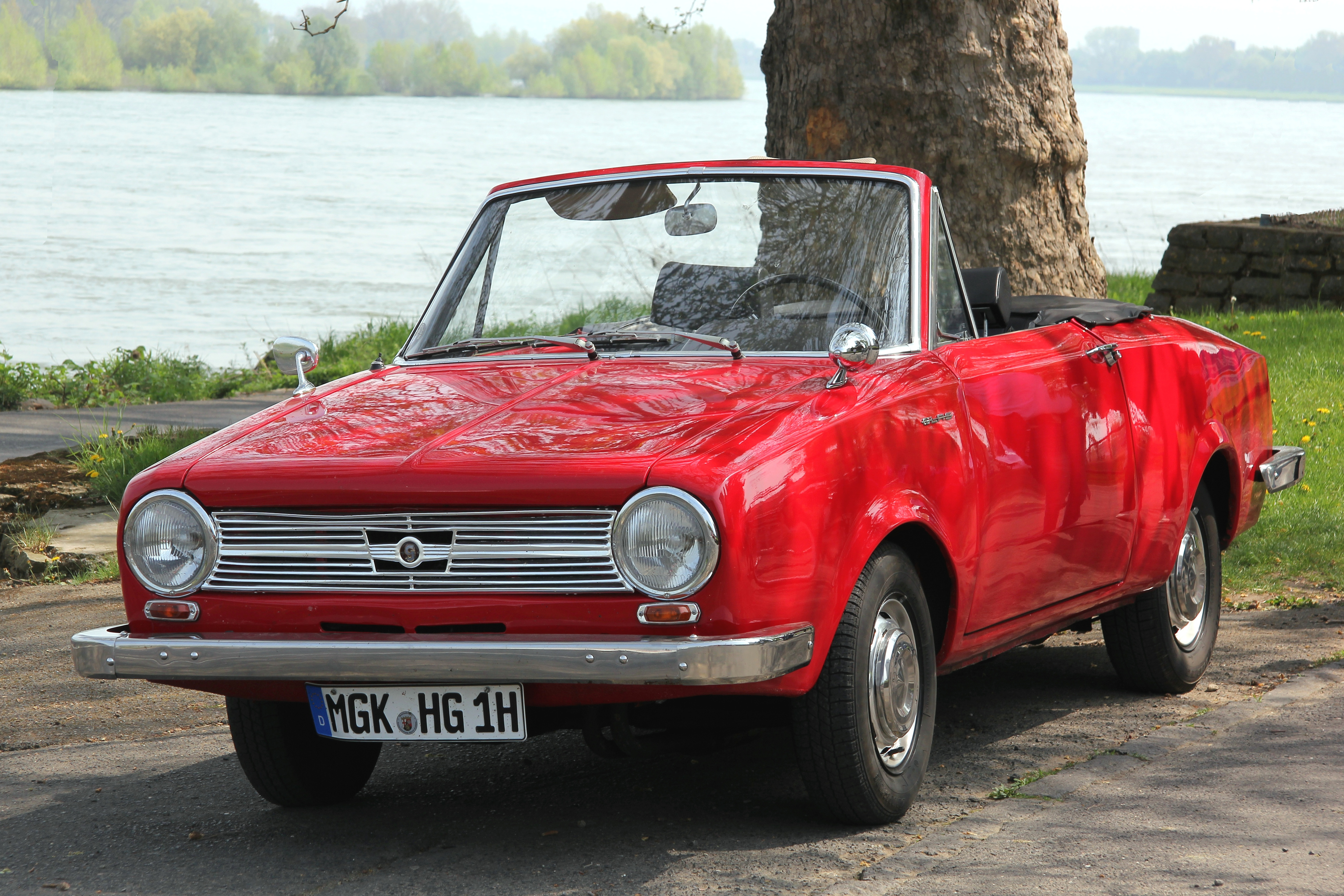
Glas 1204 Cabrio

The Glas 1004 is a small two-door, four-seater automobile produced by Hans Glas GmbH at Dingolfing, Germany. It was first exhibited in public, in coupé form, at the Frankfurt Motor Show in September 1961. Volume production of the 1004 coupé started in May 1962, and in January 1963 saloon/sedan and cabriolet versions joined the range along with the more powerful Glas 1204. September 1965 saw a yet more powerful variant, the Glas 1304. In September 1966, a fastback Kombilimousine (estate) was added. The 04s were produced at least until December 1967, and new cars were listed for sale through much of 1968.

== Origins ==
In 1960 the company's research workshop came up with an engine that used an unconventional camshaft drive. Product developer Leonhard Ischinger, who had joined Glas from BMW, had produced a four-cylinder OHC engine with valve gear driven using a toothed rubber cam-belt, which at that time was a novel idea. The 992 cc engine provided a maximum output of 42 PS (31 kW) at 5,000 rpm. In 1961, the company added a modern coupé body using the chassis of the Glas Isar which for this application had been lengthened by 10 cm. The result was the 1004 prototype which appeared at the Frankfurt Motor Show in September of that year.

== S 1004 ==
Volume production began in May 1962 and the first cars were delivered in August. The car retained the water cooled 992 cc engine of the prototype which at this stage still delivered a claimed 42 PS (31 kW) of maximum power at 5,000 rpm. Drive was to the rear wheels via a four-speed manual transmission incorporating – still slightly unusually for this size of car – synchromesh on all four forward speeds.

The S 1004 came with a steel monocoque steel body strengthened, from the start on this model, by reinforcing box sections under the floor. Commentators noted the contrast between the car's relatively short 2,100 mm wheelbase and the overall 3,835 mm length of the car, which may, by later standards, have compromised the handling but did permit the use of a relatively short drive-shaft.

Front suspension used trailing arms and independent springs in combination, while at the back a swing axle was supported by leaf springs. Both at the front and at the back the suspension was enhanced with "rubber air-filled hollow springs".

The hydraulically controlled drum brakes operated on all four wheels while the hand brake operated via a cable linkage to the rear wheels. Steering was of the then common worm and roller type.

The 2+2 coupé was advertised at 5,595 DM, a price which increased to 5,865 DM in November 1963. From January 1963 the cabriolet was also offered, priced at a recommended 6,500. The Glas 1004 had the smallest engine in the range, and this was offered in combination with the full four-seater sedan/saloon only from September 1965. A still unusual optional extra from August 1963 was disc brakes on the front wheels, fitted for an extra 195 DM.

Press comment in a country where technical innovation generates enthusiasm was very positive in respect of the car's status as the world's first production car to be fitted with a belt driven camshaft, but criticised the unresponsiveness of the standard drum brakes and the heavy clutch. The car's tendency to pitch under acceleration or sharp braking which was attributed to its short wheel base also drew criticism as did the “back to front” gear box which, as on the existing Isar, had originally been intended for a (never produced except as a prototype) front-wheel-drive small car and accordingly positioned first and third gears nearest to the driver, with second and fourth gears nearest the front of the car.

== 1204/S 1204 ==
The full four seater arrived in January with the 1204 which had its cylinder stroke extended from 61 mm to 73 mm, to give an engine capacity of 1,189 cc and claimed maximum power of 53 PS (39 kW) at 5,100 rpm. The larger engined car was also offered as a coupé and as a cabriolet.

== 1004 TS/1204 TS ==
In November 1963 Glas added twin carburettor versions of both the 992 cc and 1,189 cc engined cars which were branded as the Glas 1004 TS and the Glas 1204 TS. Claimed maximum horsepower output on these twin carburettor powered cars were 63 PS (46 kW) at 6,000 rpm and 70 PS (51 kW) at 5,750 rpm, respectively. The faster 1204 TS now came with a reported top speed of 160 km/h which matched the 100 mph barrier in the US, and put this relatively light-weight car on terms with several Porsche and Alfa Romeo sports cars in terms of straight line performance. The 1204 TS also managed acceleration from 0 to 100 km/h (63 mph) in 11.9 seconds, although the car with this engine no longer offered small car levels of fuel economy. The TS powered versionsof the car came with front disc brakes included in the price which provided, according to a contemporary report, “good stopping power with little effort”. With the 1204 TS, in May 1964 Glas were offering for 6,980 DM a sporting and well appointed car that in many respects matched competitor vehicles priced at 10,000 DM or more.

In 1964 the Glas 1204 TS also enjoyed competition success. A 1204 TS driven by Gerhard Bodmer finished in eighth position of the 86 cars that started in the 500 km Nürburgring race, achieving a class win in the process. The Bodmer/Schmidt partnership were equally successful in the Spa-Francorchamps 24 hour race, finishing eighth overall and achieving a class win ahead of their team-mates Lambrechts and Mombaerts in another 1204 TS.

== 1304 TS ==
In September 1965 the 1,290 cc engine from the Glas GT was installed, giving rise to a new top of the range model which now offered maximum power of 85 PS (63 kW) and a top speed of 168 km/h (104 mph).

== 1304/S 1304 ==
A single carburetter version of the 1304 engine also became available in 1965, which still offered 44 kW (60 PS) of power and commensurate performance.

== 1004 ==
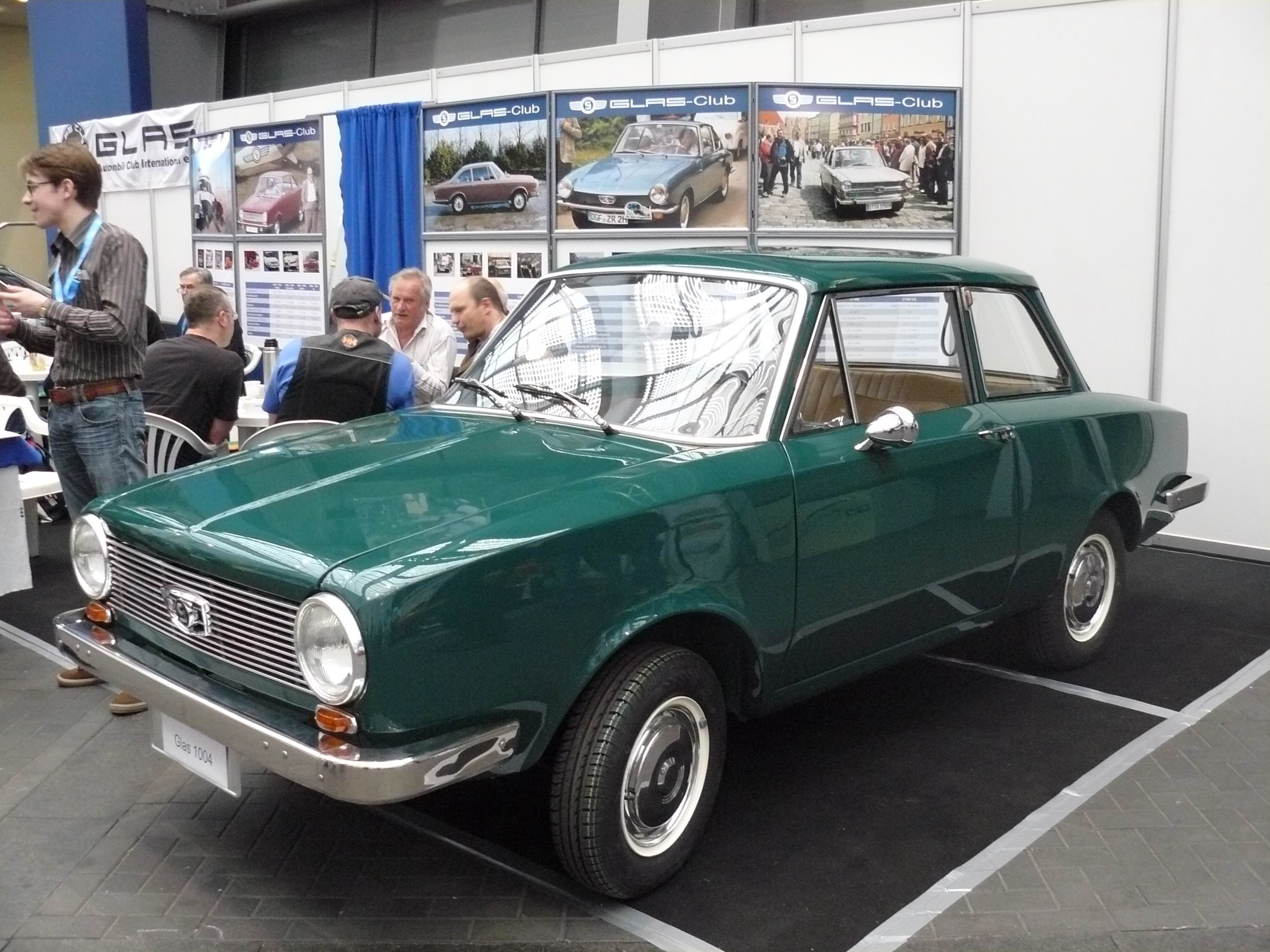
Glas 1004 sedan

Also in September, an updated entry level 1004 was introduced, horsepower on the 992 cc engine now reduced to 40 PS (29 kW). The car featured a slightly higher compression ratio than the original 1004 in 1963 and a different carburetor.

== 1004 CL/1304 CL ==
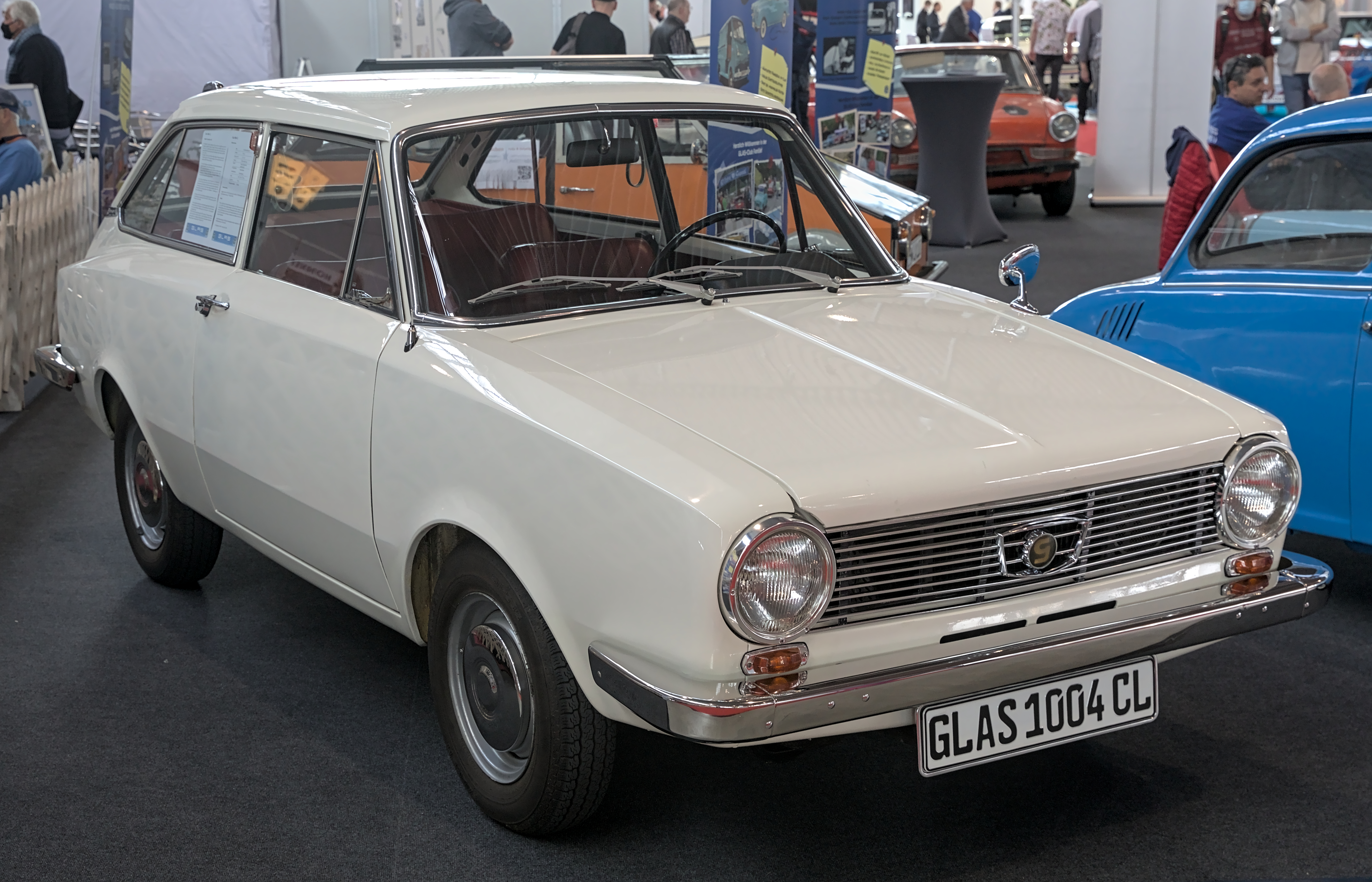
Glas 1004 CL (Kombi-limousine)

Two fastback bodied kombi-limousines (estate cars) arrived in August 1966. Estate cars of this size – at least in Germany – were still relatively uncommon. The kombi-limousines could be purchased as either 1004 CL or 1304 CL, with the "CL" standing for Combi Limousine. The Glas estate cars met with little success in the market place. Despite the rear tailgate, luggage space and rear leg room was severely limited thanks to the car's short wheelbase. With a single carburetter the 1304 has 60 PS (44 kW) at 5000 rpm; this was enough for a claimed 148 km/h (92 mph) top speed. The CL continued to be available for a little while after the BMW takeover (until April 1968). It also inspired BMW's then Sales Director Hahnemann to develop the 02-series Touring.
