= Glas V8 =

Glas V8 (1966–1967) BMW-Glas V8 (after July 1967)
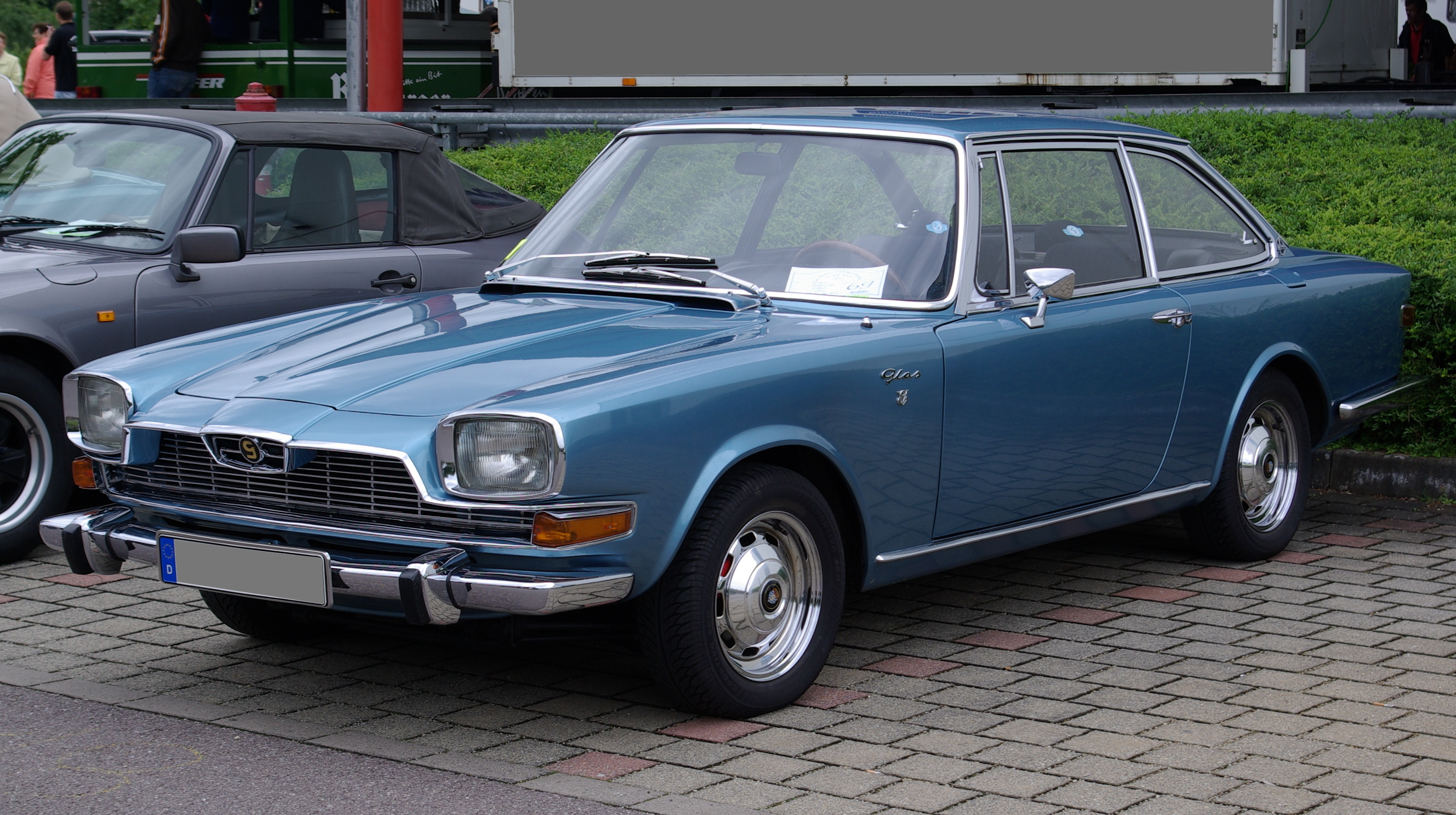

Overview
- Manufacturer: Hans Glas GmbH
- Also called: Glas 2600
- Production: July 1966 – May 1968; 666 built
- Assembly: West Germany: Dingolfing
- Designer: Pietro Frua

Body and chassis
- Body style: 2-door coupé
- Layout: FR layout

Powertrain
- Engine: 1966–1967: 2580 cc V8; 1967–1968: 2962 cc V8
- Transmission: 4-speed manual

Dimensions
- Wheelbase: 2,500 mm (98.4 in)
- Length: 4,600 mm (181.1 in)
- Width: 1,750 mm (68.9 in)
- Height: 1,380 mm (54.3 in) (loaded)

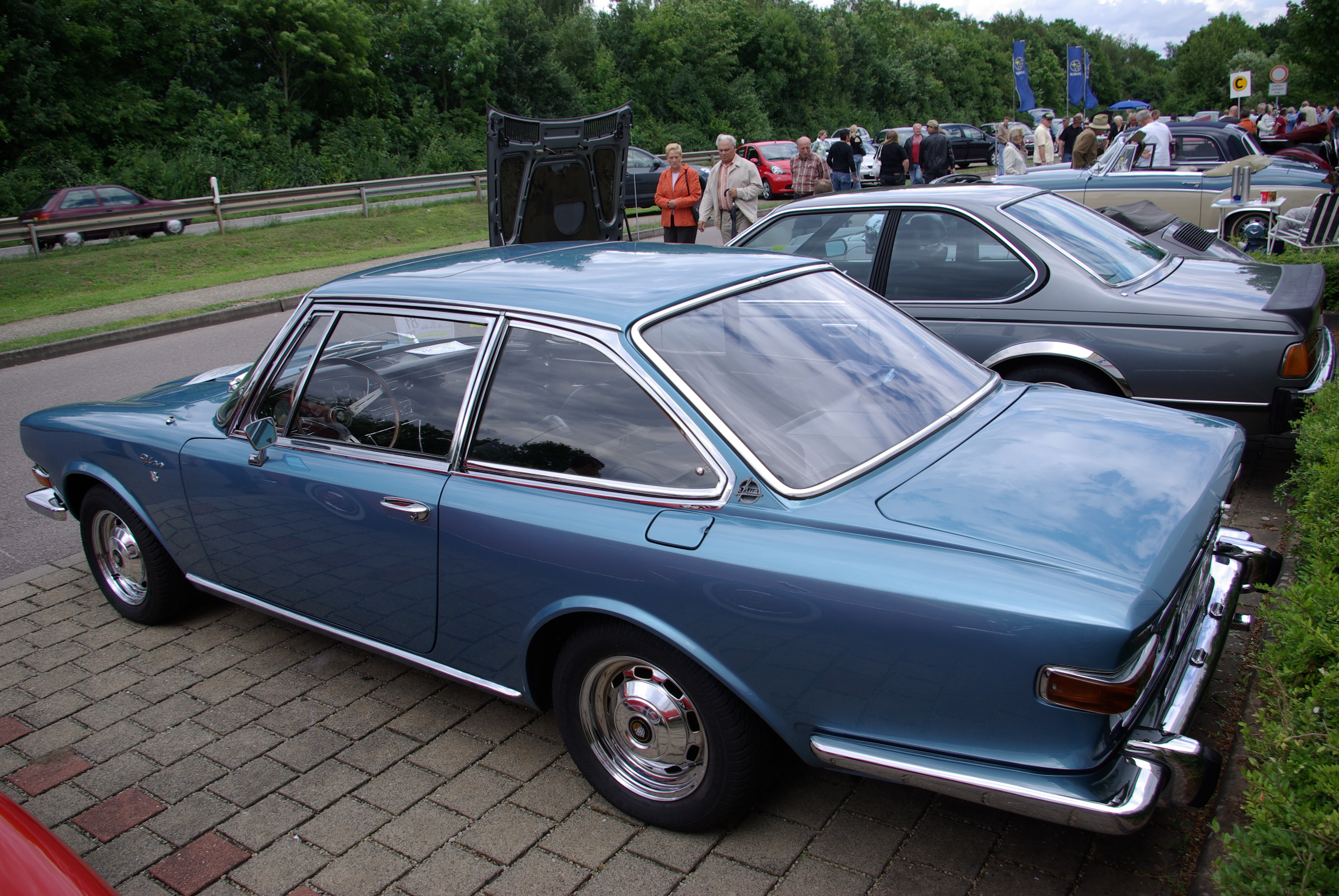
Rear

The Glas V8 is a V8-engined coupé produced by Hans Glas GmbH at Dingolfing. The car was first presented in September 1965 at the Frankfurt Motor Show, where it became nicknamed the "Glaserati" because of its Frua design, which shared many themes with contemporary Maseratis.

The V8 shared its wheelbase with the company's existing Glas 1700 sedan, resulting in long overhangs at each end which some commentators felt compromised the aesthetics of the striking design and the car's road holding.

== Development ==
The manufacturer took the decision in 1964 to build on the popularity of the existing Glas GT and produce a six-cylinder GT coupé. The intention was later to add a sports saloon to the range based on the new coupé.

However, the company's finances were already precarious and to save on development costs it was decided instead to use the manufacturer's 1290 cc four-cylinder engine as the basis for a new V8 engine, which is why the size of the new engine, at 2580 cc, was precisely twice that of the existing engine. The engine had two overhead camshafts — one for each bank of cylinders — and these were driven using two cam belts.

The contract for the car's design again went to Frua of Moncalieri, with the proviso that as far as possible they should avoid the requirement to design new components where existing parts might be obtained from other manufacturers. The resulting design, therefore, featured, among its many “borrowed” components headlights from a Setra bus, window winder mechanisms from a Mercedes-Benz 230SL and the door locks of a Porsche 911. The bodywork was built by hand, with moving parts such as the doors and bonnets as well as the chrome trim stripe at top of the grille, being made to fit each individual body. All such parts thus carry the chassis number of each car and mean that they are not directly interchangeable between cars.

The design presented at the Frankfurt Motor Show in September 1965 was seen as sensational, its similarity to the Maserati Quattroporte (another Frua design) earning the new Glas coupé the sobriquet “the Glaserati”.

== 2600 V8 ==
V8 engine at Automuseum Melle

Following a familiar pattern with Glas new model launches, it was nearly a year later, in July 1966, that new V8s started to emerge from the Glas plant at Dingolfing. The 2580 cc engine produced a claimed maximum power output of 110 kW (150 PS; 148 hp), which was sufficient to take the full four-seater up to a maximum speed of 198 km/h (123 mph) where conditions on the country's rapidly growing Autobahn highway network allowed. Thanks to the hydraulic struts developed by Boge, this was the first production car in Germany to feature self-levelling suspension. Failure to match the targeted 200 km/h (126 mph) maximum speed were attributed to "problems" involving the carburetors.

== BMW-Glas 3000 V8 ==
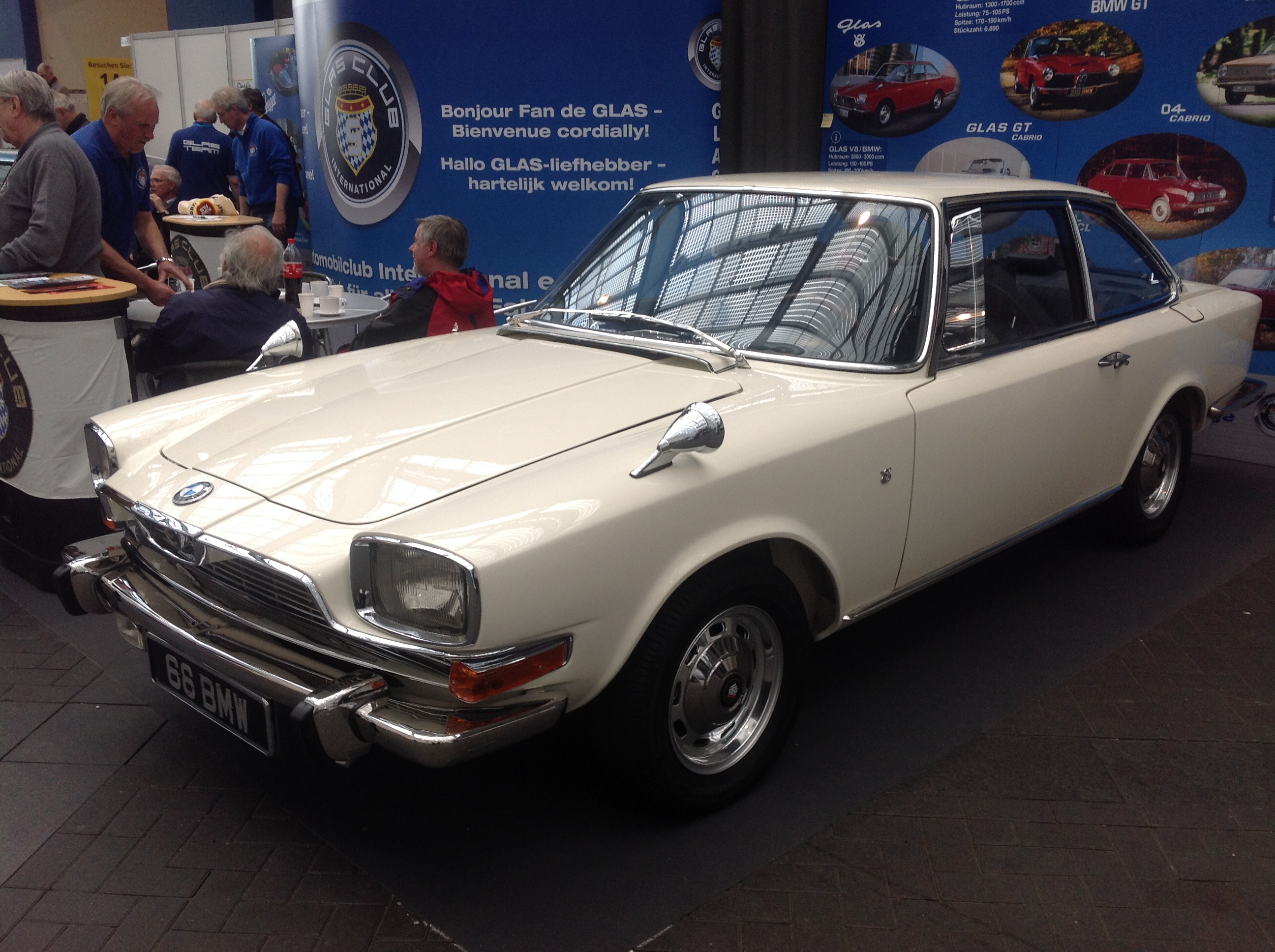
A BMW-Glas 3000 V8

By February 1966 Glas were running a prototype V8 with the engine bored out to 2982 cc (literally a doubled up version of the 1489 cc unit found in some versions of the company's Glas GT) and a three way carburetor. This version offered maximum power output of 118 kW (160 PS) and according to some sources now managed to top the 200 km/h (126 mph) maximum specified in the original brief for the car. In a 1967 test by Auto Motor und Sport, only 193.3 km/h (120.1 mph) was attained. During 1966 a 3.2 litre engined version providing maximum power output of 129 kW (175 PS) was also under development, but 1966 was the year when the company's precarious finances drove a crisis that resulted, in September 1966, in a take-over by BMW. The 3.2 litre Glas V8 never entered production.

With the Glas model range now under the control of BMW, the Glas company's former rivals, production of the 2600 V8 Glas was ended in August 1967, (although the model continued to be listed until December). In September the 3000 V8 developed under Glas management the previous year appeared on the market, virtually unchanged, except that it carried a BMW badge on the bonnet/hood and was branded as the BMW-Glas 3000 V8. Production of this model ended in May 1968, however, and exactly a year after its appearance it was delisted in September 1968. In contrast with their treatment of the smaller Glas GT, BMW resisted any temptation to give the BMW branded BMW-Glas 3000 V8 a BMW style “twin kidney” grille.

== Production ==
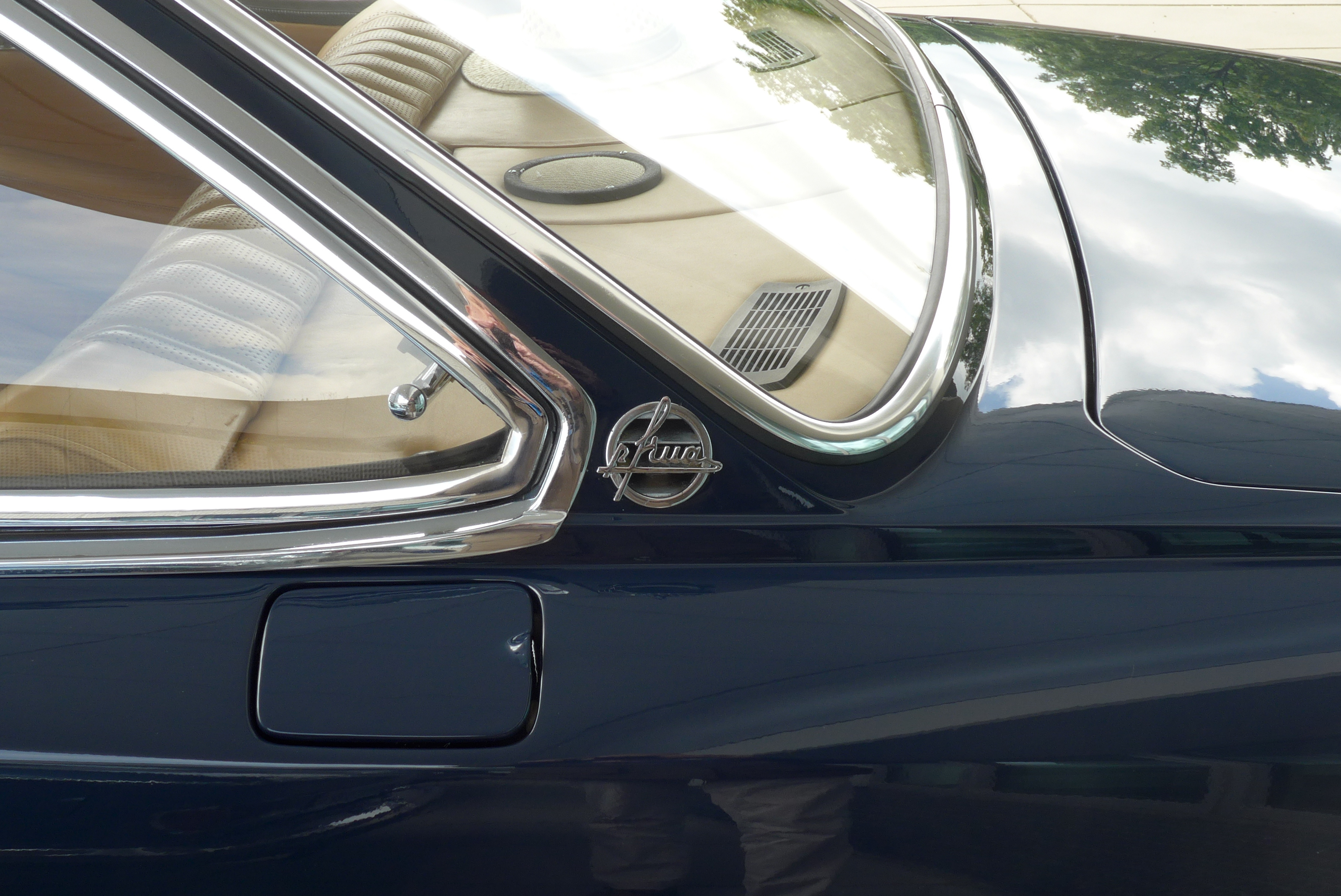
Detail

When the car first appeared at the 1965 motor show, the projected price was a sensationally low DM18,000. By the time cars were available for sale, in 1966, the price was DM19,400, which was still seen as a very competitive price for a low-volume specialist GT. In terms of volumes, sources differ: According to Werner Oswald, the company produced 277 of the 2600 V8s with smaller engines and 389 of the more powerful 3000 V8s.

== Sources and further reading ==
- Hanns-Peter Rosellen: Vom Goggomobil zum Glas V8. Zyklam-Verlag Frankfurt 1985.
- Wiedmaier, Michael (2015). GLAS 2600 & 3000 (in German). Freilassing: WKP-Verlag. ISBN 9783980727174.

This entry is based on information from the German Wikipedia Glas V8 article.
