= Glas GT =

Glas GT Glas 1300 GT Glas 1700 GT BMW 1600 GT
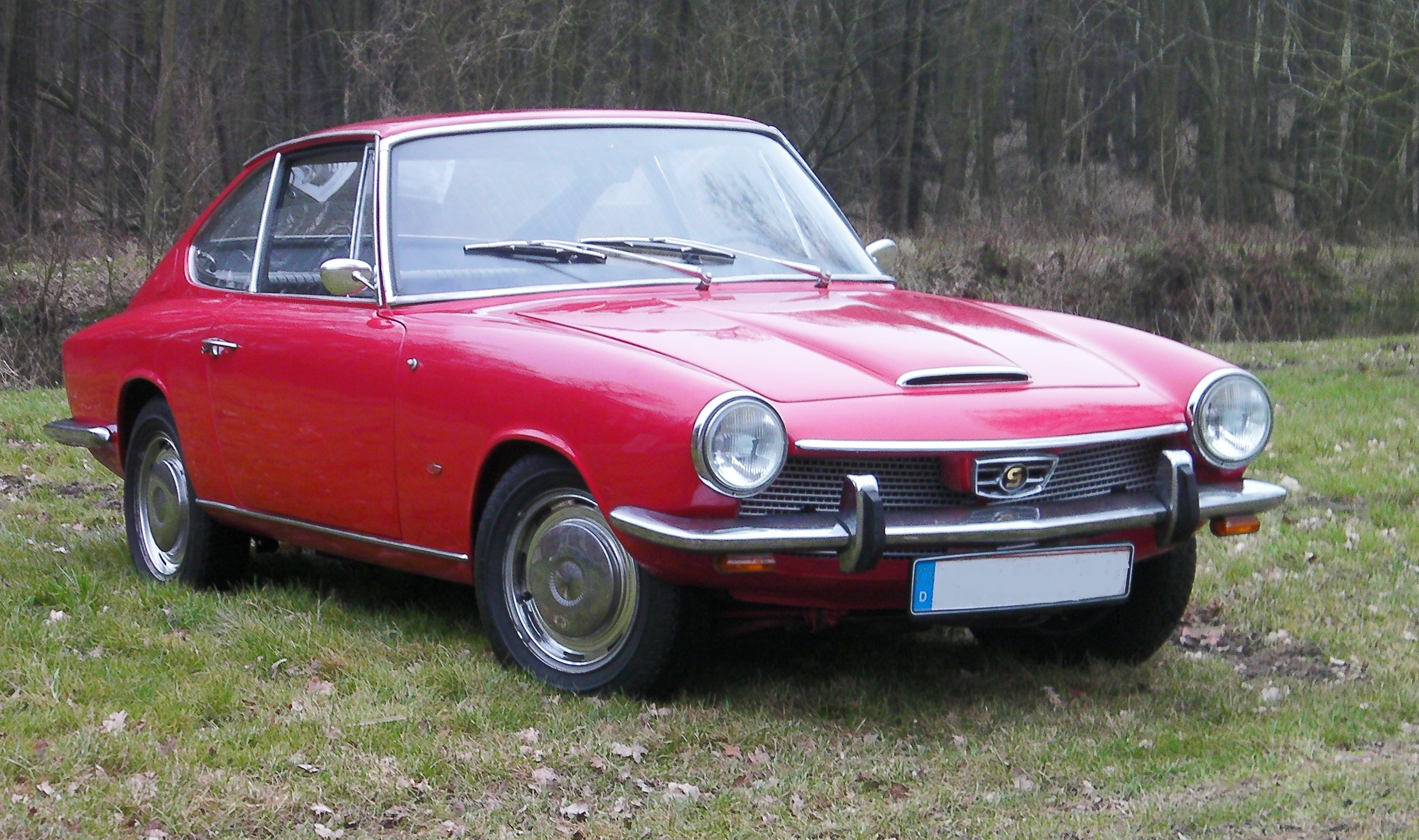
- Glas 1700 GT

Overview
- Manufacturer: Hans Glas GmbH
- Production: March 1964 – August 1967; Coupé bodied: 5,013 units May 1965 – July 1967; Cabriolet bodied: 363 units June 1967 – May 1968; BMW badged: 1,259 units
- Assembly: Germany: Dingolfing
- Designer: Pietro Frua

Body and chassis
- Body style: Coupé, Cabriolet
- Layout: FR layout

Powertrain
- Engine: 1,290 cc (1964–1967); 1,682 cc (1965 – 1967); 1,573 cc (1967–1968)
- Transmission: 4-speed or 5-speed manual

Dimensions
- Wheelbase: 2,320 mm (91.3 in)
- Length: 4,050 mm (159.4 in)
- Width: 1,550 mm (61.0 in)
- Height: 1,280 mm (50.4 in) (coupé); 1,280 mm (50.4 in) (cabriolet)

Chronology
- Successor: BMW 02 Series

The Glas GT is a sports coupé produced by Hans Glas GmbH at Dingolfing. The car was first presented as the Glas 1300 GT in September 1963 at the Frankfurt Motor Show, with volume production starting in March 1964. The much rarer cabriolet version appeared in May 1965 and a larger engined 1700 GT in May 1965.

== 1300 GT ==
Deliveries of the Glas 1300GT began in March 1964. The body was designed by the Piedmontese firm Frua of Moncalieri. The body shells were built in Moncalieri by coach builders Maggiora, then shipped to the Glas factory at Dingolfing for final assembly. The 1,290 cc engine was a bored-out version of the modern unit that had powered the manufacturer’s 1004 model since 1962, with an overhead camshaft. Claimed power output at this point was 55 kW (75 PS) which provided a top speed of 170 km/h (106 mph).

In September 1965 maximum power was increased to 62.5 kW (85 PS). The car was fitted with larger wheels and the top speed rose to 175 km/h (109 mph).

== 1700 GT ==
From September 1965 the cars could be ordered with the 1,682 cc engine from the newly-introduced Glas 1700 TS sedan, which had a maximum power output of 74 kW (100 PS) and a top speed of 185 km/h (115 mph).

The longer stroke of the 1,682 cc engine made the unit slightly taller than the smaller engine fitted in the 1300 GT which necessitated a ridge along the center of the bonnet/hood. Matters were simplified by specifying the same bonnet/hood ridge for all GT models regardless of engine size from the September 1965. The 1700 GT was also homologated for sale in the US, which was then a lucrative market for European sports cars.

== BMW 1600 GT ==
With the BMW acquisition of the Glas business, the GT was refitted to accommodate the 1,573 cc BMW engine already fitted in the BMW 1600. The BMW “new class” models introduced in 1962 had attracted press comment concerning the fact that the engine was canted over at an angle of 30 degrees from the vertical plane, permitting a lower bonnet/hood line, and this feature was retained when the engine was fitted in the Glas GT body to create what was now branded as the BMW 1600GT. By using the BMW engine the car also acquired a further increase in power output, now up to 77 kW (105 PS). Handling was improved by applying the BMW's relatively sophisticated semi-trailing arm rear axle with coil springs in place of the more old fashioned rigid rear axle and leaf spring configuration previously employed by the Glas GT. BMW also took the opportunity to fit “new” round rear lights – being those that from 1966 also featured on the BMW 1600-2, and to reconfigure the front grille to incorporate the BMW “twin kidney” grille.

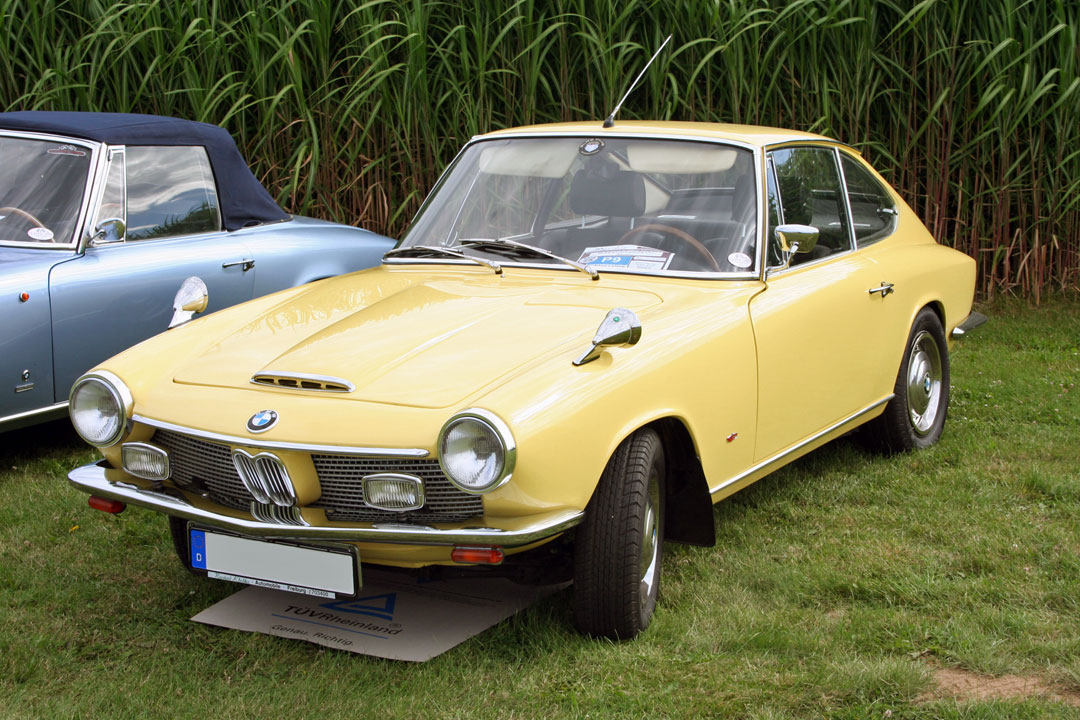
BMW 1600 GT. From summer 1967, during its final year, the Glas GT wore a BMW badge and grille, reflecting its adoption of BMW rear suspension and a BMW engine.

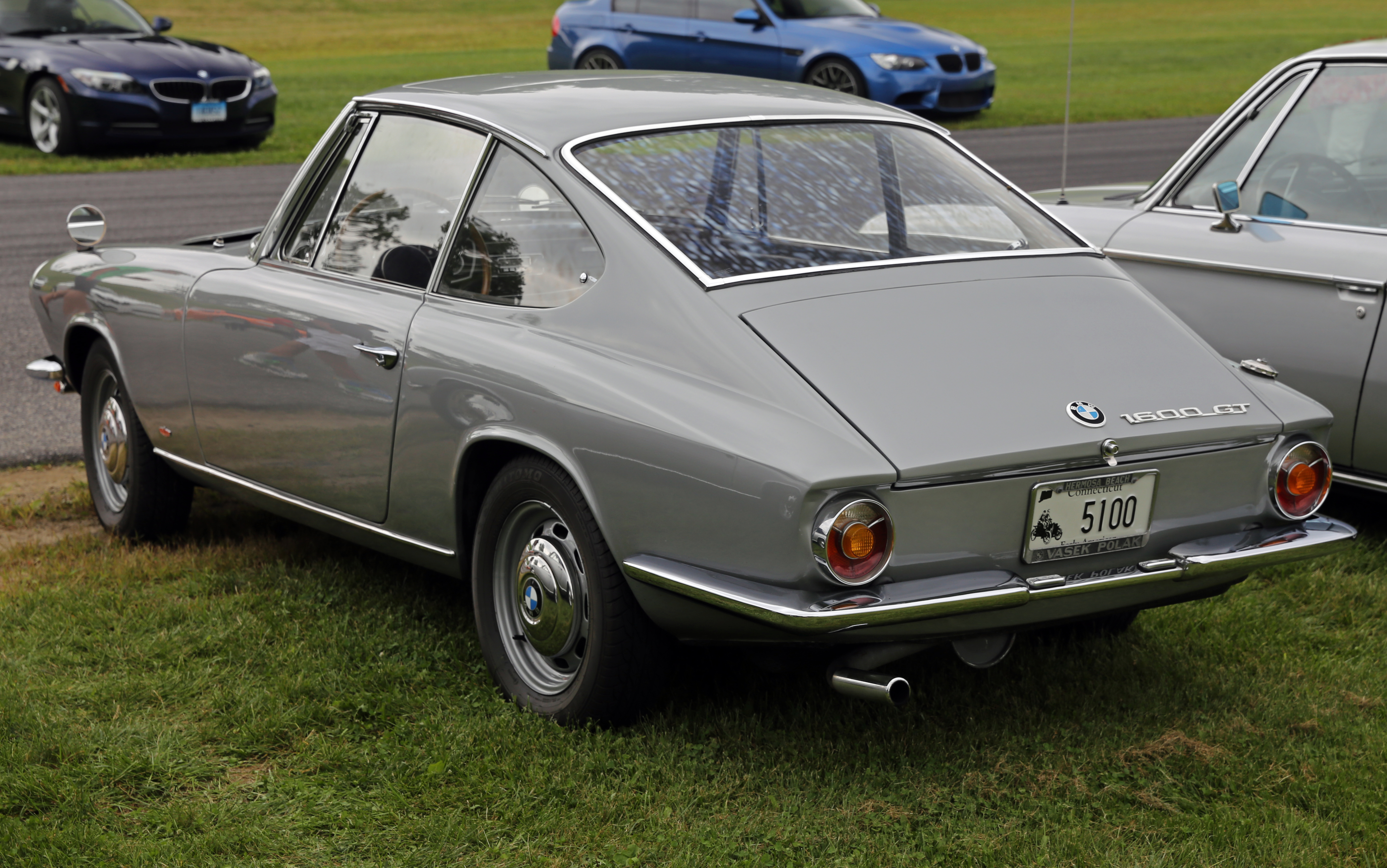
BMW 1600 GT

== Production ==
Between 1964 and 1967 Glas produced 5,376 GTs including 363 cabriolets. Between June 1967 and August 1968 a further 1,259 BMW badged cars were produced.

== Sources and further reading ==
- Rosellen, Hanns-Peter: Vom Goggomobil zum Glas V8, Zyklam-Verlag Frankfurt (1985)
- Jürgen Kraxenberger, Ferdinand Mader: Das grosse GLAS-Buch, ISBN 3-930648-40-7

This entry is based on information from the German Wikipedia Glas GT article.
