= Johann Sziklai =

Johann Sziklai (born 1947 in Dingolfing, West Germany) is a poet and a teacher. He studied English, history, and political science in Tübingen and in Bangor, North Wales. Since 1975, he has been teaching at the Gymnasium in Plochingen am Neckar. Sziklai writes mainly poetry and short prose. His first volume of poetry, Schildkrötenwanderung (migration of the tortoises), was published in 1988. Three additional volumes of poetry have followed. The most recent was published in 1995 and has the title Kreideweißheiten (chalk tales). As the title suggests, in Kreideweißheiten Sziklai takes a hard look at the school system in Germany. Dealing with social and political issues is typical for much of Sziklai's work. His style of clear, brief statements and questions reads like prose and reflects his concerns with the realities of life.

== Sources ==
- Moeller, Jack; Adolph, Winnifred R.; Mabee, Barbara; Berger, Simone (2002), Kaleidoskop (6 ed.), Boston, MA: Houghton Mifflin Company, ISBN 0-618-10312-0
