= Maggiora (manufacturer) =

Italian company

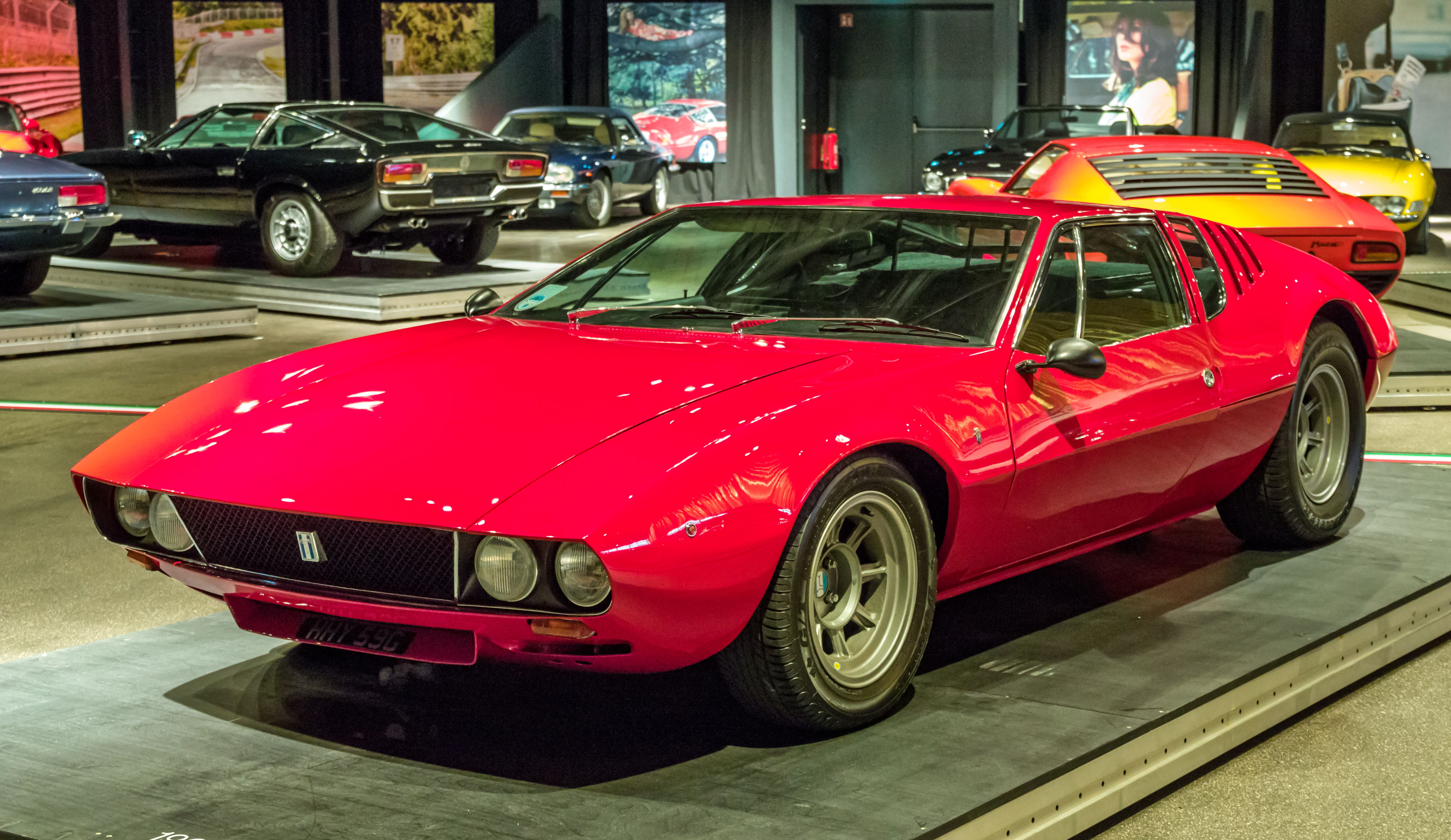
De Tomaso Mangusta

Maggiora was an Italian coachbuilder and parts supplier from Moncalieri near Turin. They produced the Fiat Barchetta and the Lancia Kappa Coupé which was designed by Centro Stile Lancia. The company was shut down in 2003.

== History ==
The company was formed in 1925 as Martelleria Maggiora by Arturo Maggiora as a high quality car body maker - a coach builder or 'Carrozzeria'. Their work has graced many Fiat and Lancia cars. Early work was usually contract work for larger carrozziere, such as the Fiat 1100 Giardinetta for Viotti and the Lancia Flaminia for Touring. The company was grown and extended, with several Abarth and Cisitalia bodies produced. In 1951 it moved to Borgo San Pietro Moncalieri where car like the Glas (BMW) GT (1963), Glas V8 (1965) and the Maserati Mistral (1963) were built. Rocco Motto was a team leader at Maggiora until 1932, when he opened his own workshop. Maggiora biggest seller was the Fiat Panda Furgonetta van derivative, originally developed for SIP (the Italian state telephone company) but so popular that Fiat started selling the model directly as the Panda Van in 1986.

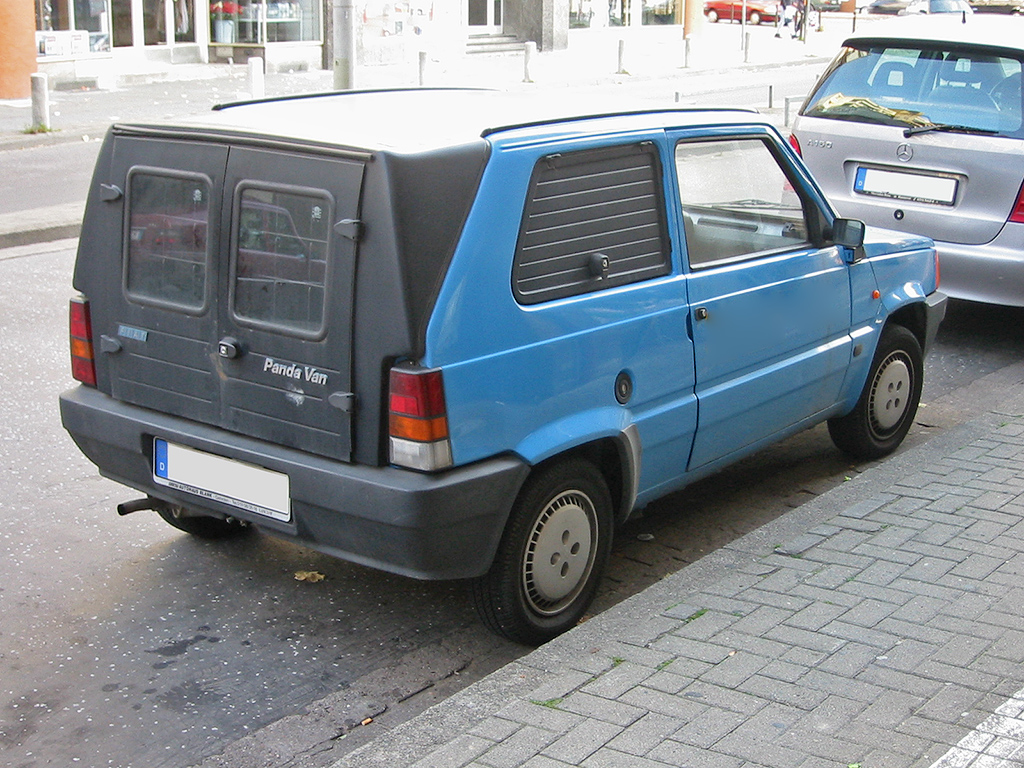
The Panda Van was originally developed by Maggiora as the Panda Furgonetta

Maggiora merged with Sanmarco and Lamier to form the IRMA SpA subsidiary in 1991 - later a major supplier to the Ducato range. Maggiora S.r.l took over the old Lancia factory in Chivasso north of Turin in 1992, and produced the last Integrale Evoluziones there from October 1992 to 1994. The new capacities in the Lancia factory were later used to produce the Fiat Barchetta - at around 50 bodies a day. Some complete cars were produced here too (including the rare Kappa Coupé). A significant share of Maggiora's income came from their production of sunroofs, as well as building special bodies and interiors for commercial users, with major contracts with the Italian energy sector and postal service. Maggiora's Emmedue ("M2") subsidiary built automobile interiors, mainly for the Fiat Group. Maggiora was endeavoring to gain new clients to eliminate their dependency on Fiat, but without much success.

In addition many design studies, prototypes, and special orders were produced by Maggiora; these have included soft top Unos and Cinquecentos, special Integrales, a Barchetta Coupé, a Puntograle, and the Lancia Thesis Coupé prototype. A less proud moment may have been the special-bodied Lancia Kappa produced towards the end of the 1990s for Laurent Kabila, the authoritarian ruler of the Democratic Republic of the Congo.

== Cars produced by Maggiora ==
- Lancia Aurelia B20 (subcontract for Pinin Farina)
- Lancia Flaminia GT/GTL/Convertibile (subcontract for Touring)
- Alfa Romeo 2000 Spider (subcontract for Touring)
- Fiat 2300 S Coupé
- Glas V8
- Maserati Mistral coupé and Spyder
- De Tomaso Mangusta
- Alfa Romeo Junior Zagato
- De Tomaso Pantera
- Fiat Gobi (1984, concept car)
- Fiat Halley (1985, concept car)
- Fiat Panda Furgonetta/Van/Business
- Fiat Cinquecento Cita (1992 concept car, developed with Stola and Itca)
- Fiat Cinquecento Birba (1992, concept car)
- Fiat Scia (1993, concept car)
- Fiat Barchetta (including an RHD prototype)
- Fiat Barchetta Coupé
- Fiat Barchetta Trofeo
- Fiat Armadillo (1996 concept car)
- Lancia Kappa Coupé
- Willys AW 380 Berlinetta

== Gallery ==
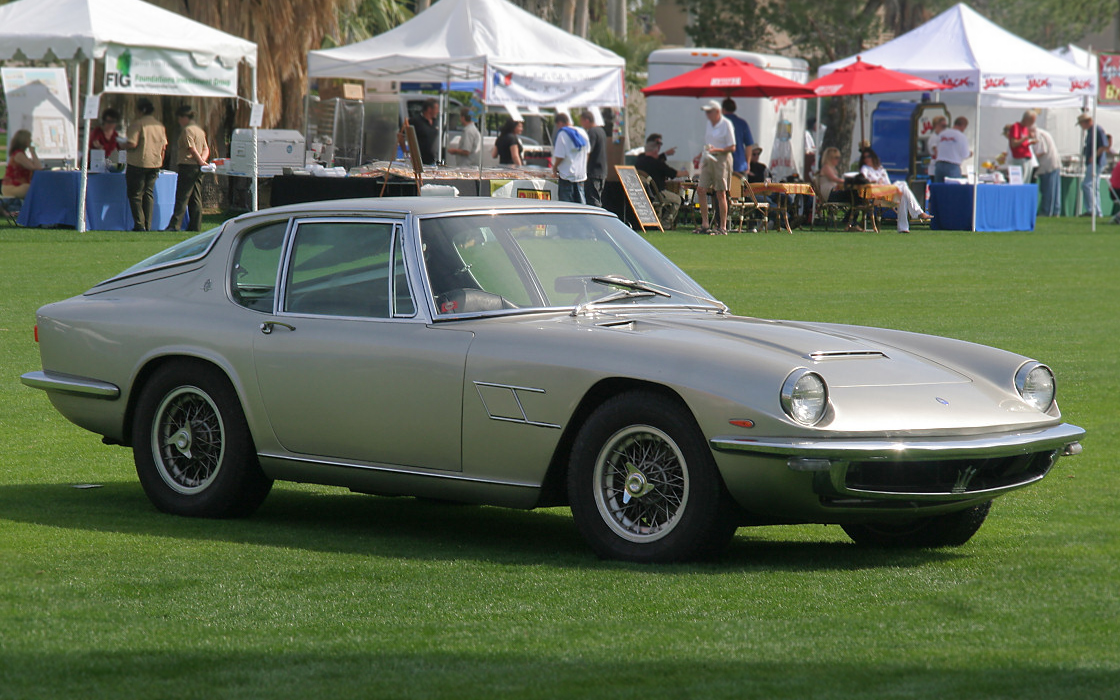
1967 Maserati Mistral

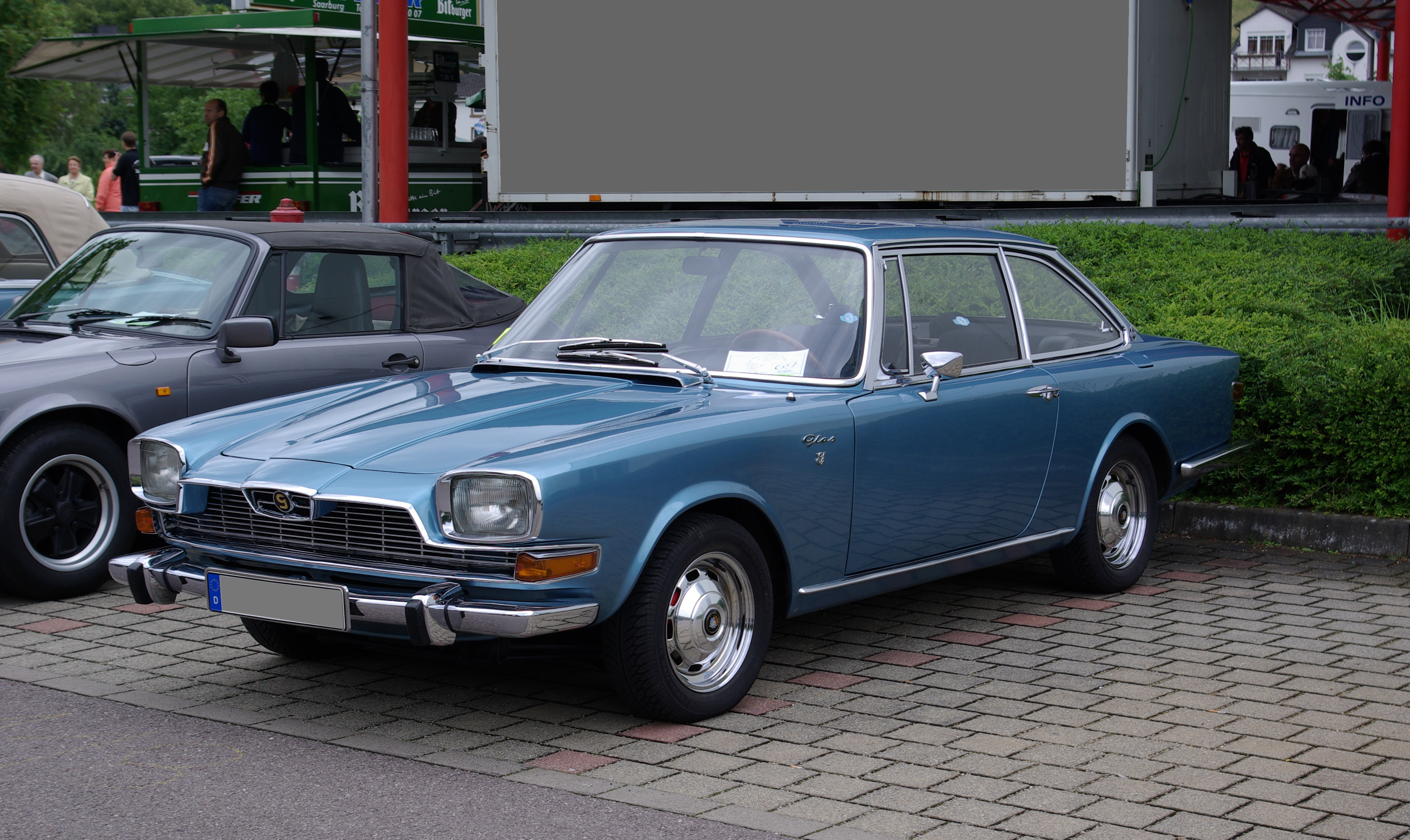
Glas V8

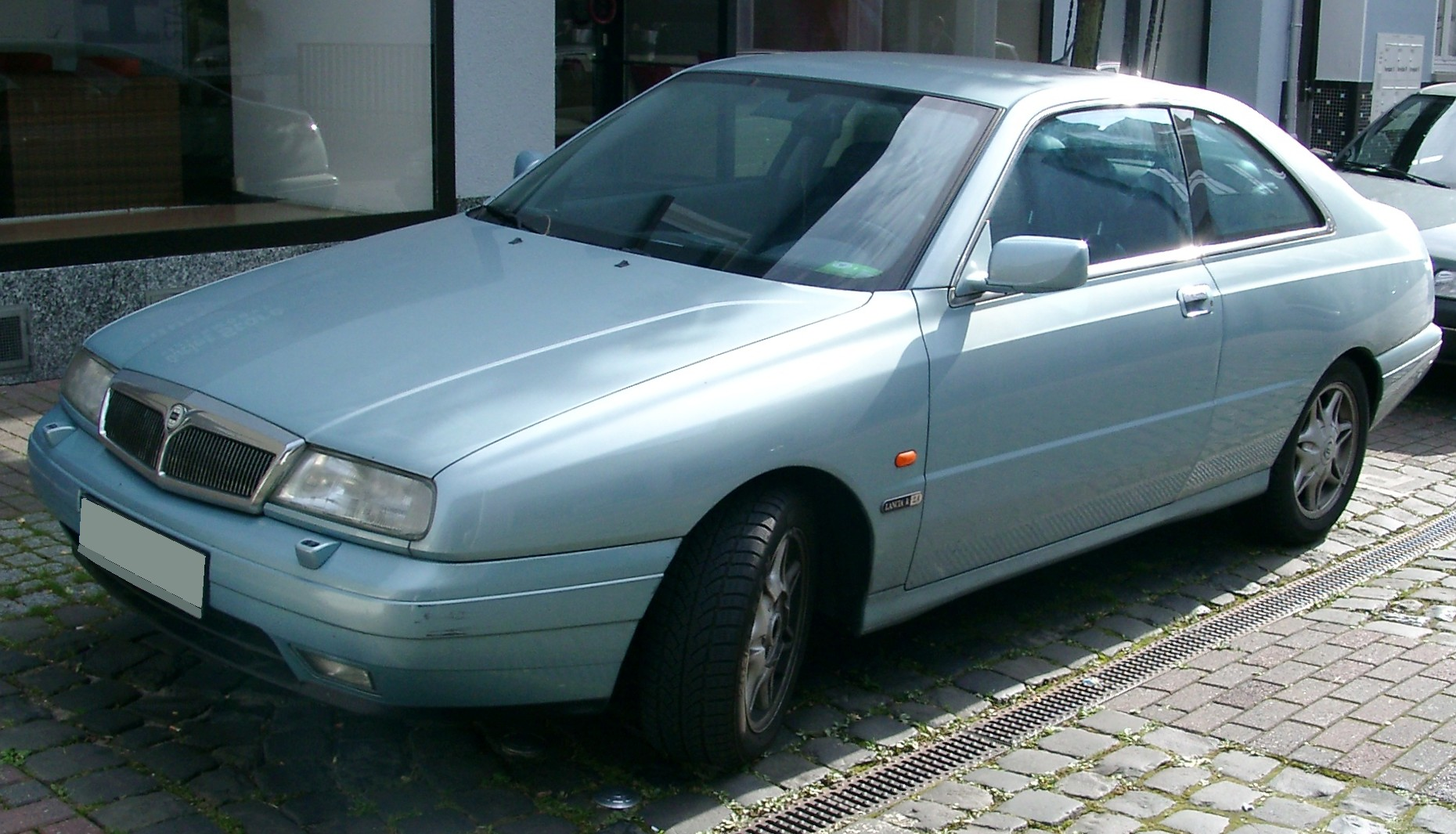
Lancia Kappa Coupé

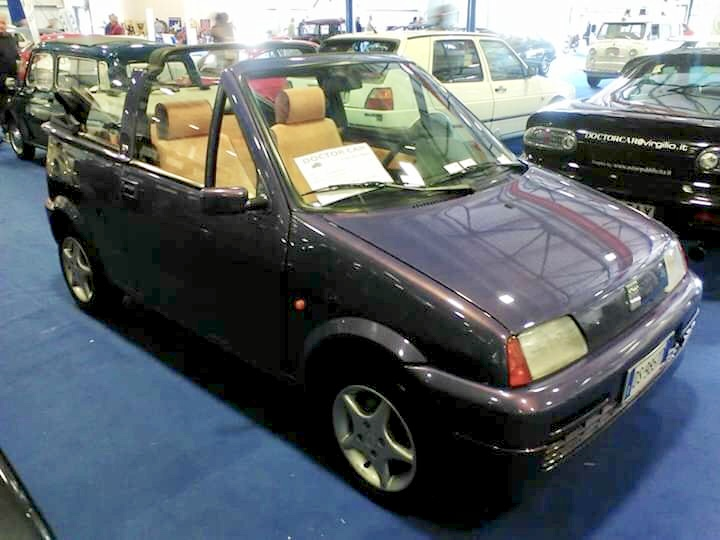
Fiat Cinquecento Birba concept

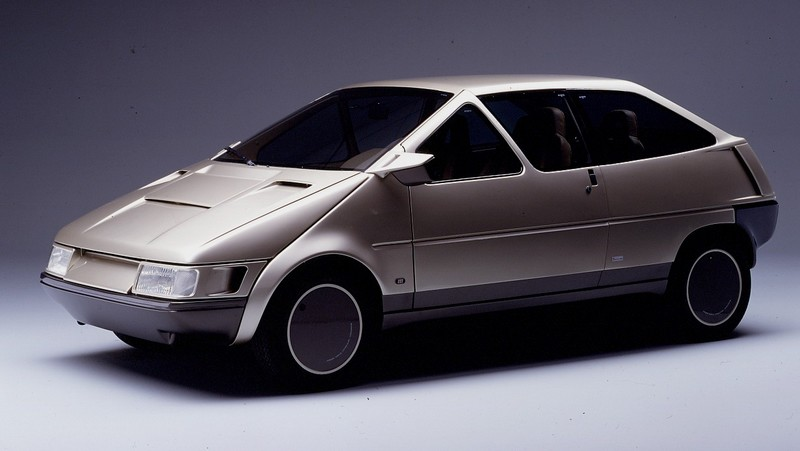
Fiat Halley concept designed by Paolo Martin

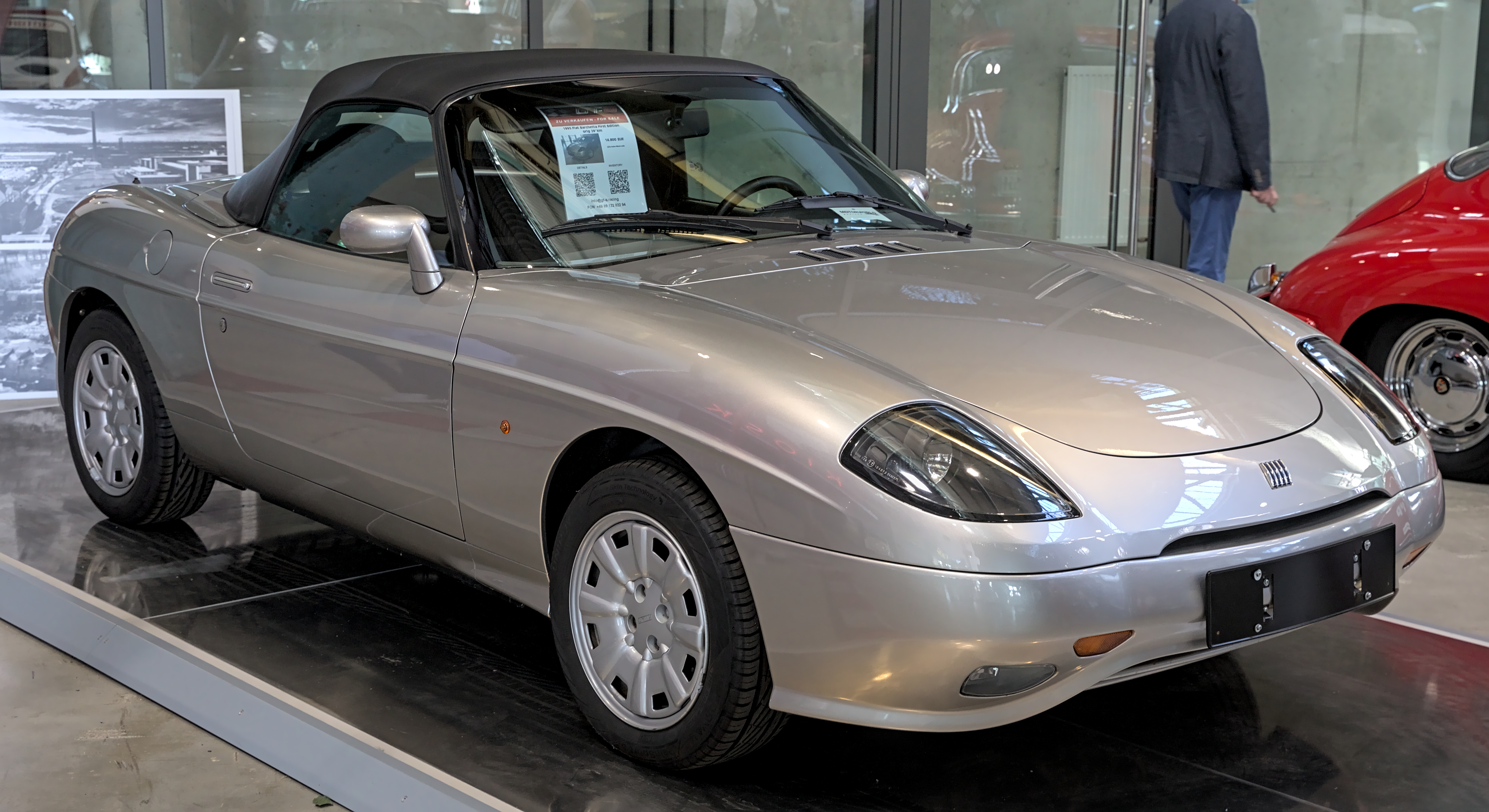
Fiat Barchetta
