= Glas Isar =

Glas Isar T600/700
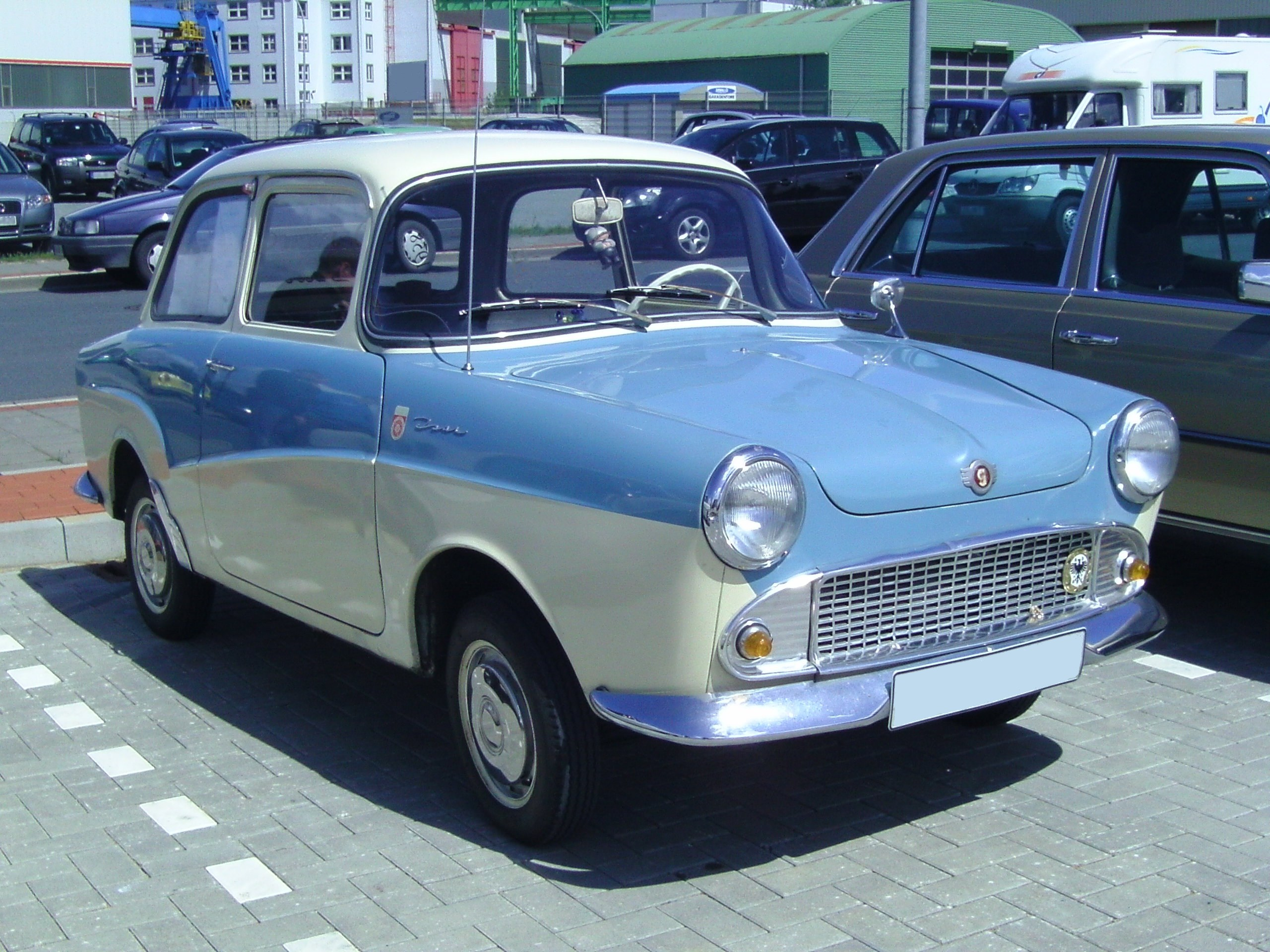

Overview
- Manufacturer: Hans Glas GmbH
- Also called: Glas Isard (some export markets); Goggomobil T600/T700 (1958–1959)
- Production: T600/T700 sedan / saloon: August 1958 – June 1965; 73,311 units K600/K700 Kombi (estate): November 1959 – September 1965; 14,274 units
- Assembly: West Germany: Dingolfing

Body and chassis
- Body style: sedan/saloon kombi/estate
- Layout: FR layout

Powertrain
- Engine: 584 cc H2; 688 cc H2
- Transmission: 4-speed manual

Dimensions
- Wheelbase: 2,000 mm (78.7 in)
- Length: 3,430 mm (135.0 in) until 1960; 3,455 mm (136.0 in) from 1960
- Width: 1,470 mm (57.9 in)
- Height: 1,380 mm (54.3 in)

The Glas Isar is a small two door four seater car produced by Hans Glas GmbH at their Dingolfing plant. The car was first presented as the Goggomobil T600 in September 1957 at the Frankfurt Motor Show, with volume production starting in August 1958.

Initially Glas described it simply as a "big Goggomobil", but in autumn 1959 it was rebranded as the Glas Isar. At the same time a kombi (estate car) version joined the range. A minor facelift occurred in August 1960 and the Isar continued in production until the end of Summer 1965.

The car is named after the Isar river which comes from the Alps, flows through the Bavarian capital Munich and eventually empties itself after a journey of almost 300 kilometres near Deggendorf, where Glas had its headquarters, into the Danube.

== Origins ==
The car that appeared at the 1957 Frankfurt Motor Show was a prototype which in the event differed significantly from the car that entered production the next year, in that it used front-wheel drive. In most other respects, notably regarding the two-cylinder, boxer engine and the overall shape of the car, only minor stylistic changes differentiated the cars that went into production in 1958 from the 1957 prototypes.

The front wheel drive prototype was unstable, however, as the engine was mounted far ahead of the front axle, high above the front-wheel drive power train, in what was a relatively light weight car. Setting the engine further back in relation to the front wheels would have involved a level of re-engineering for which neither time nor money were available. The decision was therefore taken to switch to a rear wheel drive configuration. The late decision led to issues with the gear box, however, which could not be redesigned at this stage and was simply switched round to allow for the fact that the drive shaft pointed in the opposite direction to that previously envisaged. For the driver, this gave rise to a back to front gear change, with first and third speed gear level positions towards the rear and second and fourth positions facing the front of the car.

The late switch to rear-wheel drive threatened to reduce luggage space, while there was ample space between the bonnet and the low profile boxer engine. Glas took advantage of this by repositioning the spare wheel beneath the bonnet, in a cradle above the engine.

== Goggomobil T 600 ==
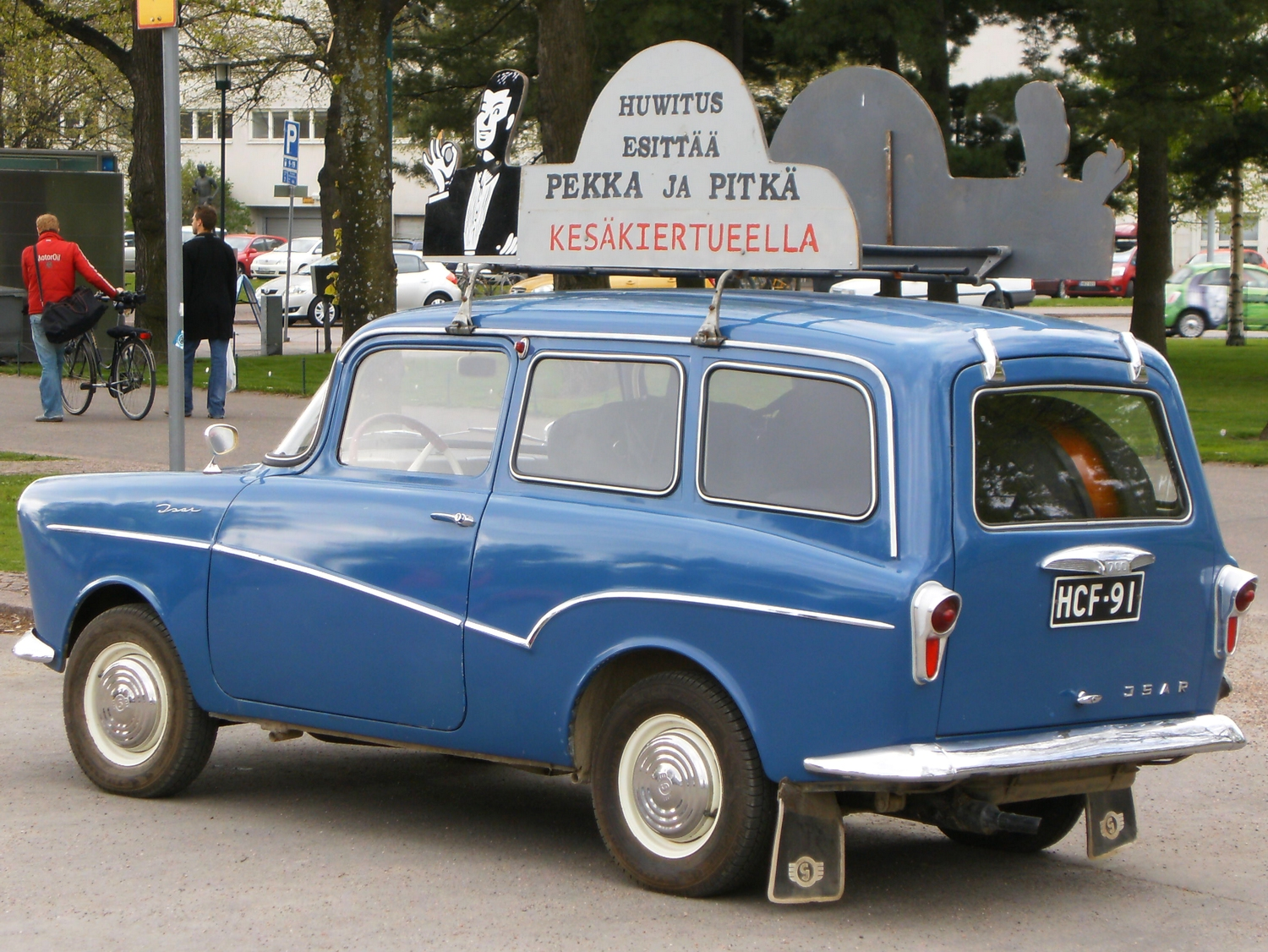
A kombi / small station wagon joined the range at the same time as the car was rebranded as the "Isar" in 1959.

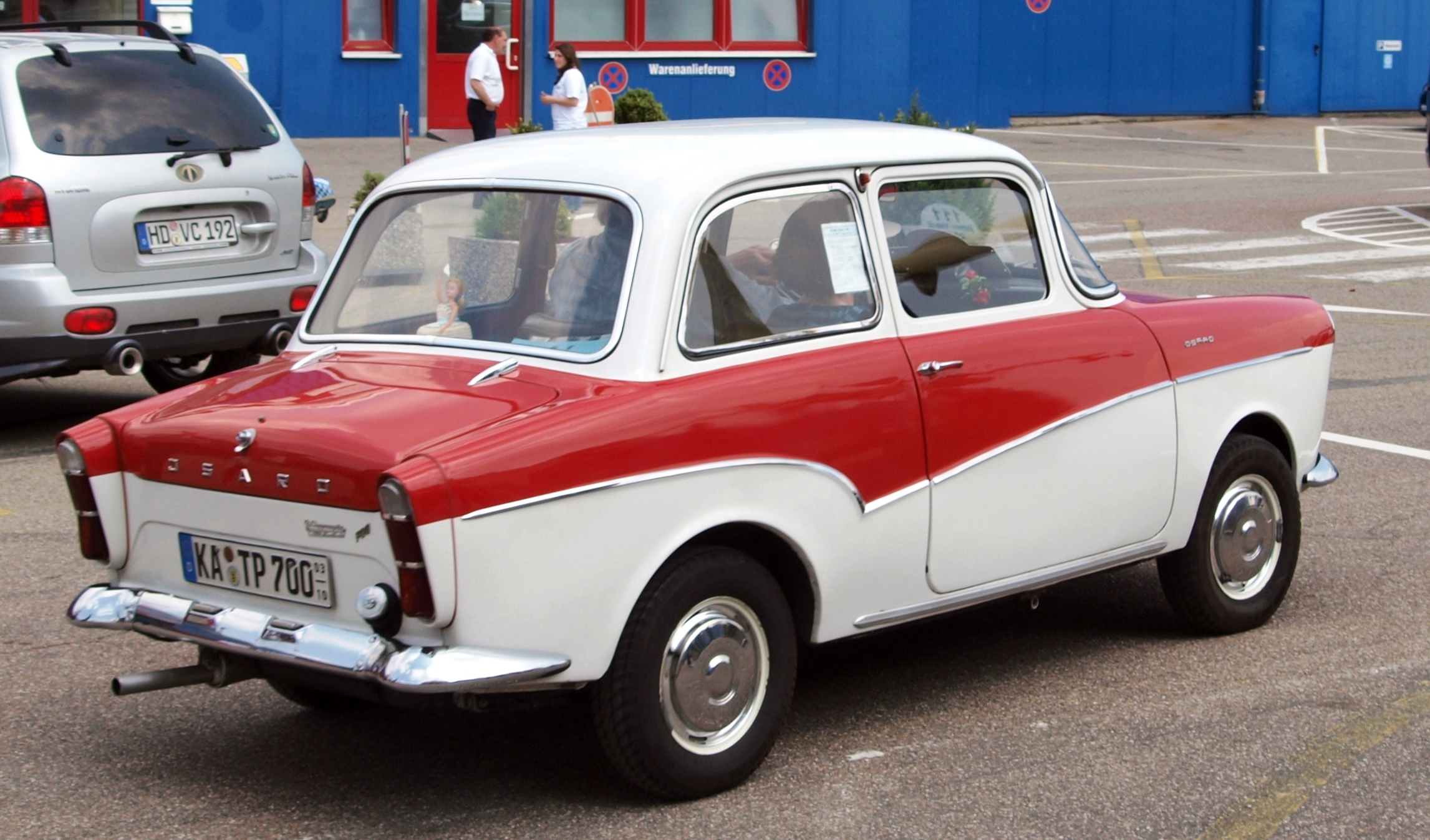
The 1960 modernisation saw the rear lights enlarged and the rear bumper - now (optionally) chrome plated - reshaped to accommodate this change. For certain export markets, as here, the car was branded as the "Isard" rather than as the "Isar" because of a belief that non-German speakers might think the name "Isar" sounded dumm.

Series production of the Goggomobil T600 began on 12 June 1958. The new, two-door four-seater incorporated several then fashionable transatlantic styling features including an eye-catching wrap-around windscreen, small tailfins and a two-tone paint finish. The tail lights followed the approximate silhouette of a small key and were said to resemble those on the stylish Opel Kapitän.

Still at this time considered advanced was the car's monocoque steel bodied construction (without a separate chassis), the rigidity of which was enhanced in 1959 through the addition of reinforcing box section lengths on each side of the floor section. The front wheels were independently sprung and the rear suspension followed the usual pattern of the time, combining a rigid rear axle with leaf springing.

The 584 cc boxer motor developed a maximum power output of 20 PS (15 kW) at 5,000 rpm, which provided for a top speed of 98 km/h (61 mph). The car weighed only about 650 kg (1,433 lb) and was reportedly able to reach an indicated 100 km/h (62 mph) in 61 seconds.

Unusually in an economy car of the period, the T600 incorporated a 12-volt electrical system at a time when the contemporary Volkswagens and German Fords would still come with a 6-volt systems for another ten years.

== Goggomobil T 700 ==
By the time volume production commenced in August 1958, the T600 had been joined by the more powerful T700. In this car the 688 cc boxer motor developed a maximum power output of 30 PS (22 kW) at 4,900 rpm, which provided for a top speed of 110 km/h (68 mph) and reduced by a third the 0–100 km/h (62 mph) acceleration time.

== Name change and range expansion ==
In order to distance the model from the smaller and more minimalist Goggomobil, and possibly also to try and distract from reliability and structural problems that afflicted early cars, November 1959 saw a name change. The "Goggomobil T600" became the "Glas Isar T600" and the "Goggomobil T700" became the "Glas Isar T700". In the manufacturer's Lower Bavarian homeland, the River Isar is the principal river and would have enjoyed a warm resonance with customers, though subsequently, as the company began to implement an export strategy, it was found that customers in some non-German speaking countries thought the name "Isar" sounded "funny" and cars exported to these markets were branded as the "Glas Isard" which was presumably more marketable. Isard is the vernacular name for a variant of Chamois living in the Pyrénées, known as a fast runner and agile climber, making it a difficult target for hunters. The Glas Isard cars marketed in continental Europe sported a stylized Isard on the sales leaflets and sometimes as an additional badge on the bodywork.

The name change was accompanied by the appearance of a three-door station wagon variant which was branded as the Glas Isar K600 or K700, according to engine size.

== Teething troubles ==
Early "big Goggomobils" suffered from serious reliability issues, suggesting an excessively rushed development schedule. The aluminium castings that formed the motor housings deformed at high operating temperatures leading to a doubling of the fuel consumption. Even more alarmingly, until the manufacturer inserted extra strengthening sections under the floor, the body flexed so much on bumpy roads that small cracks appeared and, in extreme cases, the panoramic windscreen would pop out of its frame. Teething troubles on the early T600 and T700 models burdened the manufacturer with high warranty costs and severely damaged the reputation of Glas cars in the market place.

== Facelift ==
The only significant facelift was revealed in August 1960. The cars grew an extra 25 mm (1 in) in length, apparently to accommodate the slightly more prominent rear lights. The option of chrome plated bumpers was added in order to comply with a request made by the US importer. The rear lights were still vertically mounted on the corners of the car underneath little tail fins, but they now became larger and took on a rectangular shape, simpler than hitherto. The rear bumper was reshaped to accommodate the larger lights and the handle for the bootlid was repositioned, along with the light that illuminated the rear license plate. The rear roof was reshaped to allow for a much larger rear window which followed contemporary styling trends and increased visibility.

Buyers of the smaller engined Isar T600 saw the claimed maximum power output reduced from to 20 to 19 PS (14.7 to 14.0 kW). Curiously the claimed maximum speed of the T600 nevertheless increased to 105 km/h (65 mph). In September 1959 the design of the carburetor had been changed and the supplier switched from Bing to Solex. In 1960, possibly reflecting the increasing minimum octane levels of available fuels, the compression ratio was raised slightly, and the reduction in claimed power also coincided with one of the two changes to the lower gear ratios implemented during the car's life.

There was no significant facelift between 1960 and 1965, but towards the end of the production run, the car acquired a black synthetic leather covering on the dashboard. In the final cars, the Isar's original seats and steering wheel were replaced by those from the newer and slightly larger Glas 1004.

=== Glas Isar Ranch ===
At the behest of the Italian Glas importer, Fattori & Montani S.p.A., Pietro Frua designed a beach car on the Isar 700's underpinnings in 1964. It was a typical beach car design, with no doors, four seats, semi-exposed wheels, and a rudimentary canvas hood. The first example was displayed at Frua's stand at the 1964 Turin Motor Show. Only three examples were built, with the third one ending up as Frua's personal car.

== Production ==
Between 1958 and 1965 Glas produced 73,311 Isar saloons and, between 1959 and 1965 a further 14,274 Isar kombis. 57% of the saloons and 88% of the kombis were delivered with the larger 688 cc engine. .

Between 1960 and 1965 the Isar was also built (badged as the Isard) at the company's plant in Argentina where it is remembered as one of the most popular cars of the 1960s.

== Sources and further reading ==
Rosellen, Hanns-Peter: Vom Goggomobil zum Glas V8, Zyklam-Verlag Frankfurt (1985), ISBN 3-88767-075-2

This entry includes information from the German Wikipedia Glas Isar article.
