= Glas (company) =

Former German automotive company

Hans Glas GmbH
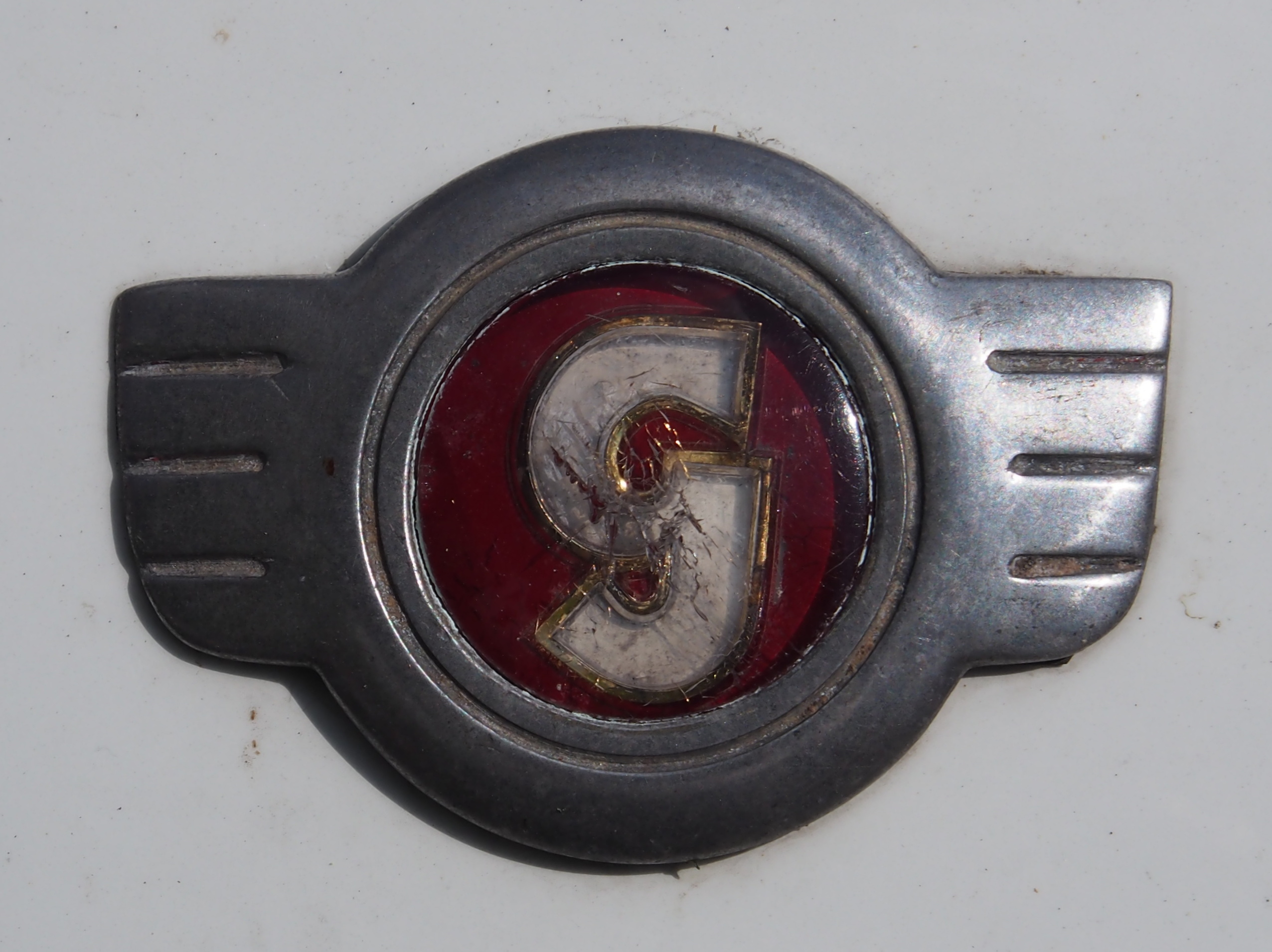
- Industry: Automotive
- Founded: 1883; 143 years ago (as agricultural machinery)
- Defunct: 1966; 60 years ago
- Fate: Takeover by BMW
- Headquarters: Dingolfing, Germany
- Key people: Hans Glas; Andreas Glas
- Products: Automobiles, Agricultural machinery

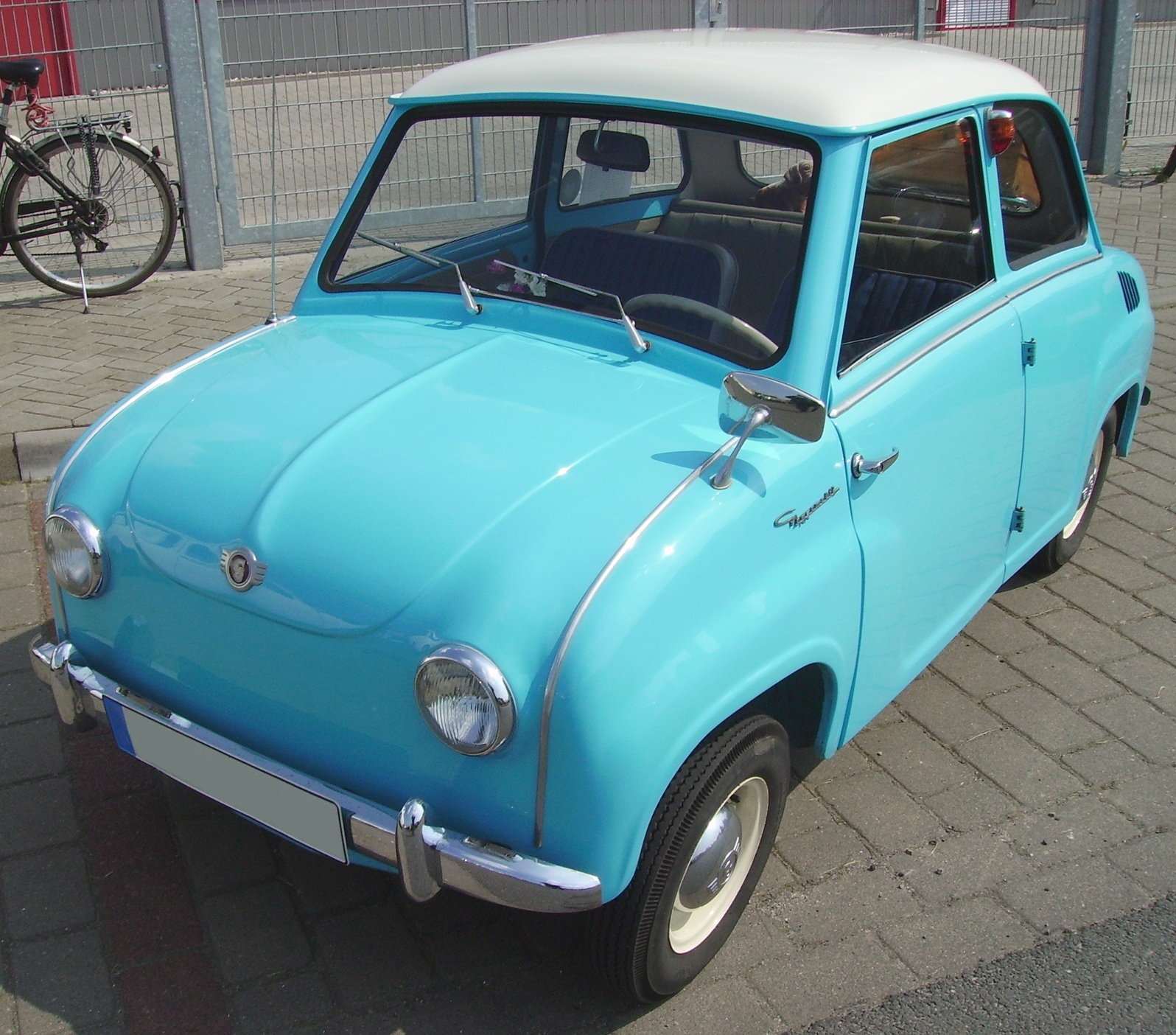
Glas Goggomobil 250

Hans Glas GmbH is a former German automotive company, which was based in Dingolfing. Originally a maker of farm machinery, Glas evolved first into a producer of motor scooters, then automobiles. It was purchased by BMW in 1966, mainly to gain access to Glas's patents; they were the first to use a timing belt with an overhead camshaft in an automotive application. Its limited model range was shortly phased out by its new parent.

== History ==
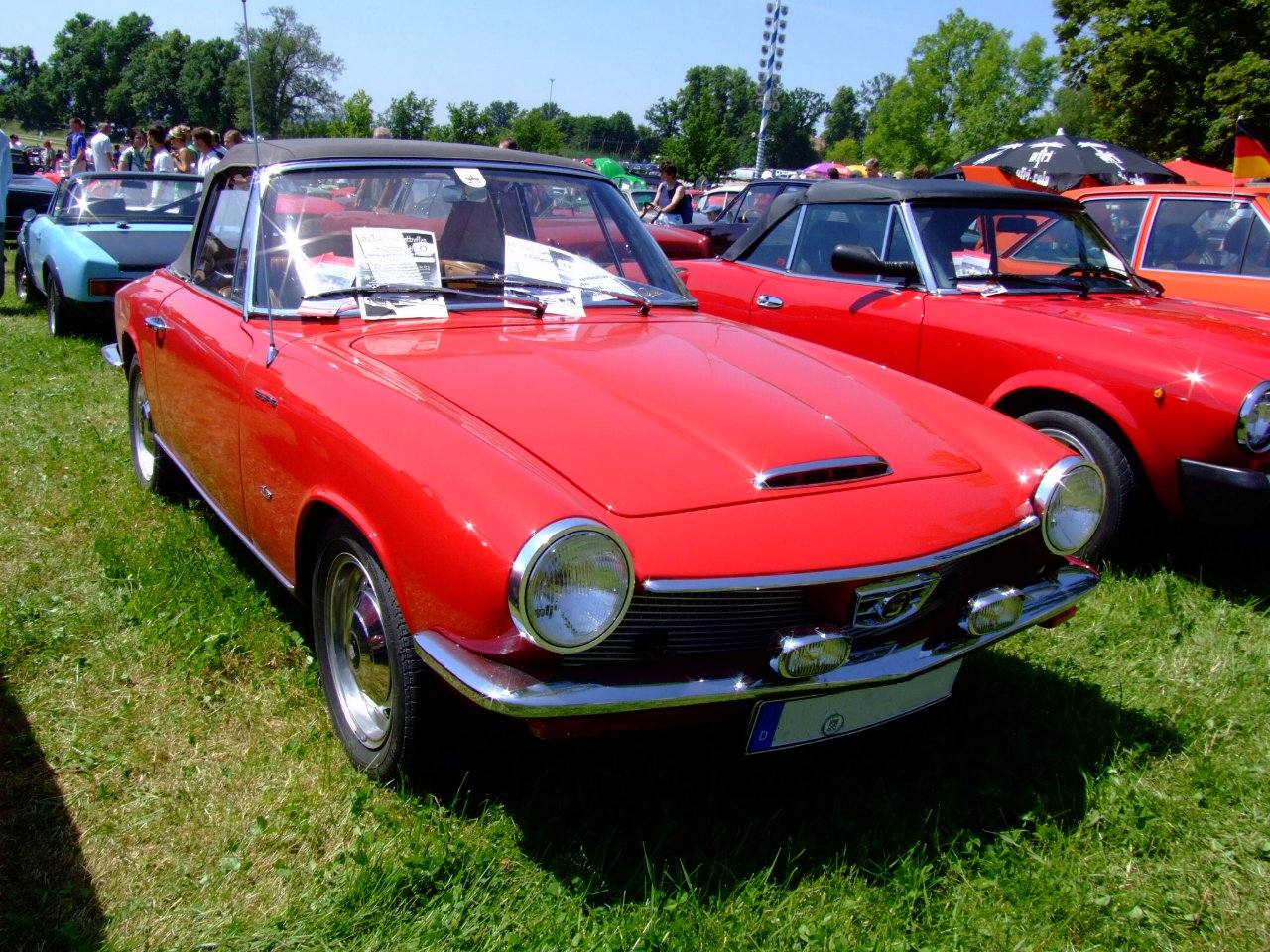
Glas 1700 GT Cabriolet, 1965

Mechanic Andreas Glas (born 1857, son of Maurus who founded the first agricultural machinery factory in Bavaria in Freising in 1860) founded his own repair company for agricultural machines in 1883 in Pilsting. He named the company Andreas Glas, Reparaturwerkstätte für landwirtschaftliche Maschinen mit Dampfbetrieb (in English: Andreas Glas, repair-shop for steam-powered agricultural machines). During the summer periods about 16 people worked for him. In 1905 Andreas Glas' company built their first crop sowing machines (seed drill). He then had sufficient work to employ all his employees during the winters. The production of seed drills rose from year to year:

Winter period 1905/06 - 10 seed drills
Autumn 1906 - 20 pieces
Winter period 1906/07 - 40 machines
1907 - 60 pieces
Winter period 1907/08 - 254 seed drills.

1906 Andreas Glas partnered with a financer becoming Glas & Lohn and changed its brand name from Bavaria to Isaria; the partnership ended in 1911. 1908 Glas production moved to Dingolfing to overcome the mandatory rule which forbade non-local factories from participating in the important local agricultural machine exposition. The new factory started with 150 seed drills per year. The production count rose each year. 1920 Glas Werke AG became a share company partnering with Stumm Group. 1924 Hans Glas (1890-†1969) became CEO of Glas Werke AG. 1931 failure of the Stumm Group. 1933 Hans Glas bought Glas Werke by the shareholders

After World War II, the market for seed drills was declining, and the company began building little carrows and later working machines for bakers along with seed drills. 1949 Glas Werke becomes a family company renamed Hans Glas GmbH (Ltd) involving son Andreas (1923-†1990) and daughter Hertha.

== Products ==
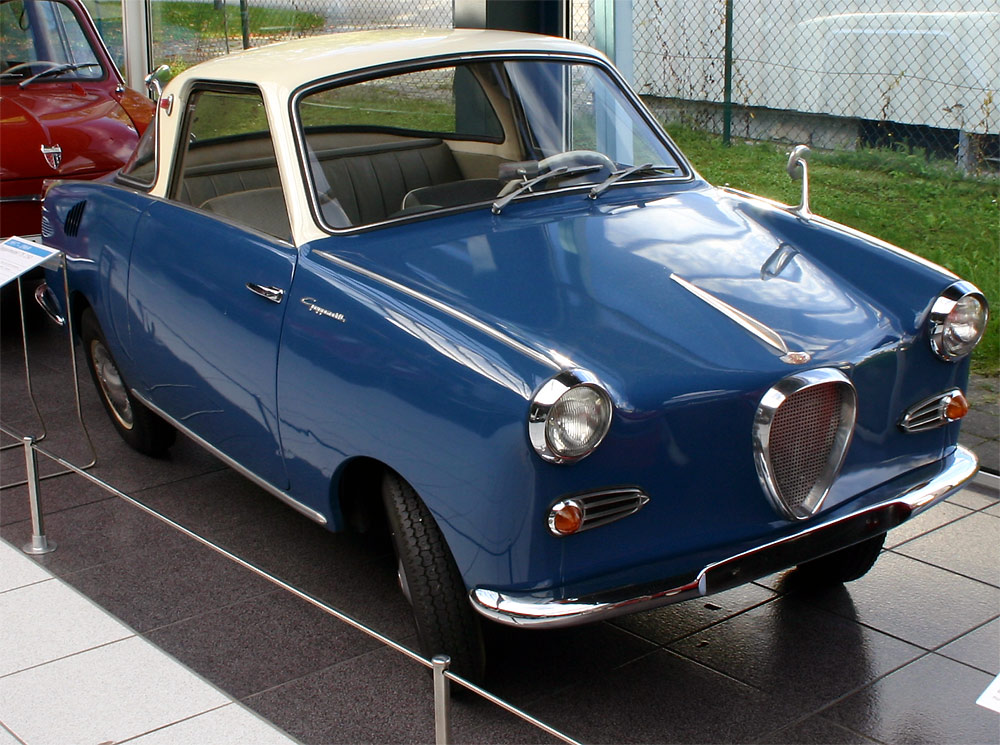
Goggomobil TS 250 Coupe.

Glas were known for small cars like the Goggomobil. However, in 1964 the company introduced the Glas 1300GT coupe and later the 1700GT. The body was designed by Pietro Frua. However competition, mostly from British cars, was tough and in 1966 they released the 2600GT powered by a SOHC V8 engine, with a volume just under 2.6 litres. However this didn't help and later the same year the company was sold to BMW. The Glas models were kept in production by BMW, but fitted with BMW engines. The Glas 1300 GT coupe was fitted with a 1.6-litre BMW engine and renamed BMW 1600 GT. BMW also fitted a 3-litre engine and named it 3000 GT. This model kept the Glas name, but had a BMW logo in the front and rear. In 1968 BMW created their own large coupe, the BMW 2500 CS, and this meant the end for Glas. 277 copies of 2600 GT were made and 389 of the 3000 GT.

=== Scooters ===
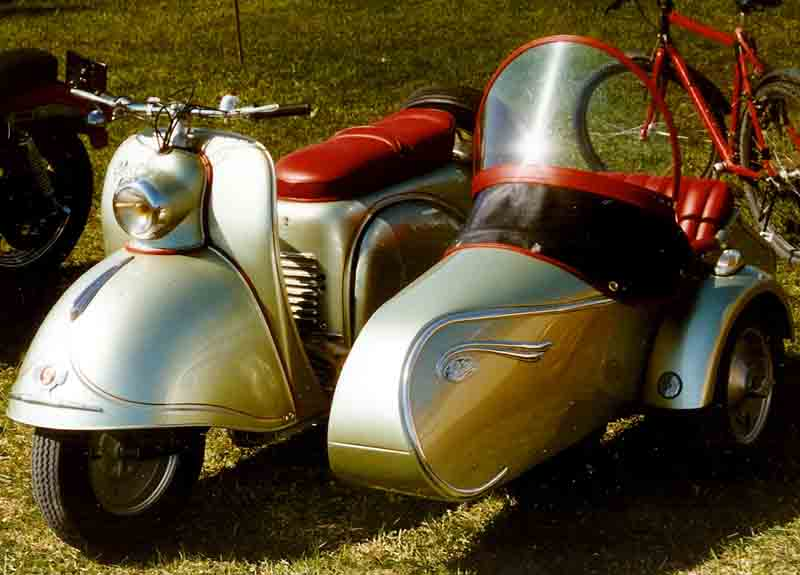
Glas Goggo scooter with sidecar

In 1951 Andreas Glas (1923–1990), son of Hans Glas, saw the Vespa scooter from Piaggio in an agricultural machines exposition in Verona, Italy. He was so enthused that he began production of motor scooters that July.

The scooter debuted with a 125 cc motor, increased over time to 150 cc and 200 cc. Until 1956 46,181 motor scooters were built. Production of scooters stopped because of the Goggomobil cars. From 1953 on, load-carrying scooters were built as well. With the 200 cc engine and 9.5 bhp, they had a load capacity of 200 kg.

=== Cars ===
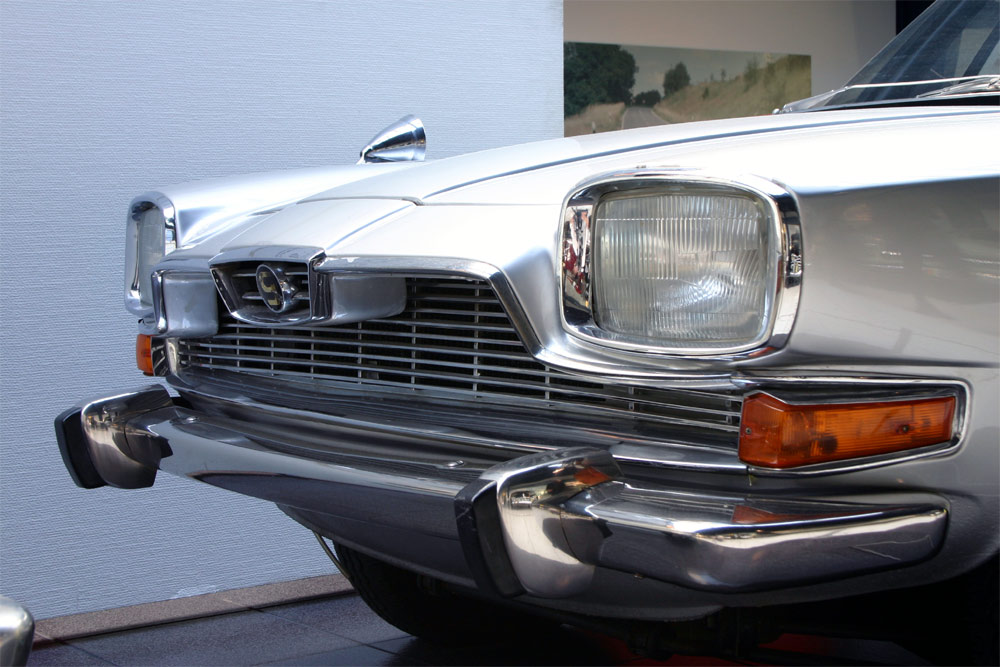
A 1966 Glas 2600 with Glas logo, nicknamed Glaserati

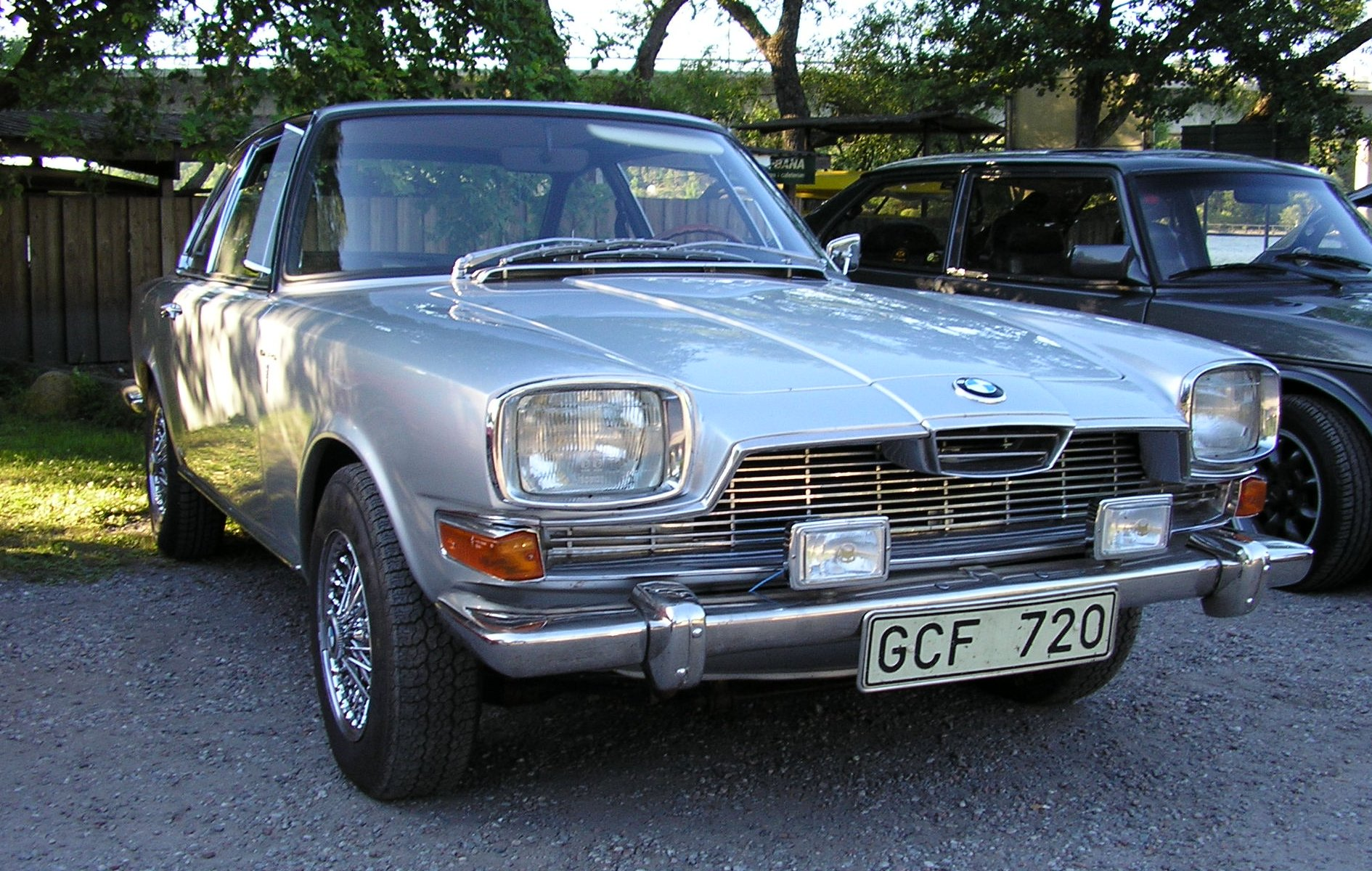
A 1968 BMW Glas 3000GT. Notice the BMW logo in the front, but that it otherwise doesn't look like a BMW.

- Goggomobil T250, T300, T400, Sedan (1955–1969), Coupé (1957–1969), Transporter (1957–1965)
- Glas Isar T600, T700 (1958–1965)
- Glas 1004, 1204, 1304 (1962–1968)
- Glas 1300 GT, 1700 GT (1963–1967)
- Glas 1700 (1964–1968)
- Glas 2600 V8, 3000 V8 ("Glaserati") (1966–1968)

== Absorption by BMW ==
In 1962 BMW released the BMW 1500. The popular four-door compact's success exhausted the production capacity of the Munich plant. In 1966 the management decided to buy Glas and absorb the Glas model line. Most of Glas' existing lineup was retired, while some models ended up being badged as BMWs until the company was fully absorbed. It was reputed that the acquisition was mainly to gain access to Glas' development of the timing belt with an overhead camshaft in automotive applications, although some saw Glas' Dingolfing plant as another incentive. However, this factory was outmoded and BMW's biggest immediate gain was, according to themselves, a stock of highly qualified engineers and other personnel. The Glas factory began the manufacture of BMW front and rear axles until they could be modernized and fully incorporated into BMW.

BMW immediately retired most of the Glas range, including all of the outdated microcars.

=== Changes under BMW ===
- The 04-type, the GT and the 1700 sedan were given BMW badges in the last year of their production.
- The GT was reengineered and so it was built with a BMW engine and rear axle and sold as BMW 1600 GT until 1968.
- The V8 got a bigger engine constructed by Glas and was also sold until 1968 as BMW-GLAS 3000 V8.
- The 1700 sedan was built and sold by a South African importer with several changes as BMW 1800 SA until 1974.
- The Goggomobil T300, T400, T400 Coupé (renamed Sport), Glas Isar T700 and the Glas 1204 were licensed for manufacture in Argentina during the 1960s.

=== Closure ===
In the late 1960s BMW shut down Glas and built entirely new production facilities, which would eventually become an important production site. In June 1969, the final Glas vehicle, a Goggomobil, rolled off the production line. As of 2008, BMW's Dingolfing branch is BMW's largest factory in Europe, with 22,000 workers producing 5, 6 and 7 Series cars and as well as bodies for Rolls-Royce.
