= Glas 1700 =

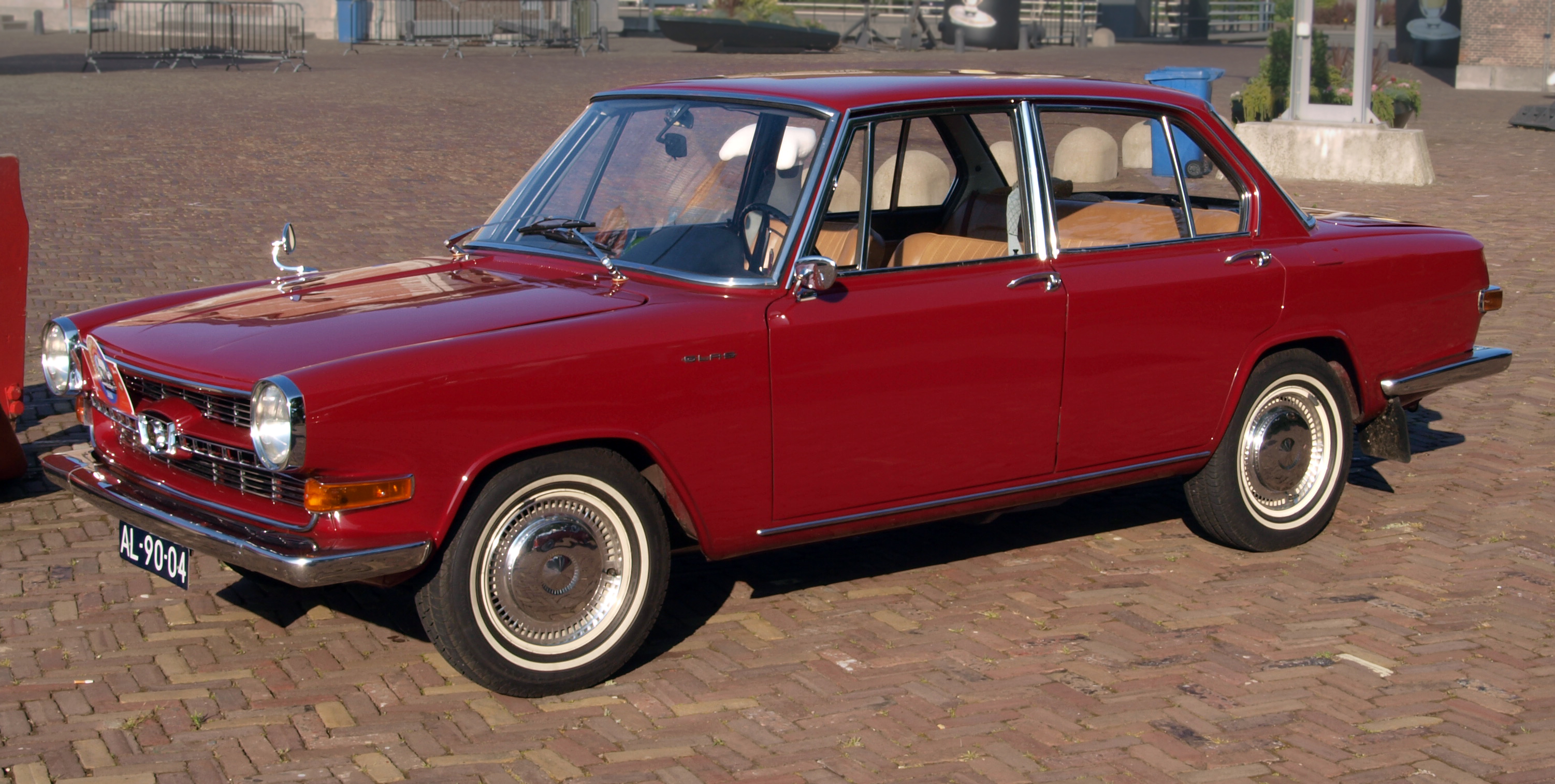

Overview
- Manufacturer: Hans Glas GmbH
- Also called: BMW 1800SA/2000SA
- Production: August 1964 – July 1967; 13,789 built
- Assembly: West Germany: Dingolfing
- Designer: Frua

Body and chassis
- Class: Mid-size car
- Body style: 4-door saloon
- Layout: FR layout

Powertrain
- Engine: 1682 cc SOHC I4
- Transmission: 4-speed manual 4-speed automatic (from July 1966)

Dimensions
- Wheelbase: 2,500 mm (98 in)
- Length: 4,415 mm (173.8 in)
- Width: 1,610 mm (63 in)
- Height: 1,390 mm (55 in) (loaded)

The Glas 1700 is a middle class four door saloon produced by Hans Glas GmbH at Dingolfing. The prototype was first presented (at this stage as the Glas 1500) in September 1963 at the Frankfurt Motor Show. Later versions of the coupé and cabriolet bodied Glas GT were also powered, in some cases, by the same engine as the saloon. The saloon was produced between August 1964 and December 1967, but the manufacturer never had the investment capital sufficiently to expand production capability and the model was discontinued after the by now badly indebted manufacturer was acquired by BMW.

== Origins ==
The Glas 1300 GT launched in 1963 had been developed by the Piedmontese firm Frua of Moncalieri, and a contract had at the same time been entered into for the development of a new middle class saloon. Frua had at this stage recently worked for the northern company Borgward to develop a successor for the company’s Goliath 1100, to be known as the Hansa 1300 (and sometimes incorrectly described as an intended successor to the successful Borgward Isabella). The Hansa 1300 project was a success for Frua even though, followed the bankruptcy of the Borgward business, the Hansa 1300 never entered volume production.

The car which Frua now developed for Glas was very similar to the still-born Hansa 1300. Both cars featured the Hofmeister kink which was gaining wider notability as a striking feature of new BMW designs in the 1960s and subsequently. Glas bored out their existing 1290 cc unit to give an increase in engine size to 1489 cc, and it was in this form that the car, with a claimed power output of 51 kW (70 PS) was initially introduced to the public in September 1963.

== Production model ==
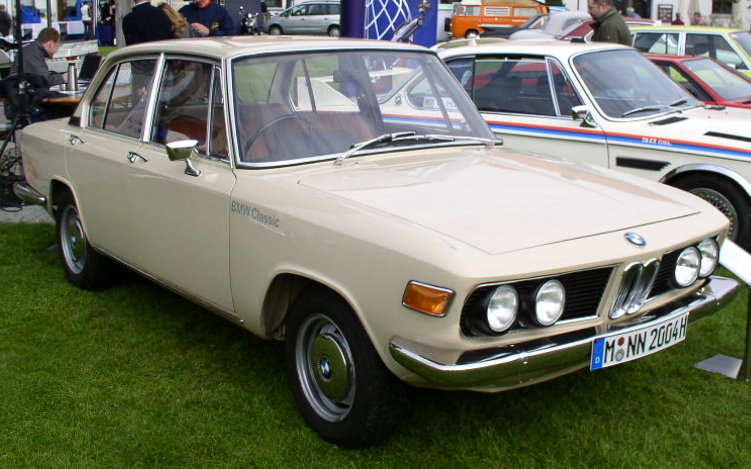
After BMW pulled the plug on Glas production in Germany, the car reappeared in South Africa sporting a BMW front and powered by a BMW engine.

Not for the first time with a new model from Glas, the car introduced at the 1963 Frankfurt Motor Show was far from ready for volume production. It became clear that the performance available from the 1489 cc unit was insufficient for a middle-weight saloon with sporting aspirations. Similar conclusions had already been reached on the competitor from the rival manufacturer BMW who in 1961 had introduced the BMW 1500, a similarly sized sports saloon, only to introduce a more powerful version, the BMW 1800, in 1963.

A year after the launch of the Glas 1500 in September 1963, the car appeared as the Glas 1700, its engine size now further increased to 1682 cc by adopting a longer stroke, and providing a claimed maximum power output of 80 PS (59 kW) at 4,800 rpm. A maximum speed of 150 km/h (93 mph) was quoted, and the option of automatic transmission was advertised, although the first car with an automatic gear box fitted would be produced only in 1966. By now series production had started, in August 1964, following the annual holiday shutdown, although volumes were still constrained by lack of cash for investment.

A year later, in September 1965, claimed power from the standard engine increased further to 85 PS (63 kW) at 4900 rpm and the maximum speed to 155 km/h (96 mph).

=== 1700 TS ===
The 1965 Frankfurt Motor Show also saw the introduction of the faster Glas 1700 TS. Engine capacity for the version was unchanged at 1682 cc, but the standard car’s single carburetor was replaced with twin carburetors. The compression ratio increased in the configuration from the standard car's 8.5:1 to 9.5:1 or 9.7:1, suggesting the manufacturer was taking advantage of the wider availability of higher octane fuels which was a feature of motoring in much of western Europe at this time. For the 1700 TS maximum power was quoted as 100 PS (74 kW) at 5,500 rpm and maximum speed cracked through the 100 mph (160 km/h) threshold at 170 km/h (106 mph).

== Production ==
Glas were never able to afford the investment in production facilities and a dealership network that would have enabled the car to compete on level terms with the Opel Rekord or the BMW 1800/2000. Nevertheless, 13,792 Glas 1700 saloons were produced in Germany, including 928 of the higher performance 1700 TS models and 284 cars fitted with four-speed automatic transmission

BMW took over Glas in 1966. The Glas 1700 competed directly with BMW's own BMW 1800 which was already being produced and sold in far greater volumes than Glas had achieved. BMW no doubt valued the engineering expertise that they acquired with the Glas business and they certainly valued the huge scope for expansion at the company's Dingolfing production site, which was developed during the 1960s to become BMW's largest car plant. But BMW saw no reason to nurture the low volume products developed by the Glas business and by December 1967 the last Glas 1700 was produced.

== Afterlives ==
With Glas under BMW control, the model enjoyed an afterlife in South Africa where BMW models appeared combining the Frua-designed body of the Glas 1700 with BMW engines and underpinnings, and a BMW front later grafted onto the nose. These cars were branded as the BMW 1800 GL and BMW 2000GL and sold between 1968 and 1973. They were subsequently rebadged as the BMW 1804 and BMW 2004 and continued to be sold in South Africa in 1973 and 1974, with new cars still available in late 1975.

BMW SA versions derived from the Glas 1700 were also assembled in Rhodesia as the BMW Cheetah.
