= Dingolfing =

Town in Bavaria, Germany

- Town
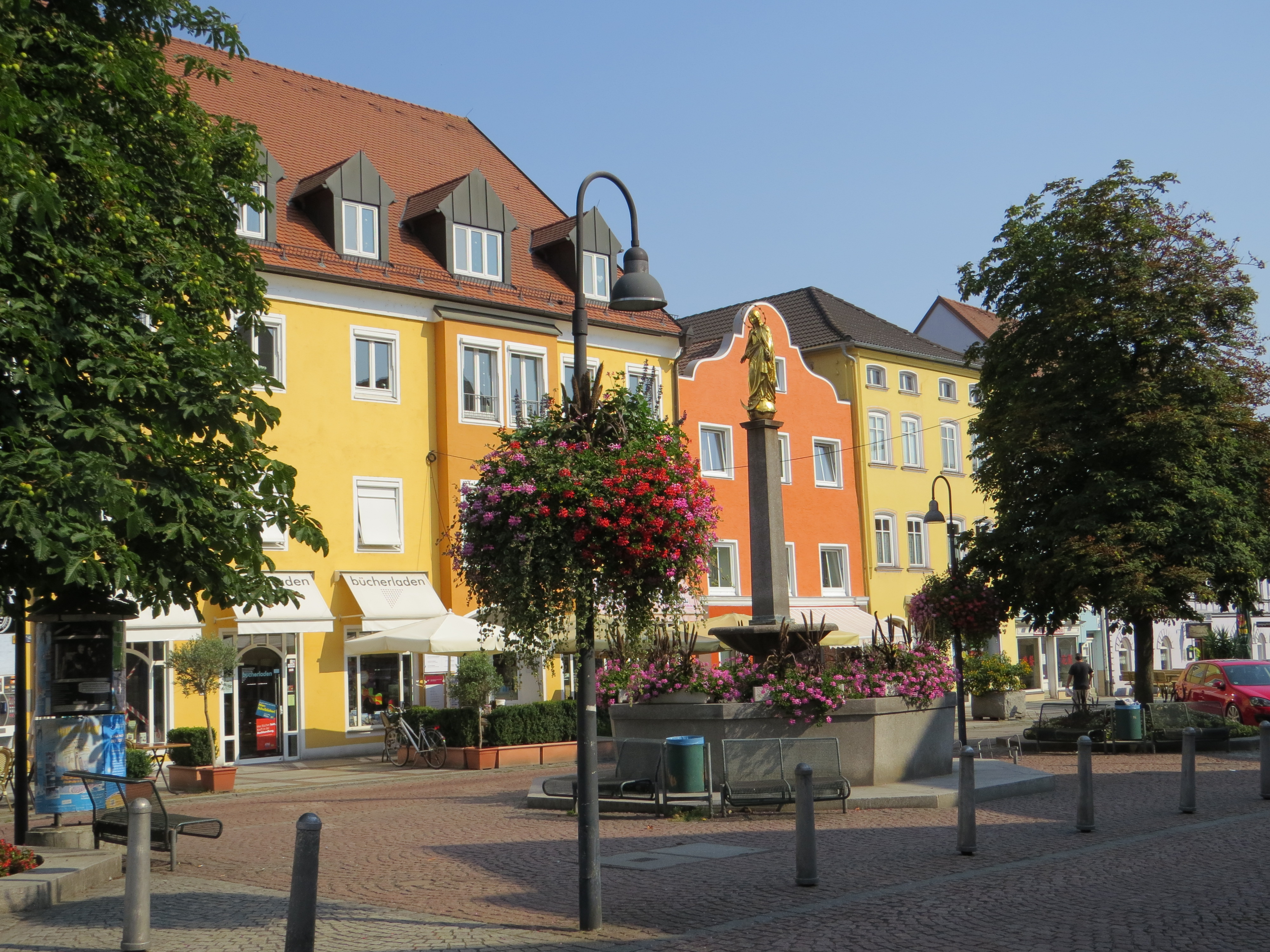
- Marienplatz

- Coat of arms

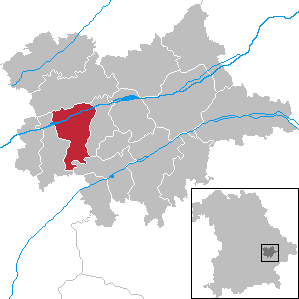
- Location of Dingolfing within Dingolfing-Landau district
- Interactive map of Dingolfing
- Location within Germany Location within Bavaria
- Coordinates: 48°38′N 12°30′E
- Country: Germany
- State: Bavaria
- Admin. region: Niederbayern
- District: Dingolfing-Landau

Government
  - Mayor (2020–26): Armin Grassinger

Area
  - Total: 44 km^{2} (17 sq mi)
- Elevation: 365 m (1,198 ft)

Population (2025-12-31)
  - Total: 20,890
  - Density: 470/km^{2} (1,200/sq mi)
- Time zone: UTC+01:00 (CET)
  - Summer (DST): UTC+02:00 (CEST)
- Postal codes: 84130
- Dialling codes: 08731
- Vehicle registration: DGF
- Website: www.dingolfing.de

Dingolfing (German pronunciation: [ˈdɪŋɡɔlfɪŋ]) is a town in southern Bavaria, Germany. It is the seat of the Landkreis (district) Dingolfing-Landau. Dingolfing is home of a BMW assembly plant.

== History ==
The area now called Dingolfing was first mentioned in Tinguluinga in the year 833.

In the year 1251 the duke of Bavaria, Otto II. awarded municipal rights to the town, which was the Upper City. The Lower City, around the church of St. John's, was an older settlement belonging to the Prince-Bishopric of Regensburg. By treaty of 1265 between Duke and Bishop, both cities were united.

Dingolfing's large growth took place during the years of about 1315 to 1600. During this time the city prospered mostly through trade, fishing, leather craft and the production of wool cloths. The duke promoted these works, causing Dingolfing to prosper even more.

The war of Austrian succession caused very heavy damage to the city and decimated the population by epidemics. The city became nothing more than debris and ash on May 16, 1743 after being fired upon by Austrian troops. Greater parts of the city were burnt in a large fire. Many of the town's records were destroyed in this fire.

Between 1802 and 1803 the local courts were dissolved. Between 1816 and 1817 there were many economic and harvest failures. There was also a period of large price increases. This period is thought to be the lowest point in the long history of the city.

A railroad track leading from Munich to Prague and many new roads were built in the mid-19th century, which began a major turn-around for the city. Many new industries formed in Dingolfing around this time too. The region began to paint a new picture of itself.

In 1905 a new machine shop opened to repair broken farming equipment. After the Second World War this shop changed its business and began producing scooters and automobiles. In the 1950s the plant began producing automobiles under the Glas car company. BMW bought the facility in 1967. Known today as BMW Group Plant Dingolfing, the plant produces the 3 Series GT, the 4 Series, the 5 Series, the M5, the 6 Series GT, the 7 Series, the 8 Series, and the iX. With 330,000 vehicles made in 2018, the Dingolfing plant has the highest production volume of any BMW plant in Europe.

After 1945 and especially since the 1970s Dingolfing intensified its investments in its urban infrastructure, including schools, hospitals, and housing for the elderly.

== Geography ==
Dingolfing is located on the Isar river. Dingolfing is about 100 km northeast of Munich, the capital of the German state of Bavaria, and about 30 km east of Landshut and 25 km south of Straubing. The Isar divides the city into the older historical section of the city on the right side of the river (historically divided into the Upper City and the Lower City), and the area of the former farming villages Goben, Geratsberg, Höll and Sossau, where much residential development in recent decades has grown to a newer section of the city on the left side of the river.

== Demographics ==
View chart definition.

== Important buildings ==
- Parish church St. Josef, a monumental hall church planned by Robert Vorhoelzer, 1954–1956

== Economy ==
The most important industry in the Dingolfing-Landau region is automobile construction. Dingolfing is home to BMW's largest production facility which produces around 270,000 cars (BMW 5, 6, 7, 8 series and also the M5 and M6) each year. Hans Glas GmbH began as makers of agricultural equipment in 1895 and were bought by BMW in 1966.

== People from Dingolfing ==
- Heinrich Deubel (1890–1962), Nazi SS concentration camp commandant. He resided in Dingolfing after the war but was not born there.
- Peter Högl, SS officer in World War II
- Marco Sturm, former NHL forward, was born in Dingolfing on September 8, 1978.
- Johann Sziklai, poet
- Michael Wimmer, football coach

== Coat of arms ==
The coat of arms displays:
- The blue and white checkered pattern of Bavaria
- Three gold stars, representing the upper and lower town of Dingolfing and the parts on the left bank of the Isar river.

== Literature ==
- Joseph Wolfgang Eberl: Geschichte der Stadt Dingolfing und ihrer Umgebung. Dingolfing 1856 online (Google Books)
