= Current Motor Company =

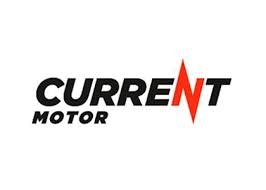
- Company type: Private
- Industry: Automotive
- Founded: 2008; 17 years ago in Ann Arbor, Michigan, USA
- Founders: John Harding, Erik Kauppi
- Fate: Dissolved
- Owner: Belle Capital

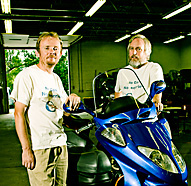
John Harding (L) and Erik Kauppi, co-founders of Current Motor Company, circa 2011.

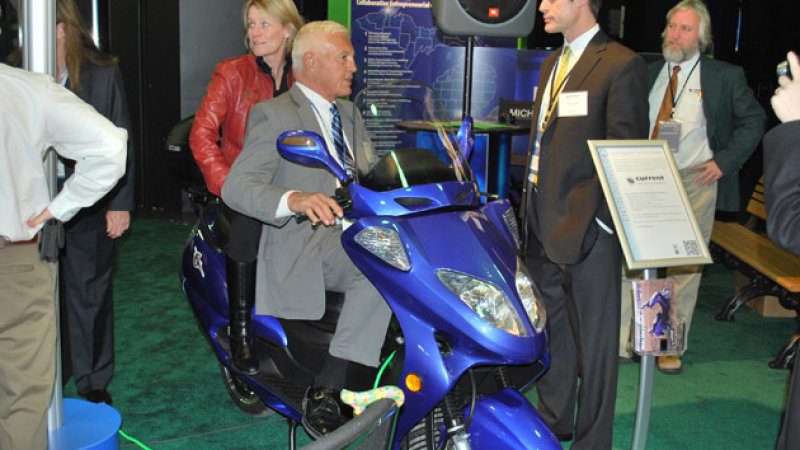
Bob Lutz on a Current Motor Company C-series Scooter

Current Motor Company was a designer and manufacturer of all-electric maxi-scooters. Founded in Ann Arbor, Michigan, they marketed several scooter designs.

== History ==
The company was co-founded in 2008 by Ann Arbor area residents John Harding, an entrepreneur and electric vehicle enthusiast, and Erik Kauppi, an engineer and inventor. Both had prior experience in the Detroit-area automotive industry. Having imported and evaluated several Chinese-made electric scooters, and, not being satisfied with their features or quality, Harding joined with Kauppi to develop their own vehicle.

Over the following two years several electric maxi-scooter models were developed using a maxi-scooter chassis made by Jonway of Zhejiang, China, Lithium iron phosphate battery cells and multi-phase rear wheel hub motors. The pair also engineered their own battery management system, wiring harness, digital instrument panel, vehicle telematics system, swing arm, battery box, and suspension. These vehicles were introduced as the C Series, consisting of the C130, C124, and C120 models, each with differing levels of power, range, top speed, curb weight, and MSRP. A "Test Pilot" program championed by former GM executive and investor Bob Lutz allowed early adopters to purchase a scooter at a discounted price in return for providing feedback and serving as a testbed for the vehicle's telematics software and other systems. Lutz also chaired Current Motor's Advisory Council.

In 2011, Belle Capital, LP, a Michigan-based early stage angel fund, acquired majority ownership of the company and Lauren Flanagan was named president, replacing Harding (who subsequently left the company in 2012). In late 2013 the company introduced their "Mini Fleet" package that included four C-Series scooters paired with a mobile solar charging station. In February, 2015 the "Mini-Fleet-in-a-Box" was introduced along with the "Nb" scooter, which, in contrast to the C-Series, was based on a chassis totally designed and manufactured in-house.

As of May 1, 2018 the official company website was replaced by a holding page stating that the domain name had expired.
