= Taoist art =

Art genre

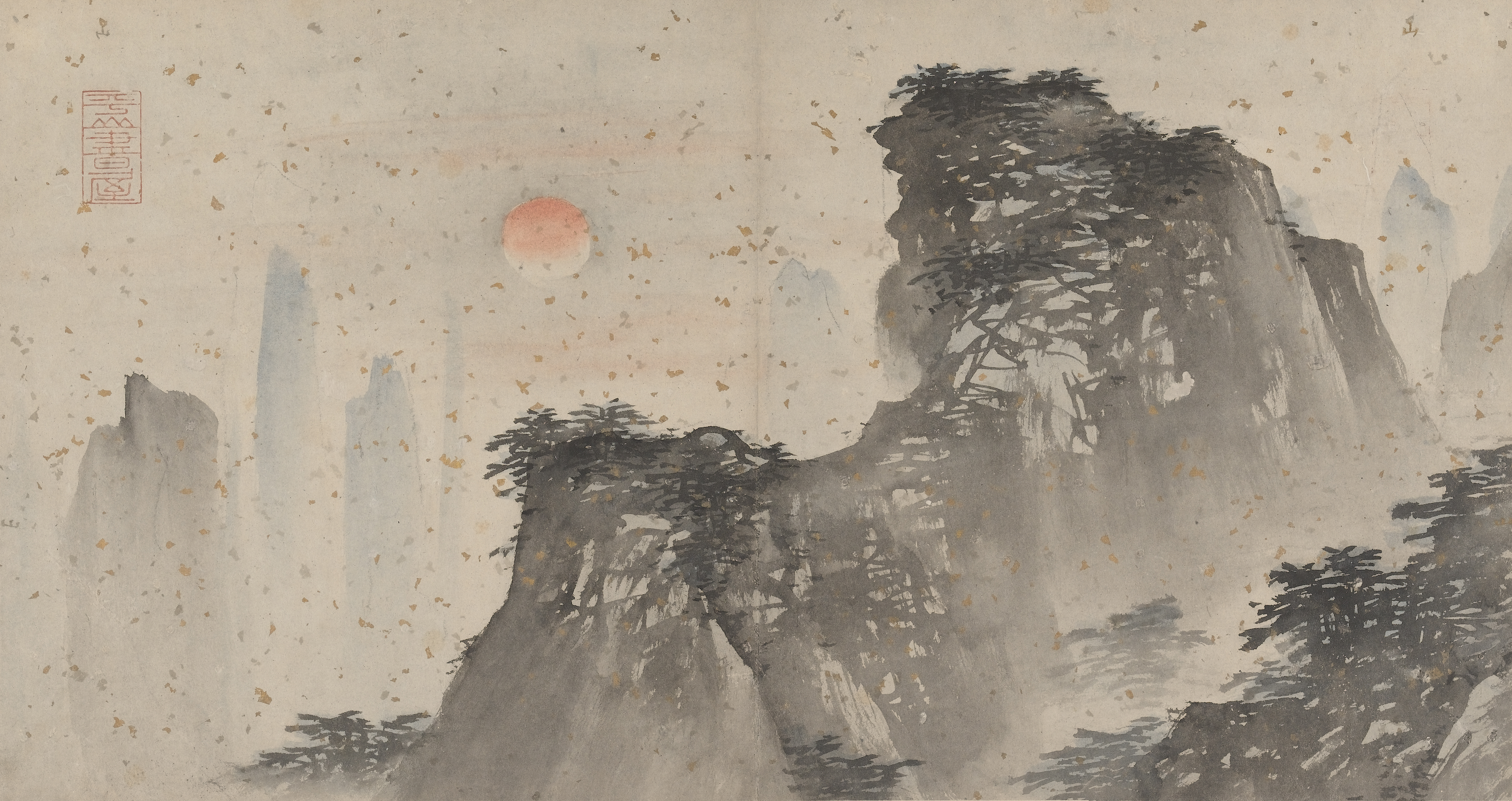
Mountains, from the Album of Eighteen Daoist Paintings, by Zhang Lu

Taoist art (also spelled as Daoist art) relates to the Taoist philosophy and narratives of Lao-tzu (also spelled as Laozi) that promote "living simply and honestly and in harmony with nature."

The artists were "Daoist masters, adepts, scholars-amateurs, and even emperors..." thus an eclectic group of art works were created over time that are as varied as their makers .

== Concept ==
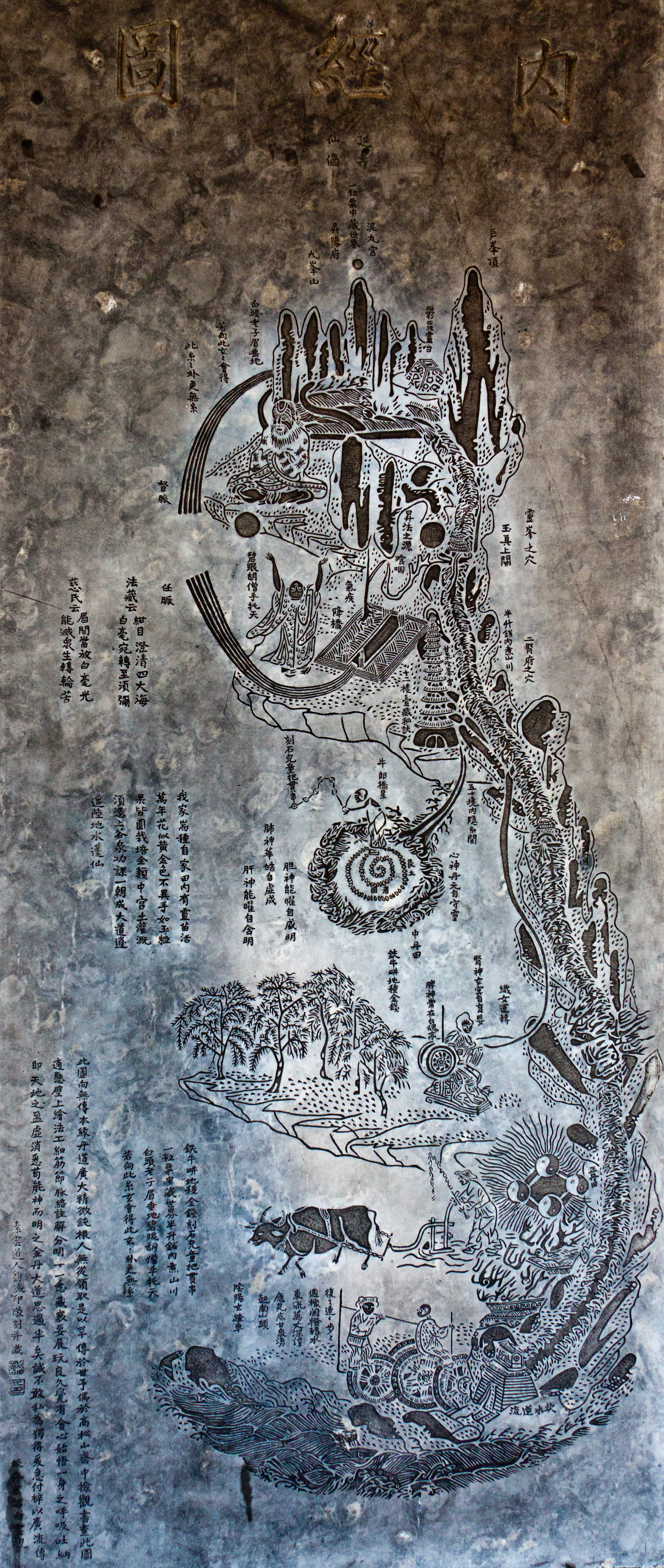
A "Neijingtu" (內經圖), a Daoist "inner landscape" diagram of the human body illustrating Neidan or "Internal alchemy", Wu Xing, Yin and Yang, and Chinese mythology.

The philosophy of Taoism traces back to the late Bronze Age and later developed into a set of religious practices. Currently Taoism is considered a "living religion, practised in mainland China, Taiwan, Hong Kong, and many overseas Chinese communities.”

An exhibition called Taoism and the Arts of China, presented at Art Institute of Chicago (2000) emphasized the art of the late Han to Qing dynasties and followed "the transformations of Taoism into an organized religion, the Taoist pantheon of gods who inhabit the stars and the heavens, modes of ritual and visualization, the cult of the immortals, and the role of landscape as a symbol of cosmic structure and process.”

Taoist landscape paintings often depict the virtues of the natural world as examples for man. In the Tao Te Ching (Daodejing), traditionally ascribed to Lao-Tzu, an older contemporary of Confucius, the author evokes the lessons that can be learned from trees in Book II, Chapter LXIV:

Deal with a thing while it is nothing;
Keep a thing in order before disorder sets in.
A tree that can fill the span of a man's arm
Grows from a downy tip;
A terrace nine storeys high
Rises from hodfuls of earth;
A journey of a thousand miles
Starts from beneath one's feet.

== Examples of Taoist art ==
=== The Dragon Pine ===
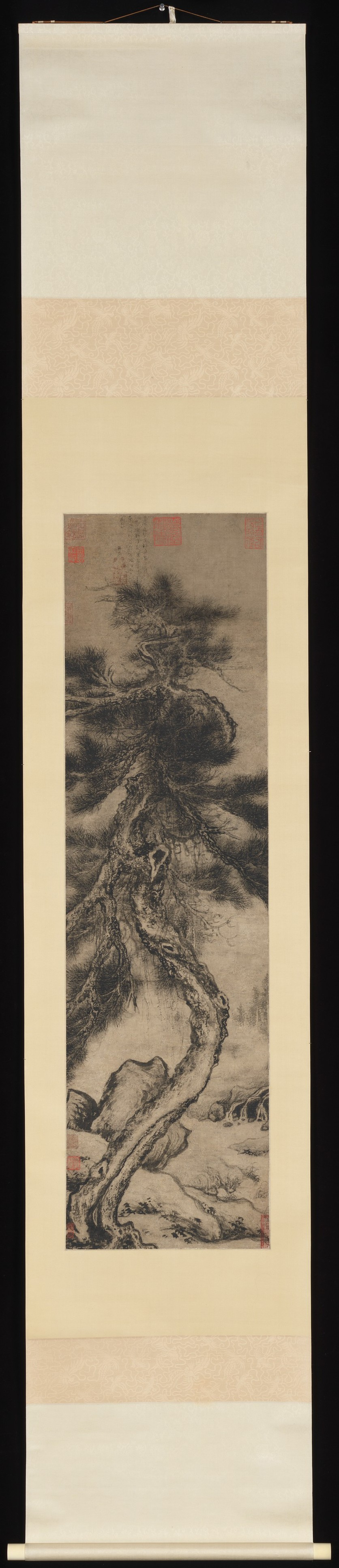
Wu Boli, Dragon Pine, circa 1400

This painting by the Taoist priest, Wu Boli (active late 14th-early 15th century), depicts an ancient pine tree, also called a dragon pine. Both dragon pine and pine exist as yang elements living near water, a yin element. As such, the dragon pine are symbols of longevity and of the Tao itself.

Lao Tzu suggested that trees such as the pine were suitable for lessons in wisdom and calm. The resolute pines in this painting may be seen as a case study in graceful endurance. They are buffeted by the elements, yet respond with the suppleness of their branches in order to survive. Their admixture of rigidity and suppleness allows pines to live long lives, adjusting themselves to each season. In order to strengthen their bodies, Taoists consumed pine needles, cones and resin.

=== Lü Dongbin crossing Lake Dongting ===
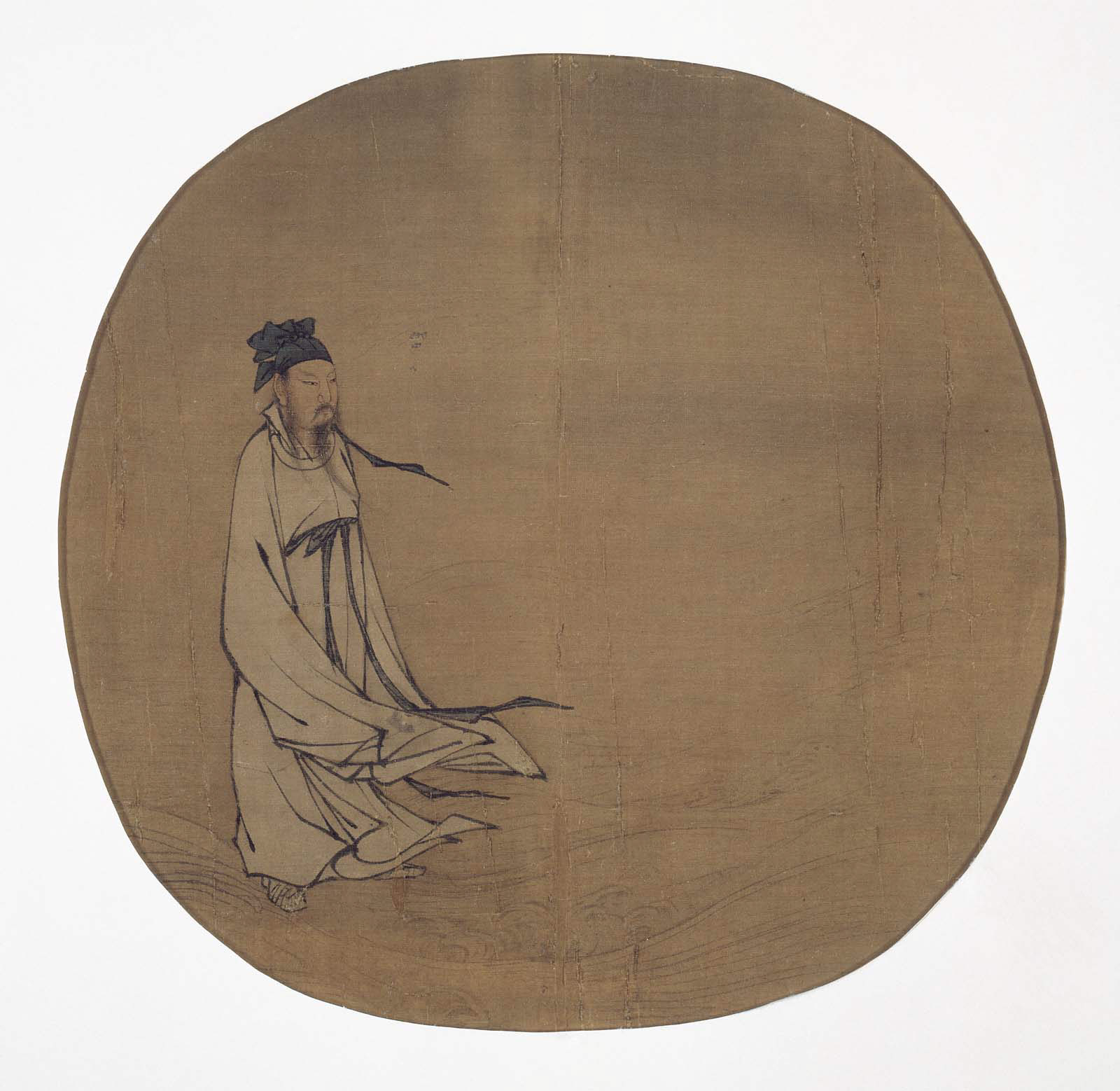
Daoist immortal Lü Dongbin Crossing Lake Dongting, Southern Song

This Southern Song (1127-1279) fan by an anonymous painter shows the Taoist immortal, Lü Dongbin, one of the famed Eight Immortals. Lü lived during the Tang dynasty (618-906). He was a specialist in Taoist meditative techniques and revered as a healer and exorcist as well as a diviner. He was a skilled swordsman, and his magic sword, named "Blue-Green Snake" is often depicted as a personal attribute in his depictions. As a scholar, he was celebrated for his poetry and calligraphy.

Lü Dongbin often appears in connection with Yueyang Pavilion, overlooking Lake Dongting in Hunan province. Lü often visited the site to drink wine, and it was here that he met spirits of both a pine and willow tree. Lü was one of the most famous and popular of all later Taoist immortals. Stephen Little suggests that he had enormous appeal among both literati and common people, cutting across social and economic boundaries.

=== Further examples ===
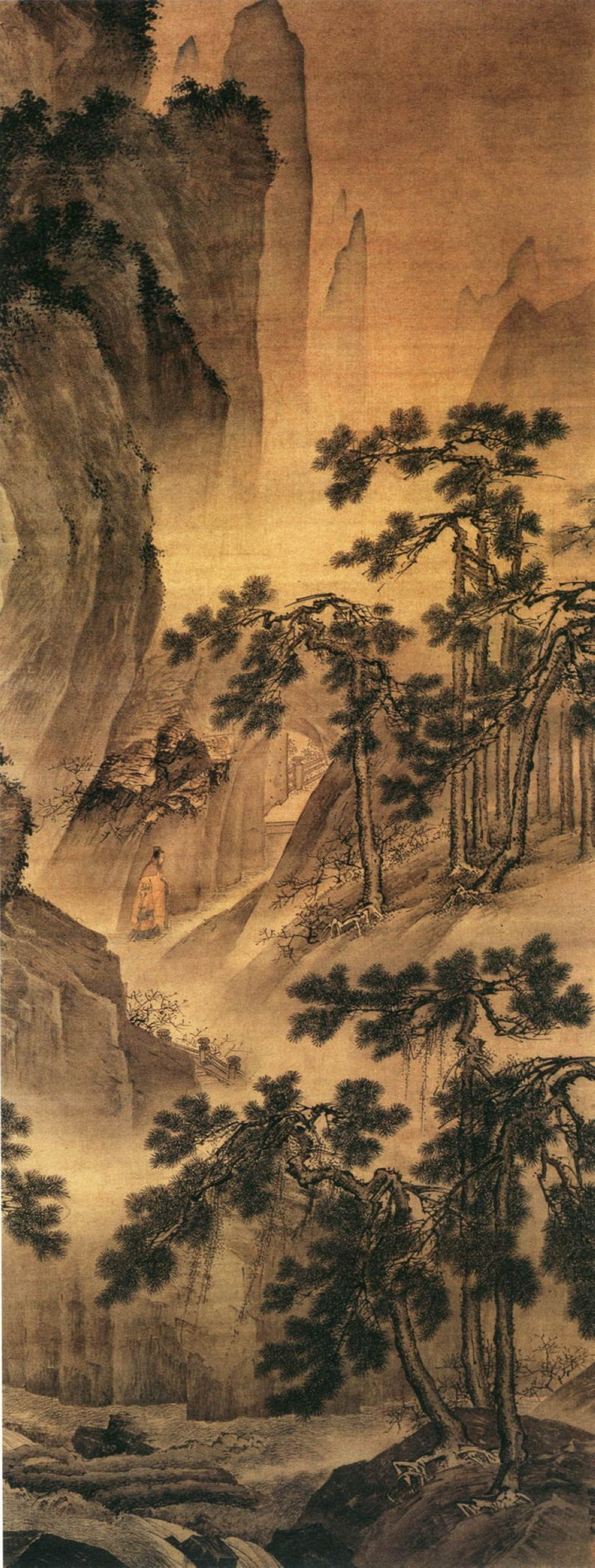
Inquiring of the Dao at the Cave of Paradise, hanging scroll, color on silk, 210.5 x 83 cm. Located at the Palace Museum, Beijing. This painting is based on the story that the Yellow Emperor went out to the Kongtong Mountains to meet with the famous Taoist sage Guangchengzi.

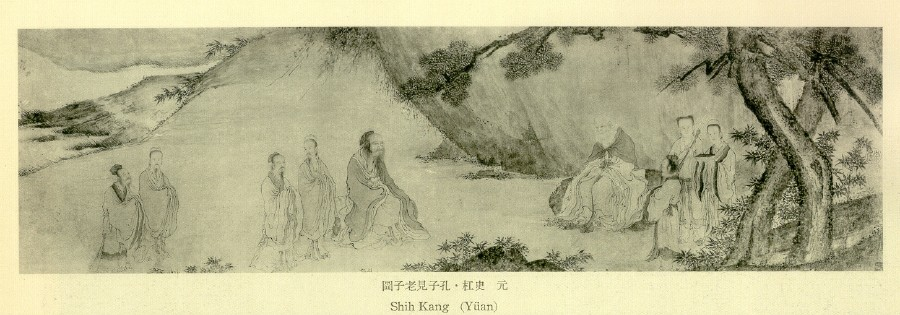
Confucius meets Laozi

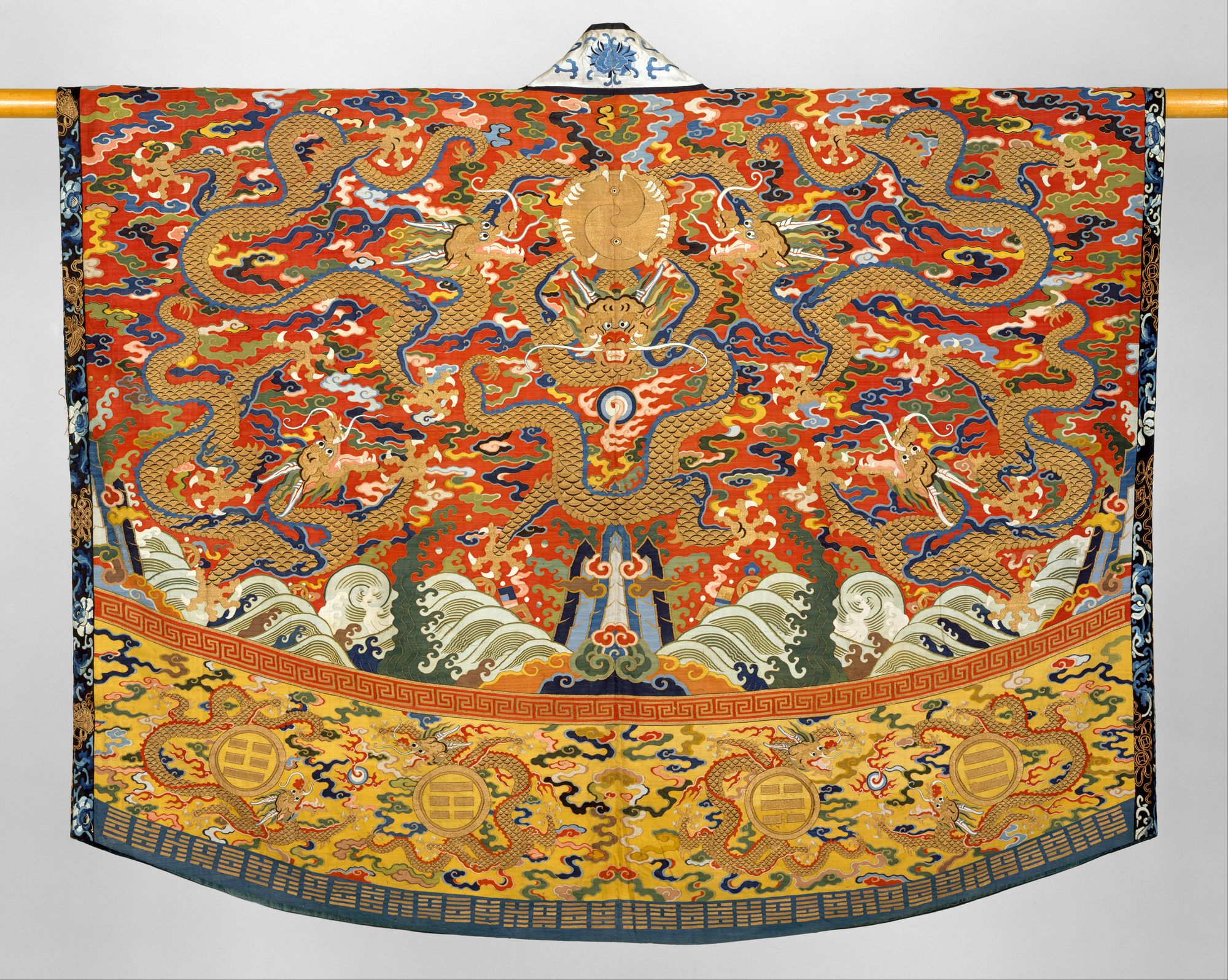
Daoist Robe, 17th Century
Robe embroidered with 5 dragons hovering over a landscape of mountains and ocean, likely worn by a Taoist priest during ceremonies.

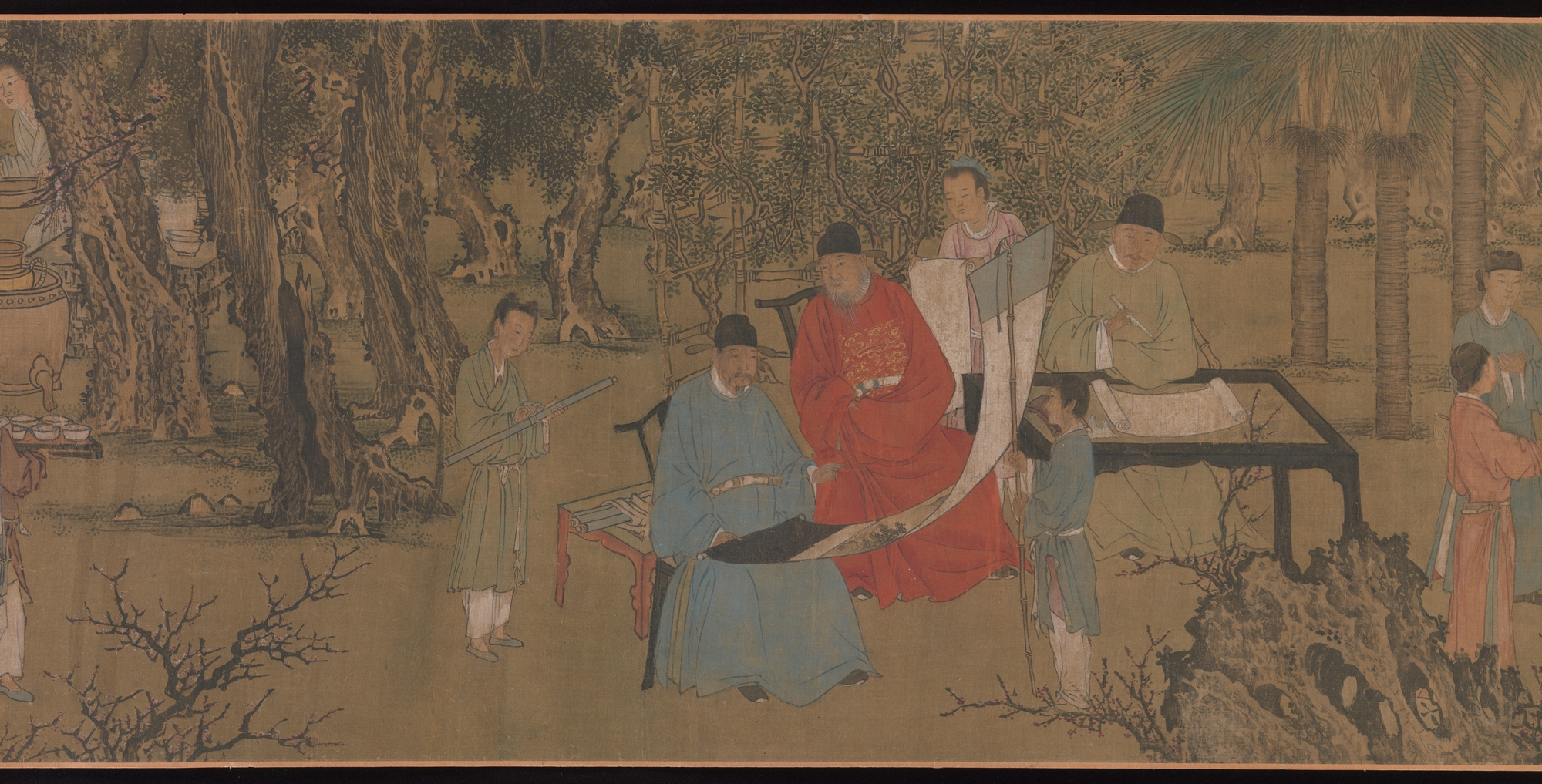
Elegant Gathering in the Apricot Garden

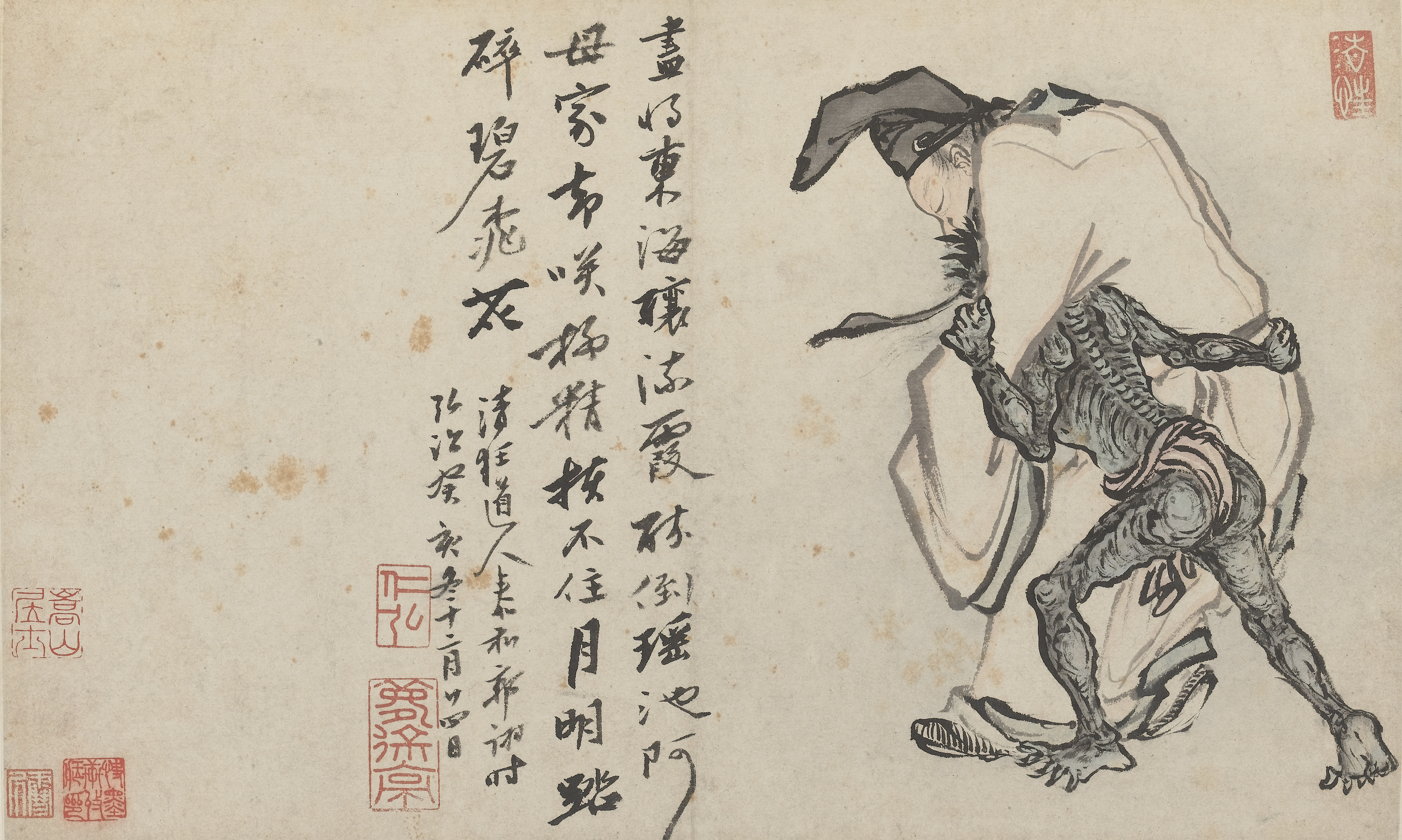
A drunken xian staggers home, supported by a demon.

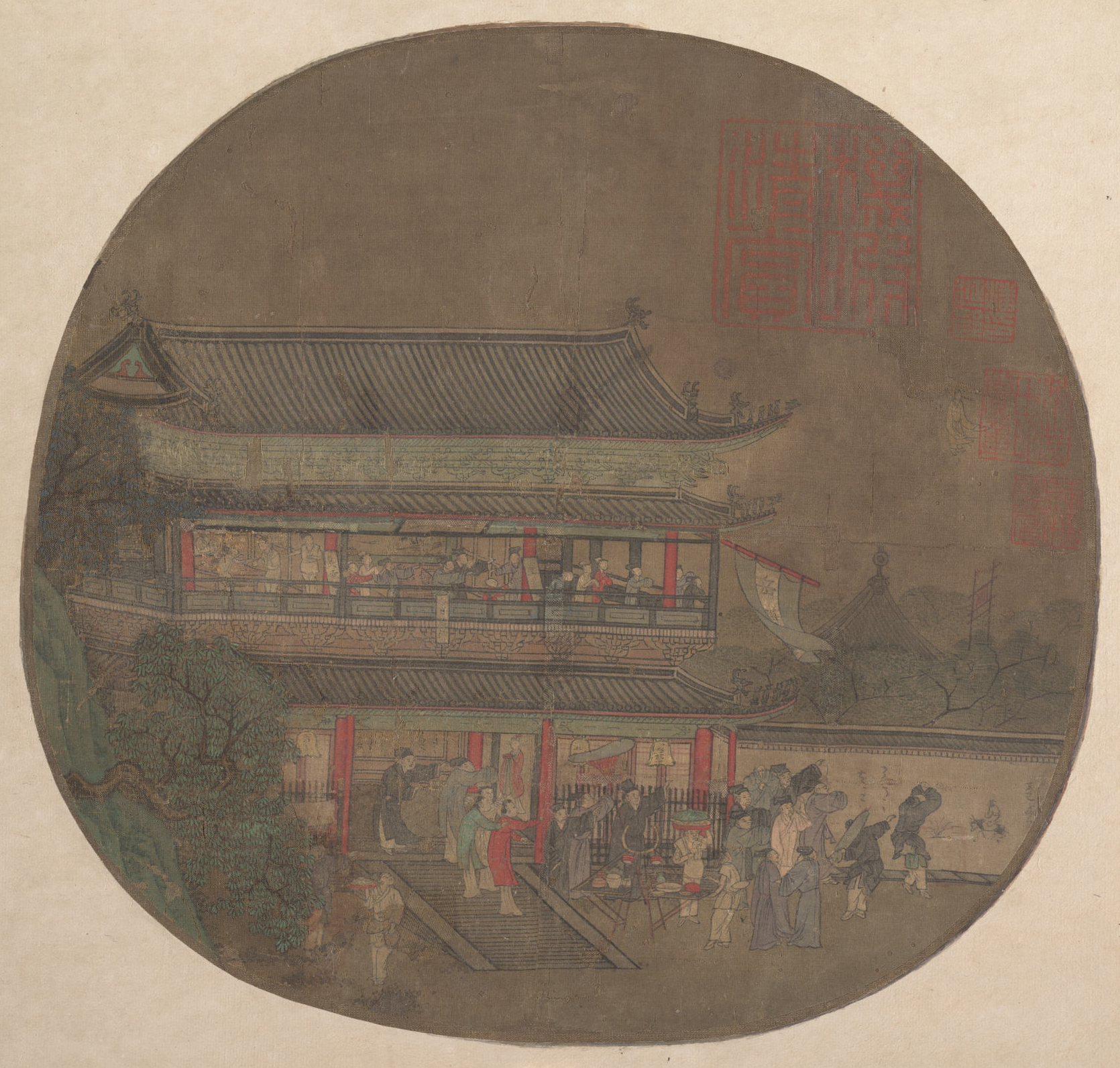
Song dynasty painting of Lü Dongbin appearing over the Yueyang Pavilion.

Queen Mother of the West from Yongle Temple murals, Yuan dynasty.

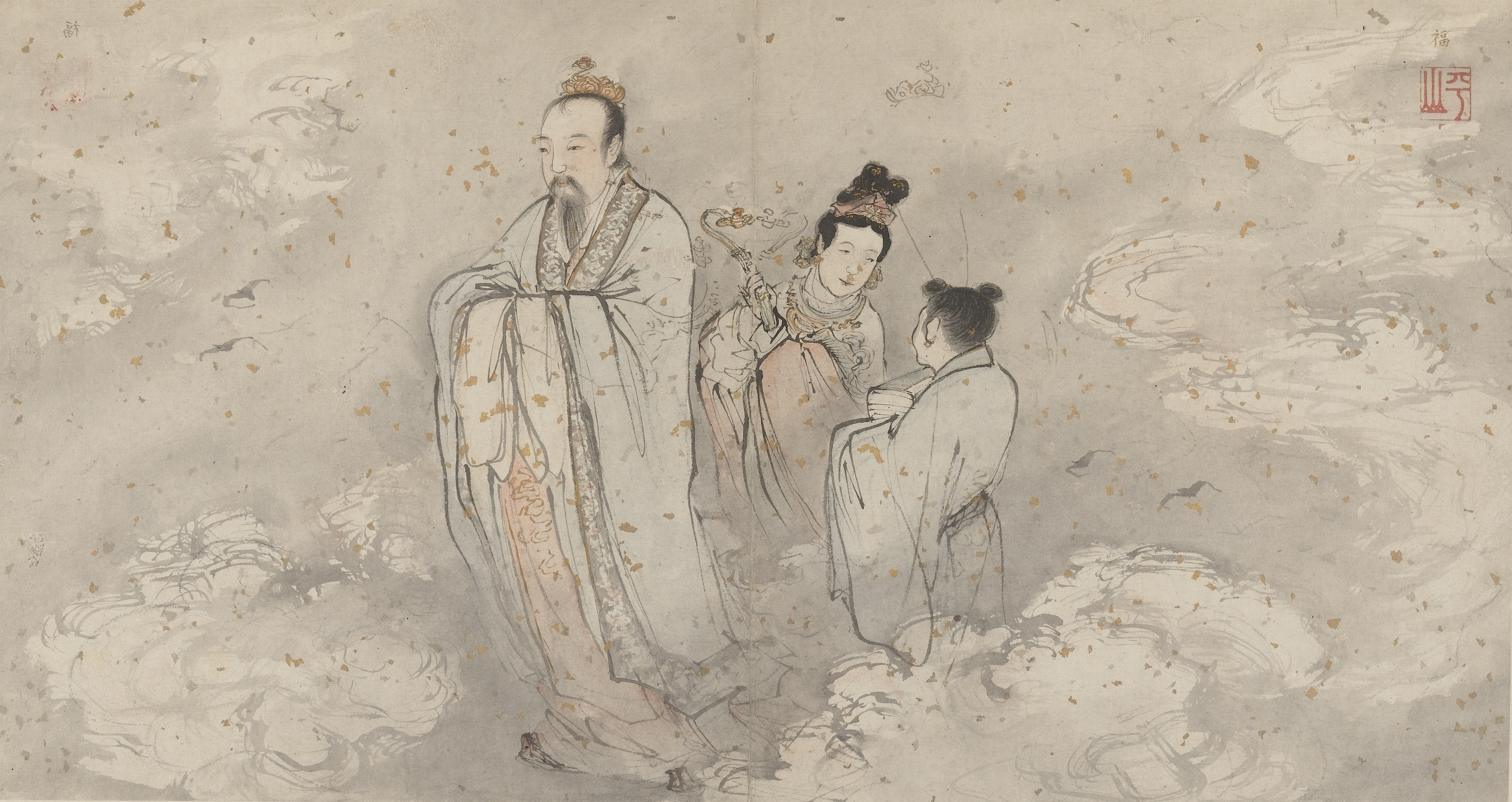
God of Good Fortune and his attendants, standing among the heavens, from the Album of Eighteen Daoist Paintings, by Zhang Lu.

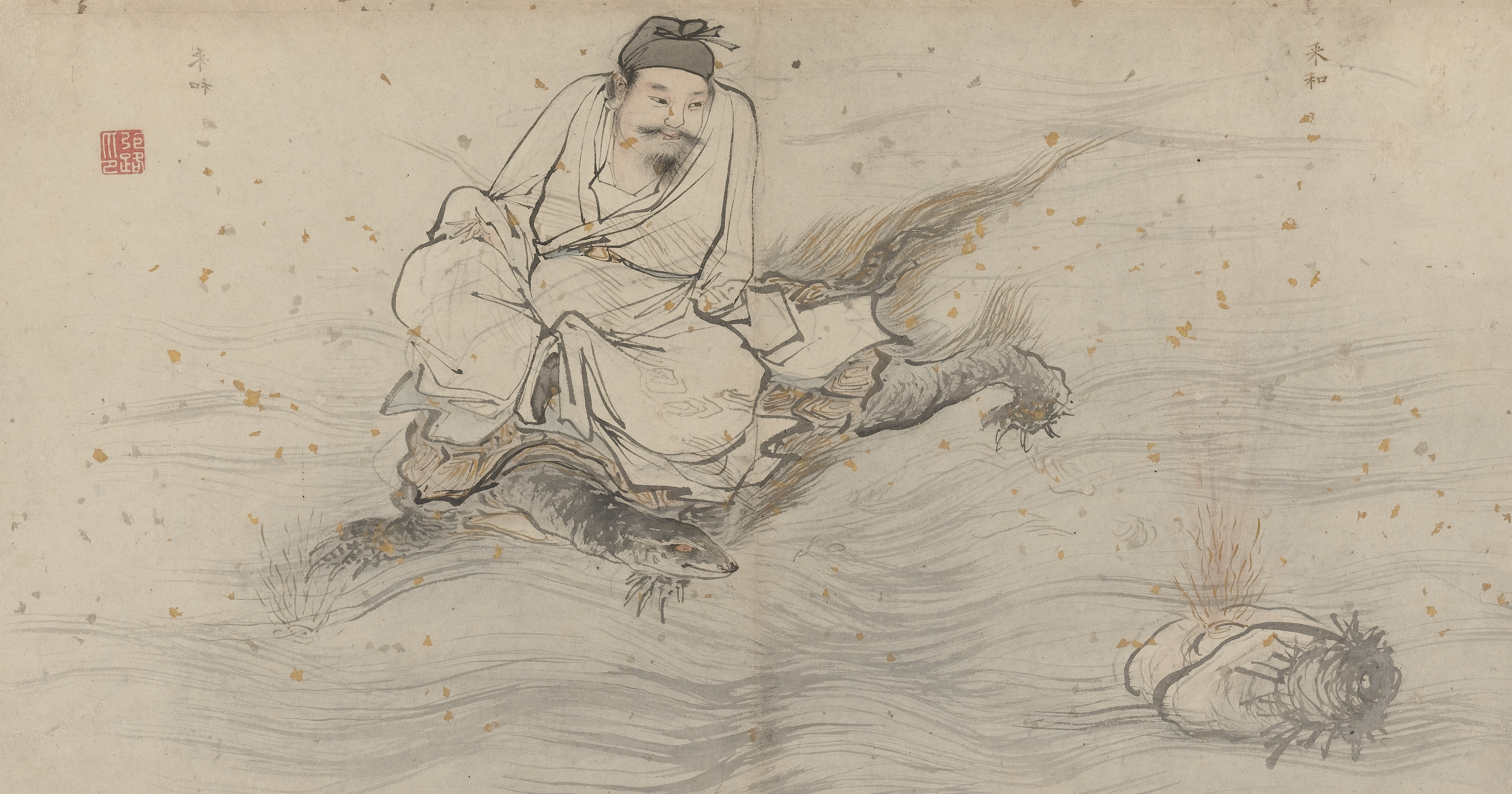
Lan Caihe of the Eight Immortals, from the Album of Eighteen Daoist Paintings, by Zhang Lu.

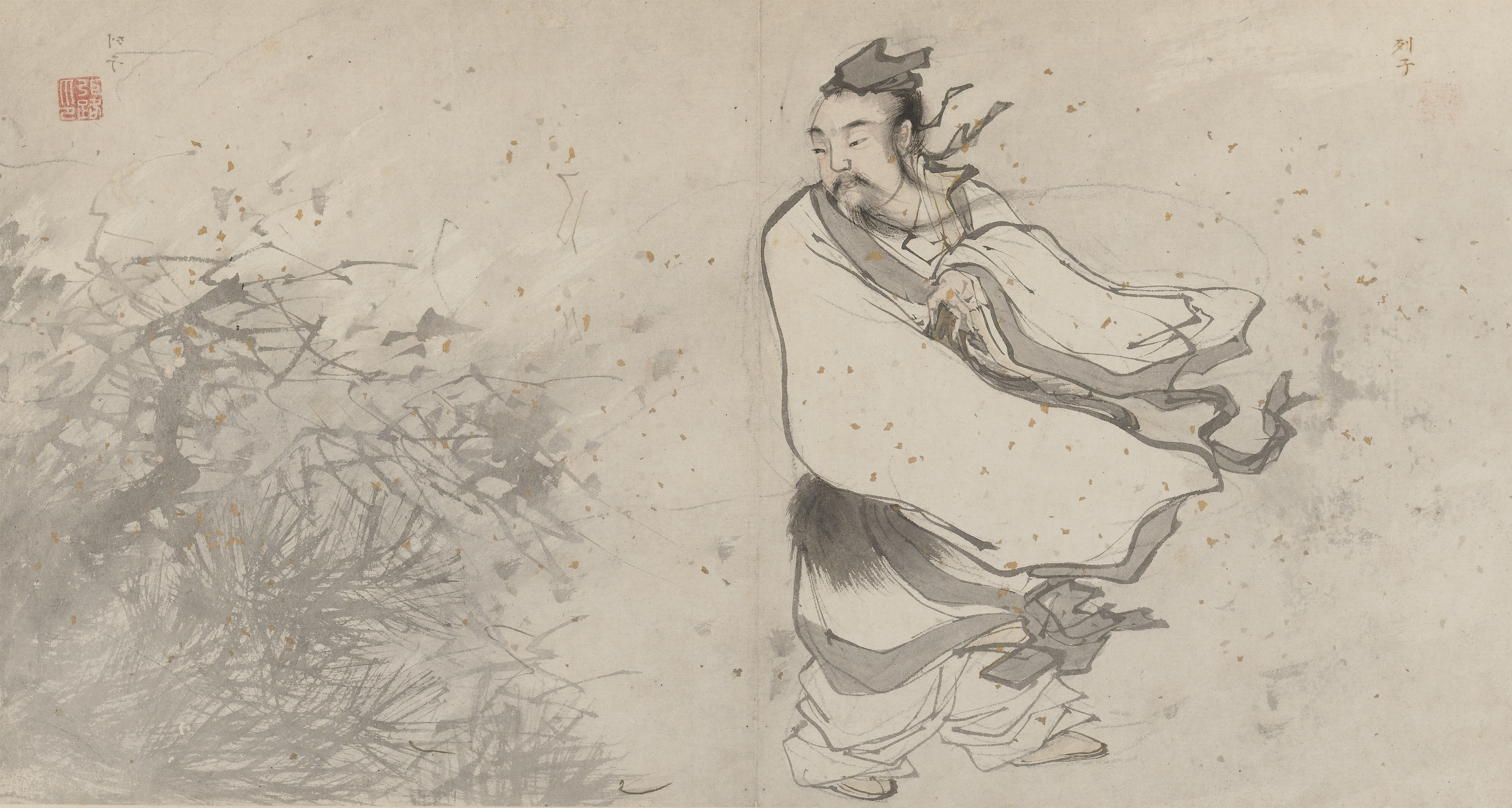
Daoist philosopher Liezi, from the Album of Eighteen Daoist Paintings, by Zhang Lu.

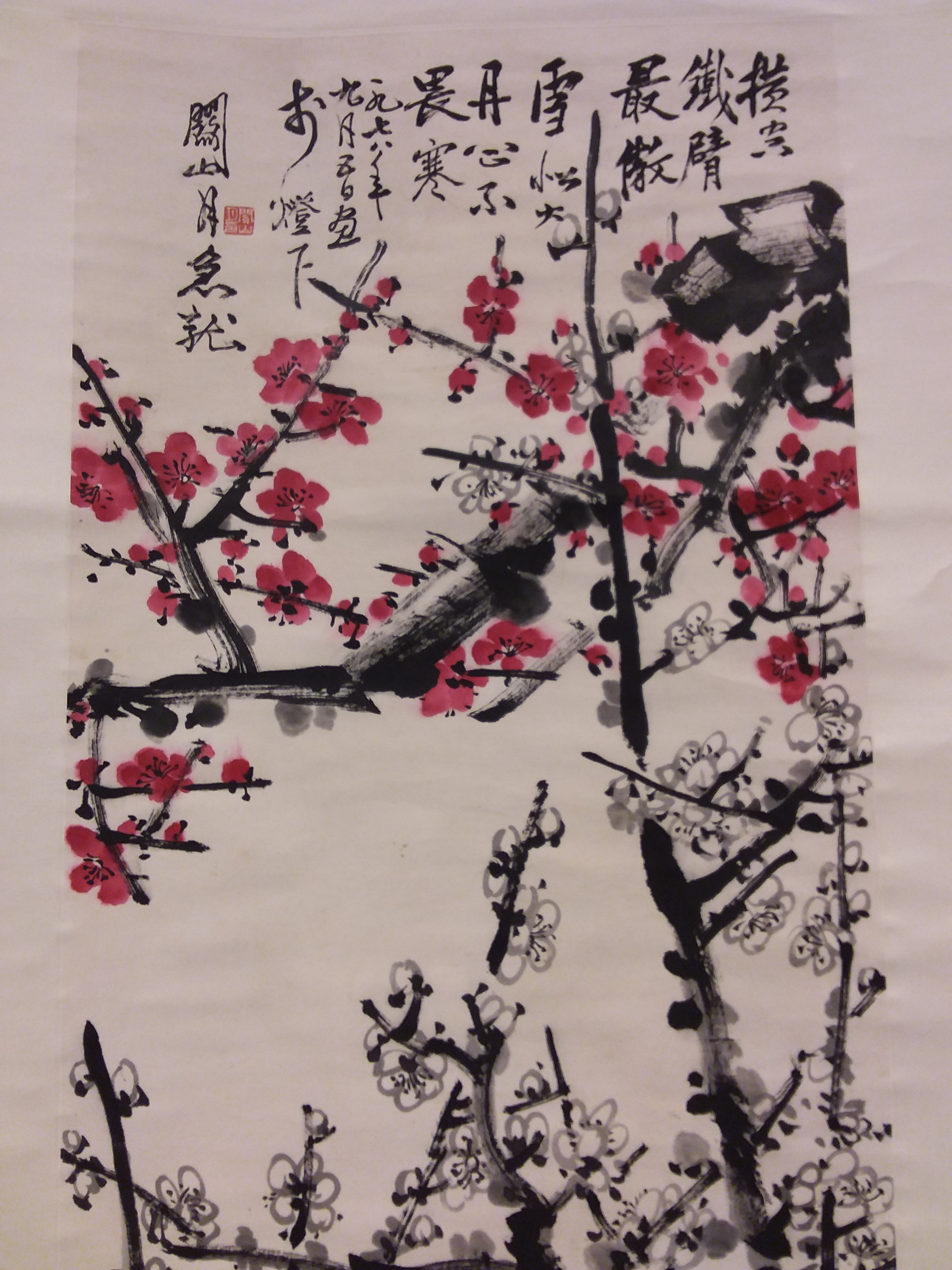
Painting of plum blossoms from Hong Kong Library Taoist culture exhibition, 2019.
