= Jonway Wuxing =

Chinese microvan

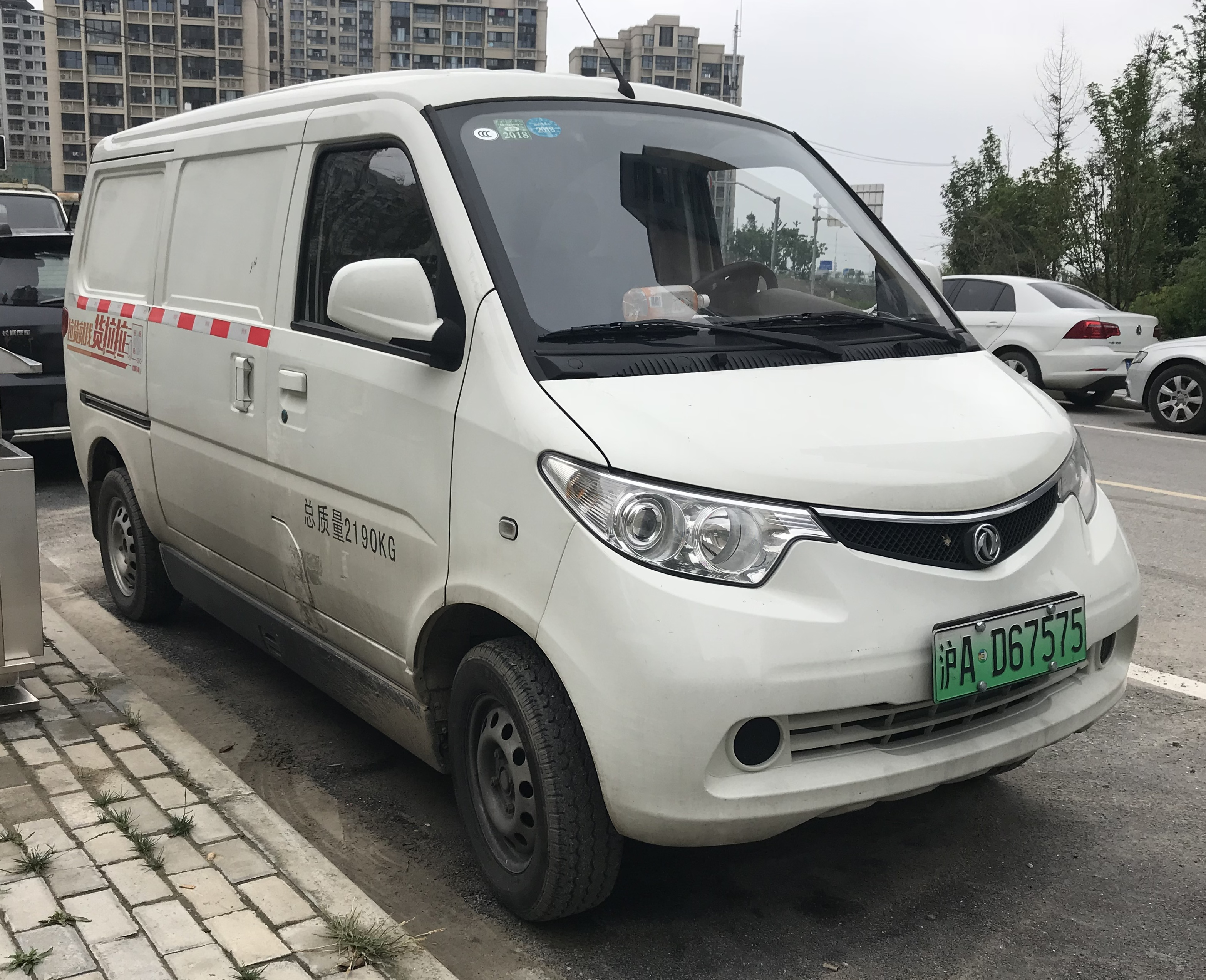

Overview
- Manufacturer: Jonway Automobile
- Also called: Skio Junfeng (rebadged electric version)
- Production: 2012–present
- Assembly: China: Taizhou, Zhejiang

Body and chassis
- Body style: 5-door minivan
- Layout: Mid engine, rear-wheel drive

Powertrain
- Engine: 1.1 L I4
- Transmission: 5-speed manual

Dimensions
- Wheelbase: 2,705 mm (106.5 in)
- Length: 4,178 mm (164.5 in)
- Width: 1,630 mm (64.2 in)
- Height: 1,898 mm (74.7 in)

The Jonway Wuxing (五星) is a microvan produced by Jonway Automobile.

== Overview ==
The Jonway Wuxing was originally launched in September 2012. Later in May 2013. The Wuxing is Jonway Automobile's first entry into the Chinese micro van market, and Wuxing in Chinese means Five Star.

Jonway Automobile plans to launch the model in America as the Shuttle G, and an additional electric version would also be launched as the Shuttle EV.

=== Powertrain ===
The Jonway Wuxing is powered by a Mitsubishi Motors 4A10 Series 1.1 liter engine producing 69 horsepower and 89 N·m mated to a 5-speed manual gearbox. As of 2013, prices of the Dongfeng Junfeng ranges from 37,800 to 42,800 yuan.

== Skio Junfeng (Jonway Wuxing based) ==
Dongfeng produces a rebadged electric logistics version called the Skio Junfeng (东风时空俊风) sold under the Skio (时空) NEV sub-brand. Despite the Junfeng name, the electric panel van is based on the Jonway Wuxing (永源五星) microvan instead of the Dongfeng Junfeng microvan, and was developed by Dongfeng in a joint venture with Zhejiang Jonway and rebadged based on the Jonway Wuxing (永源五星) microvan. Dongfeng has teamed up with Zhejiang Skio Matrix (Shikong) and Zap Jonway to market a panel van version of the Jonway Wuxing as the new Junfeng. Skio Matrix is an electric vehicle conversion specialist and supplier of battery packs which also markets electric vehicles on behalf of Dongfeng (U-Vane EV), Zhidou, and Kandi.

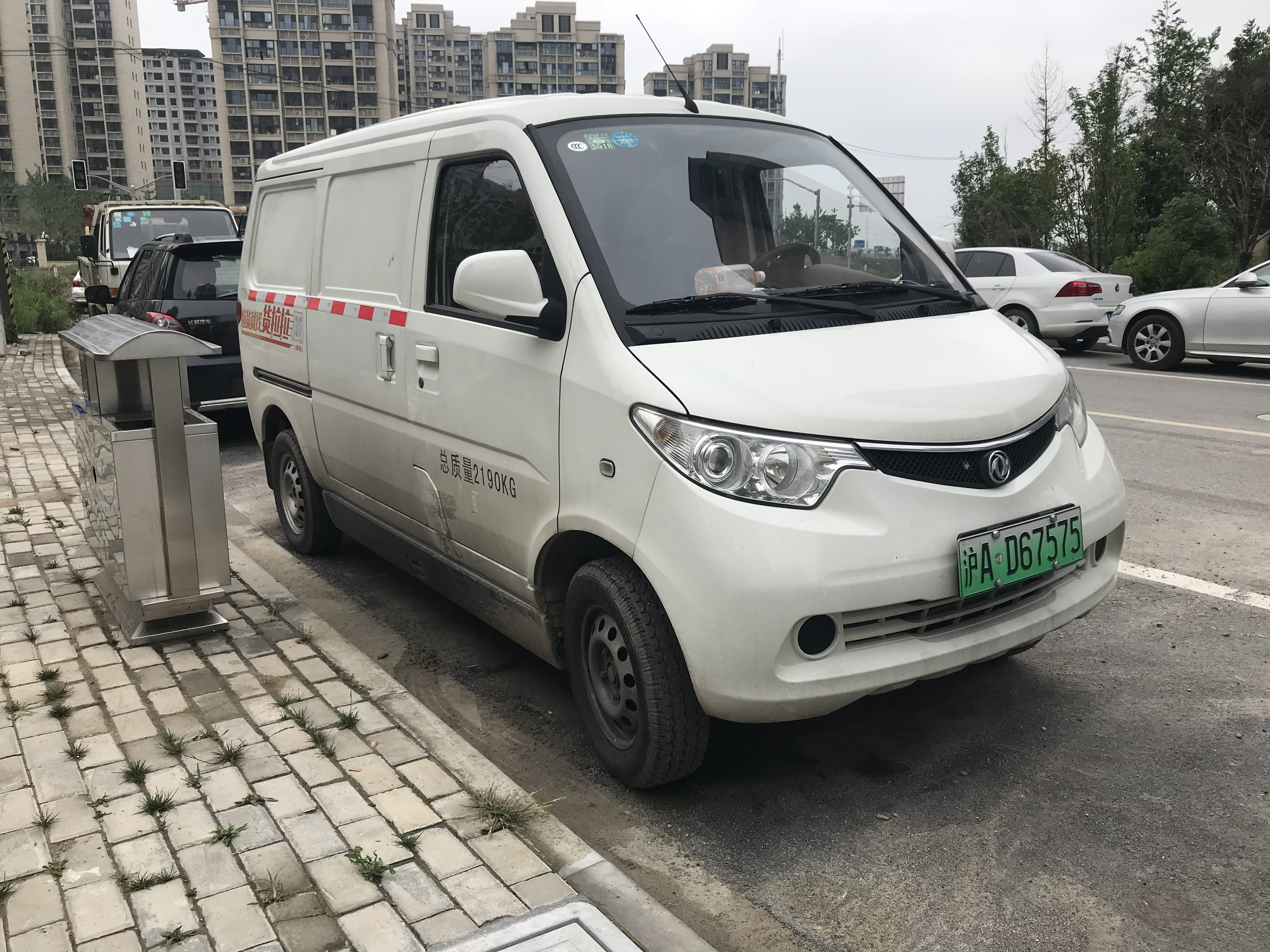
Skio Junfeng front

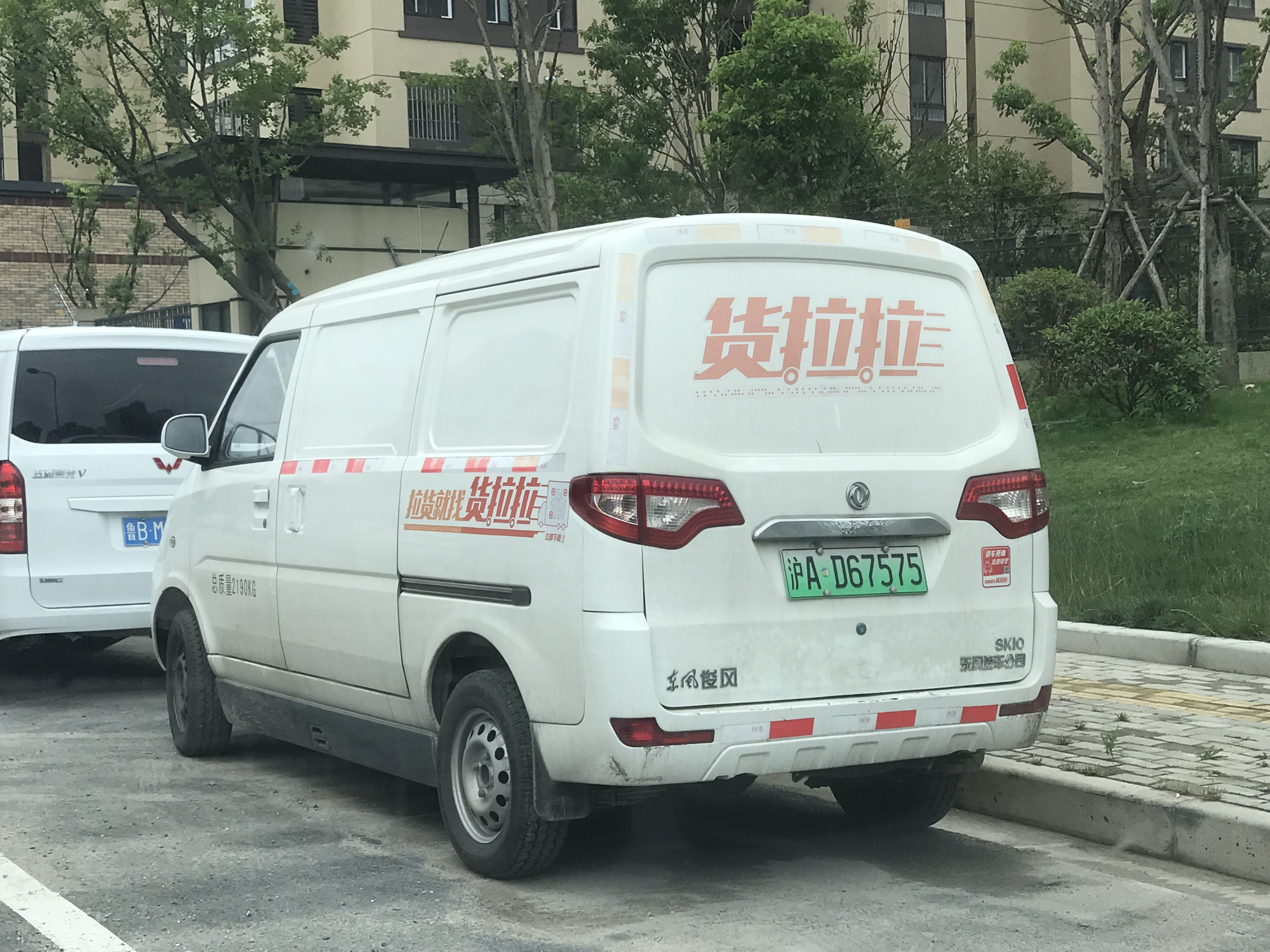
Skio Junfeng rear

== Zhejiang-Hongyuan Paipai (Zhejiang-Baoqi Jinqi) ==
Another rebadged electric logistics version called the Zhejiang-Hongyuan Paipai (浙江-泓源派派) was sold by Zhejiang-Baoqi Jinqi (浙江-宝骐劲骐) from 2015.

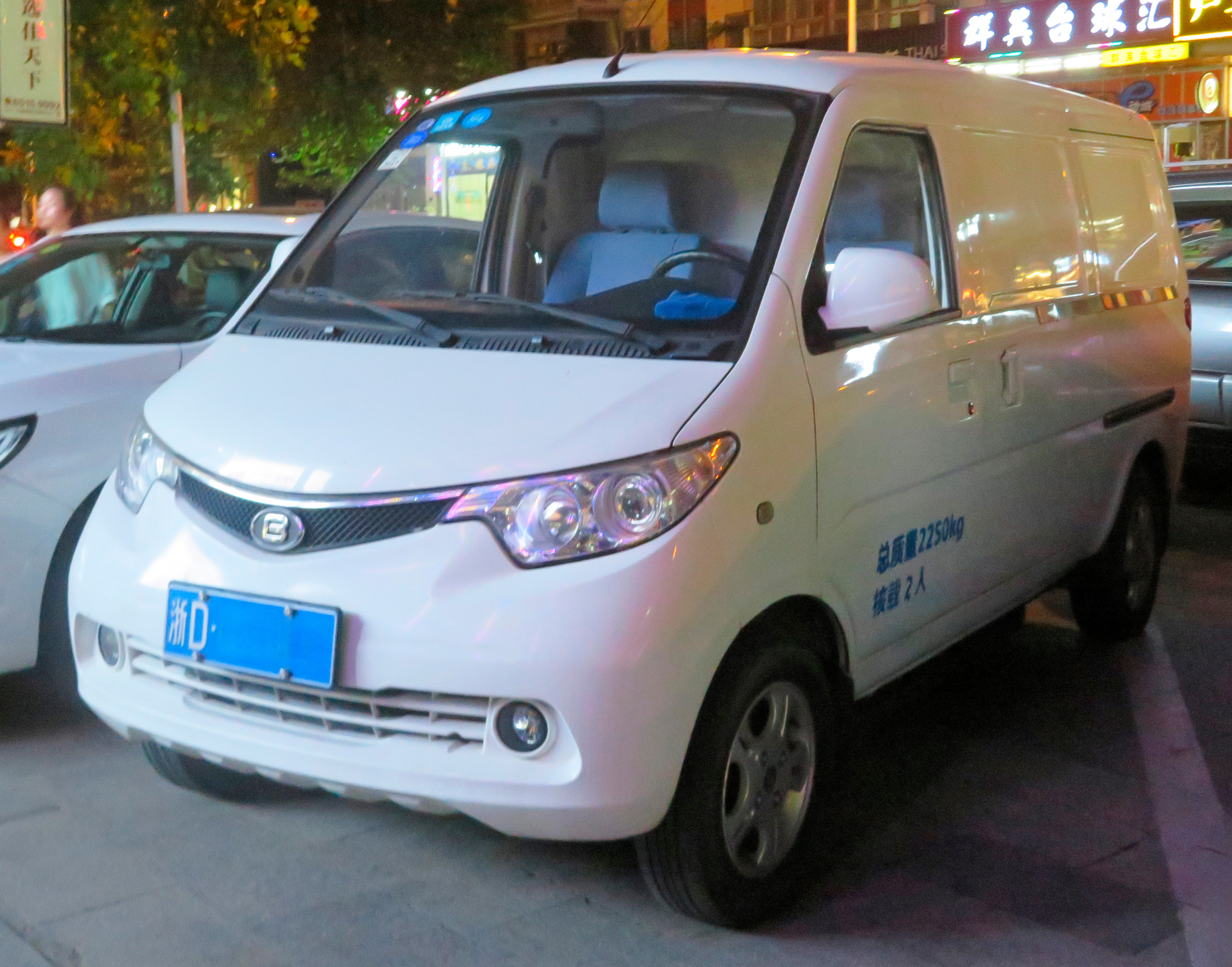
Zhejiang-Hongyuan Paipai

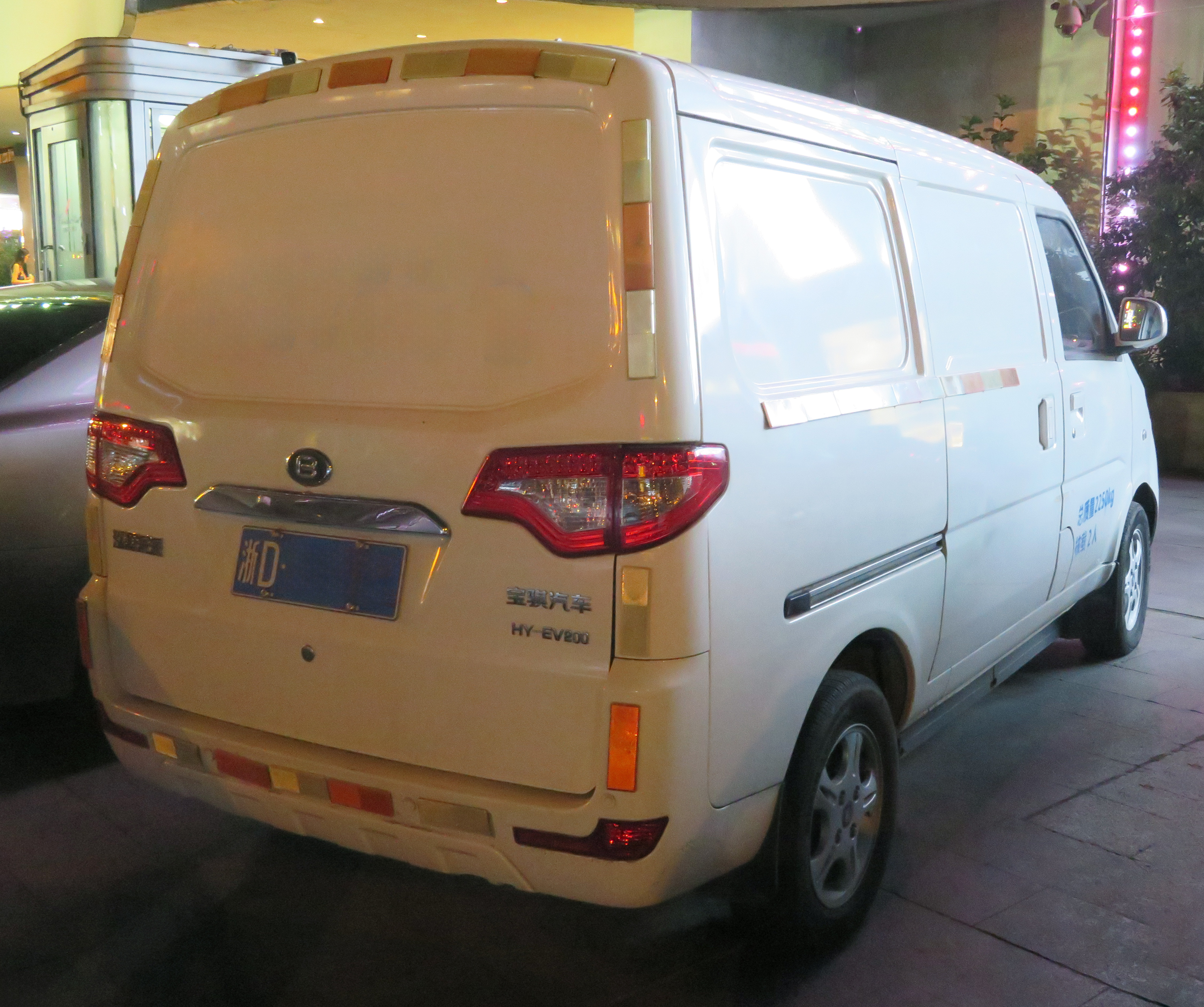
Rear
