= Wuxing =

Wuxing may refer to:

== Places in China ==
=== Counties and districts ===
- Huzhou, formerly Wuxing County, Zhejiang, China
- Wuxing District (吴兴区), central district of Huzhou

=== Subdistricts (五星街道) ===
- Wuxing Subdistrict, Mudanjiang, in Dong'an District, Mudanjiang, Heilongjiang
- Wuxing Subdistrict, Xinyang, in Shihe District, Xinyang, Henan
- Wuxing subdistrict, Xi'an, in Chang'an District, Xi'an, Shaanxi
- Wuxing, Jiangsu, in Zhonglou District, Changzhou, Jiangsu
- Wuxing, Yancheng, Jiangsu, in Tinghu District, Yancheng, Jiangsu

=== Towns (五星镇) ===
- Wuxing, Anhui, in Taihe County, Anhui
- Wuxing, Xinye County, in Xinye County, Henan

=== Townships (五星乡) ===
- Wuxing Township, Anhui, in Xuanzhou District, Xuancheng, Anhui
- Wuxing Township, Henan, in Puyang County, Henan
- Wuxing, Sichuan, a township in Xingwen County, Yibin, Sichuan
- Wuxing, Yunnan, in Huize County, Yunnan

== Other ==
- Wuxing (Chinese philosophy) (五行), a concept in Chinese philosophy
- Wuxing (text) (五行), a Chinese "Warring States" text
- Wuxing (c. 630) Chinese monk who travelled to India and mentioned by Yijing, died in Northern India.
- Jonway Wuxing, a Chinese microvan

== See also ==
- Flag of China, or the "Five-starred red flag" (五星红旗)
- Five star (disambiguation), or Wuxing (五星)
