= Jonway A380 =

Chinese compact crossover SUV

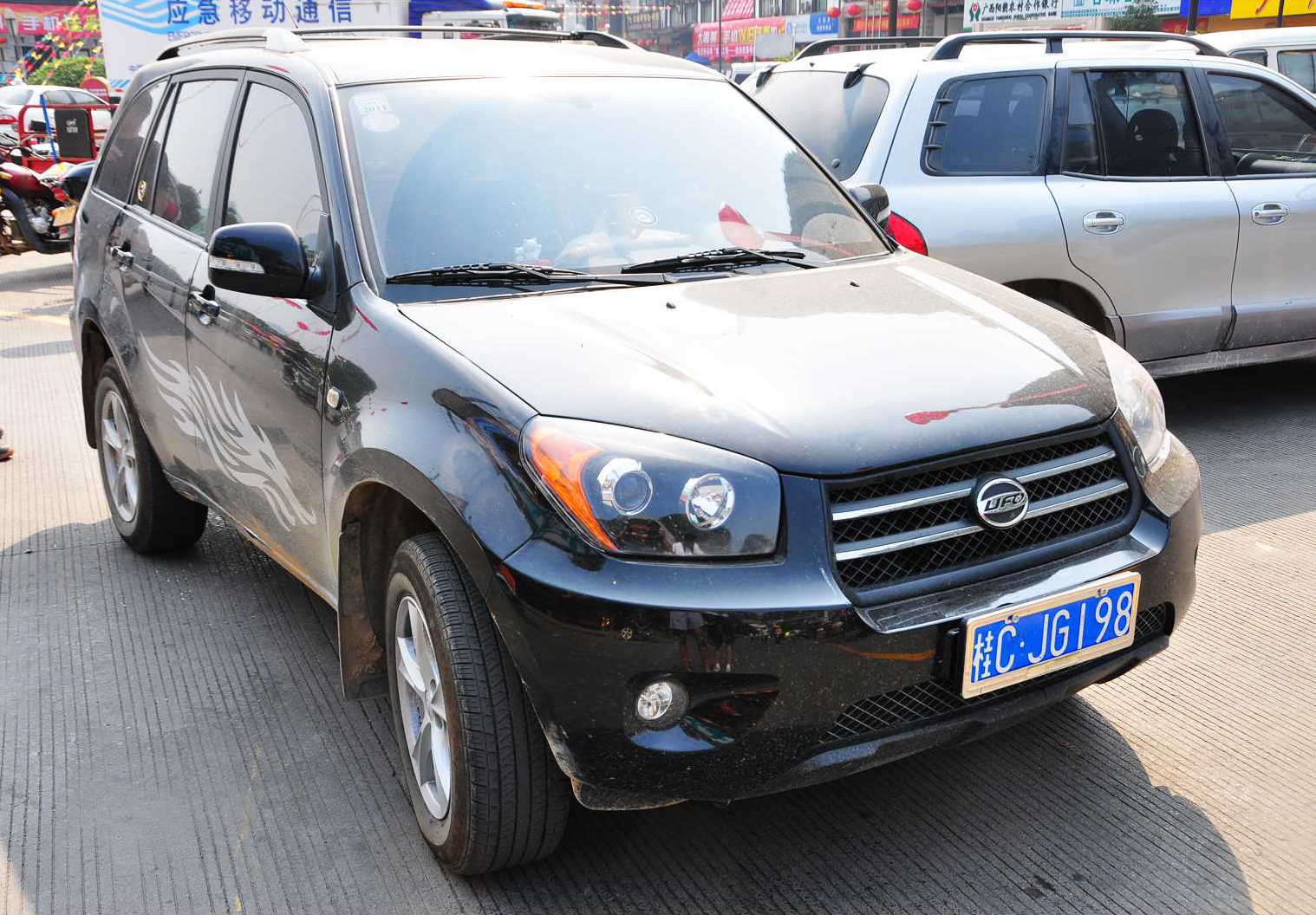

Overview
- Also called: Jonway UFO; Jonway UFO A380; Jonway Falcon
- Production: 2005–2015
- Model years: 2006–2015

Body and chassis
- Class: Compact crossover SUV

The Jonway A380 is a compact crossover SUV produced by the Chinese automobile manufacturer Jonway Automobile priced at 67,900 yuan.

== Styling controversy ==
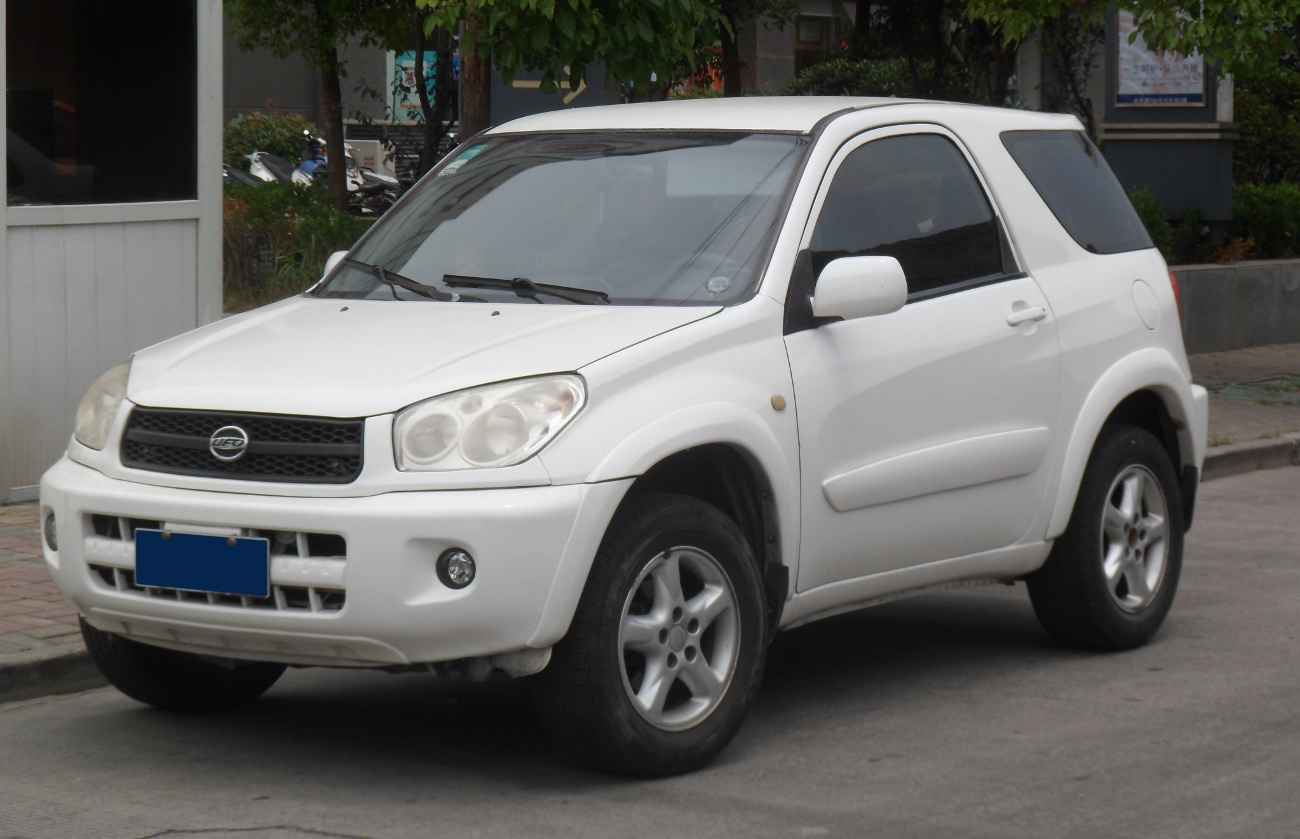
Jonway UFO A380 3-door pre facelift front

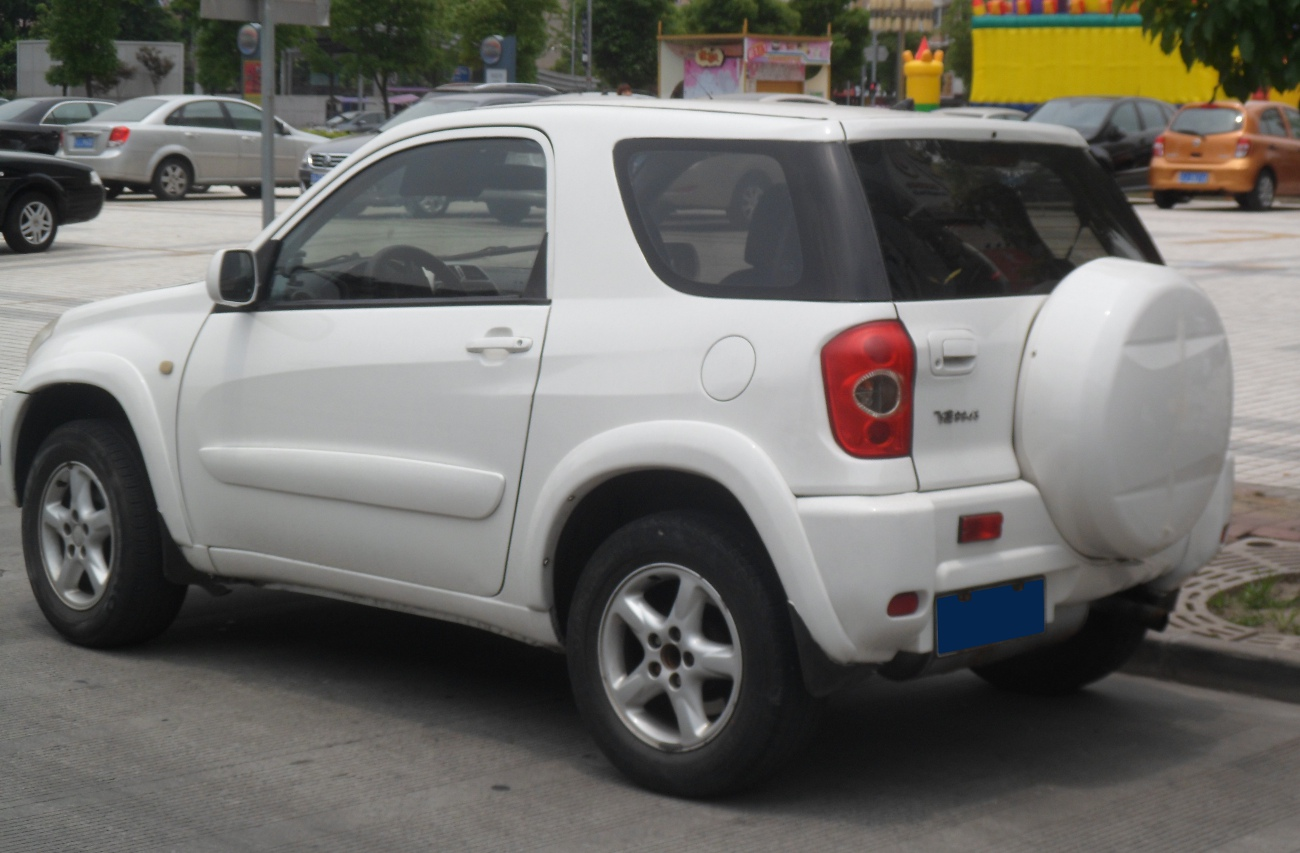
Jonway UFO A380 3-door pre facelift rear

The styling of the Jonway A380 has been controversial, with its exterior styling receiving media exposure as it appears to have been reverse-engineered from the second generation Toyota RAV4 (XA20) without a license. The Jonway A380 proposed in both three-door short wheelbase and five-door long wheelbase are all considered copies of the Toyota crossover.

== Specifications ==
Model	Jonway UFO 1.6	Jonway UFO 1.8	Jonway UFO 2.0	Jonway UFO 2.4
Engine	4G18S (EU) and (CN)	4G93D (CN)	4G63S4M (EU) and (CN)	4G64S4M (CN)
Displacement (cc)	1,584	1,834	1,997	2,351
Drive variant	2WD	2WD	2WD	2WD
Transmission	5-speed manual or 4-speed automatic	5-speed manual	5-speed manual or 4-speed automatic	5-speed manual
Cylinder	4	4	4	4
Valves	16	16	16	16
Performance (kW)	74	103	95	95
Top speed (km/h)	175	175	175	175
Fuel	Gasoline	Diesel	Gasoline	Gasoline
Length (mm)	3,850	3,850	3,850	3,850
Width (mm)	1,750	1,785	1,785	1,785
Height (mm)	1,665	1,665	1,665	1,665
Turning circle (m)	5	5	5	5
Trunk volume (L)	150 (Seats folded down: 766)	150 (Seats folded down: 766)	150 (Seats folded down: 766)	150 (Seats folded down: 766)
Tare (kg)	1,180	1,180	1,365	1,365
Total weight (kg)	1,505	1,505	1,690	1,690
Tyres	215/65R16	215/65R16	235/60R16	235/60R16
Emission standard	Euro 4	Euro III	Euro 4	Euro III

== 2013 facelift ==
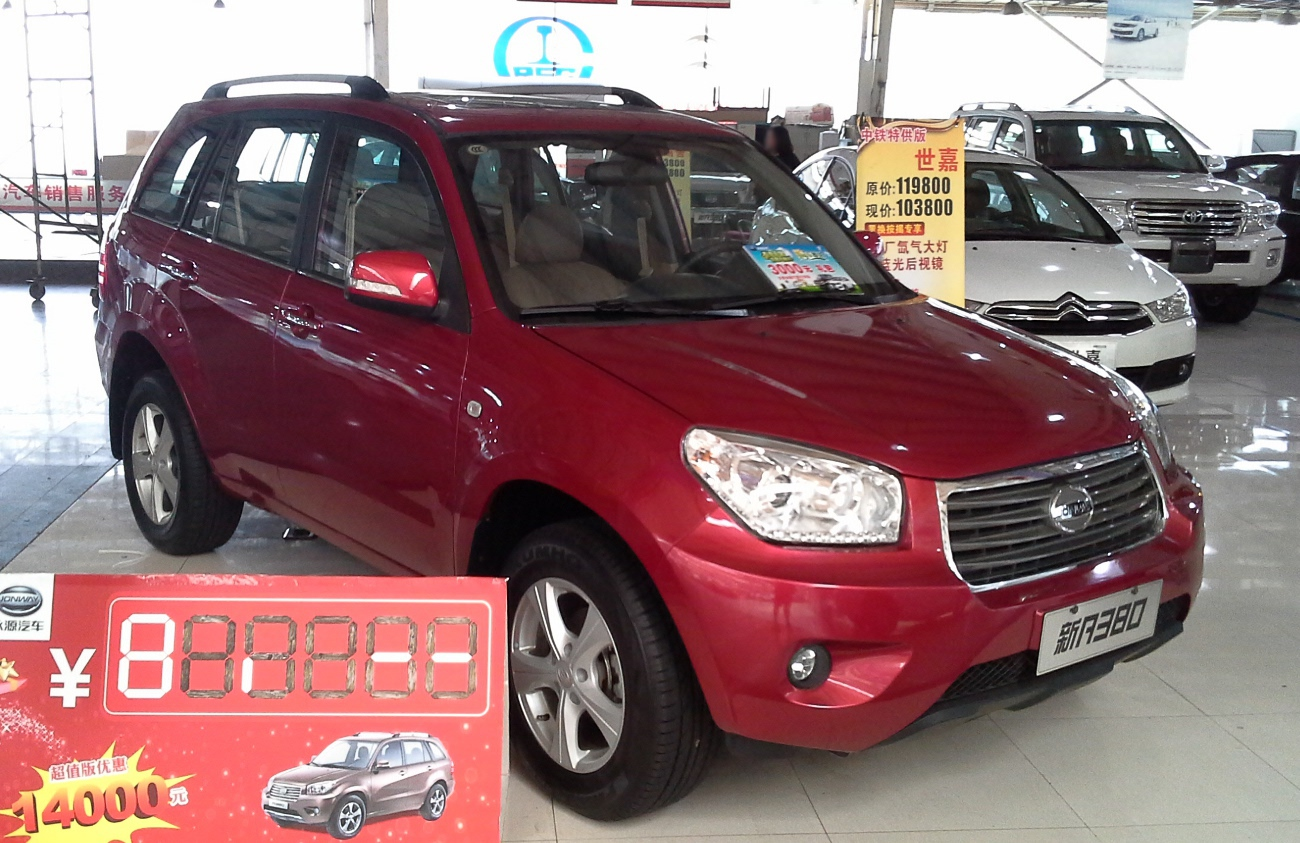
Jonway UFO A380 5-door facelift front

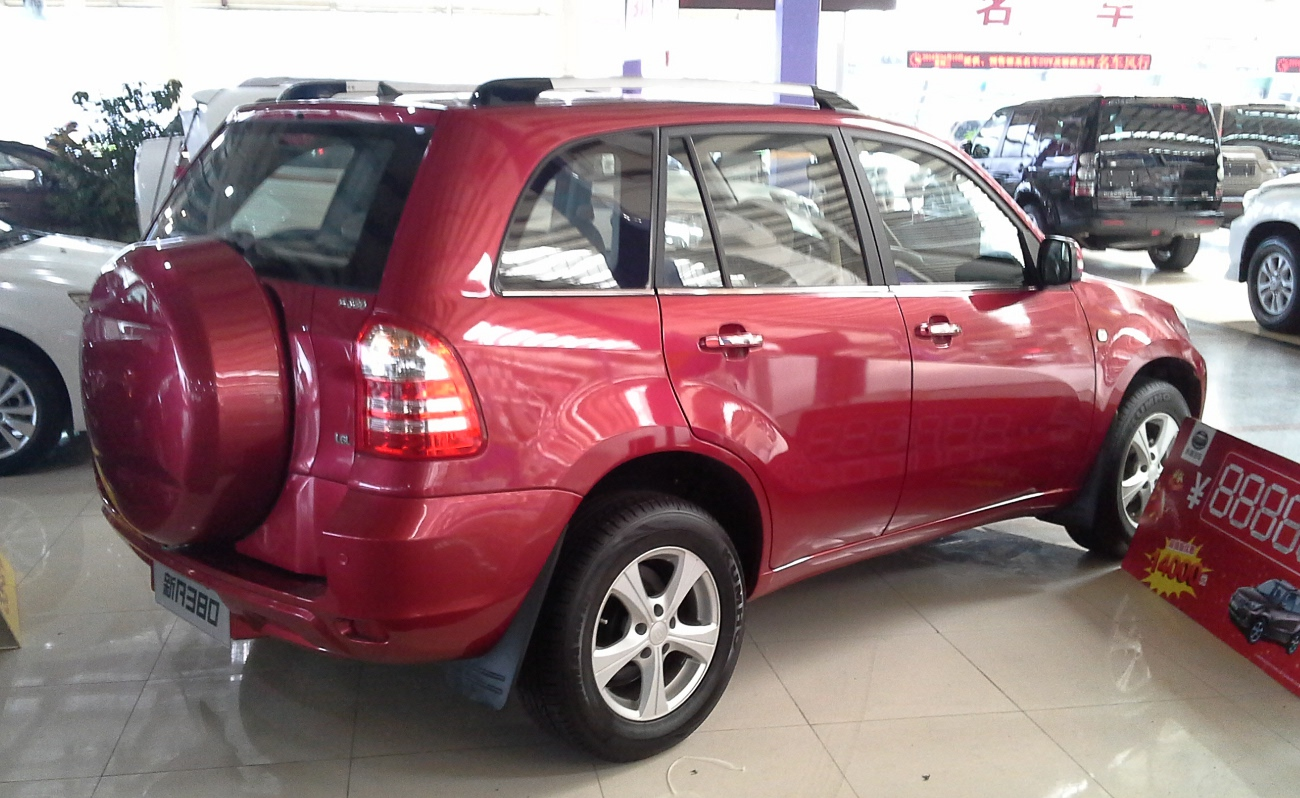
Jonway UFO A380 5-door facelift rear

In 2012 Jonway Automobile signed an agreement with Maggiora the coachbuilder to conduct a facelift for the Jonway UFO A380. The model exhibited at the concept car stadium only went into production at the end of 2013.

== Jonway Falcon ==
In 2013 Jonway Automobile presented a second crossover named Jonway Falcon. The Jonway Falcon was based on the mechanics and body of the Jonway A380 but with a restyled exterior and interior design.
