= Dongfeng Junfeng =

Chinese microvan

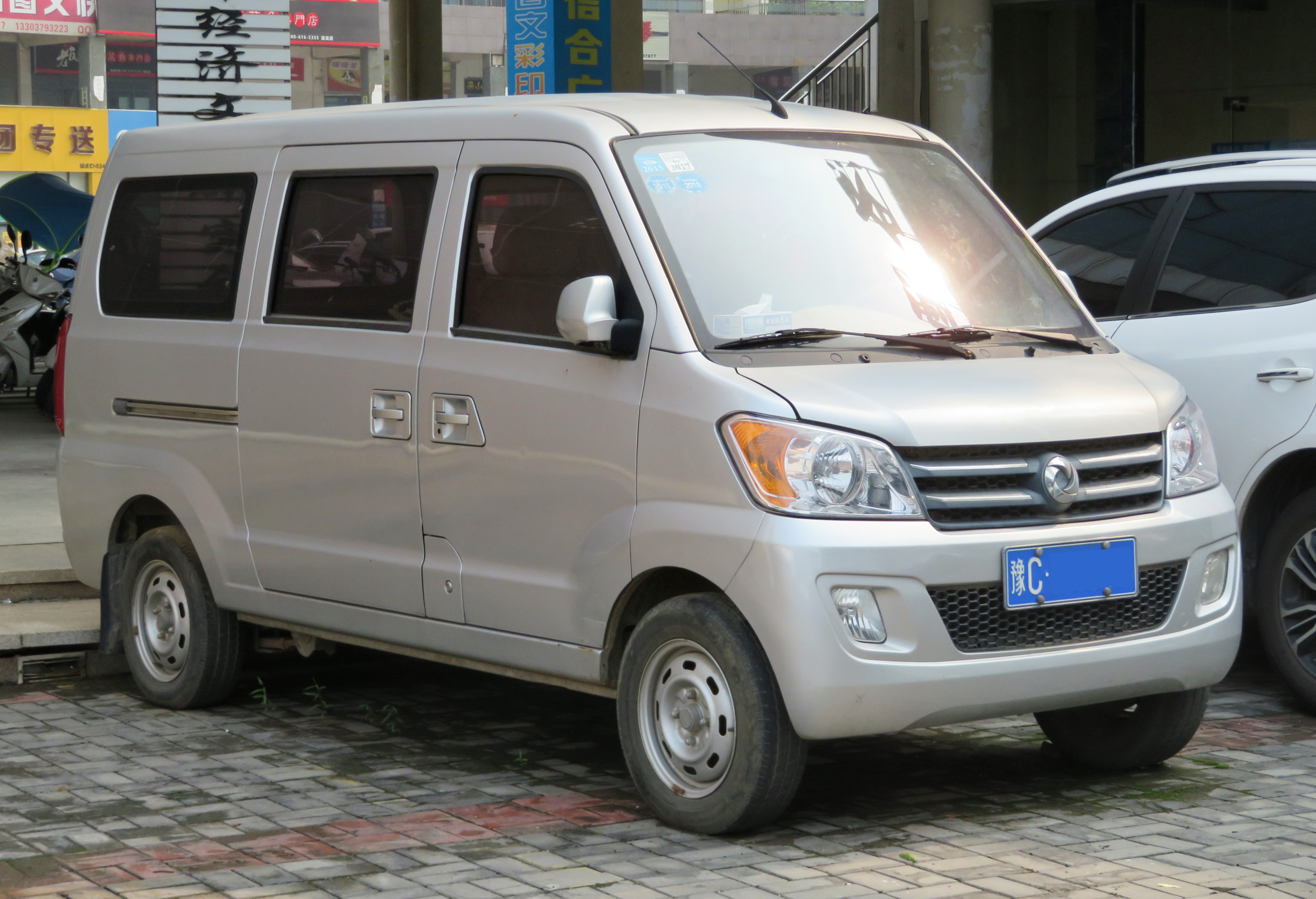

Overview
- Manufacturer: Dongfeng Motor
- Also called: Dongfeng Junfeng CV03; Dongfeng Junfeng EM10 (electric version); Skio Junfeng (rebadged electric version)
- Production: 2012–present
- Assembly: China: Zhengzhou, Henan (Zhengzhou Nissan)

Body and chassis
- Body style: 5-door minivan
- Layout: Mid engine, rear-wheel drive

Powertrain
- Engine: 1.3 L DFXC13-40 I4
- Transmission: 5-speed manual

Dimensions
- Wheelbase: 2,700 mm (106.3 in)
- Length: 4,030 mm (158.7 in)
- Width: 1,635 mm (64.4 in)
- Height: 1,910 mm (75.2 in)

The Dongfeng Junfeng (俊风) is a microvan produced by Zhengzhou Nissan Automobile, a subsidiary of Dongfeng Motor Co., Ltd.

== Overview ==
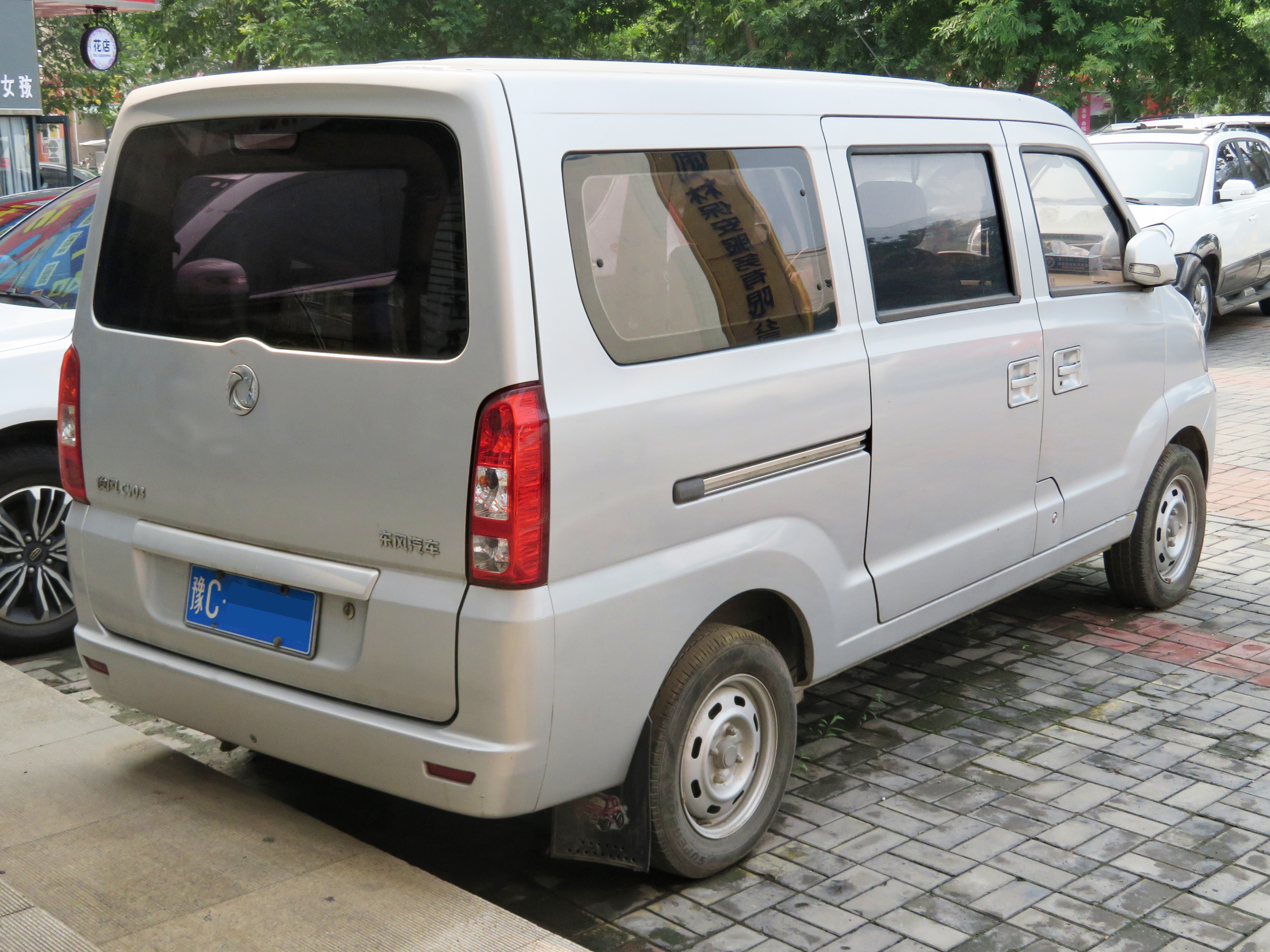
2014 Dongfeng (Zhengzhou-Nissan) Junfeng CV03 rear quarter

The Dongfeng Junfeng was originally called the Junfeng CV03 and was sold directly by Dongfeng when launched in September 2012. Later in November 2013, the exact same model was renamed to simply the Junfeng, and was sold and produced by Zhengzhou Nissan Automobile.

At the Shanghai Auto Show in 2017 Dongfeng introduced a brand called Skio also using the Junfeng as the Chinese name initially, which only focuses on electric vehicles. The brand later became Skio (时空).

=== Powertrain ===
The Dongfeng Junfeng is powered by a 1.3 liter engine producing 88 horsepower and 120N·m mated to a 5-speed manual gearbox. As of 2013, prices of the Dongfeng Junfeng ranges from 39,800 to 45,500 yuan.

== Dongfeng Ruitaite EM10 (Electric version, Gonow Way based) ==
An electric logistics version was launched in 2017 called the Dongfeng Junfeng EM10, or later the Dongfeng Ruitaite EM10. The EM10 features a completely different design with the body based on the Gonow Way and a slightly revised rear end design. The Junfeng EM10 features a 42.72kWh battery with a maximum range of 245 kilometers and supports fast charging. The motor produces 61 horsepower (45 kW).

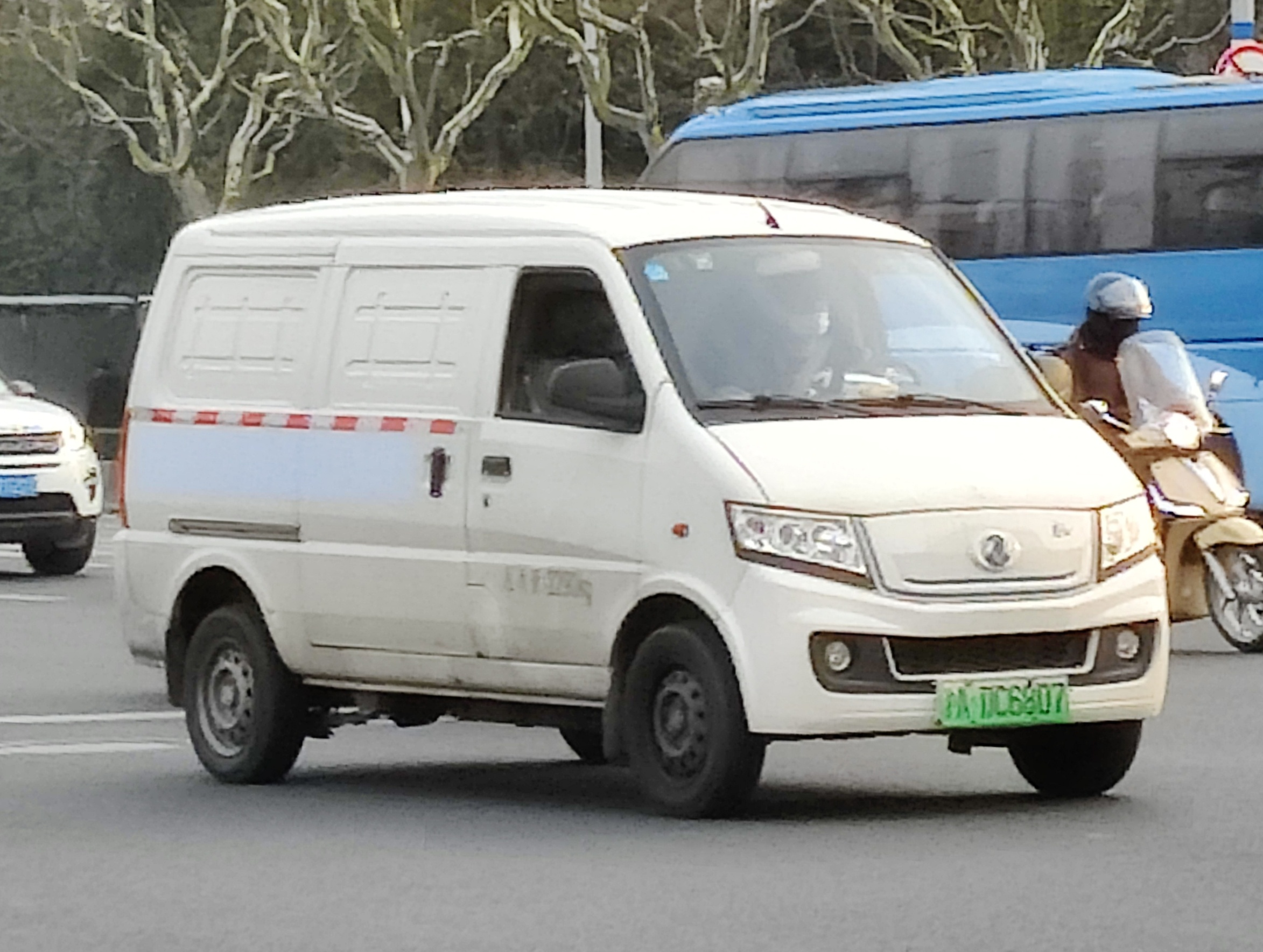
Dongfeng Ruitaite EM10 front

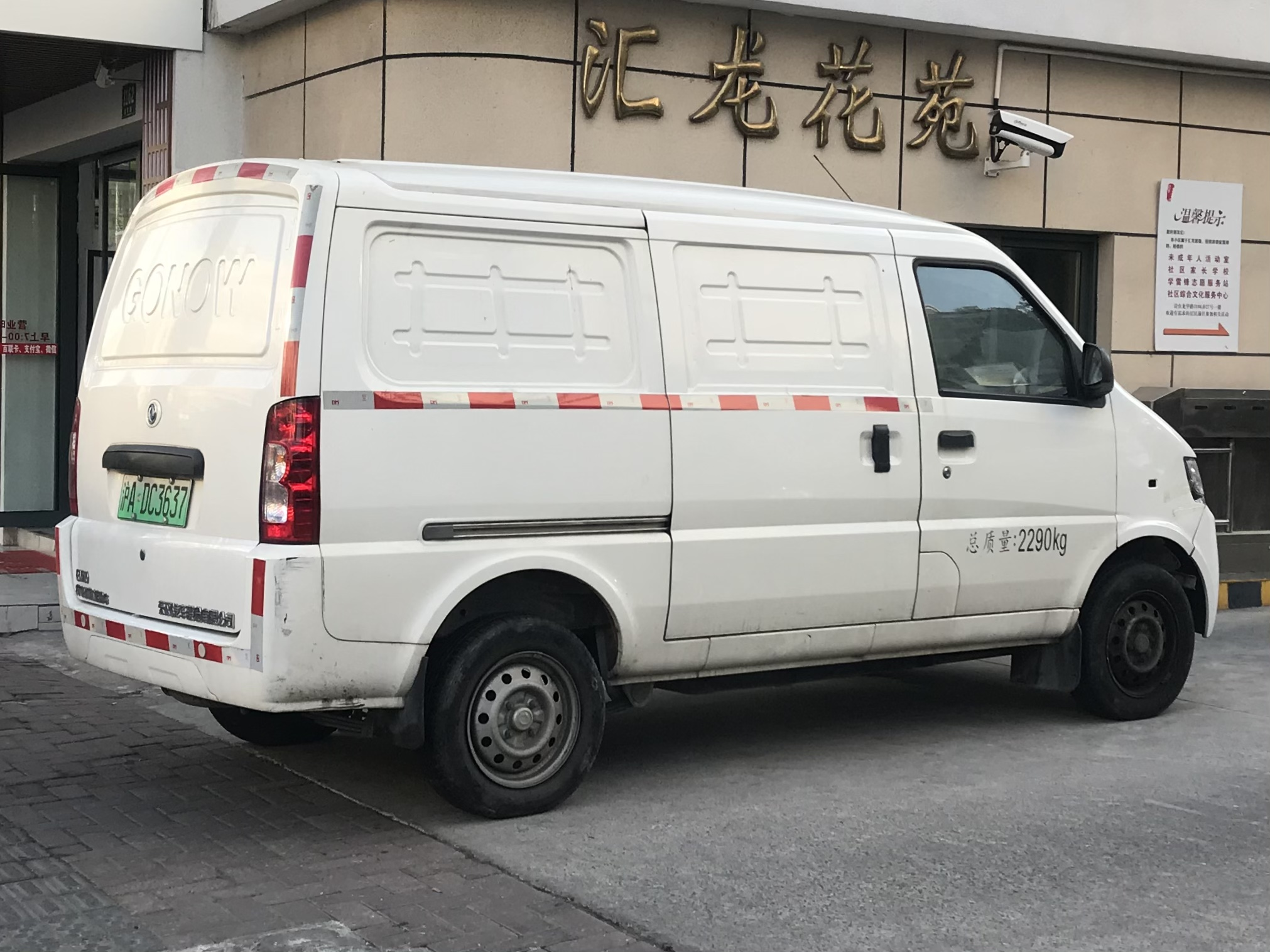
Dongfeng Ruitaite EM10 rear with the Gonow-stamped tailgate

== Skio Junfeng (Jonway Wuxing based) ==
The Skio Junfeng (东风时空俊风) sold under the Skio (时空) NEV sub-brand is developed by Dongfeng in a joint venture with Zhejiang Jonway and rebadged based on the Jonway Wuxing (永源五星) microvan. Dongfeng has teamed up with Zhejiang Skio Matrix (Shikong) and Zap Jonway to market a panel van version of the Jonway Wuxing as the new Junfeng. Skio Matrix is an electric vehicle conversion specialist and supplier of battery packs which also markets electric vehicles on behalf of Dongfeng (U-Vane EV), Zhidou, and Kandi.

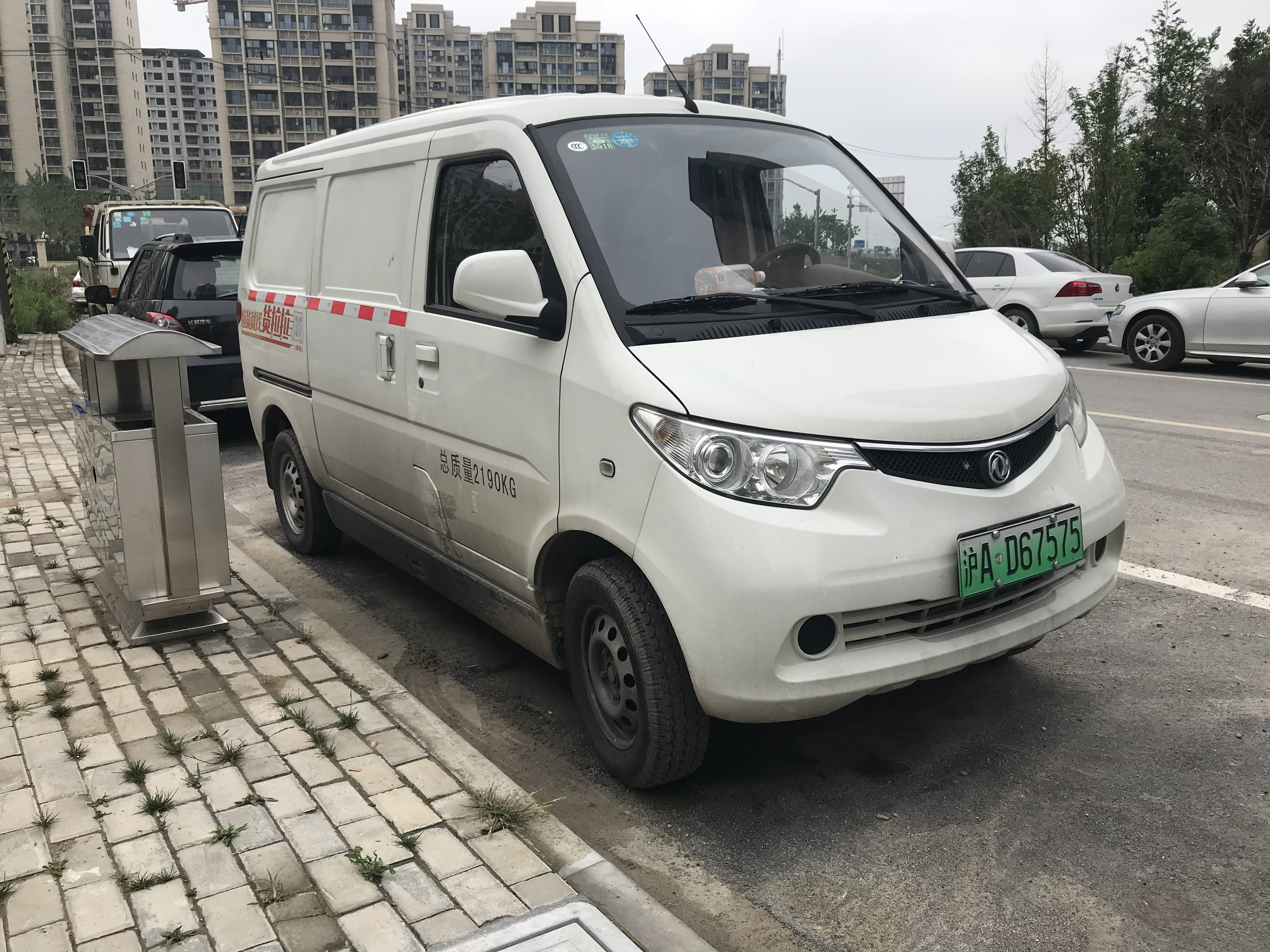
Skio Junfeng front

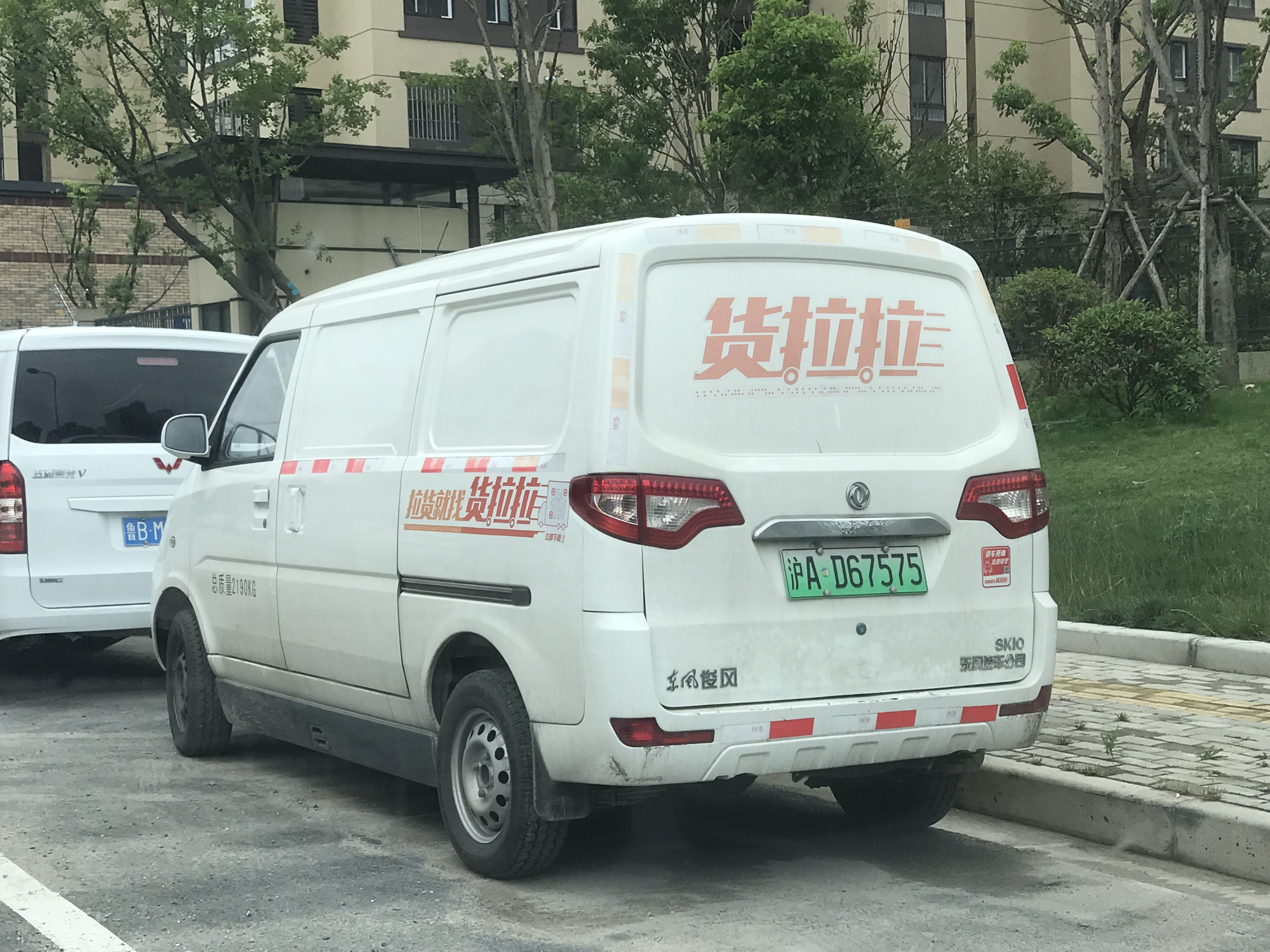
Skio Junfeng rear
