= Jonway Automobile =

Chinese automotive company

Zhejiang Jonway Automobile Co., Ltd.
- Industry: Automotive
- Founded: 2003; 23 years ago
- Headquarters: Taizhou, Zhejiang, China
- Products: Automobiles
- Number of employees: 800
- Parent: ZAP (51%)

Zhejiang Jonway Automobile Co., Ltd. (Chinese: 浙江永源汽车有限公司; pinyin: Zhèjiāng yǒng yuán qìchē yǒuxiàn gōngsī), trading as Jonway Automobile, is a Chinese automobile manufacturer founded in 2003 and based in Taizhou, Zhejiang.

== History ==
The Jonway Automobile represents the automotive division of the Jonway Group created in 2005. The first product launched on the market was the model Jonway UFO A380 a copy (not licensed) of the second generation Toyota RAV4 (XA20) proposed in both three-door short wheelbase and five-door long wheelbase. The car immediately got high media exposure because of the similarity with the original Japanese model in every detail.

The model was subsequently exported to many Asian markets and also appeared in Europe at the International Motor Show Germany 2007 in Frankfurt am Main. Also in 2007, Jonway and DR Motor Company signed an agreement for the assembly of the UFO three-door in Macchia d'Isernia in Italy in a restyled and re-homologated version for European standards; the car renamed DR3 was unveiled at the concept car stage at the Bologna Motor Show 2007. However, the negotiations with DR Motor failed and the project for the European UFO/DR3 was abandoned.

In July 2010, the American manufacturer ZAP acquired 51% of Jonway Automobile and the joint venture ZAP-Jonway was created, specializing in the construction of electric cars; the first product was the A380 EV launched on the Chinese market.

In 2012, Jonway bought the historic "Viotti" name belonging to Carrozzeria Viotti and relaunched the company, establishing new headquarters in Rivoli, in the province of Turin. The new company represented the European division of Jonway as well as the research and development center specializing in the design of hybrid vehicles, and in the engineering of sports cars. Emanuele Bomboi is hired as head of design. It signed an agreement with the Maggiora coachbuilder to make a deep restyling of its UFO-A380 model. The model exhibited at the concept car stadium was to go into production at the end of 2013. In May of the same year, it launched a minivan called Wuxing on the Chinese market.

In 2013, it presented a second SUV named Falcon based on the mechanics and body of the A380 but with a completely new exterior and interior design.

In 2014, it sold the shares of Viotti to the Fabbrica Italiana Automobili Maggiora S.r.l.

In April 2012, the Chinese automaker Zhejiang Jonway Group purchased the intellectual property of Aptera Motors from creditors, and in May, it announced that it would start manufacturing the 2e at its factory in Shanghai and intended to ship chassis to a small assembly plant, initially employing 15-20 people, that it would set up in Santa Rosa, with sales commencing in early 2013. Jonway was a major investor in Zap Jonway, which had been working on electric cars in Santa Rosa since the mid-1990s. The company planned to name the US company "Zaptera USA" and it displayed a prototype 2e next to a Zap Jonway car at the Beijing Motor Show. However, the close association with Zap was met with protest by electric-car enthusiasts and by May, the company said it would call the company Aptera USA and keep it independent of Zap Jonway.

In June 2013, Zaptera USA said it would split into two companies: the existing Jonway-owned Zaptera USA, and an independent Aptera USA; Zaptera would make the all-electric 2e and Aptera would make a gasoline-powered version called the 2g. However, by mid-May the following year, those new Aptera companies had gone silent.

== Products ==
Jonway Automobile products are listed as follows:

- Jonway A380 - compact crossover
- Jonway Falcon - compact crossover
- Jonway Wuxing - compact MPV
- Jonway E4X3
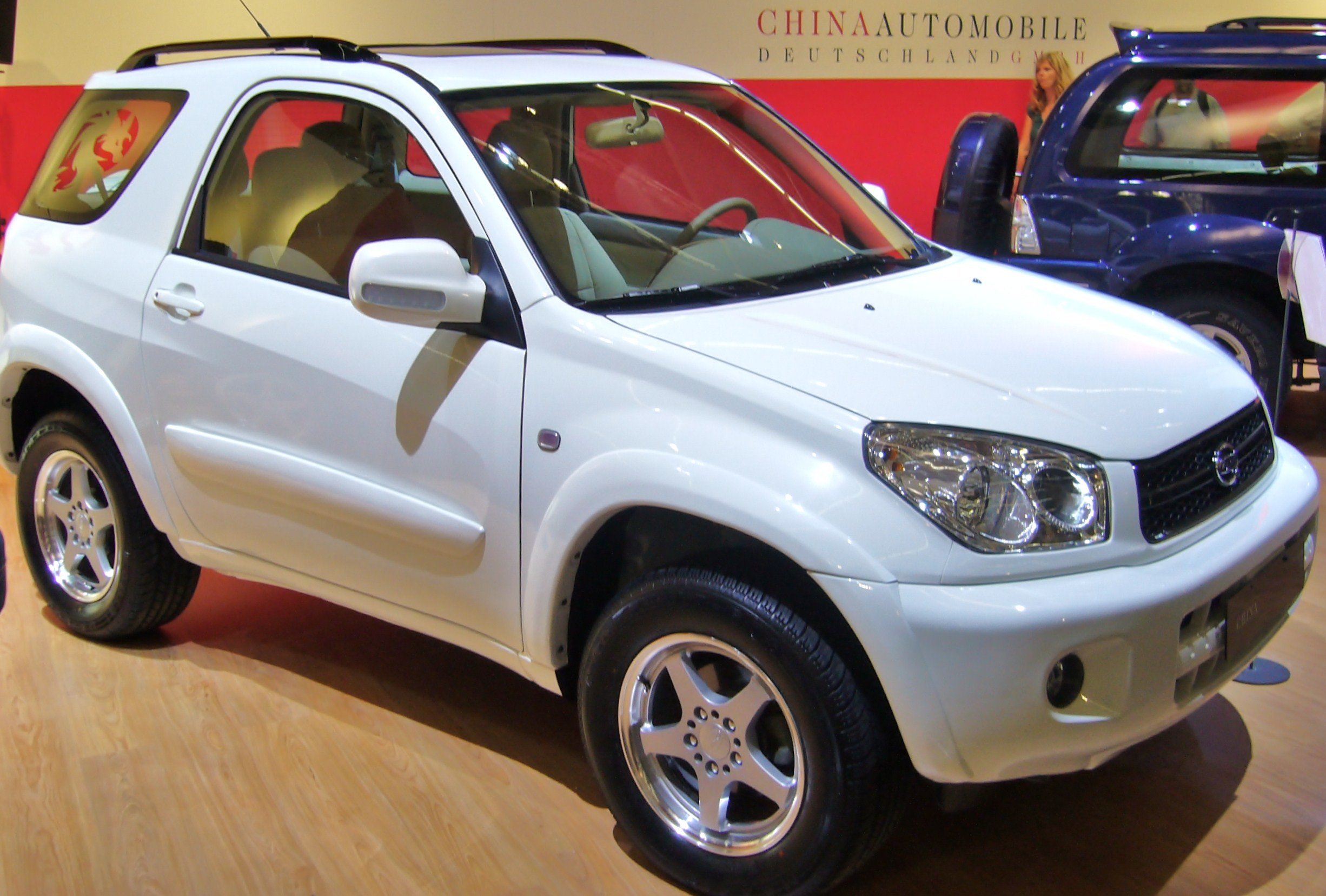
A Jonway UFO 3-door at the IAA 2007 in Frankfurt am Main

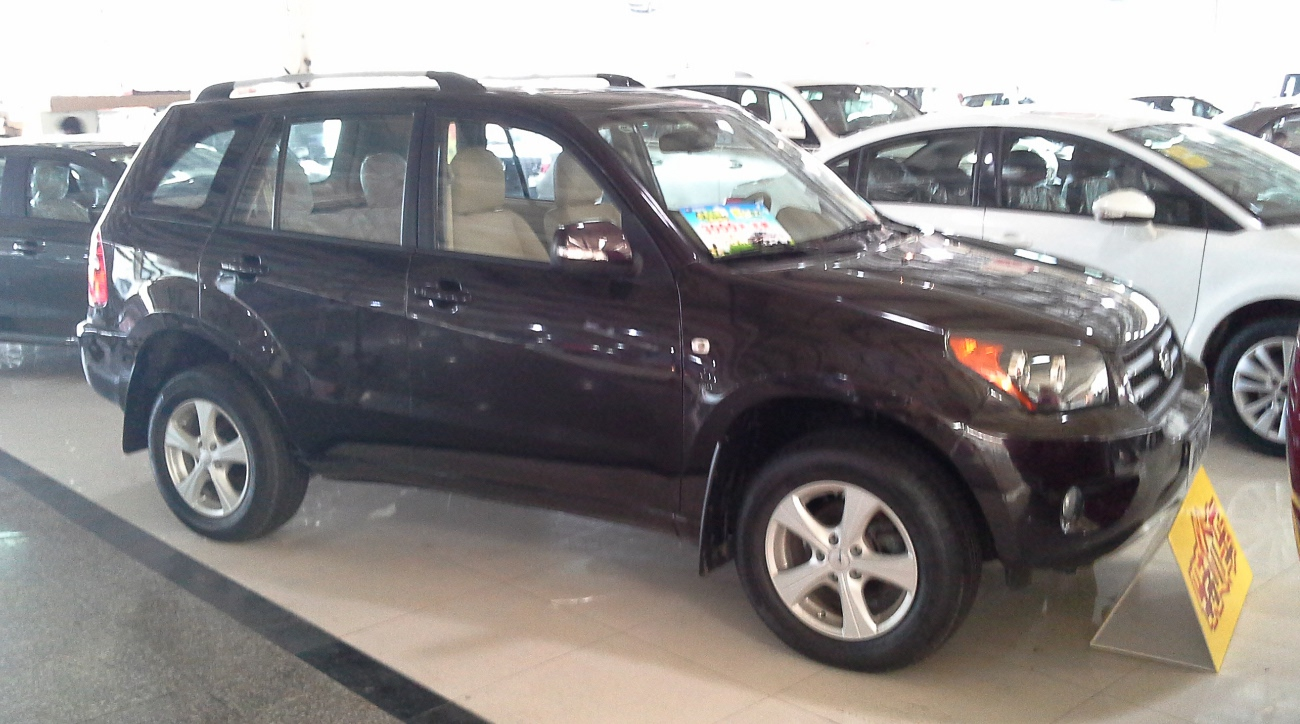
Jonway UFO 5-door

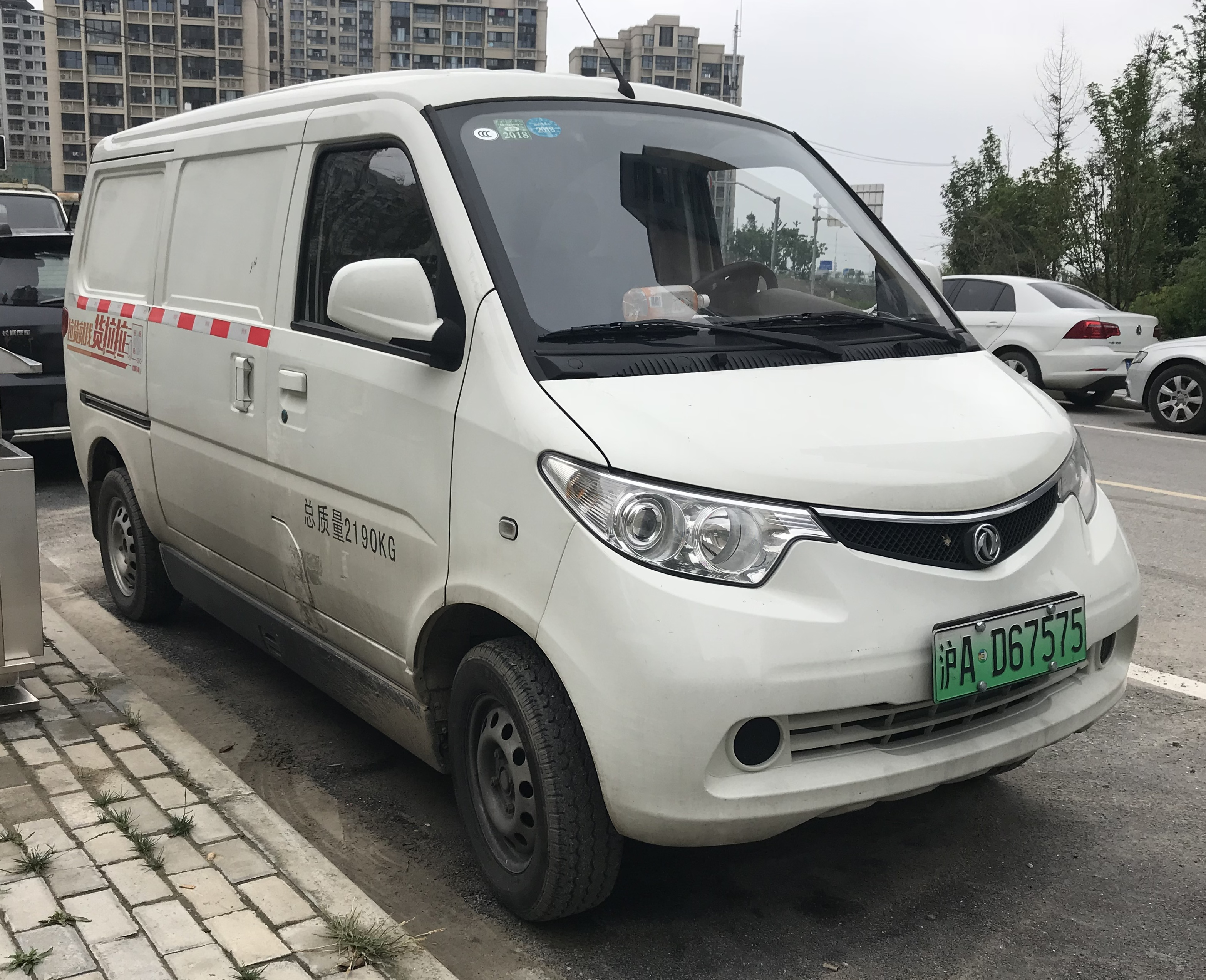
A Dongfeng Skio Junfeng rebadged Jonway Wuxing (The Skio Junfeng is based on the Jonway Wuxing platform and design)
