= List of microcars by country of origin: A =

== List ==
Country	Automobile Name	Manufacturer	Engine Make/Capacity	Seats	Year	Other information
Argentina	De Carlo 200 'Minicar'	Metalmecánica S.A.C José C. Paz, Buenos Aires	200 cc	2	1959	
Argentina	Dinarg D-200	Dinámica Industrial Argentina S.A., Córdoba	191 cc	2+2	1959–1969	
Argentina	Fiat 600	Fiat Concord S.A.C.I., Buenos Aires	Fiat 633 cc	4	1960–1962	
Australia	Edith	Gray & Harper Pty, Melbourne	Villiers 197 cc	2	1953–1957	Using a 197cc rear mounted Villiers engine, a 4-speed gearbox and independent suspensionon all wheels, the Edith was produces in small numbers with about twelve 3-wheelers and four 4-wheelers were made. The low-slung aluminum 2-seater had a claimed top speed of 58 mph and a claimed economy of 95mpg.
Australia	Goggomobil Dart	Buckle Motors Pty Ltd, Sydney	300 cc or 400 cc	2	1959–1962	Fibreglass body with imported Goggomobil components from Glas in Dingolfing, Germany
Australia	Zeta	Lightburn, Adelaide	Villiers 324 cc or Sachs 493 cc (roadster model only)	2	1964–1965	Sedan, Roadster and Utility models made.
Austria	Felber Autoroller	A. Felber & Co, Vienna	Rotax 398 cc	2	1952–1953	
Austria	Haflinger	Steyr-Daimler-Puch Spezialfahrzeug GmbH, Steyr	646 cc	2	1959-1974	Light weight Four-wheel drive vehicle
Austria	Libelle	Innsbruck		2	1954	
Austria	Möve 101	Vienna			1953	Based on Felber Autoroller rolling chassis
