= Möve =

Möve may refer to:

- Möve 101, an Austrian built microcar
- Move (1939 ship), a former passenger ship on Lake Zurich, Switzerland
- SMS Möwe, several ships of the German and Austro-Hungarian navies
