= 1961 Australian GT Championship =

Motor racing competition

Seasons
- ← 1960 1962 →

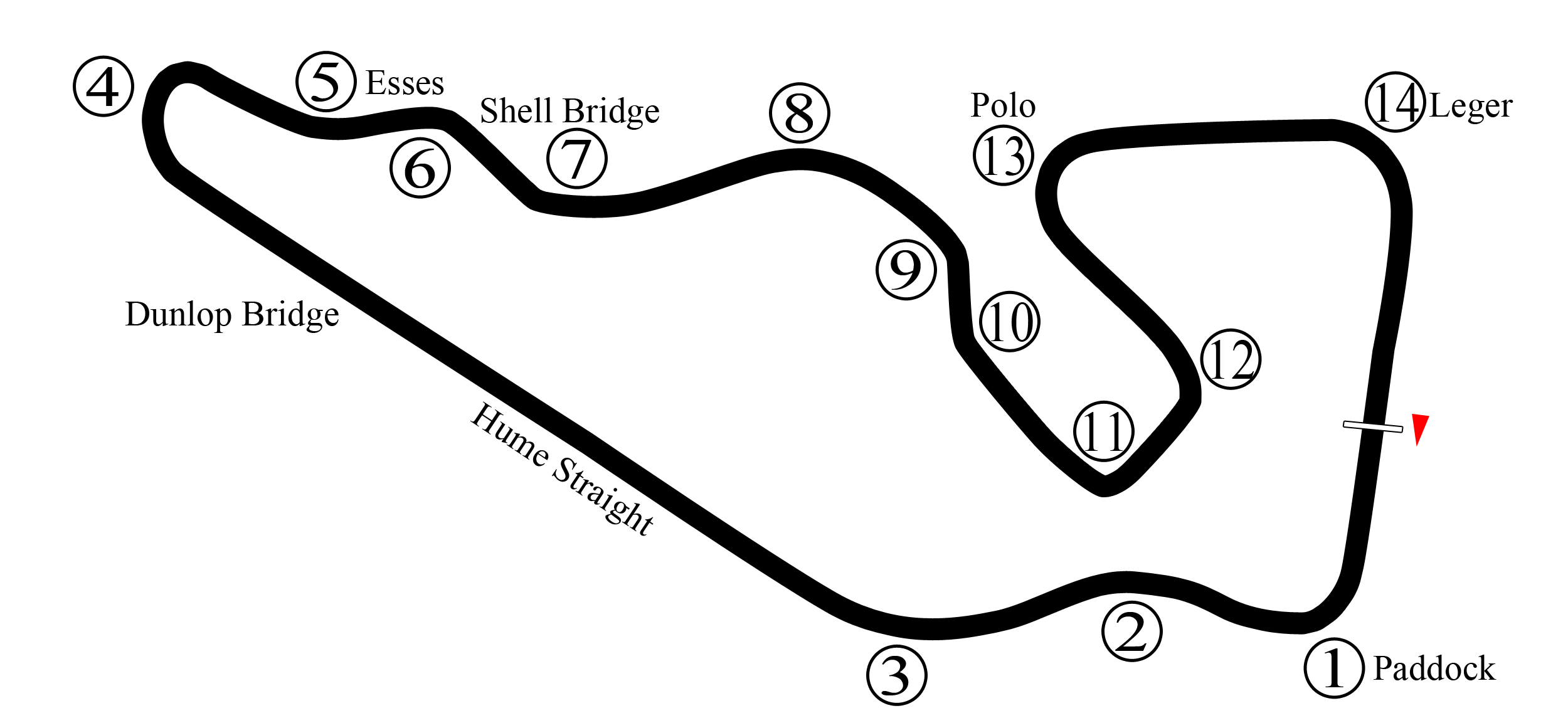
Layout of the Warwick Farm Raceway (1960-1973)

The 1961 Australian GT Championship was a CAMS sanctioned Australian motor racing title for Appendix K GT cars. The title, which was the second Australian GT Championship, was contested over a single 50 mile race held at the Warwick Farm circuit, in New South Wales, Australia on 30 July 1961. The race was conducted by the Australian Automobile Racing Co.

The championship was won by Frank Matich driving a Jaguar D-Type.

== Results ==
| Position | Driver | No. | Car | Entrant | Laps |
|---|---|---|---|---|---|
| 1 | Frank Matich | 36 | Jaguar D-Type | Team Leaton | 23 |
| 2 | David McKay | 14 | Lola 1100 | Scuderia Veloce | 23 |
| 3 | Brian Foley | 1 | Austin-Healey Sprite | B. Foley | 22 |
| 4 | Bob Jane | 33 | Maserati 300S | Autoland Pty. Ltd. | 22 |
| 5 | Greg Cusack | 20 | Porsche Super 90 | G. Cusack | 22 |
| 6 | Brian Lawler | 28 | Buckle | B. Lawler | 22 |
| ? | Keith Malcolm | 30 | Skoden | Bass Hill Service Station | |
| ? | John Callaway | 18 | MGA Twin Cam | Monaro Motors | |
| ? | Les Howard | 3 | Austin-Healey Sprite | Howard & Sons | |
| ? | Harry Firth | 37 | Jaguar 3.8 | Autoland Pty. Ltd. | |
| ? | Bob Holden | 2 | Austin-Healey Sprite | Killara Motor Garage | |
| ? | Harry Cape | 17 | MGA Twin Cam | H. Cape | |
| ? | H. Fenton | 22 | Peugeot 203 | H. G. Fenton | |
| ? | Martin Faithfull | 15 | Simca | Killara Motor Garage | |
| DNF | Ralph Sach | 16 | MGA Twin Cam | R. Orlando | |
| DNF | Graham White | 23 | Porsche | Continental Motors | 12 |
| DNF | Bruce McPhee | 31 | Holden FE | Wyong Motors | 5 |
| DNF | Ron Hodgson | 10 | Lotus Eleven Coventry Climax | Stathfield Motors Pty. Ltd. | 3 |
| DNF | Leo Geoghegan | 11 | Lotus Elite | Geoghegan Motors | 2 |
| DNF | Bryan Thomson | 26 | Monza Holden | Ecurie Shepparton | 0 |
| DNS | Harry Howard | 19 | Simca Aronde | Howard & Sons | - |
| DNS | Peter Manton | 4 | Morris 850 | Monaro Motors | - |
| DNS | Max Laroux | 7 | Morris Minor 1000 | W. Mitchell | - |
| DNS | L. J. Callaway | 18 | MGA Twin Cam | Monaro Motors | - |
| DNS | A. R. Allen | 5 | Morris 850 | A. R. Allen | - |
| DNS | Peter Williamson | 32 | Buckle | P. Williamson | - |
| DNS | Ken Lindsay | 29 | Holden | Ken Lindsay Motors | - |
| DNS | J. McKeown | 27 | Jewitt Holden | T. M. Motors | - |
| DNS | Bill Mitchell | 25 | Lotus Holden | W. Mitchell | - |

=== Notes ===
- Attendance: 25,000
- Number of entries in Official Programme: 33
- Number of starters: 20
- Pole position: Frank Matich (Jaguar D-Type)
- Fastest lap: Frank Matich (Jaguar D-Type), 1:53.5 (71.80 mph)
- Winner's race time: 44:40.8 (69.47 mph)
- Winning margin: 2:07.8
