= 1960 Australian GT Championship =

Motor racing competition

Seasons
- ← none 1961 →

Layout of the Mount Panorama Circuit (1938-1986)

The 1960 Australian GT Championship was a CAMS sanctioned Australian motor racing title for drivers of cars complying with Appendix K Gran Turismo regulations. The title, which was the inaugural Australian GT Championship, was contested over a single 50-mile race held at the Mount Panorama Circuit, Bathurst, New South Wales on 2 October 1960.

The championship was won by Leo Geoghegan driving a Lotus Elite.

== Results ==
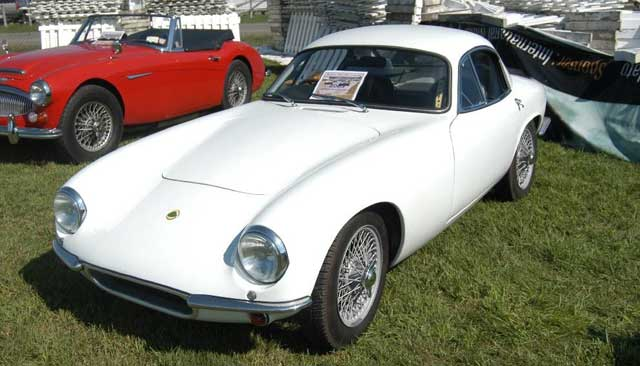
Leo Geoghegan won the championship driving a Lotus Elite, similar to the example pictured above

Position	Driver	No.	Car	Entrant	Class	Laps
1	Leo Geoghegan	3	Lotus Elite	Geoghegan Motors Liverpool	1001 to 1300cc	13
2	Gavin Youl	38	Porsche Super 90	G.B. Youl	1301 to 1600cc	13
3	Ian Geoghegan	1	Holden	Geoghegan Motors Liverpool	2001 to 2600cc	13
4	Tony Basile	6	Porsche	S. Sakzewski	1301 to 1600cc	13
5	Ron Marshall	23	AC Ace Bristol	R. E. Marshall	1601 to 2000cc	13
6	John Suttor	120	Jaguar XK140	J. Suttor	2601 to 3500cc	12
7	Keith Malcolm	153	Skoden	Bass Hill Service Station	2001 to 2600cc	12
8	Harry Cape	130	MGA	H. Cape	1301 to 1600cc	12
9	Peter Manton	41	Austin Lancer	Monaro Motors	1601 to 2000cc	12
10	Frank Hann	7	Jaguar Mark V GMC	F. J. Hann	2601 to 3500cc	?
11	Ken Brigden	63	Peugeot 403	K. A. Brigden	1601 to 2000cc	?
12	Brian Foley	11	Kinsley Sprite	Kinsley Motors Pty. Ltd.	751 to 1000cc	?
13	H. Van Schaik	15	Simca	H. Van Schaik	1001 to 1300cc	?
14	B. Pflock	18	Austin A30	B. Pflock	751 to 1000cc	?
15	R. Bulloch	58	Triumph Herald	R. Bulloch	751 to 1000cc	?
16	Ted Ansell	40	NSU Prinz 30	T. Ansell	501 to 750cc	?
DNF	C. Adams	49	Austin-Healey Sprite	S. Brown	751 to 1000cc	?
DNF	Albert Bridge	110	Peugeot 203	A. W. Bridge	1301 to 1600cc	?
DNF	J. Malcolm	41	Austin Lancer	Dents Auto Service	1601 to 2000cc	?
DNF	John Bisset	88	Buckle	J. Bisset	2001 to 2600cc	?
DNF	C. Kane	87	Buckle	C. Kane	2001 to 2600cc	?
DNF	Barry Gurdon	20	Austin A90 s/c	Gurdon Motors P/L	2601 to 3500cc	?
DNF	Lang Longmore	19	Ford Zephyr	L. J. Longmore	2001 to 2600cc	9
DNF	R. Rees	98	Ford Zephyr	R. W. Rees	Over 3500cc	?
DNF	Warren Blomfield	116	JWF Holden	W. Blomfield	2001 to 2600cc	?
DNF	Reg Smith	62	Porsche Super 90	R. Smith	1301 to 1600cc	2
DNF	Alan Ling	99	Holden FE	A. H. Ling	2001 to 2600cc	2
DNF	Bill Buckle	90	Buckle	W.F. Buckle	2601 to 3500cc	2
DNF	John Caines	22	Ausca Repco Holden	Caines Car Sales Pty. Ltd.	2001 to 2600cc	2
DNF	Wally Mitchell	16	Lotus Repco Holden	W. Mitchell	2001 to 2600cc	1
DNS	K. Lindsay	39	Holden	Ken Lindsay Motors	2001 to 2600cc	-
DNS	J. Caines	52	Holden	Caines Car Sales P/L	2001 to 2600cc	-
DNS	Ron Hodgson	69	Buckle	Strathfield Motors P/L	2601 to 3500cc	-
DNS	Barry Topen	104	Buckle	B. D. Topen	2601 to 3500cc	-

== Notes ==
- Winner's race time: 40m 54.1s
- Fastest lap: Leo Geoghegan, (Lotus Elite), 3m 5.3s, track record.
