= Buckle Sports Coupe =

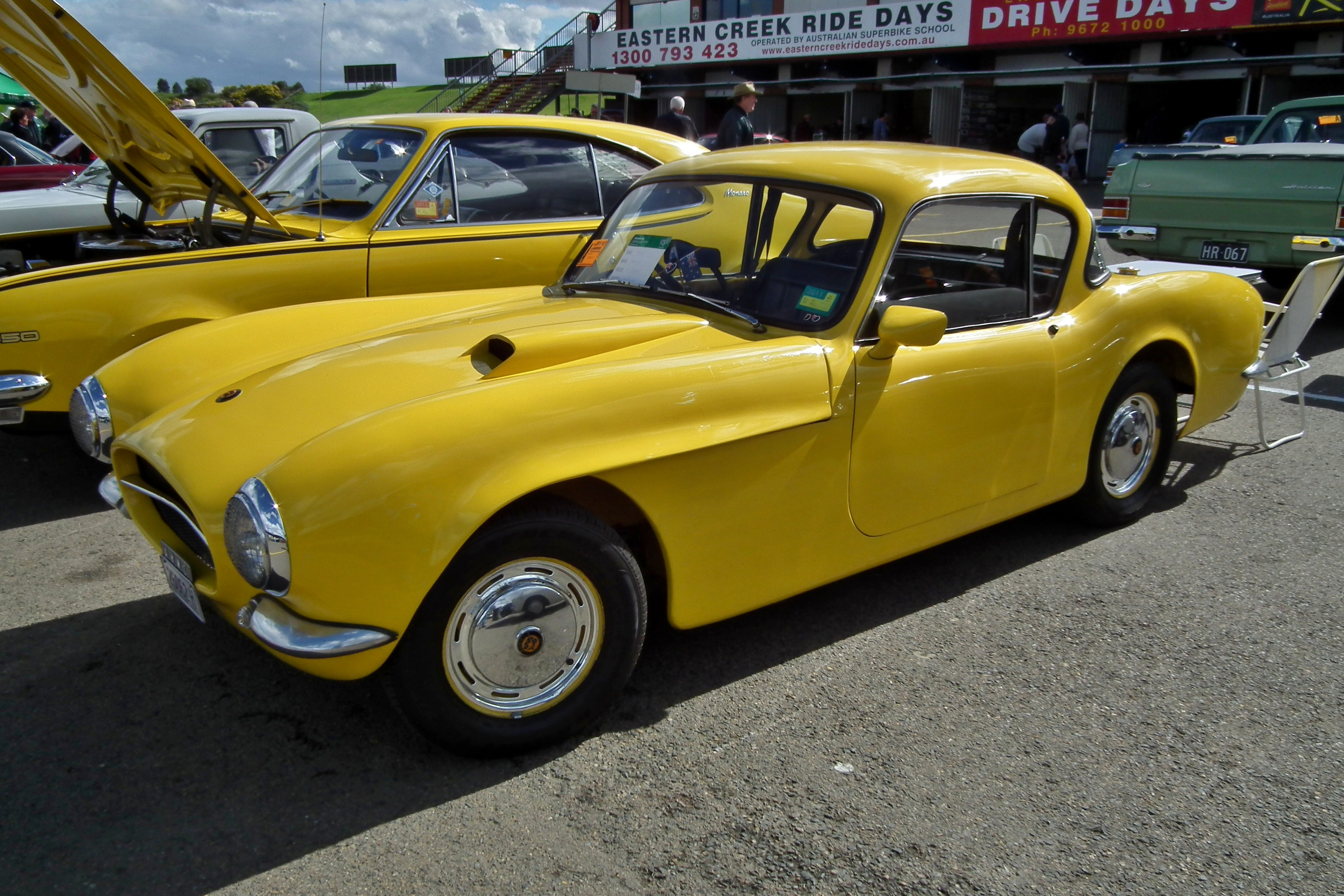

Overview
- Manufacturer: Buckle Motors
- Also called: Buckle Coupe
- Production: 1957–1959; 20 produced
- Assembly: Punchbowl, New South Wales

Body and chassis
- Class: Sports car (S)
- Body style: 2-door coupe
- Layout: FR

Powertrain
- Engine: 2,553 cc (156 cu in) Ford Zephyr straight-6

Dimensions
- Curb weight: 865 kg (1,907 lb)

The Buckle Sports Coupe is a fibreglass-bodied sports car which was produced in Australia by Buckle Motors from 1957 to 1959. The 2-door coupe used a combination of Ford Zephyr Six and Ford Zephyr Mark II components, including a straight-6 engine from the Mark II. Thanks to its fibreglass body, it had a relatively light weight of 865 kg (1,907 lb) and a top speed of 160 km/h (99 mph). It also featured a box chassis frame, transverse leaf spring front suspension and a conventional Ford rear axle.

A total of twenty Buckles were produced, including two incomplete examples sold for racing purposes. Bill Buckle, the person behind the creation of the car, would go on to a successful business venture building Goggomobil cars in Australia, the highpoint of which was the production of the Australian designed Goggomobil Dart.

== Motorsport ==
The Buckle performed well in hillclimb events and circuit races and held many records. Sixteen of the twenty Buckles built competed in motor sport, a highlight being Dick Newell's victory in the 1963 New South Wales GT Championship.

A special Buckle (Body#93-883) was built specifically for racing purposes and was raced by Bill Buckle himself circa 1960–1961. It featured a lightweight body moulded around a tubular chassis, a Raymond Mays-developed cylinder head and three SU carburetors.

== Gallery ==
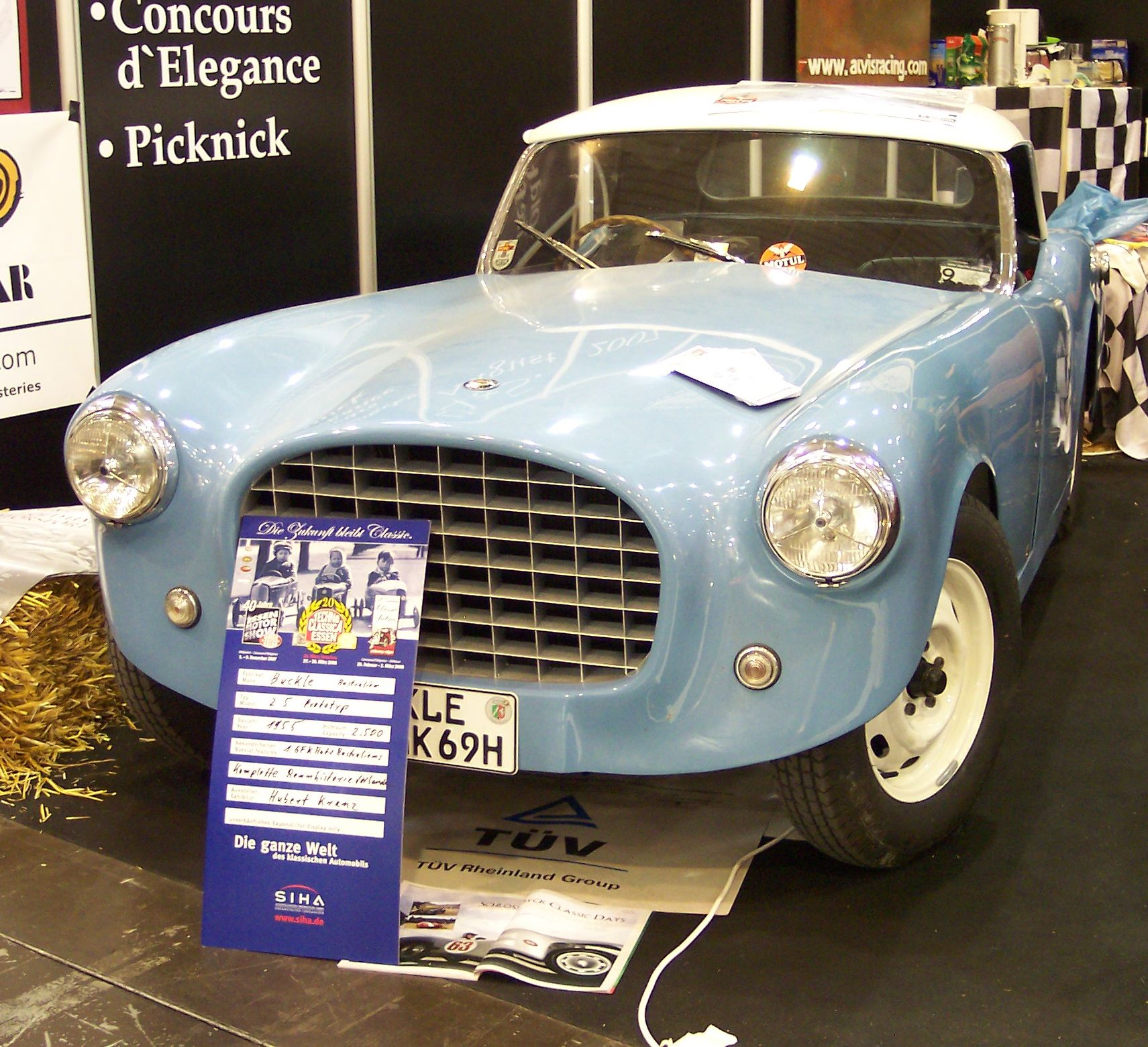
1955 prototype.

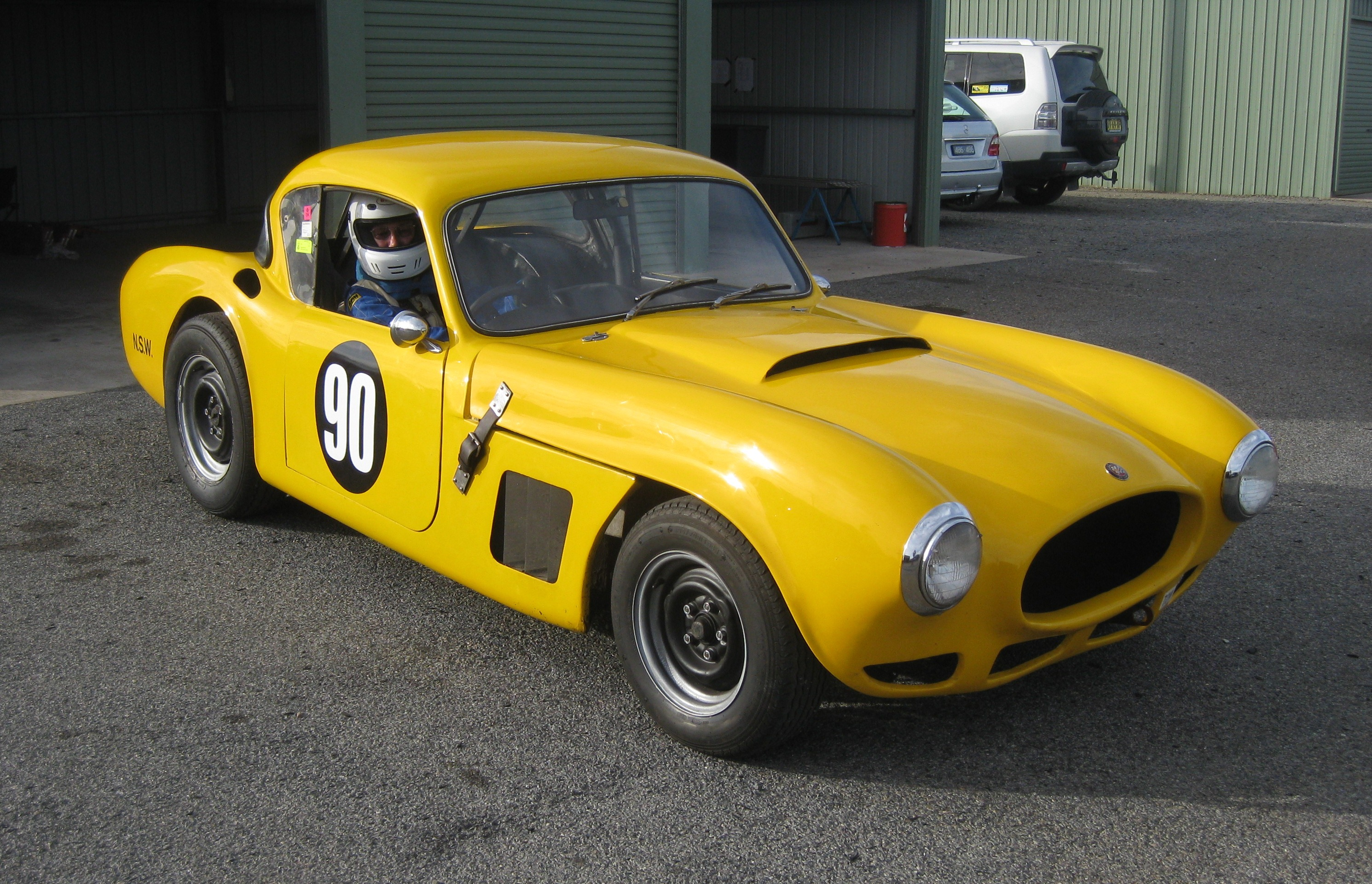
Buckle GT Lightweight of John Ashwell, pictured in 2012. This car was raced by Bill Buckle himself circa 1960–1961.

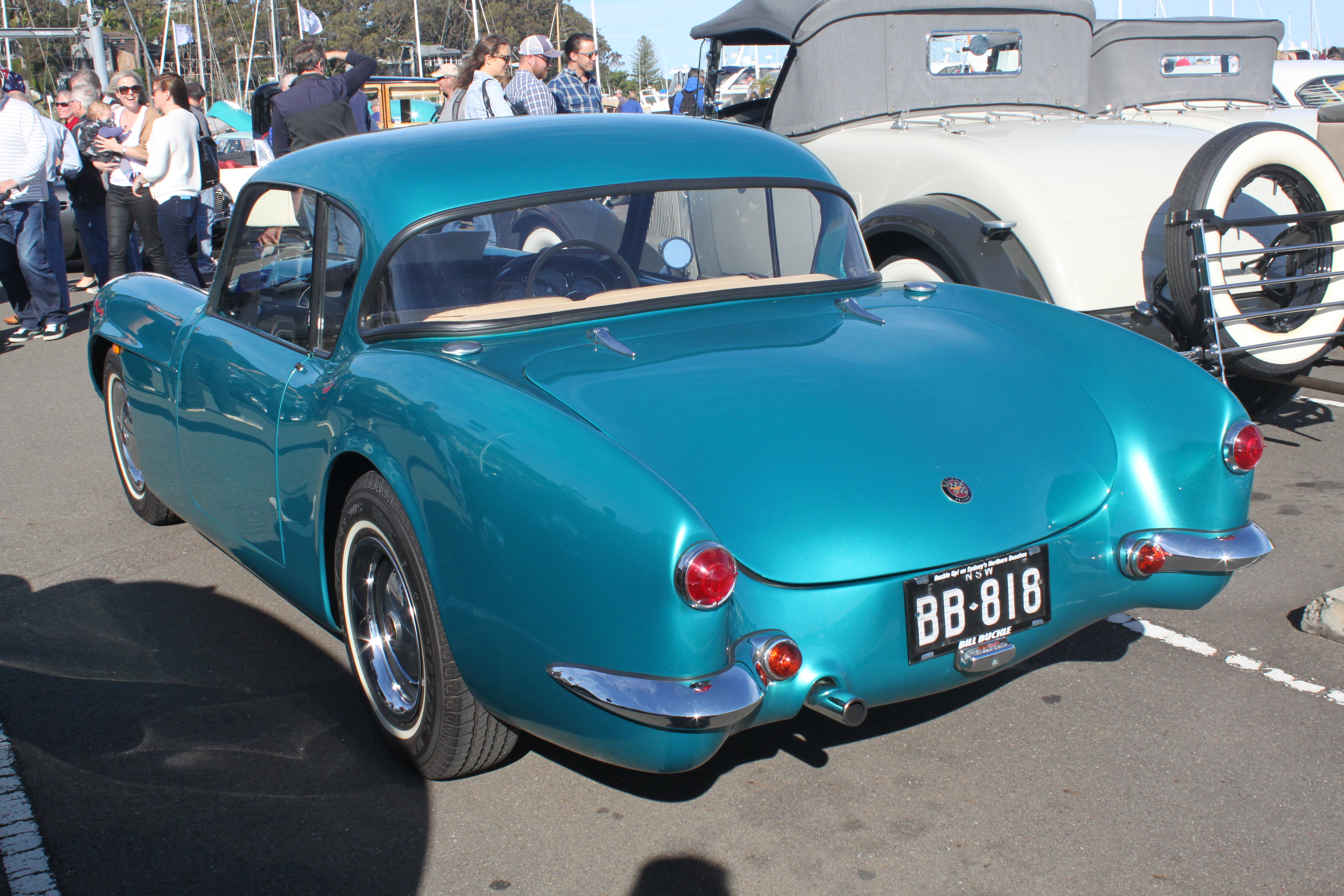
Rear view.

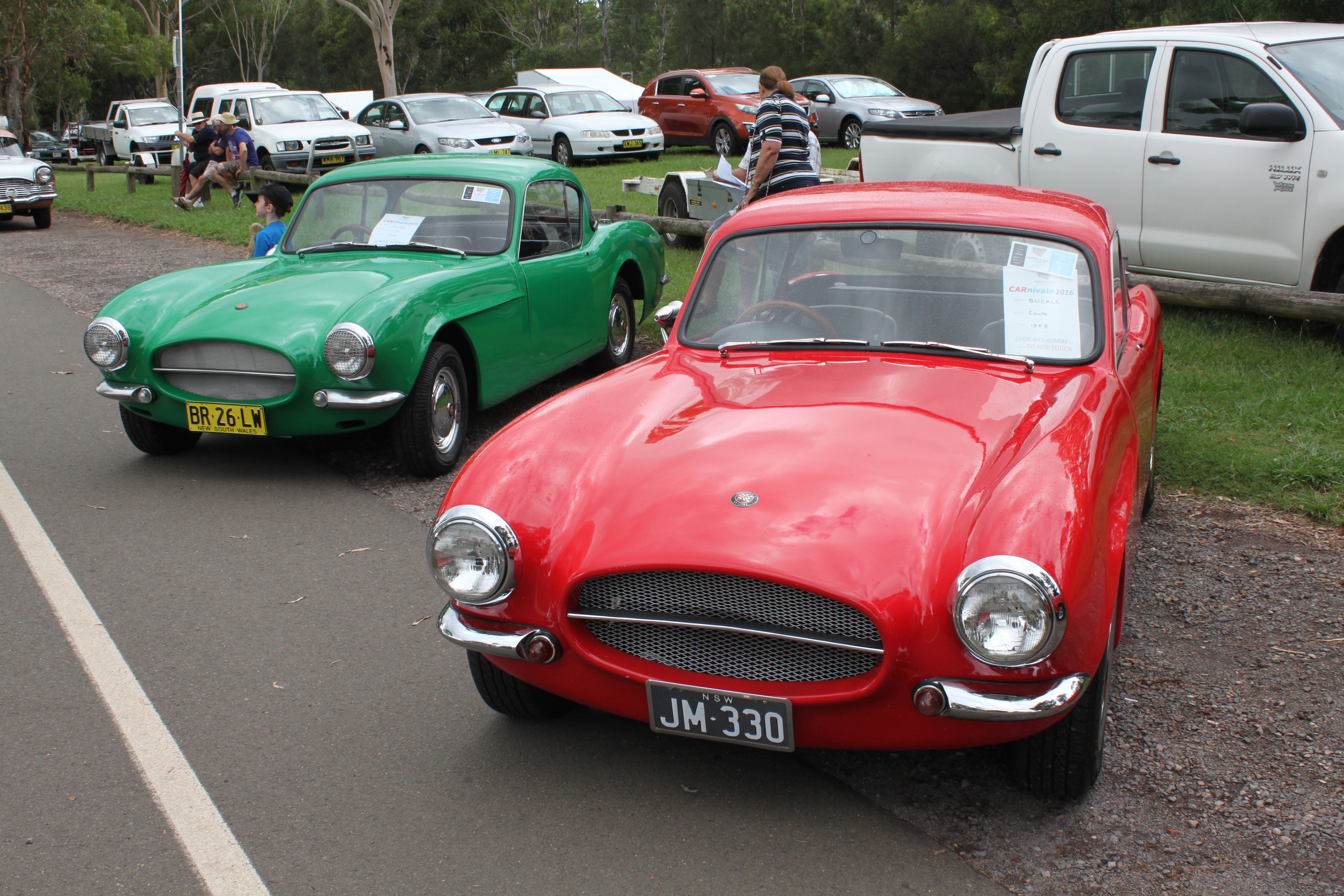
A pair of Buckle Coupes at a car show.
