= Felber Autoroller =

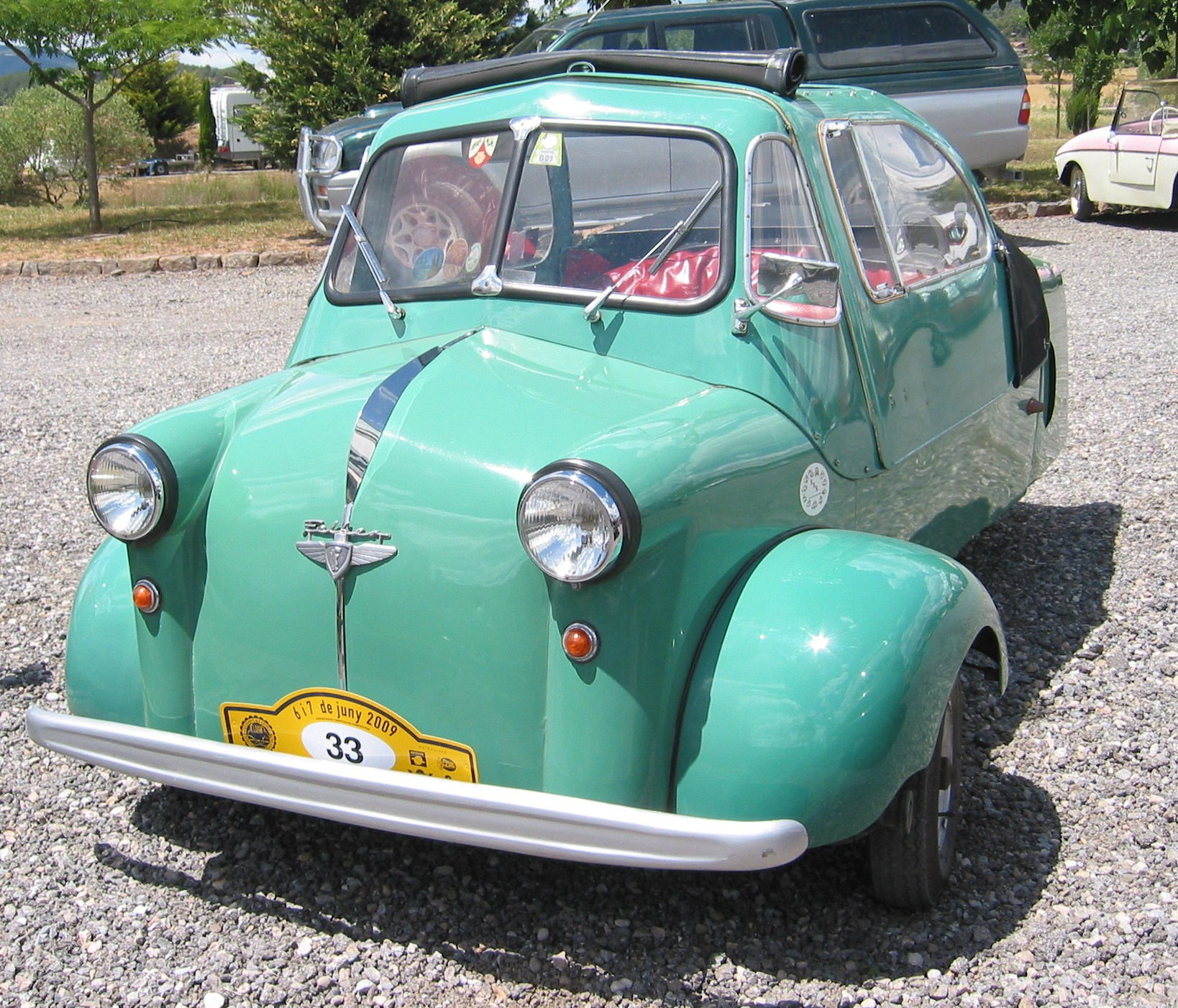

Overview
- Manufacturer: A. Felber & Co
- Production: 1952 to 1953
- Assembly: Vienna, Austria

Body and chassis
- Class: microcar
- Body style: 1-door Cabrio coach
- Layout: RR layout

Powertrain
- Engine: 398 cc, 2-cylinder opposed twin, Two-stroke

The Felber Autoroller T 400 is a three-wheeled microcar with a rear-mounted 398 cc Rotax two cylinder opposed twin, two stroke 15 metric horsepower (11 kW) engine. The cars have an unusual seating arrangement, with a small child-sized seat behind the driver on the left and a conventional passenger seat diagonally behind and to the right.

A. Felber & Co were a well known manufacturer of motorcycle sidecars, based in Vienna, Austria. The Autoroller was designed by Ernst Marold. From 1952 to 1953, about 400 units were built in two versions, all of which were painted light green using a standard paint then used for machinery which was cheaper than car paint. Early models had cycle-type mudguards that swivelled with the front wheels, later models had fixed wings.

The owners had a very active club; The Austrian Autoroller Club, whose newsletter can be found in the Austrian National Library. In 1954, at the wedding of Mr. Marold, a remarkable corso of Felbers accompanied the wedding limousine in front of the Karlskirche in the Viennese City centre.

After the liberalisation of car imports into Austria in 1954, car manufacture proved uncompetitive and the company began the manufacture of industrial washing machines instead. The company also moved into the sale and distribution of cars from Heinkel, Trojan, Spatz and Reliant.

About twelve rolling chassis were delivered to specialist coachbuilding company Hofmann & Moldrich in Vienna who built upon them an egg shaped body out of 0.8mm aluminium plate called Möve 101. The only known remaining car is in the car museum in Aspang in Lower-Austria.

Two surviving Felbers are to be seen in the RRR scooter and microcar museum in Eggenburg, Austria. A third one is under restoration in Serbia near to the Hungarian border and one in Bavaria.

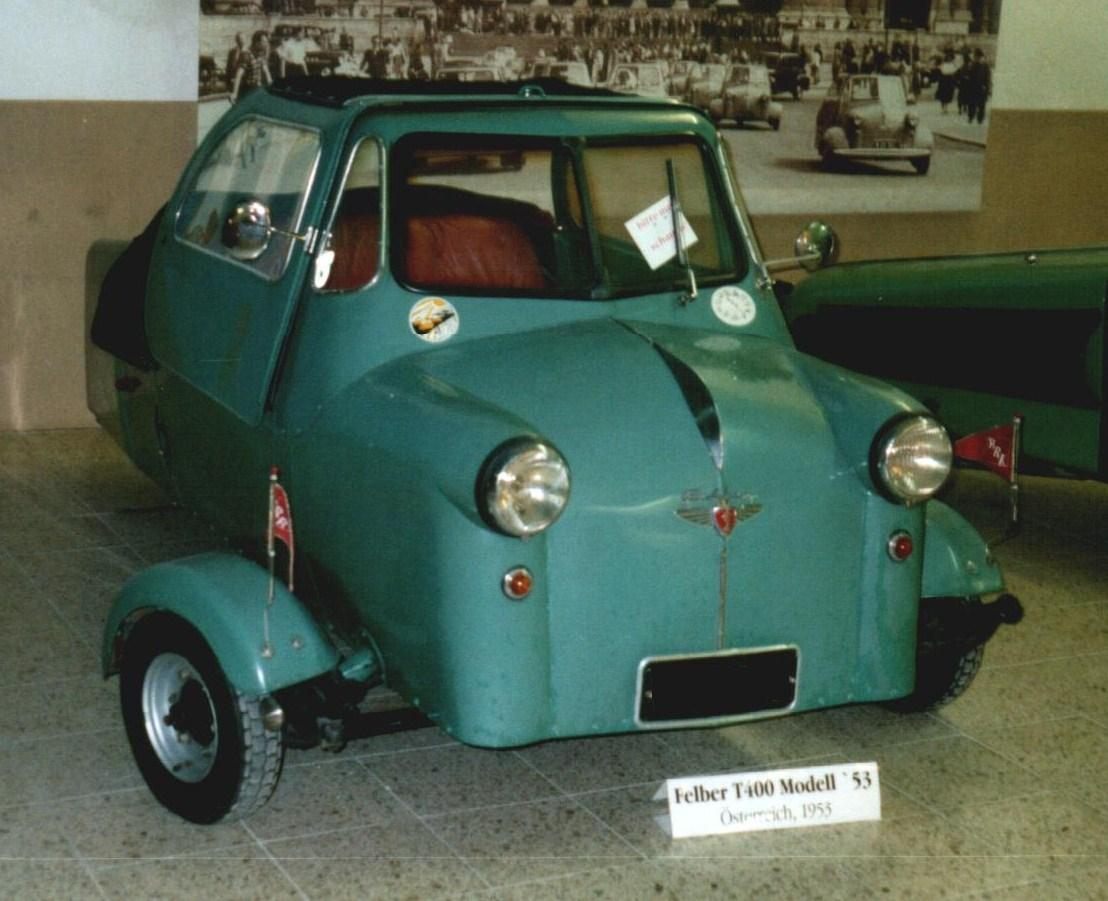
Felber Autoroller, 1953

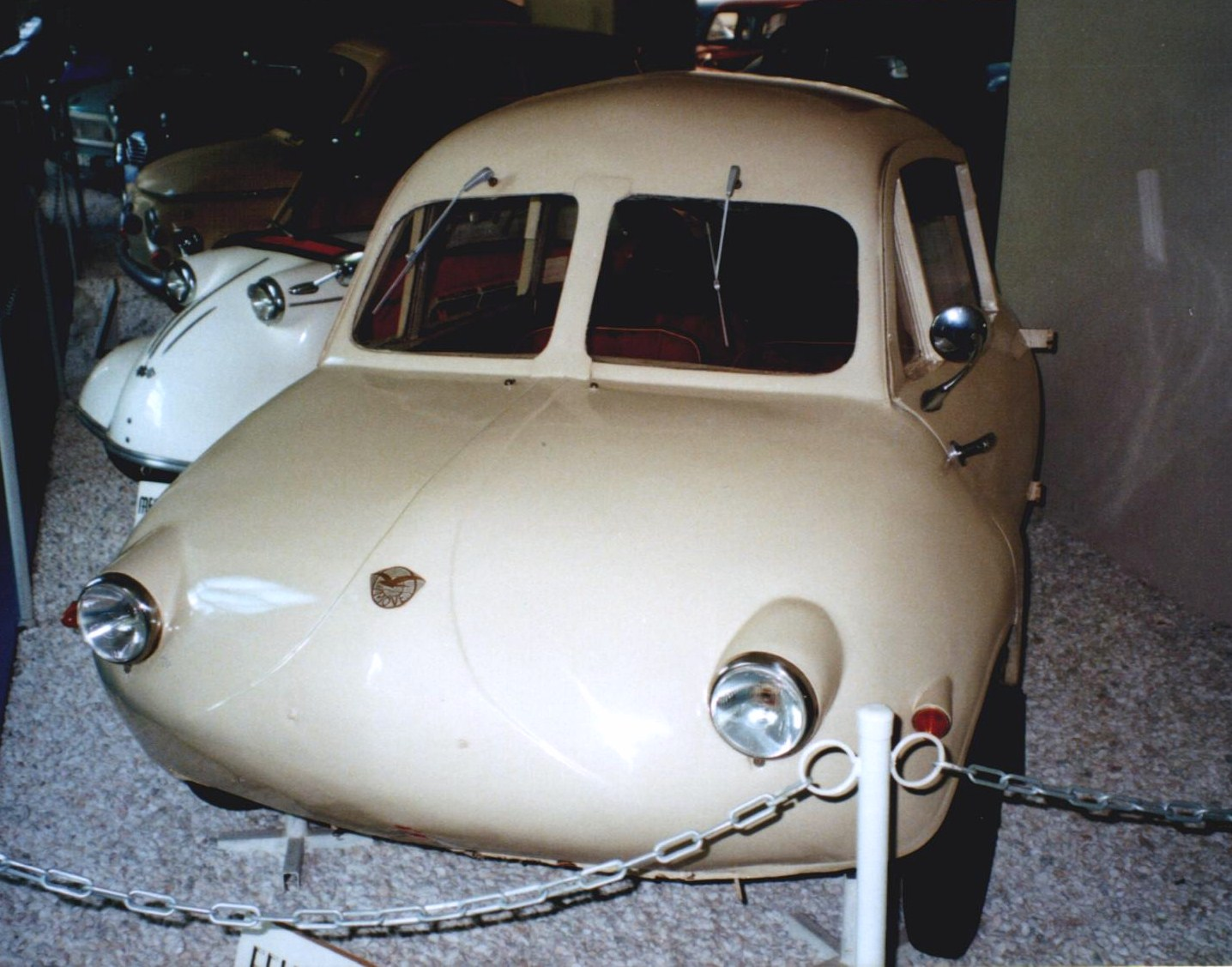
Felber Möve, 1954

== See also ==
- List of microcars by country of origin
