= Buckle Motors =

Australian car dealership chain

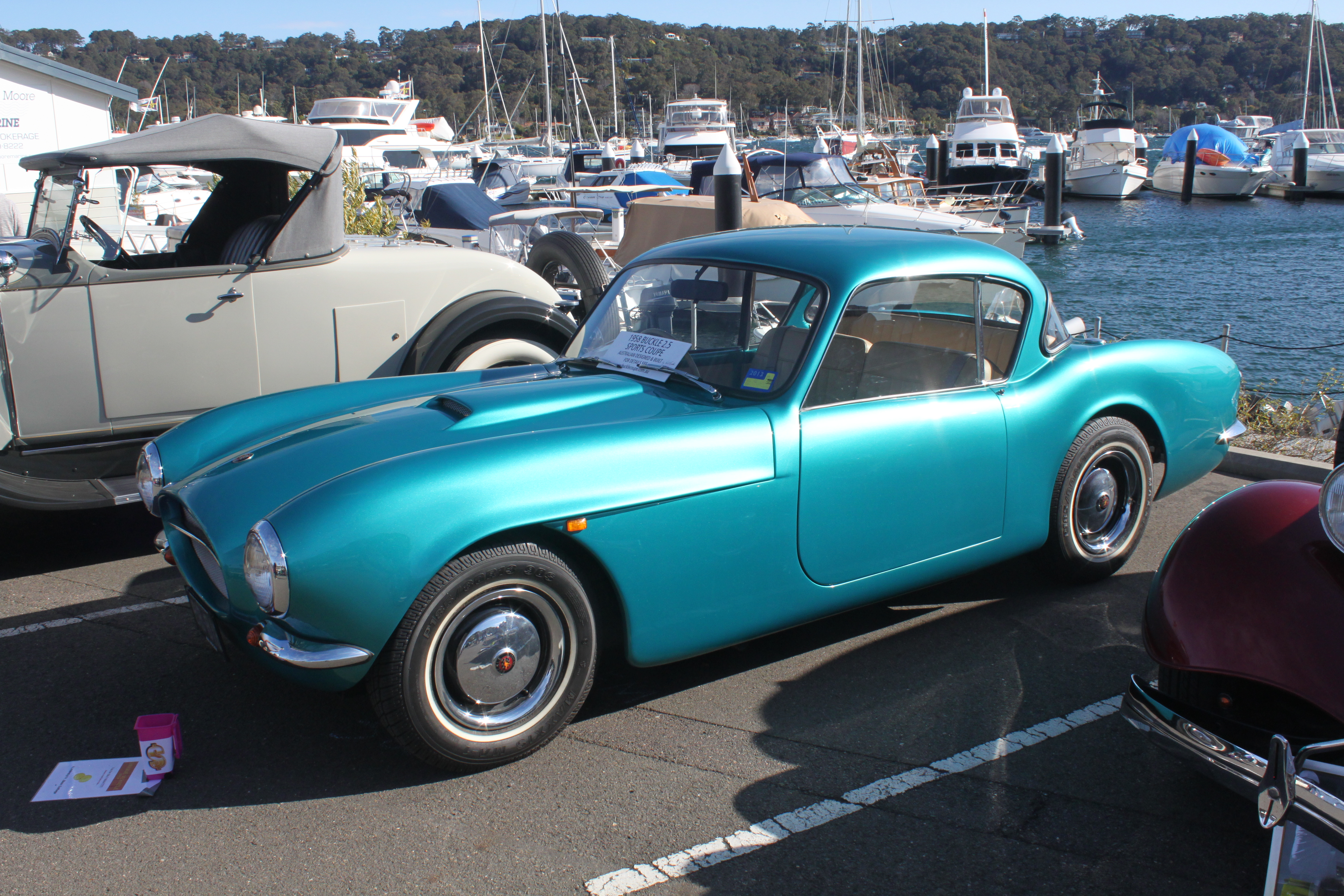
A 1959 Buckle 2.5 Litre

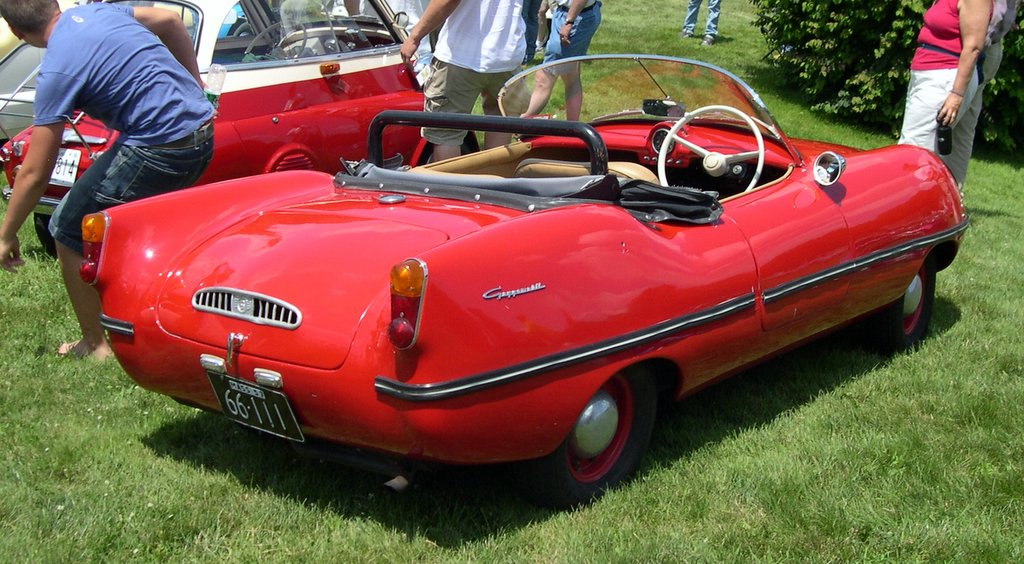
A Goggomobil Dart

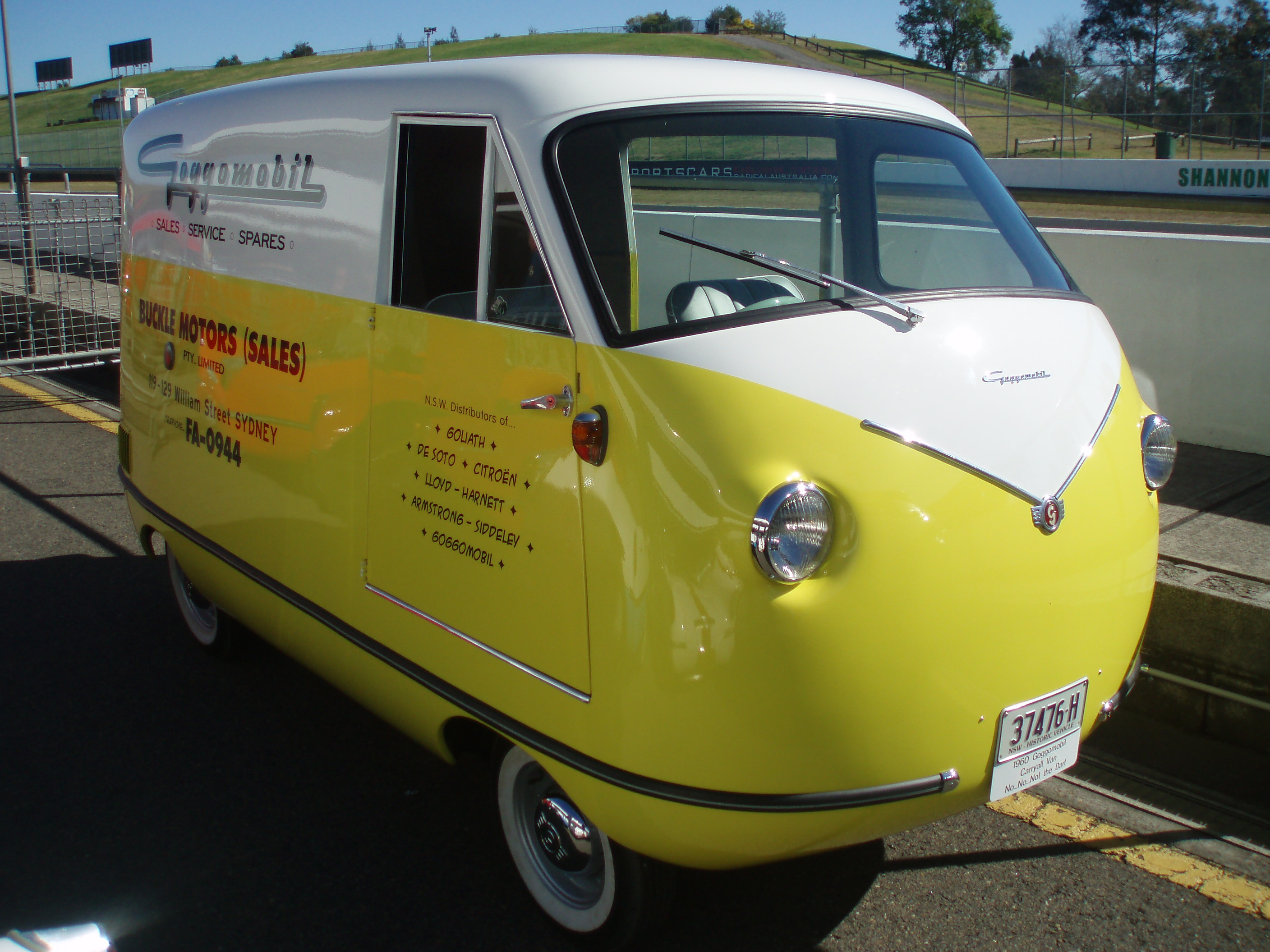
A 1960 Goggomobil Carryall

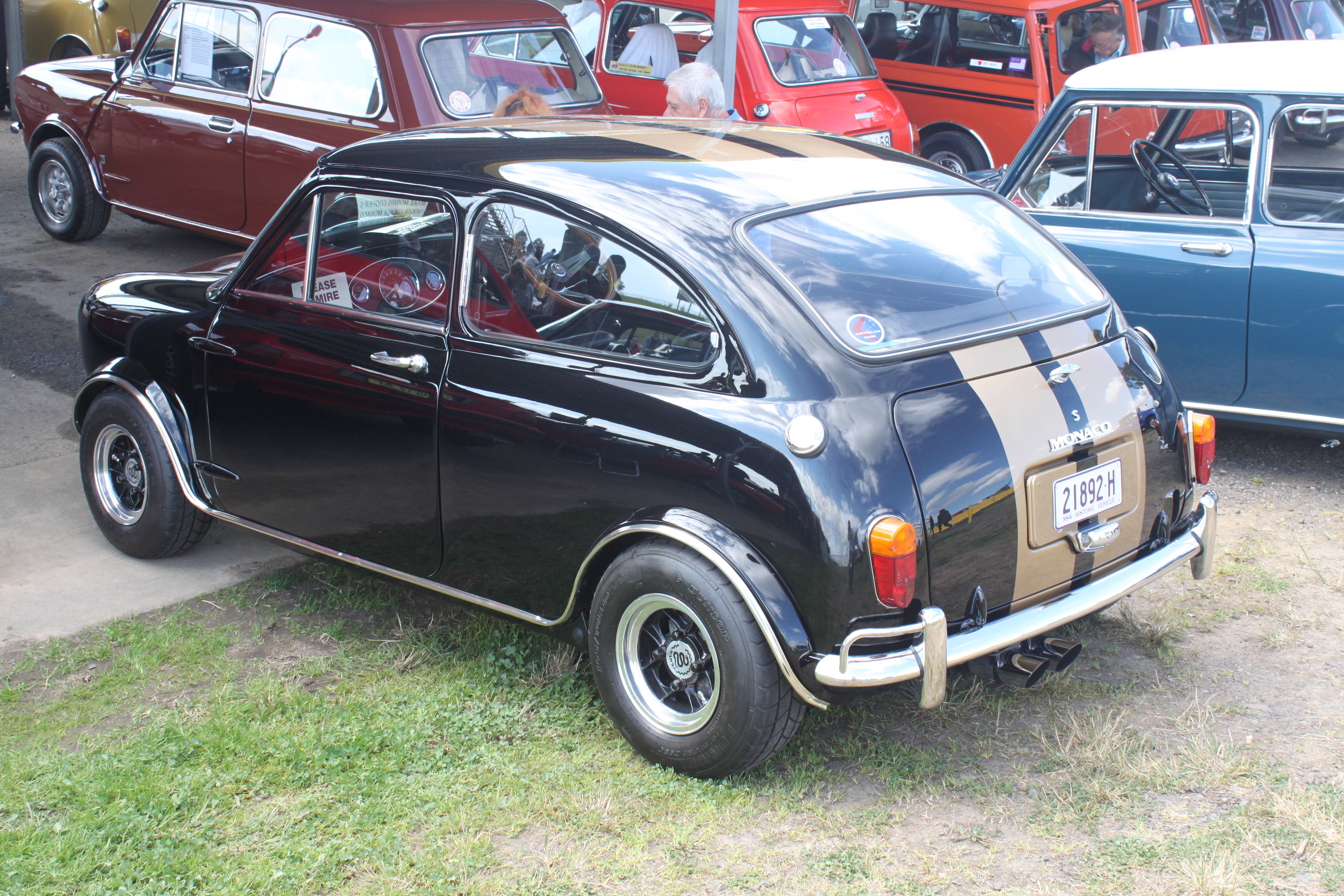
A 1966 Mini Monaco, based on a Mini Cooper S

Buckle Motors Pty Ltd is an Australian car dealership chain and former manufacturer that produced the famous Goggomobil Dart. Currently, under the name Bill Buckle Auto Group, the company sells Toyota, Subaru and Volkswagen vehicles.

== History ==
Buckle Motors was founded in 1927 in Sydney by William "Bill" Buckle Snr. as a Triumph and Talbot dealership on 127 William Street, becoming the sole dealership for those brands in New South Wales at the time. Buckle had worked previously as an Amilcar salesman in Melbourne. The dealership subsequently acquired the New South Wales franchises for Citroën, Armstrong Siddeley and DeSoto. In 1947 Bill Buckle Snr. died causing Bill Buckle Jr. (Note: Bill Buckle Jr. is also referred to as Bill Buckle Snr. as his son is also named William Buckle (there are three William Buckles).) to enter the family business.

In 1952 Bill Buckle Jr. traveled to England and found fibreglass-bodied sports cars being manufactured and a plastic sports car body at the 1953 London Motor Show. Upon his return, Buckle persuaded the company's other directors to construct a unique fibreglass-bodied sports car. With development lasting through 1945 and 1955, a prototype roadster was finally created in mid 1955 using Ford Zephyr components. After testing and minor design changes, the finished vehicle was first manufactured in June 1957 as the Buckle 2.5 Litre in a factory in Punchbowl, New South Wales. The coupe proved successful in racing however only around 25 were made.

In the late 1950s, Buckle realised that Australia's import taxes could be substantially reduced if a chassis was imported instead of a complete vehicle. In 1958 Buckle traveled to Dingolfing, Bavaria to discuss the manufacture of Goggomobil vehicles in Australia with Hans Glas. An agreement was reached in which the chassis, engine and running gear would be imported and the body would be manufactured in Australia at the Punchbowl factory. A few whole vehicles were initially imported to make fibreglass moulds from. The Buckle Goggomobils were almost identical to their German counterparts with the exception of Buckle's fibreglass Goggomobil Transporter equivalent, known as the Carryall, being more rounded. The Carryall actually shared its chassis with the Dart, and uniquely featured a side-mounted rollerdoor as its sole loading door. Thousands of Goggomobils were produced by Buckle Motors. At this time the company also began to sell Borgward, Goliath, Lloyd-Hartnett, Hillman and Humber vehicles.

From 1959 to 1961 Buckle Motors also produced the original fibreglass-bodies Goggomobil Dart two-seater sport car based on the Goggomobil Coupe. Originally doorless with a 293cc engine, later models featured small suicide doors, a hardtop and a 400cc engine. Nowadays the Goggomobil Dart remains as an iconic Australian vehicle

In 1961 Buckle Motors was purchased by Hong Kong investors and in 1963 Bill Buckle created Bill Buckle Auto Conversions, specialising in left-hand-drive to right-hand-drive conversions of American vehicles.

In 1966 Buckle produced the Mini Monaco, converted from standard, Australian-built Morris Minis. Costing $400, the conversion saw the original roof replaced with a lower, sleeker, fibreglass roof which significantly reduced the weight of the vehicle. This lighter, more aerodynamic conversion of the Mini was a total of 4 inches shorter than the standard model. For a further $200 amenities were added to make the interior more luxurious. Around 30 Mini Monacos were converted between 1966 and 1967, with the majority being based on the Mini Cooper S.
