= SMS Möwe =

Three ships of the Imperial German Navy and two of the Austro-Hungarian Navy have been named SMS Möwe:

- SMS Möwe (1859), an Austro-Hungarian gunboat launched in 1859
- SMS Möwe (1879), a German gunboat launched in 1879
- SMS Möwe (1906), a German survey vessel launched in 1906
- SMS Möwe (1907), an Austro-Hungarian Kaiman-class torpedo boat launched in 1907
- SMS Möwe (1914), a German commerce raider during World War I, launched as Pungo in 1914
