= Goggomobil Dart =

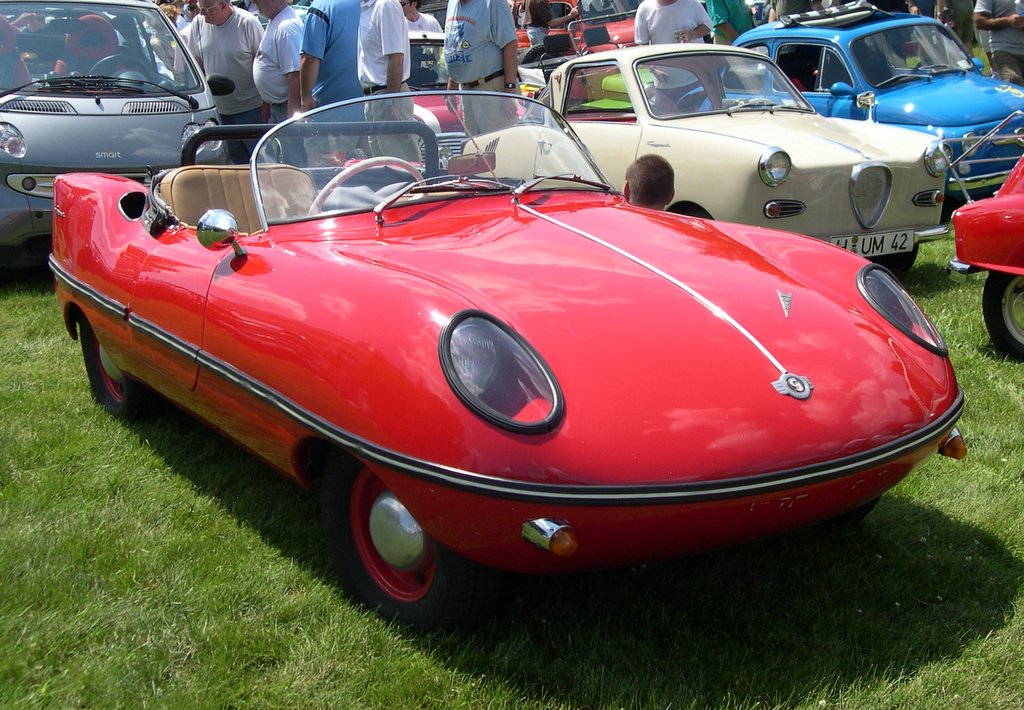

Overview
- Manufacturer: Buckle Motors Pty Ltd.
- Production: 1959–September 1961
- Assembly: Australia: Sydney, New South Wales
- Designer: Bill Buckle

Body and chassis
- Class: Microcar
- Body style: 0-door roadster
- Layout: Rear-engine, rear-wheel-drive
- Platform: Goggomobil

Powertrain
- Engine: Two-stroke straight-twin engine Standard: 293 cc, 14.8 PS (10.9 kW); Optional: 392 cc, 18.5 PS (13.6 kW)
- Transmission: 4-speed manual

Dimensions
- Wheelbase: 1,800 mm (71 in)
- Length: 3,050 mm (120 in)
- Width: 1,370 mm (54 in)
- Kerb weight: 380 kg (840 lb)

The Goggomobil Dart is a microcar roadster which was developed in Australia by Sydney company Buckle Motors Pty Ltd. and produced from 1959 to 1961.

== History ==
The Dart was based on the chassis and mechanical components of the German Goggomobil microcar, which was a product of Hans Glas GmbH of Dingolfing, in Bavaria, Germany. The car featured an Australian-designed fibreglass two-seater open sports car body without doors, with the whole package weighing in at only 345 kg (761 lb). It was powered by a rear-mounted twin-cylinder two-stroke motor available in both 300 cc and 400 cc variants, and had a small luggage compartment built into the nose. The Dart was designed in 1958 and went on sale the following year, with around 700 examples produced up to the time that production ceased in September 1961.

== Production specifics ==
The Dart came standard with Goggomobil’s 293cc parallel twin (producing 15 hp and 20 ft.lb.), but their 392cc unit (20 hp/24 ft.lb.) soon became available as an option. Top speed was approximately 60 mph (97 km/h) for the 293cc cars, and about 65 mph (104 km/h) for those equipped with the 392cc engine. There may only by 50 of them left currently. Dimensions were 3.0m long and 1.3m wide.

== In popular culture ==
The Goggomobil Dart is mentioned in a 1990s Australian Yellow Pages television advertisement in which the actor Tommy Dysart says the famous line "G, O, G, G, O... No! No! Not the dart!" In the early 2000s he continued his Goggomobil persona advertising Shannons Insurance, where he plays a character who is especially interested in finding the best car insurance for his treasured Goggomobil Dart.

A documentary, released on 8 September 2019 titled D'art, is about an artist who paints paper planes (paper darts) on the Goggomobil Dart as the canvas. The movie was received with positive reviews and was selected in 2020 for the Melbourne Documentary Film Festival.

== Gallery ==
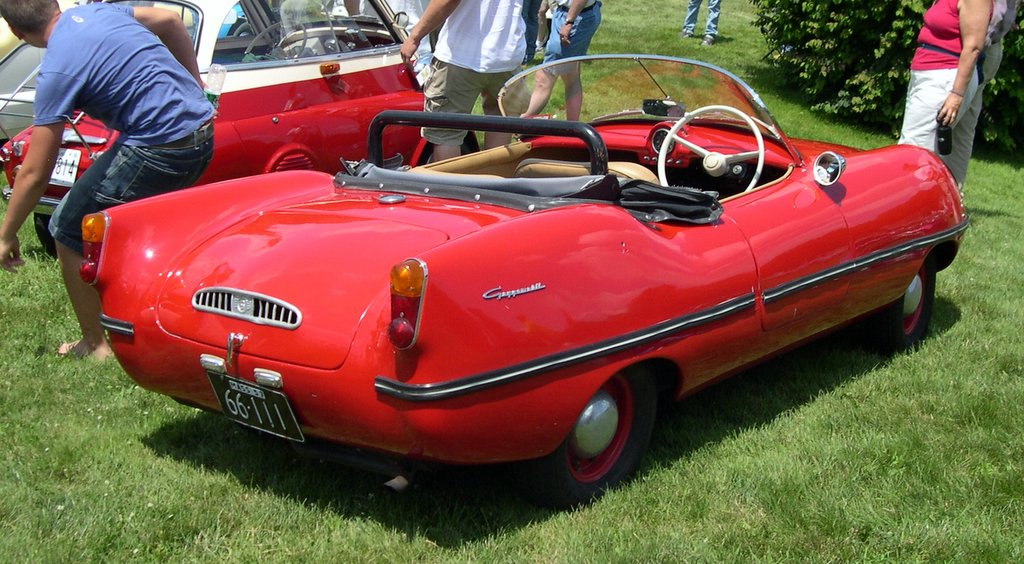
Goggomobile Dart rear

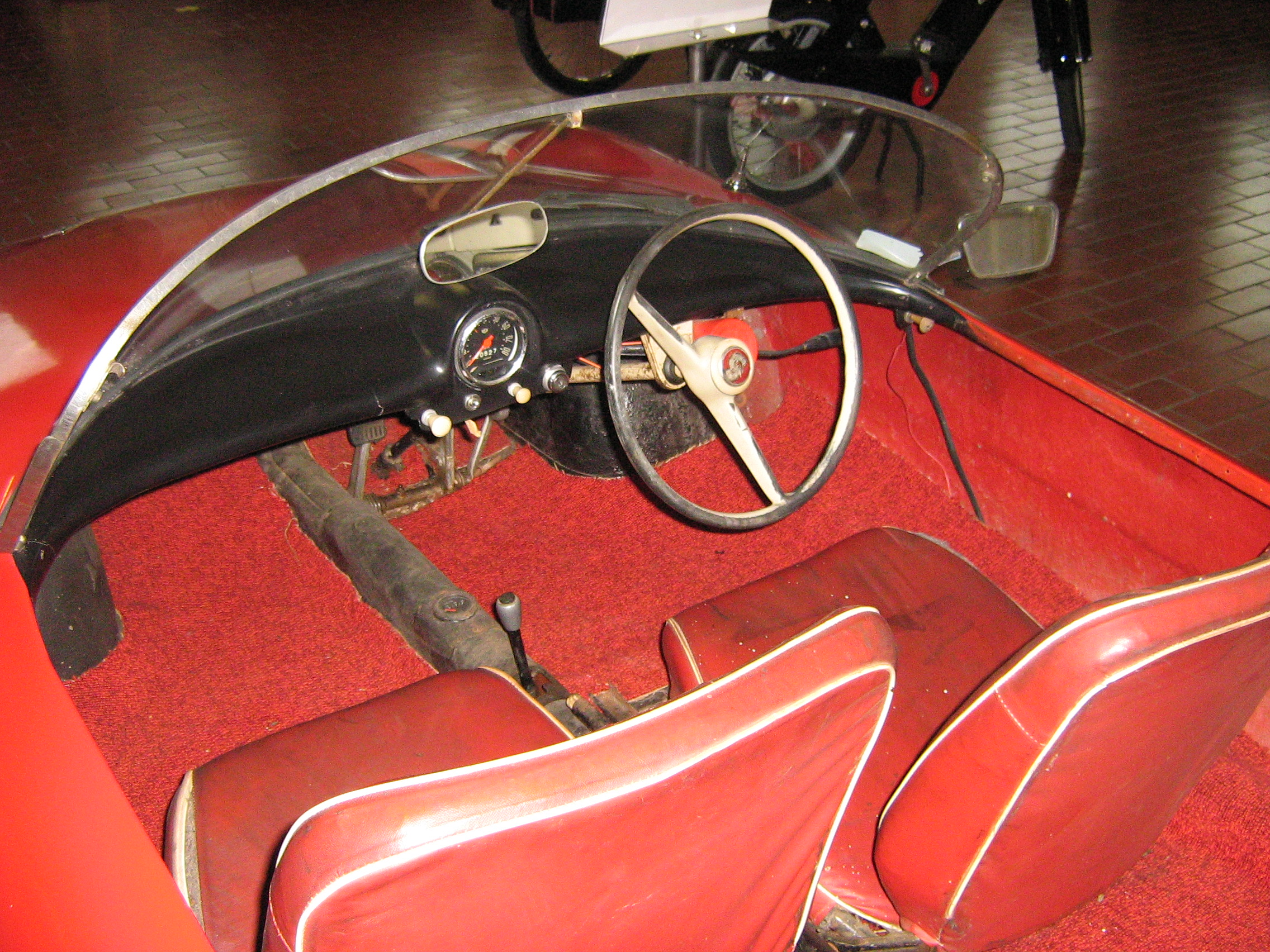
Interior

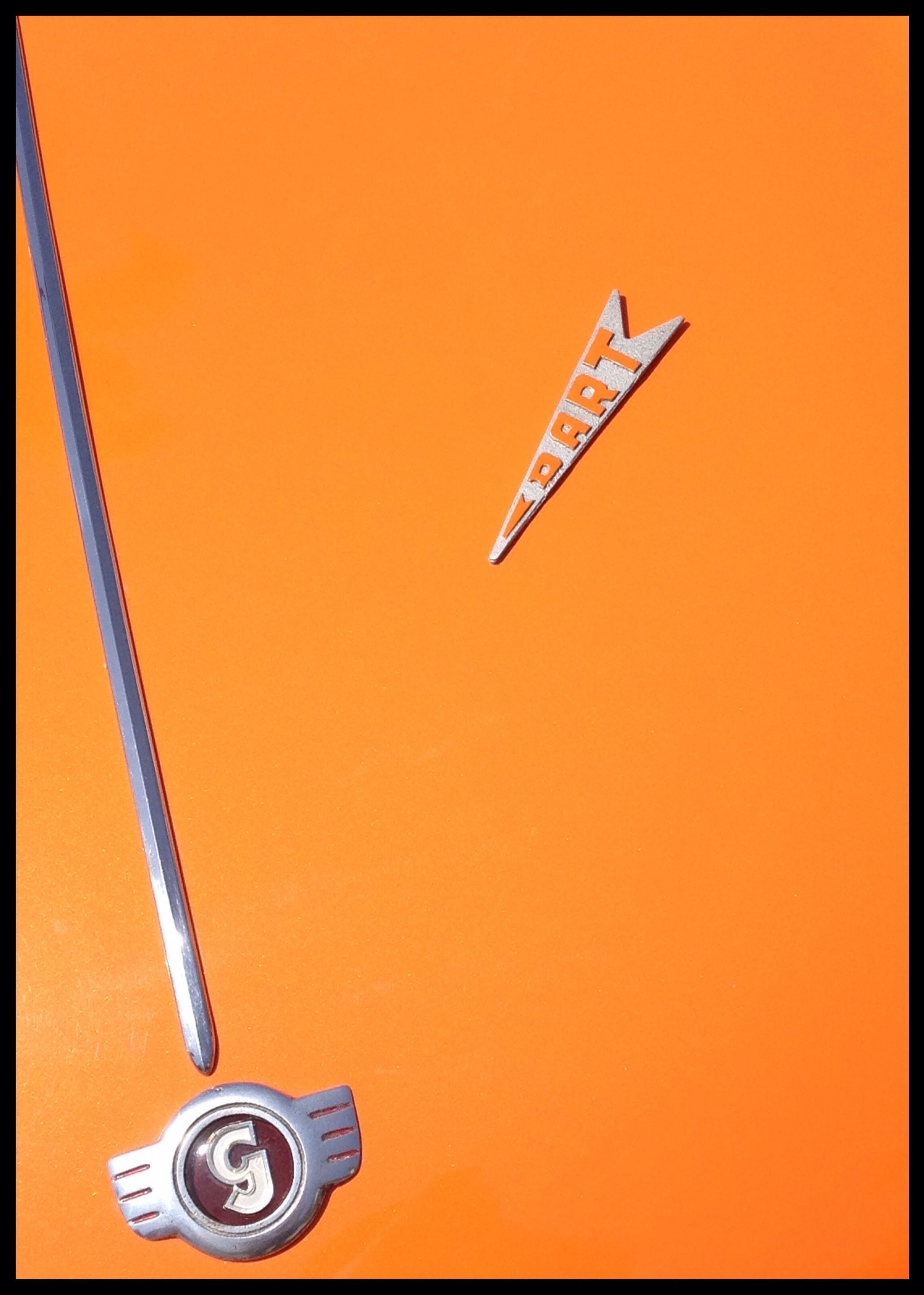
Badging
