= Möve 101 =

1953 Austrian-built microcar

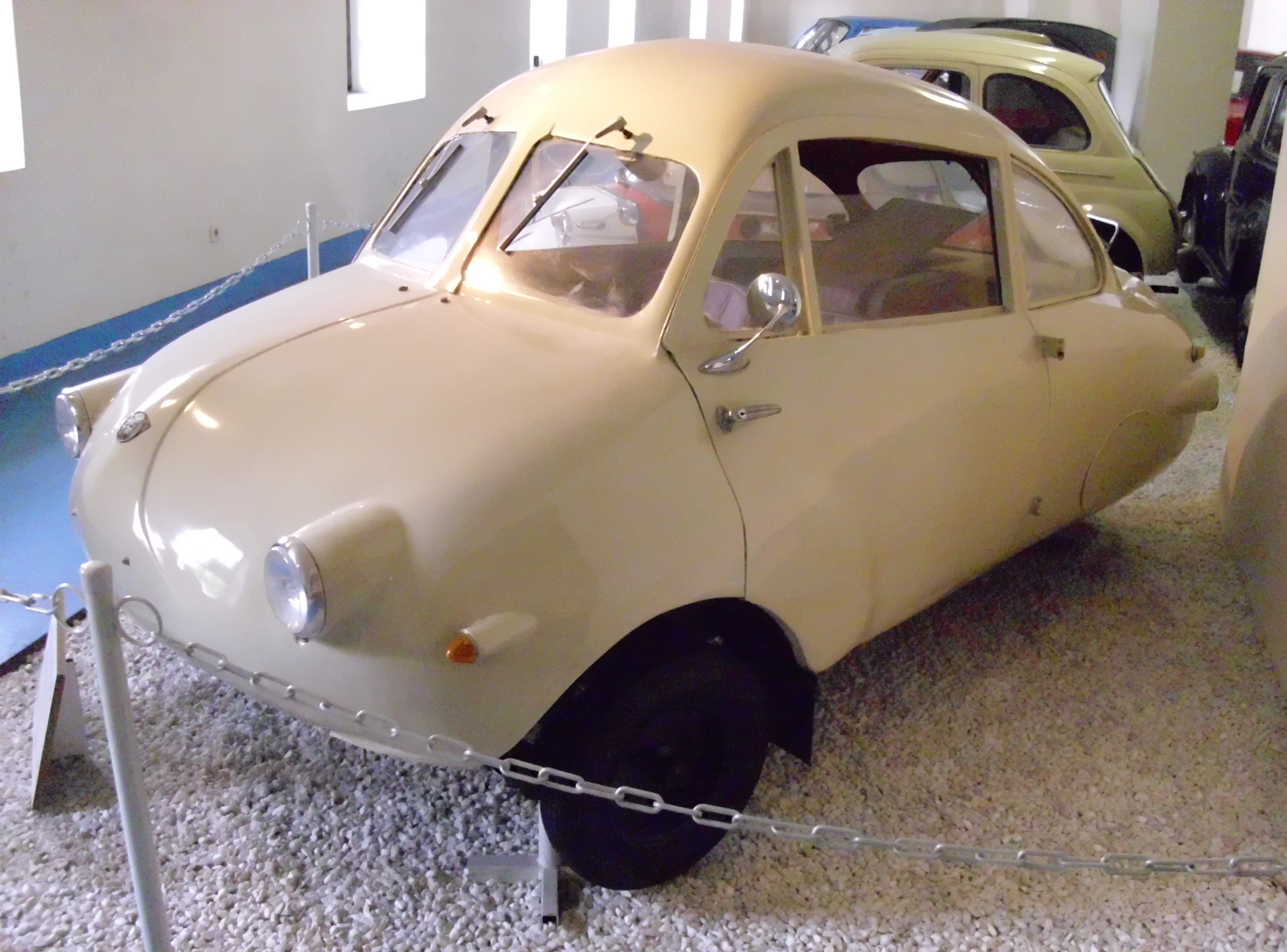
1954 Felber Möve

The Möve 101 was a microcar with egg-shaped coupé bodywork based on a Felber Autoroller chassis. Ten cars were built in Vienna by a specialist coachbuilding company Hofmann & Moldrich in 1953. Though the fully enclosed bodywork made from 0.8 mm aluminium plate was more sophisticated than that of the Felber, the car proved more expensive to produce and the heavier bodywork reduced performance and made the car less stable. Möve translates into English as Gull. The only known survivor is in the Automobilmuseum Aspang/Wechsel in Austria.

== See also ==
- List of microcars by country of origin
