= Goggomobil =

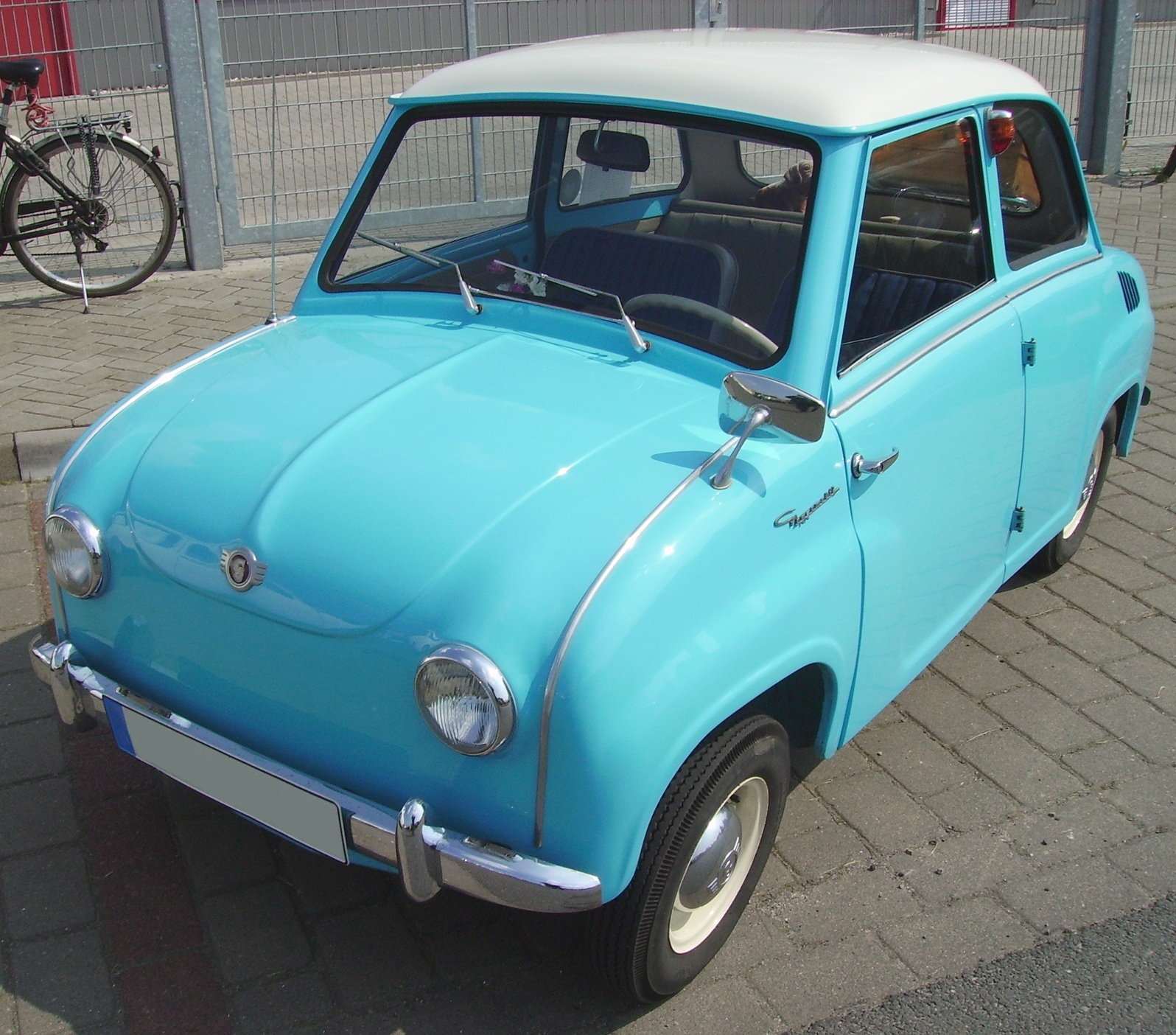

Overview
- Manufacturer: Hans Glas GmbH (1955–1966); BMW (1966–1969)
- Production: 1955–30 June 1969
- Assembly: West Germany: Dingolfing; Buckle Motors, Sydney

Body and chassis
- Class: Microcar
- Layout: RR layout
- Body styles: 2-door sedan 2-door coupe 2-door convertible Van; Pickup; Roadster (Goggomobil Dart)
- Vehicles: Goggomobil T (2-door sedan); Goggomobil TS (2-door coupe); Goggomobil TL (van); Goggomobil Dart (roadster)

Powertrain
- Engines: Two-stroke straight-twin engine 245 cc, 13.6 hp (10.1 kW) (DIN); 293 cc, 14.8 hp (11 kW) (DIN); 392 cc, 18.5 hp (13.8 kW) (DIN)
- Transmissions: 4-speed manual electromagnetic pre-selector transmission optional

Dimensions
- Wheelbase: 1,800 mm (70.9 in)
- Length: 2-door sedan: 2,900 mm (114.2 in); 2-door coupe: 3,035 mm (119.5 in); Van: 2,910 mm (114.6 in)
- Width: 2-door sedan: 1,260 mm (49.6 in); 2-door coupe: 1,370 mm (53.9 in); Van: 1,316 mm (51.8 in)
- Height: 2-door sedan: 1,310 mm (51.6 in); 2-door coupe: 1,235 mm (48.6 in); Van: 1,695 mm (66.7 in)

Goggomobil was a series of microcars produced by Hans Glas in the Bavarian town of Dingolfing between 1955 and 1969.

Glas produced three models on the Goggomobil platform: the Goggomobil T sedan, the Goggomobil TS coupe, and the Goggomobil TL van. The engine was an air-cooled, two-stroke, two-cylinder unit originally displacing 250 cc, but later available in increased sizes of 300 cc and 400 cc. It had an electric pre-selective transmission built by Getrag and a manual clutch. The engine was behind the rear wheels. Suspension was independent all round using coil springs with swing axles.

214,313 sedans, 66,511 coupés, and 3,667 Transporter vans and pickups were built from 1955 to 1969.

== T sedan ==
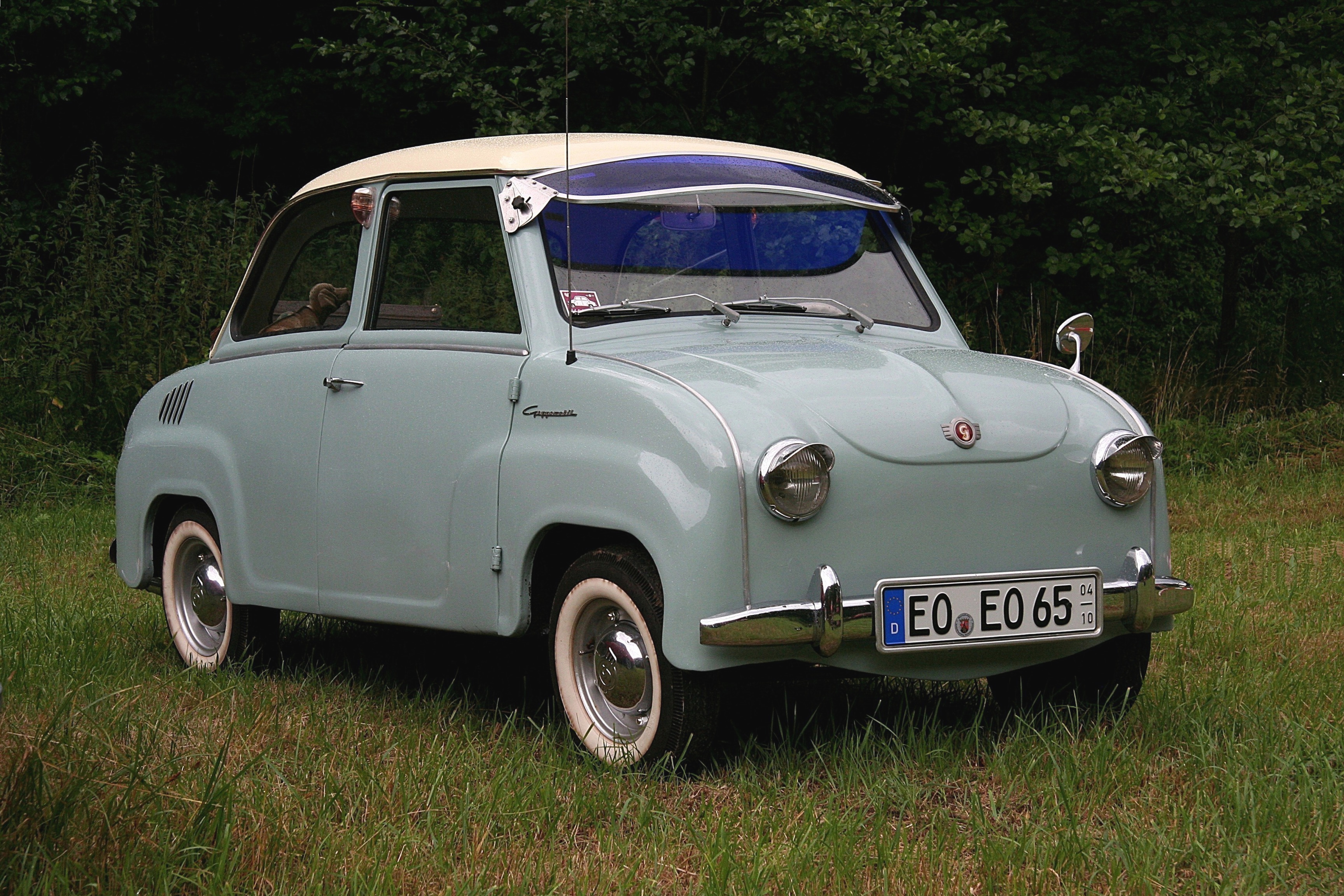
Goggomobil T250 with wind-up windows

The Goggomobil T250 was introduced by Glas at the 1954 IFMA international bicycle and motorcycle show. The T250 was a conventional-looking two door sedan with a rear-mounted 245 cc air-cooled two-stroke straight twin engine.

Design changes were made to the T250 in 1957. Two windshield wipers were used instead of the earlier single wiper, and the sliding windows in the doors were changed to wind-up windows. Also, at this time the T300 and T400 became available; these had larger engines of 300 cc and 400 cc capacity respectively.

The last design change for the T sedan came in 1964, when the rear-hinged suicide doors were replaced by conventional front-hinged doors.

214,313 sedans were built before production ended on 30 June 1969.

== TS coupe ==
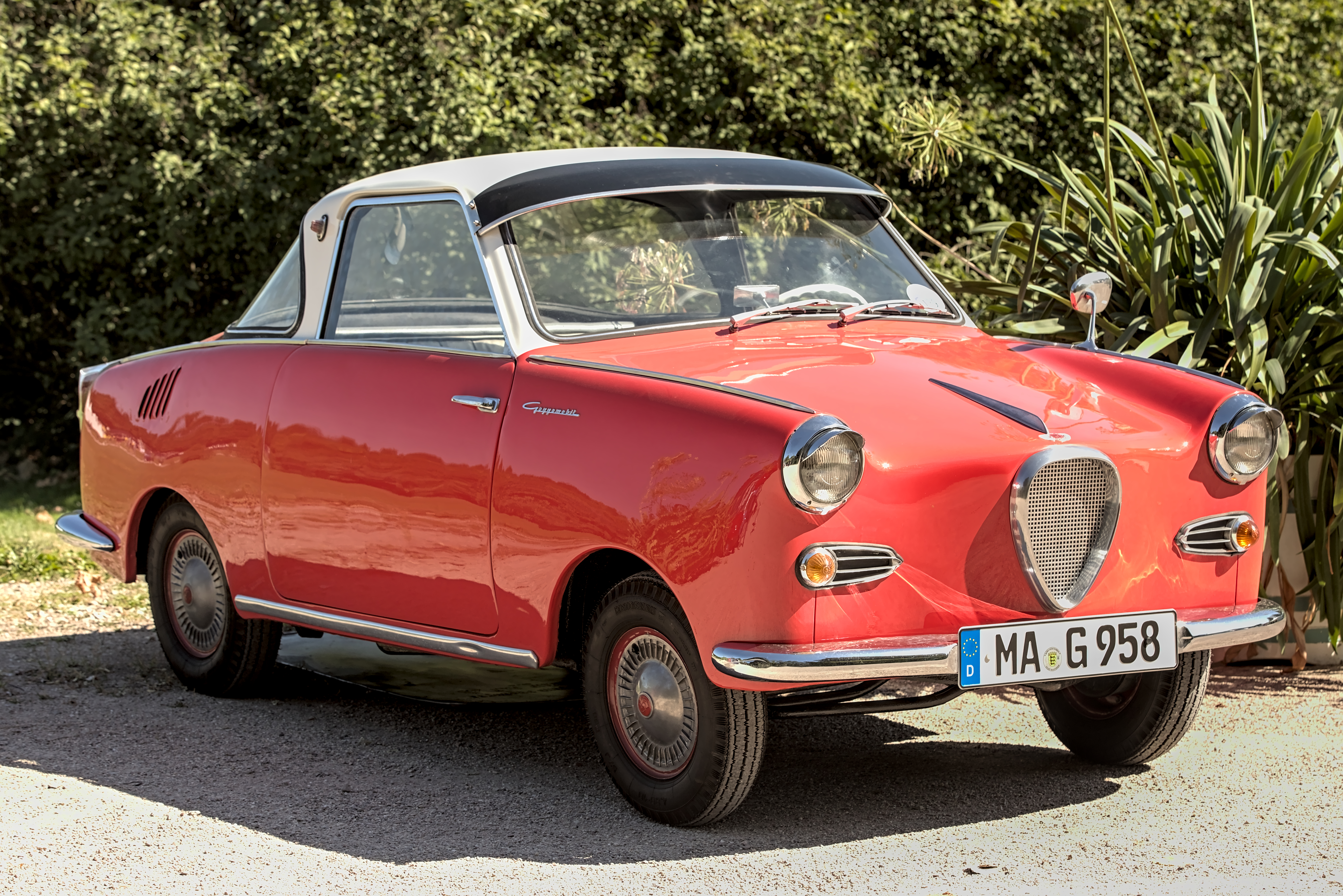
TS 250 Coupe

The Goggomobil TS 2+2 coupe was introduced at the 1957 IFMA show alongside the improved T sedan. It was available as the TS250, the TS300, and the TS400, the number reflecting the approximate engine size in cubic centimeters.

The only major design change to the TS coupe was the change from rear-hinged suicide doors to front-hinged conventional doors in 1964.

The TS coupe was always ten to twenty percent more expensive than the T sedan. Total production of TS coupes was 66,511.

=== TS 300 specifications and performance ===
The specifications of a 1957 Goggomobil TS 300 Coupe are:

- Configuration — Glas 2-stroke rear engine, 298 cc displacement
- Engine — 2-cylinder, 2 stroke, air-cooled, 58 x 56 mm. bore and stroke, 6.0:1 compression, 15 hp (11 kW) at 5,000 rpm, 17.4 lb⋅ft (24 N⋅m) torque.
- Transmission — 4 speed plus reverse (with electric pre-selector as an available option).
- Top speed — 85 km/h (53 mph)
- Tires — 4.80 x 10 inch.
- Weight — 420 kg (926 lb).
- Wheelbase — 71 in (1,800 mm)
- Height - 49 in (1,200 mm)
- Length - 114.5 in (2,910 mm)
- Width - 53 in (1,300 mm)

A TS300 coupé tested by the British magazine The Motor in 1957 had a top speed of 59.2 mph (95.3 km/h) and could accelerate from 0 to 50 mph (80 km/h) in 27.9 seconds. A fuel consumption of 50.5 miles per imperial gallon (5.59 L/100 km; 42.1 mpg_{‑US}) was recorded. The test car cost £625 including taxes of £209 on the UK market.

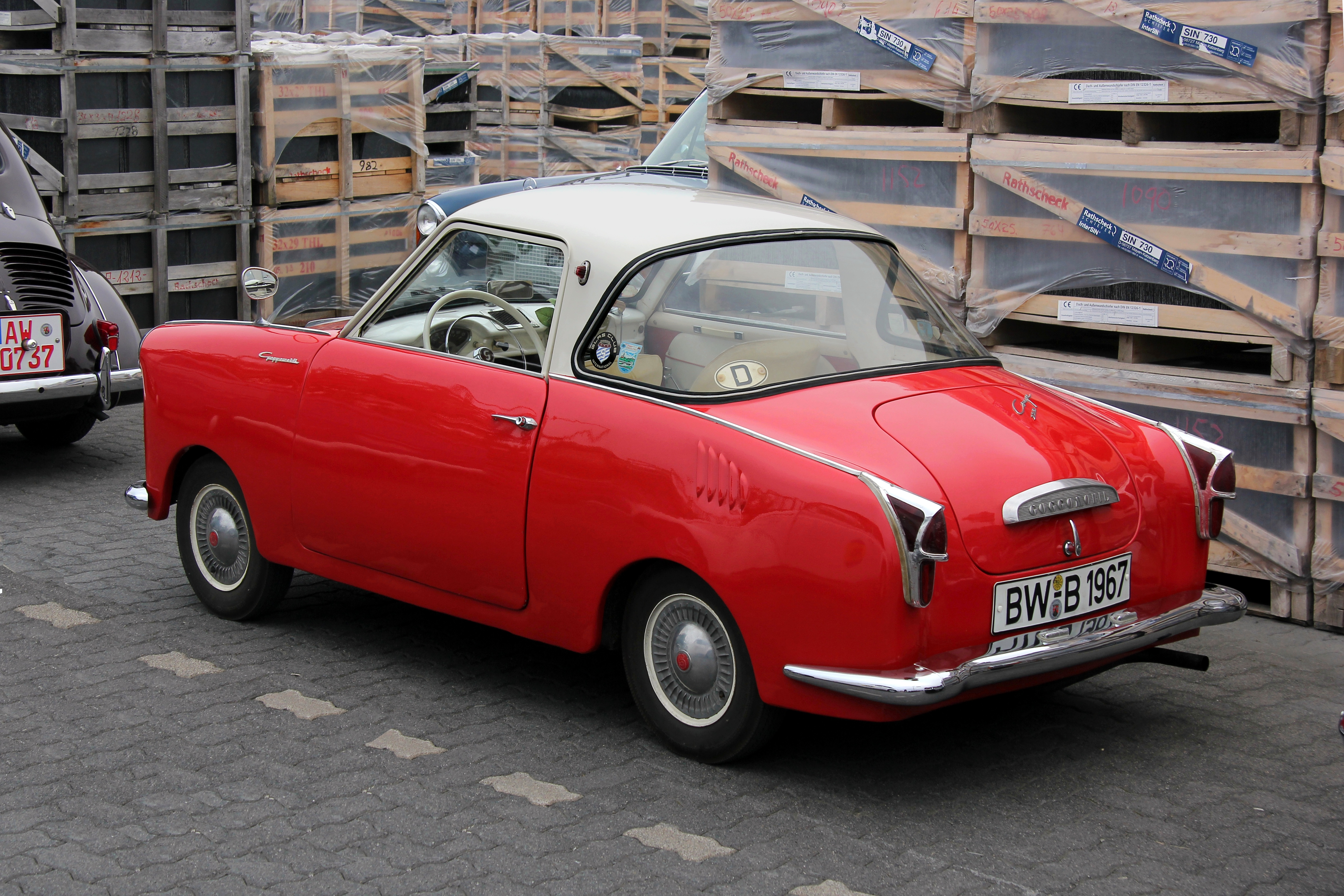
Goggomobil Coupé

=== TS 250 specifications ===
The specifications of a 1958 Goggomobil TS 250 Coupe are:

- Configuration — Glas 2-stroke rear engine, 247 cc displacement
- Engine — 2-cylinder, 2 stroke, air-cooled, 13.6 hp (10.1 kW) at 5,000 rpm
- Transmission — 4 speed plus reverse
- Top speed — 75 km/h (47 mph)
- Tires — 4.40 x 10 inch
- Weight — 415 kg (915 lb)

== Transporter TL van ==
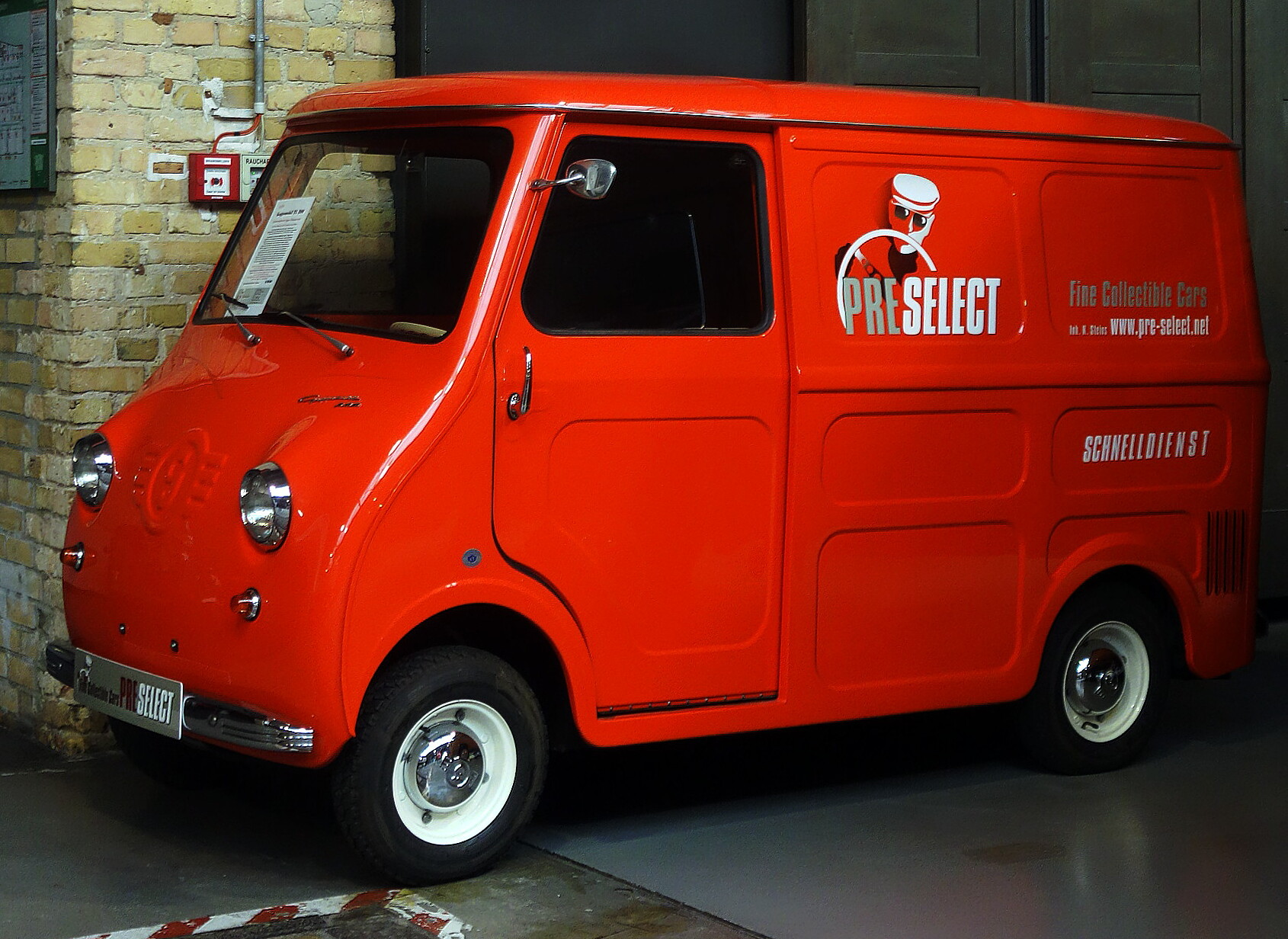
Goggomobil Transporter van

The Goggomobil Transporter, or Goggomobil TL, was introduced at the 1956 IFMA show. The Transporter was built largely at the request of the German Federal Postal Service, which procured more than 2,000 Transporters between October 1957 and November 1965.

The Transporter had sliding front doors. It was available as an enclosed van with double back doors or as a pickup with a tailgate to the open bed. Transporter pickups were often used by municipal services as snowplows or street sweepers.

3,667 Transporter vans and pickups were produced.

== US export editions ==
Goggomobils were exported to the United States. These were special export versions, with the 400 cc engine, an automatic gasoline-oil mixer, and 7-inch (180 mm) sealed-beam headlights as required by US regulations.

== Dart ==
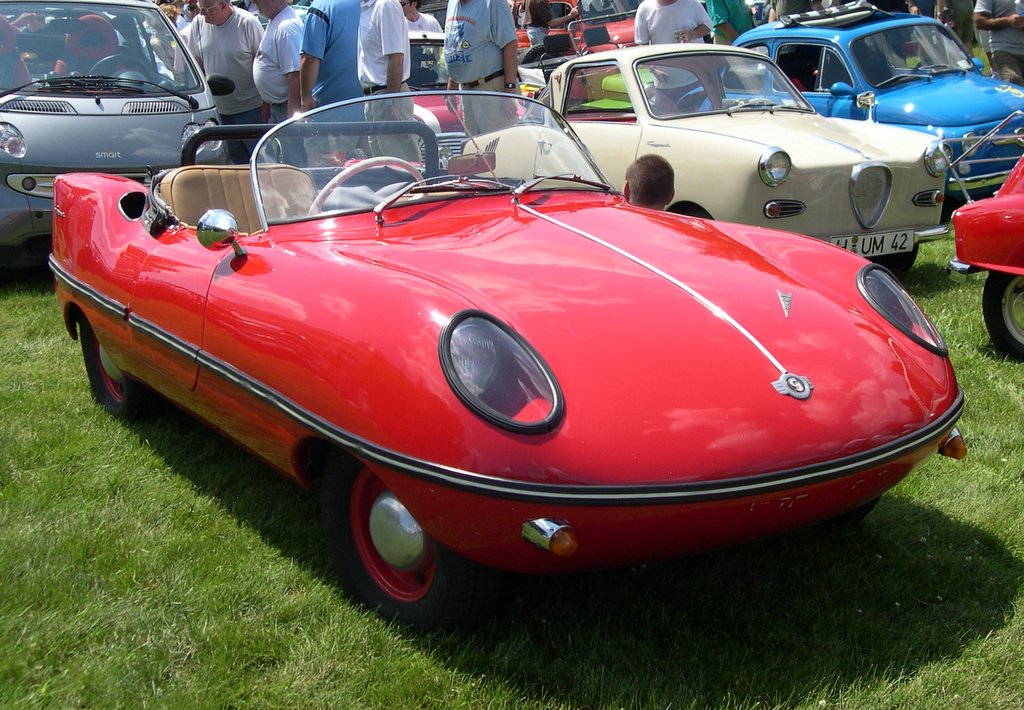
Goggomobil Dart

Between 1957 and 1961, some 700 sports cars called Goggomobil Darts were produced by Buckle Motors Pty Ltd in Sydney, Australia. Other Goggomobil models were also produced under licence, including saloon, coupe, coupe-convertible and light van variants. These were fitted with Australian-produced fibreglass bodies in place of the steel bodies of their German counterparts. Australian production totalled approximately 5,000 units.

The Goggomobil reentered the Australian consciousness in the 1990s when it featured in a widely-quoted advertisement for the Yellow Pages telephone directory. A man (actor Tommy Dysart) was calling many workshops looking for parts for his Goggomobil, with most people hanging up thinking it is a prank call. To one, he patiently spells out G-o-g-g-o in a broad Scottish accent. When one finally recognizes the make, he says excitedly "Not the Dart" and turns to his wife and says "They always think it's the Dart", as if the term Goggomobil itself had been widely recognized.

In 2019 a documentary featuring the Dart was released, called "D'art" by Karl von Möller.

== Sources ==
- Taschen, Benedikt. Kleinwagen, Small Cars, Petites Voitures, 1994.
