= Automotive industry in Germany =

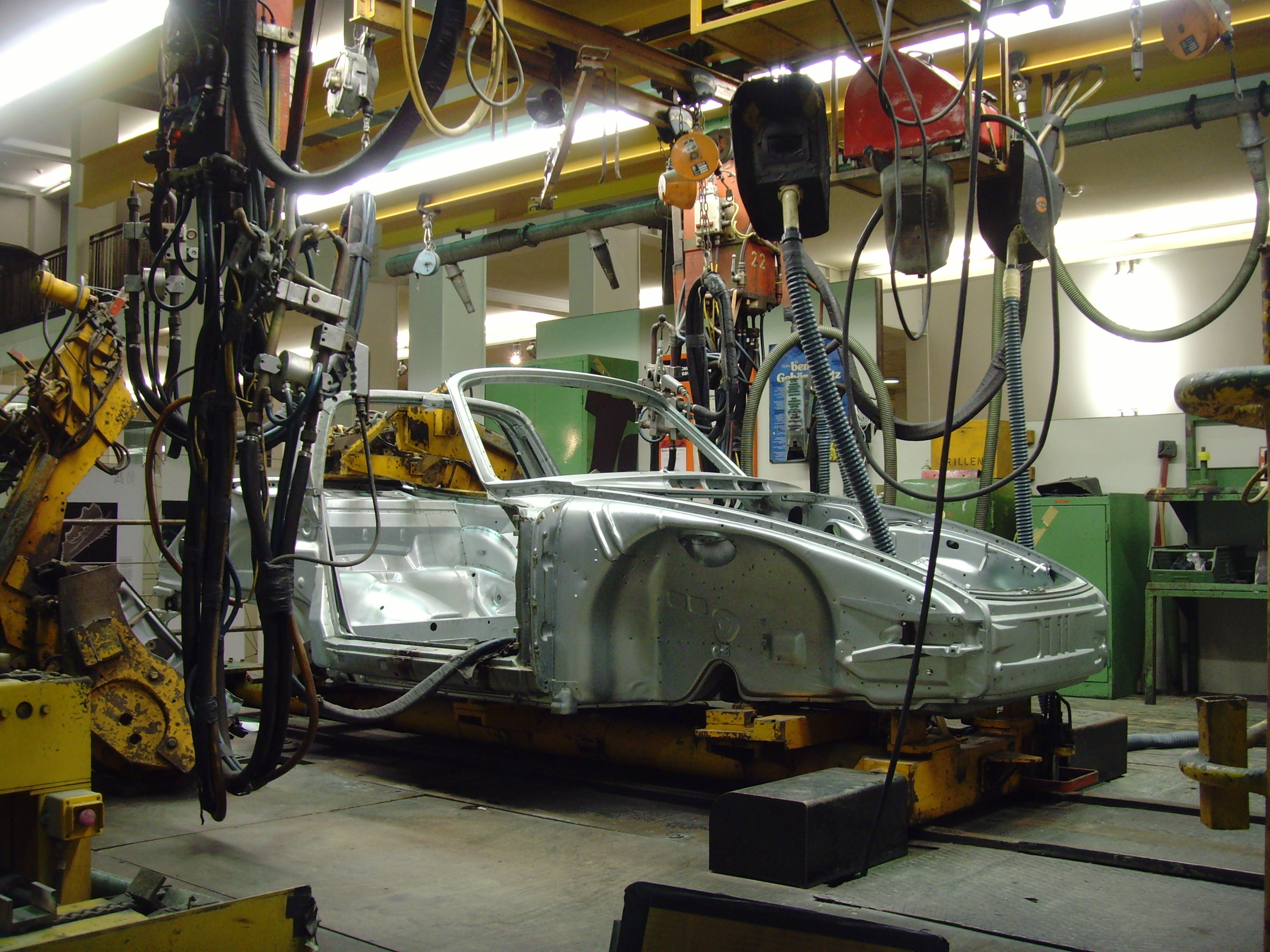
Porsche 911 assembly, Mannheim state museum of technology and labour, 2008

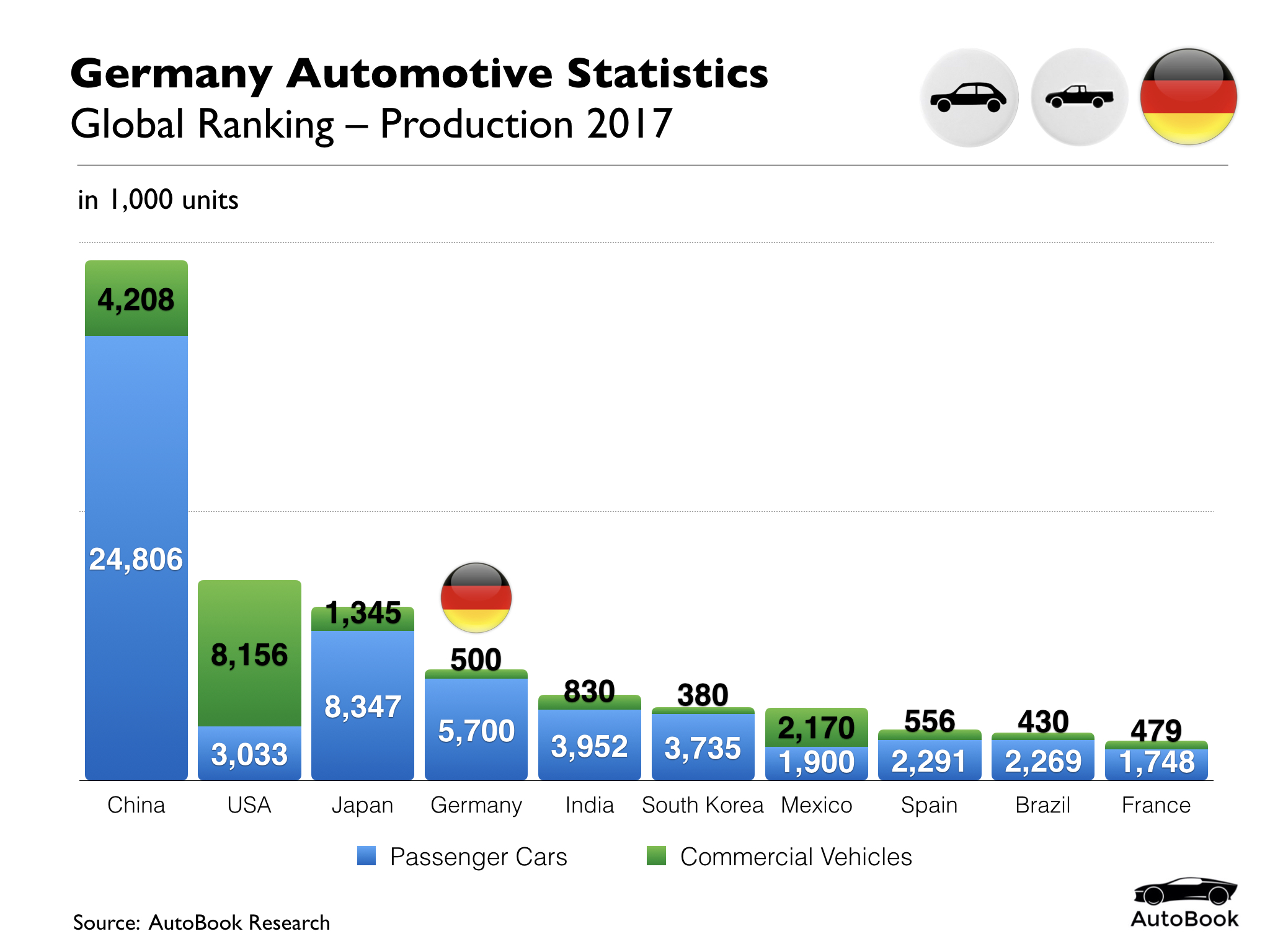
German automotive production as of 2017

The automotive industry in Germany is one of the largest employers in the country, with a labor force of over 857,336 (2016) working in the industry.

Being home to the modern car, the German automobile industry is regarded as one of the most competitive and innovative in the world, and has the third-highest car production in the world, and seventh-highest total motor vehicle production. With an annual output close to four million and a 31.5% share of the European Union (2017), German-designed cars won in the European Car of the Year, the International Car of the Year, and the World Car of the Year annual awards the most times among all countries. The Volkswagen Beetle and Porsche 911 took 4th and 5th places in the Car of the Century award.

== History ==
=== Early history ===
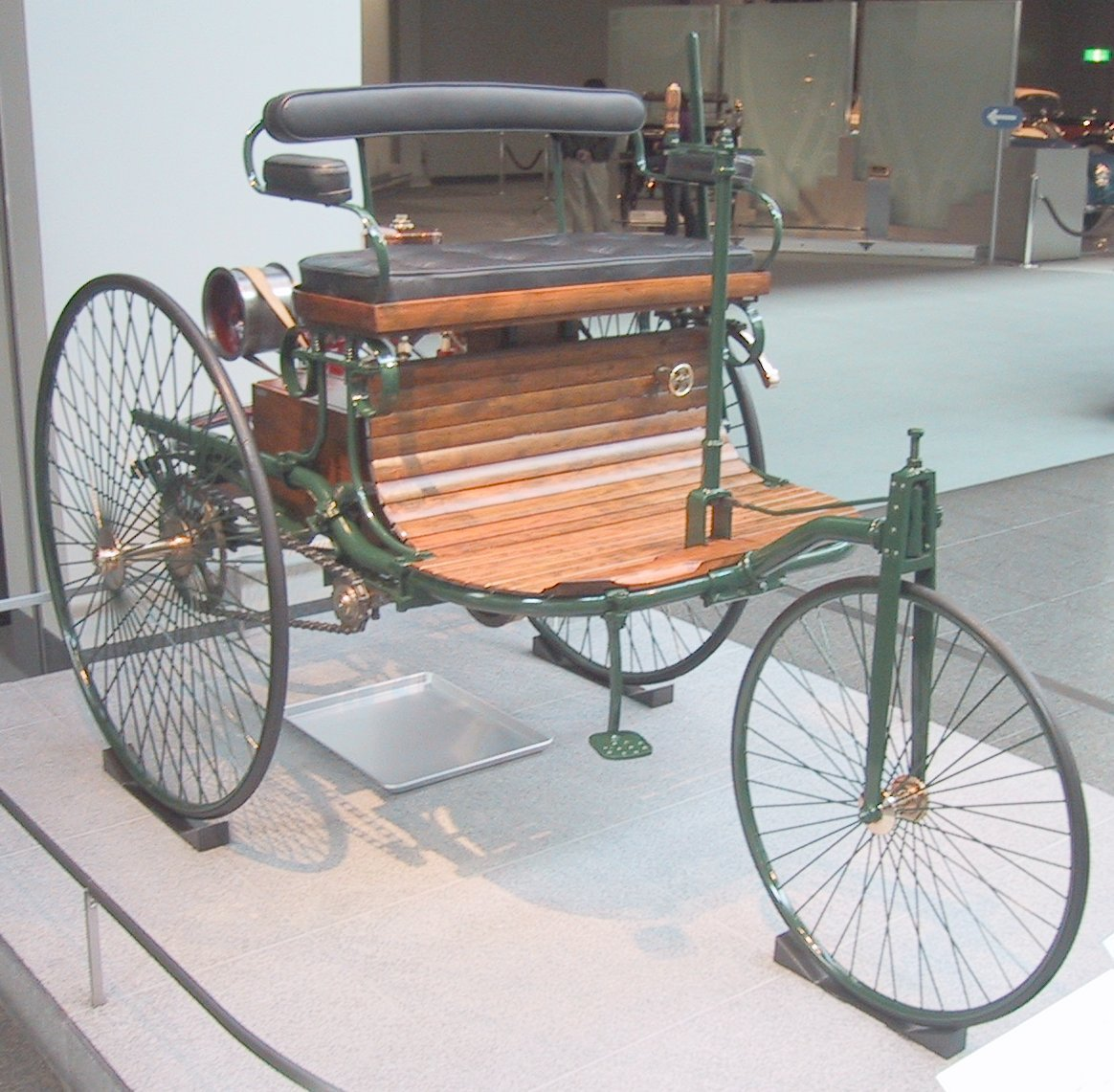
Karl Benz's 1885 Patent Motorwagen (replica). It is considered the world's first I.C.E.-driven car to be series-produced.

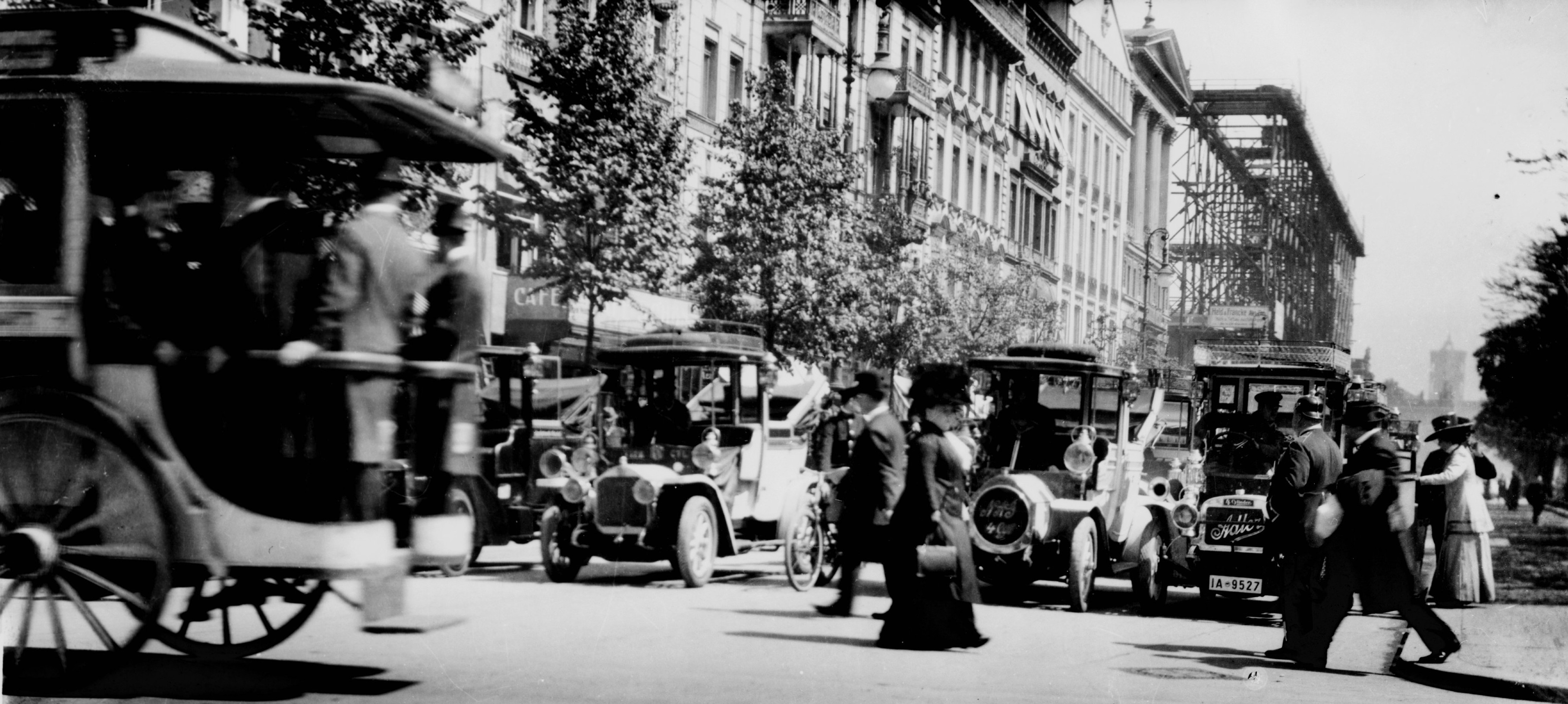
Berlin traffic in 1913, including an Adler

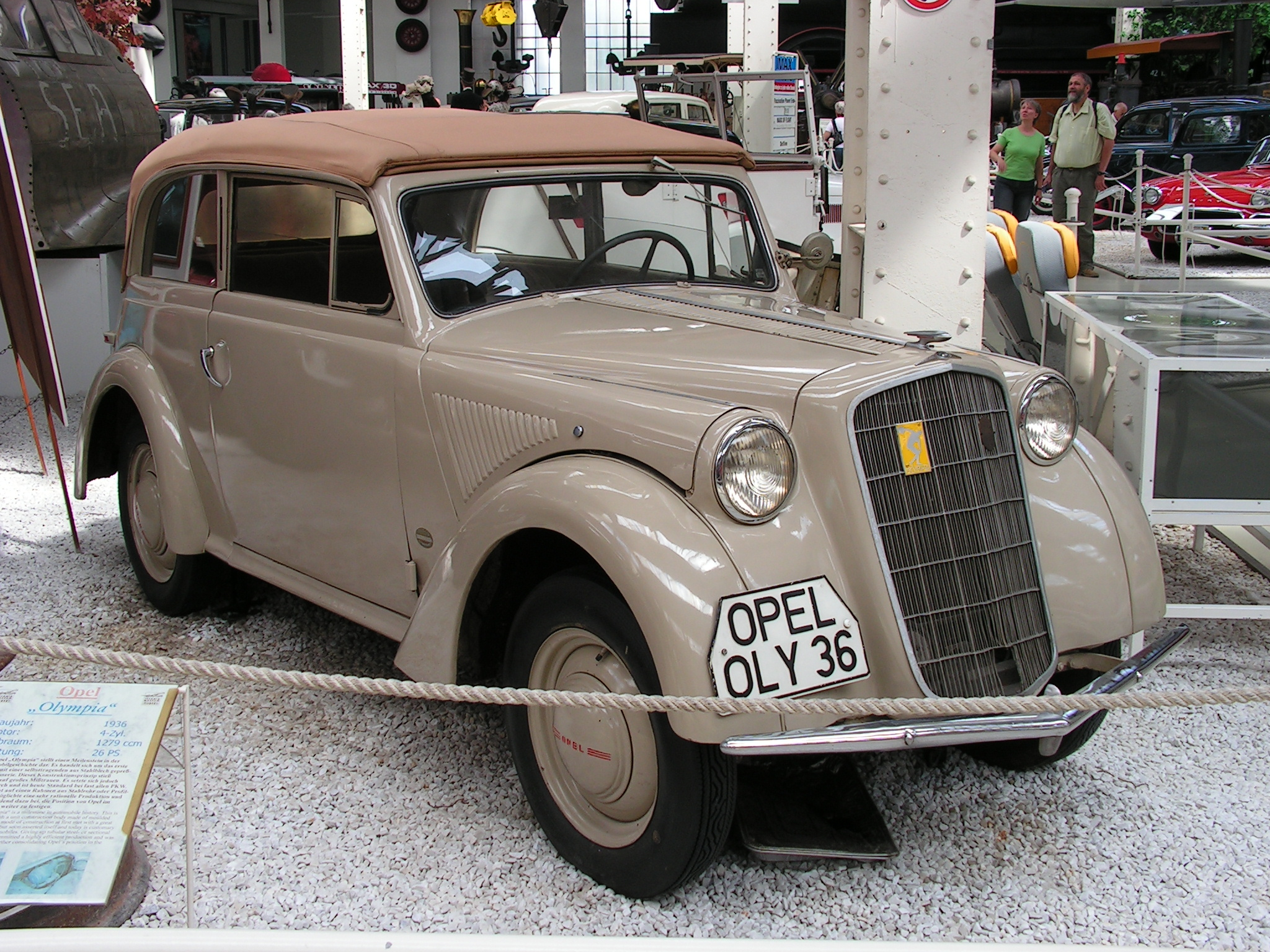
Opel Olympia (1935–1937)

Motor-car pioneers Karl Benz (who later went on to start Mercedes-Benz) and Nicolaus Otto developed four-stroke internal combustion engines in the late 1870s; Benz fitted his design to a coach in 1887, which led to the modern-day motor car. By 1901, Germany was producing about 900 cars a year. In 1926 Daimler-Benz formed from the predecessor companies of Karl Benz and Gottlieb Daimler; it produced cars under the marque of Mercedes-Benz. BMW, though founded in 1916, didn't start auto production until 1928.

American economist Robert A. Brady extensively documented the rationalization movement that shaped German industry in the 1920s, and although his general model of the movement applied to the automotive industry, the sector was in poor health in the later years of the 1918-1933 Weimar Republic. The slow development of the German automotive industry left the German market open for major American auto-manufacturers such as General Motors (which took over German company Opel in 1929) and the Ford Motor Company (which maintained the successful German subsidiary Ford-Werke, beginning in 1925).

The collapse of the global economy during the Great Depression in the early 1930s plunged Germany's auto industry into a severe crisis. While eighty-six auto companies had existed in Germany during the 1920s, barely twelve survived the depression, including Daimler-Benz, Opel and Ford's factory in Cologne. Four of the country's major car manufacturers — Horch, Dampf Kraft Wagen (DKW), Wanderer and Audi — formed a joint venture known as the Auto Union in 1932, which would play a leading role in Germany's comeback from the depression.

The turnabout for the German motor industry came about in the mid-1930s following the election of the Nazi Party to power in 1933. The Nazis instituted a policy known as Motorisierung ("motorization"), a transport policy which Adolf Hitler himself considered a key element of attempts to legitimise the Nazi government by raising the people's standard of living. In addition to development and extensions of major highway schemes (which saw the completion of the first Autobahn in 1935), the Volkswagen project aimed to design and construct a robust but inexpensive "people's car", the product of which was the Volkswagen Beetle, presented in 1937. A new city (known as Wolfsburg from 1945) grew up around the Volkswagen factory to house its huge workforce, but Volkswagen production switched to military output in 1940.

=== Postwar era ===
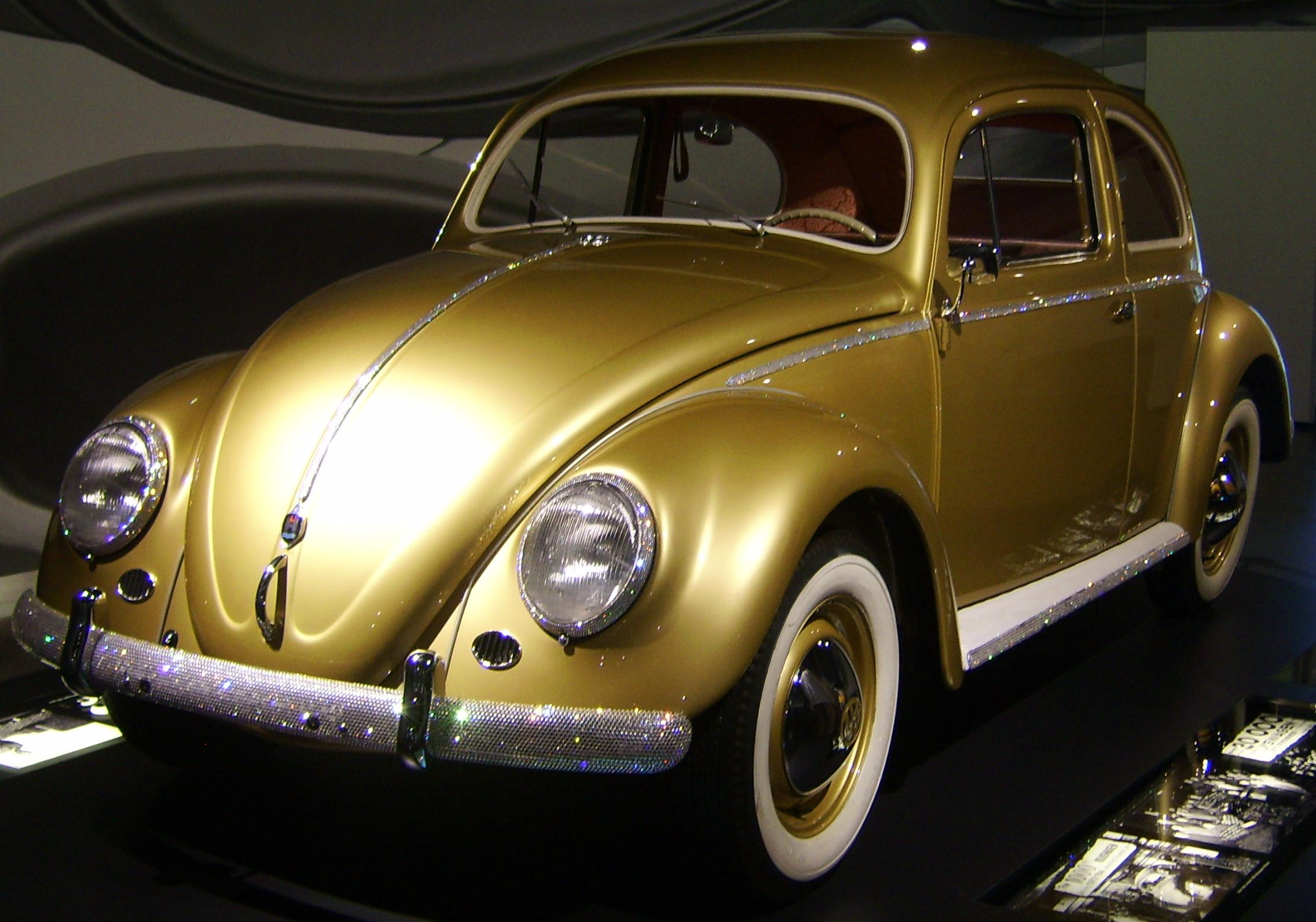
The jeweled one-millionth Type 1, also named Volkswagen Beetle

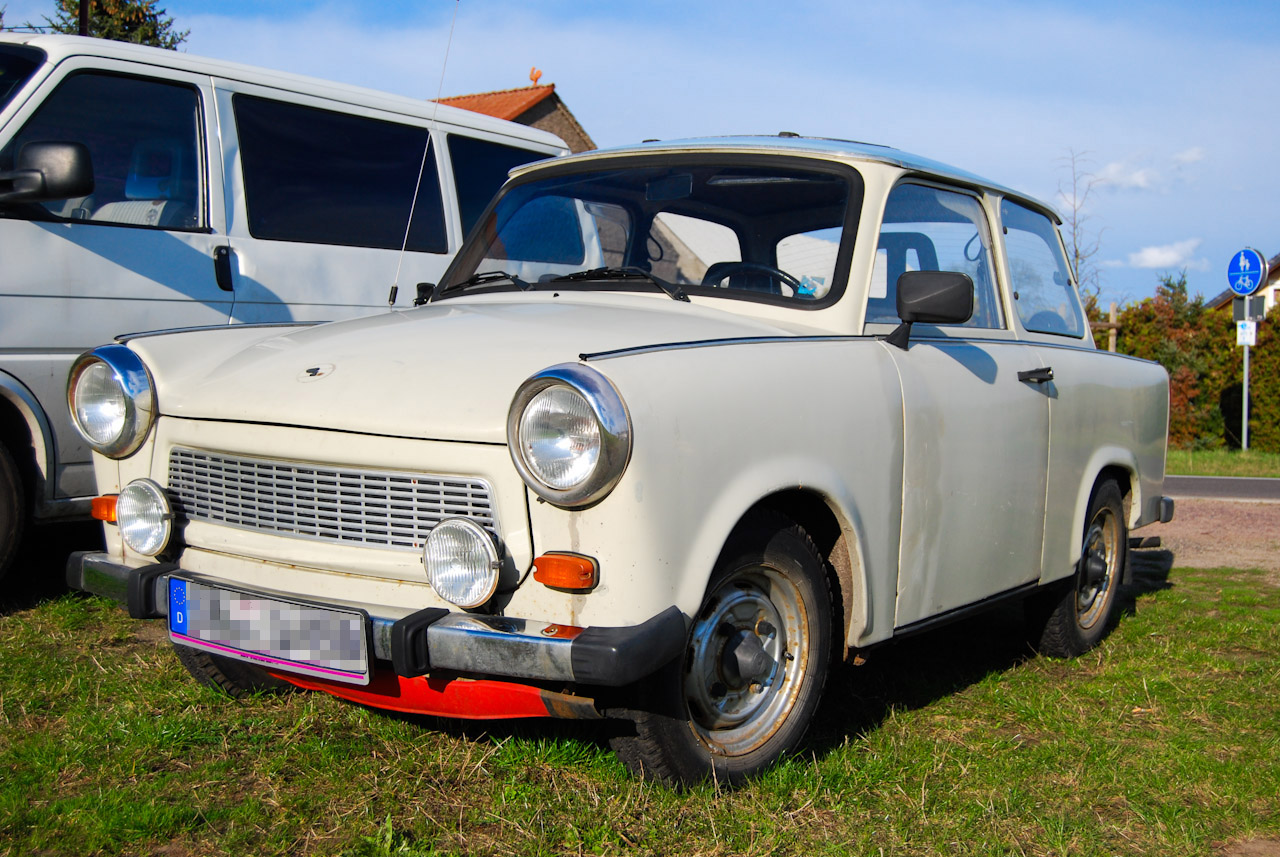
A Trabant 601 "De Luxe Limousine"

By the end of World War II, most of the auto factories had been destroyed or badly damaged. In addition, the eastern part of Germany was under control of the Soviet Union, which dismantled much of the machinery that was left and sent it back to the Soviet Union as war reparations. Some manufacturers, such as Maybach and Adler (automobile), started up again, but did not continue making passenger cars. The Volkswagen production facility in Wolfsburg continued making the Volkswagen Beetle (Type 1) in 1945, a car which it had intended to make prior to the war (under the name of KdF-Wagen), except that the factory was converted to military truck production during the war. By 1955 VW had made one million Volkswagen Beetles, and by 1965 had built 10 million, as it gained popularity on export markets as well as on the home market.

Other auto manufacturers rebuilt their plants and slowly resumed production, with initial models mostly based on pre-war designs. Mercedes-Benz resumed production in 1946 with the pre-war–designed 170 series. In 1951 they introduced the 220 series, which came with a more modern engine, and the 300 series. Opel revived the pre-war cars Opel Olympia in 1947 and the Opel Kapitän in 1948. (Toolings for the Opel Kadett were taken by the Soviets and used to make the Moskvitch 400-420., which had resumed production of trucks in 1945, began building the pre-war Ford Taunus in 1948. Porsche began production of their Porsche 356 sports car in 1948, and replaced it with their long-lived Porsche 911 in 1964 (which remains in production more than 50 years and several incarnations later).

Borgward began production in 1949, and Goliath, Lloyd, Gutbrod, and Auto Union (DKW) began in 1950. BMW's first cars after the war were the luxurious BMW 501 and BMW 502 in 1952. In 1957 NSU Motorenwerke re-entered the car market.

Automobile manufacturers in East Germany after the war included Eisenacher Motorenwerk (EMW), which also made the Wartburg, and VEB Sachsenring Automobilwerke Zwickau, which made the IFA F8 (derived from the DKW F8) and the Trabant. East Germany's status as a communist country was reflecting in the relatively primitive design and refinement of these cars, although they both continued in production until the early 1990s, shortly after the fall of the communist rule and the German reunification.

Initial production by EMW after the war were models that were essentially pre-war BMW 326 and BMW 327 models, as the plant in Eisenach was formerly owned by BMW.

During the mid-to-late 1950s, the Bubble car became popular. BMW was the largest maker, with the BMW Isetta and BMW 600. Other makes included the Messerschmitt KR175 and KR200, the Heinkel Kabine, and the Zündapp Janus. Microcars such as the Glas Goggomobile, BMW 700, and Lloyd 600 also were popular. However, the "Bubble car" concept had been abandoned by 1970.

In the late-1950s, BMW developed financial difficulties and control of the company was acquired by the Quandt family. BMW acquired Glas in 1966. In 1961, the Borgward auto group, including Goliath and Lloyd went out of business. In 1958 Auto Union was acquired by Daimler, but then, in turn, it was sold in stages from 1964 to 1966 to Volkswagen (at which time the DKW marque was ended and the Audi name was resurrected). In 1969, Volkswagen AG acquired NSU Motorenwerke (developer of the Wankel engine) and merged it with Auto Union, but the NSU nameplate disappeared by 1977 when production of the Ro80 rotary-engine saloon (European Car of the Year on its launch 10 years earlier) was stopped largely due to disappointing sales and a poor reputation for reliability.

Ford merged its German and British operations in 1967, with the intention of producing identical cars at its German and British factories. Ford had also opened a factory at Genk, Belgium, in 1963. In 1976, it also opened a factory in Valencia, Spain, where production of the new Fiesta supermini (the first Ford of this size to be built in any country) was concentrated. The Escort, launched in 1967, was the first new Ford to be produced at both the German and British factories. At the beginning of 1969, Ford launched a new sporting coupe, the Capri, which like the Escort was produced throughout Europe. The Taunus of 1970 made use of the same basic design as the British Cortina MK3, but had slightly different exterior styling, although those styling differences were ironed out with the launch of the 1976 Taunus. Ford's new flagship model, the Granada, was built in Britain, Germany and Spain from the beginning of 1972, although British production was withdrawn after a few years.

=== 1970s ===
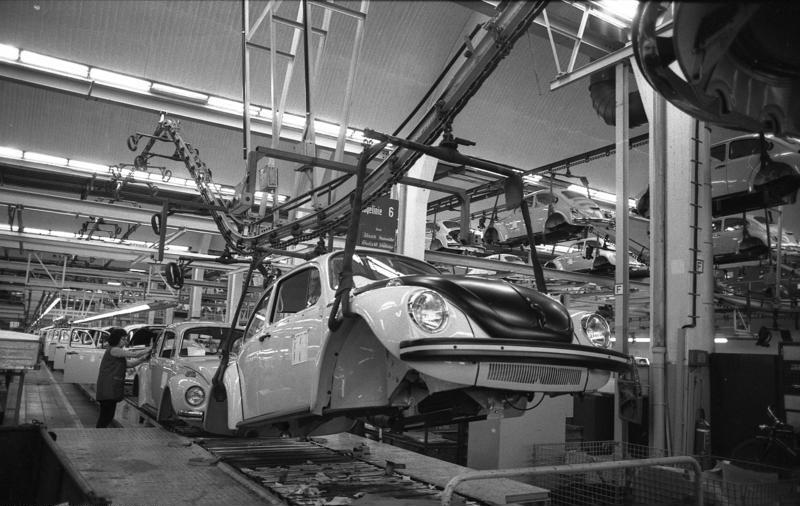
Volkswagen assembly line as of 1973

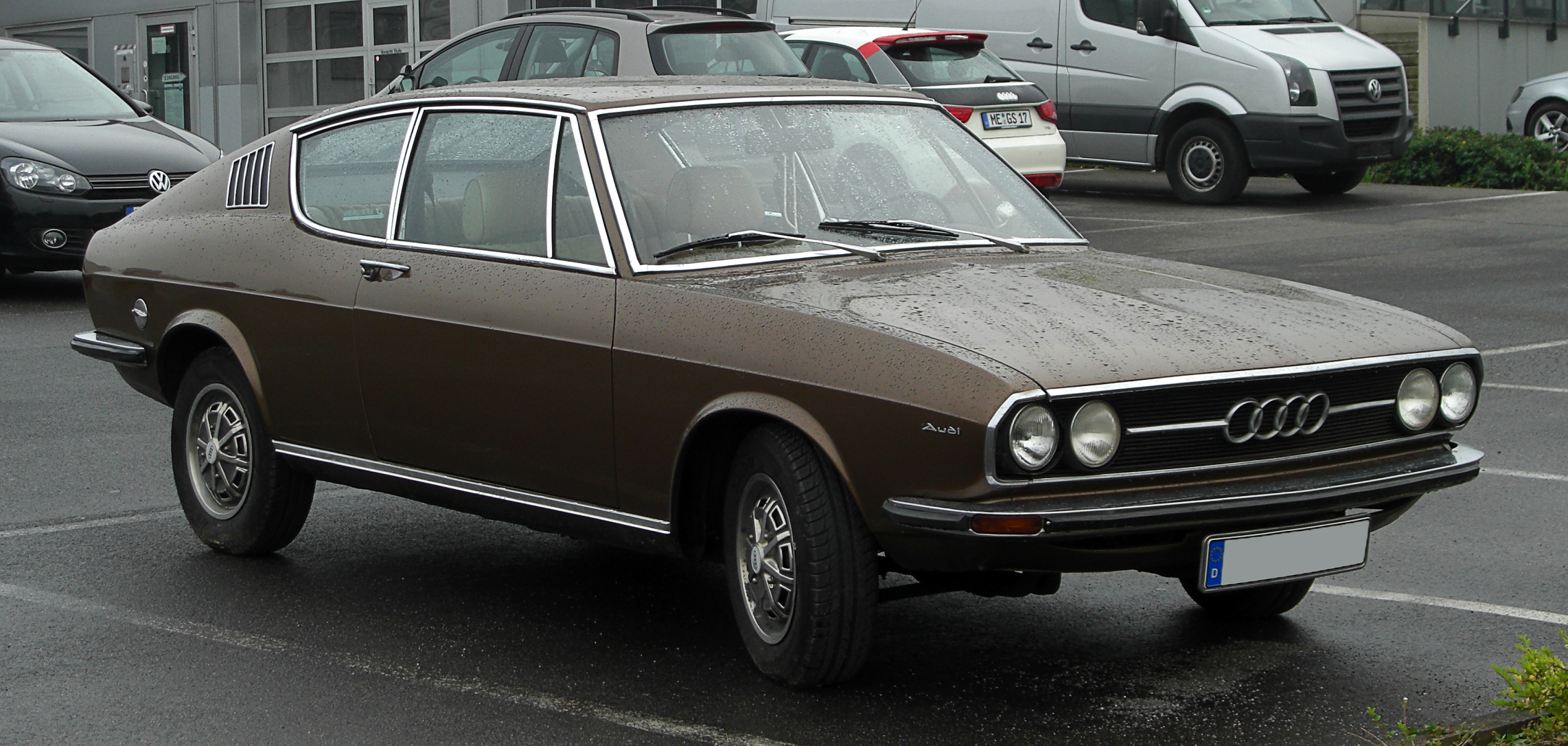
Audi 100 Coupe S (C1)

Volkswagen was faced with major financial difficulties in the early 1970s; with its aging Beetle still selling strongly all over the world but its newer models had been less successful. However, the company then enjoyed a revival with the arrival of the popular Passat in 1973, Golf in 1974 and Polo in 1975 - all of these cars featured the new front-wheel drive hatchback layout which was enjoying a rise in popularity across Europe after first being patented by Renault of France with the R16 in 1965. The Polo was Volkswagen's new entry-level model, and was aimed directly at modern small hatchbacks like the Fiat 127 and Renault 5. The mid-range Golf was seen as the car to eventually replace the Beetle, and was easily the first popular hatchback of this size in Europe, leading to most leading carmakers having a similar-sized hatchback by the early 1980s. Production of the Beetle finished in Germany in 1978, although it continued to be produced in Mexico and Brazil until 2003, with a small number of models being imported to Germany and the rest of Europe during its final 25 years. The Passat was marketed as a more advanced alternative to traditional larger saloon cars like the Ford Taunus/Cortina, Opel Ascona (sold in Britain from 1975 as the Vauxhall Cavalier) and the Renault 12.

The Scirocco coupe of 1974 was also a success in the smaller sports car market, competing against the likes of the Ford Capri and Opel Manta. Its partner company Audi also enjoyed an upturn thanks to the success of its 100 range (launched in 1968) and the smaller 80 (launched in 1972 and voted European Car of the Year). Both of the new Audi models featured front-wheel drive. The Volkswagen Polo was in fact a rebadged version of the Audi 50, but the Audi original was a slower seller than the Volkswagen that it spawned and was only available in certain markets.

Volkswagen and Audi both enjoyed a growing rise in popularity in overseas markets during the 1970s and this continued throughout the 1980s. Audi launched a well-received large saloon model, the Audi 100, in 1968, and followed this four years later with the smaller Audi 80, winner of the European Car of the Year award for 1973. In 1980, Audi moved into the sports car market with its front-wheel drive Coupe and the four-wheel drive, high-performance version, the Quattro. The Quattro four-wheel drive system was later adopted on Audi's saloon models.

During the 1970s and early 1980s, General Motors integrated Opel with the British Vauxhall brand so that designs were shared with the only difference being the names. Faced with fierce competition from up-to-date designs from Volkswagen, General Motors moved to a front-wheel drive hatchback in 1979 with the latest version of the Opel Kadett, followed in 1981 by new Ascona (which retained the Vauxhall Cavalier name for the British market). In 1982 it opened a new plant Zaragoza, Spain, to produce the new Opel Corsa supermini; this car was later imported to Britain as the Vauxhall Nova. Production of the Kadett/Astra and Ascona/Cavalier models was divided between factories in Germany, Belgium, Spain and Britain. The Vauxhall Carlton was briefly built in Britain from its 1978 launch, but within a few years production was fully concentrated in Germany, where it was built alongside the identical Opel Rekord.

=== 1980s and 1990s ===
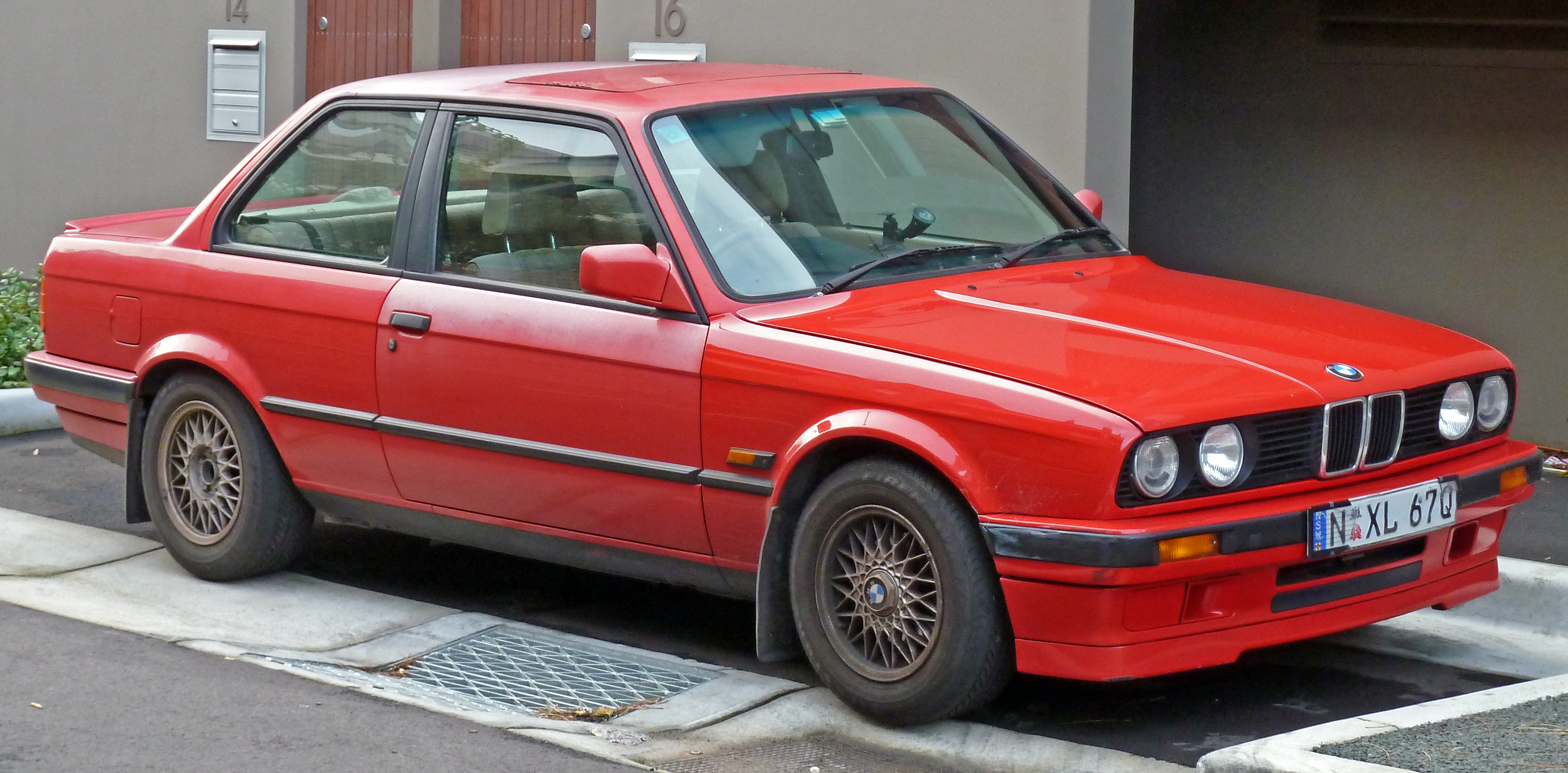
BMW 3 Series (E30)

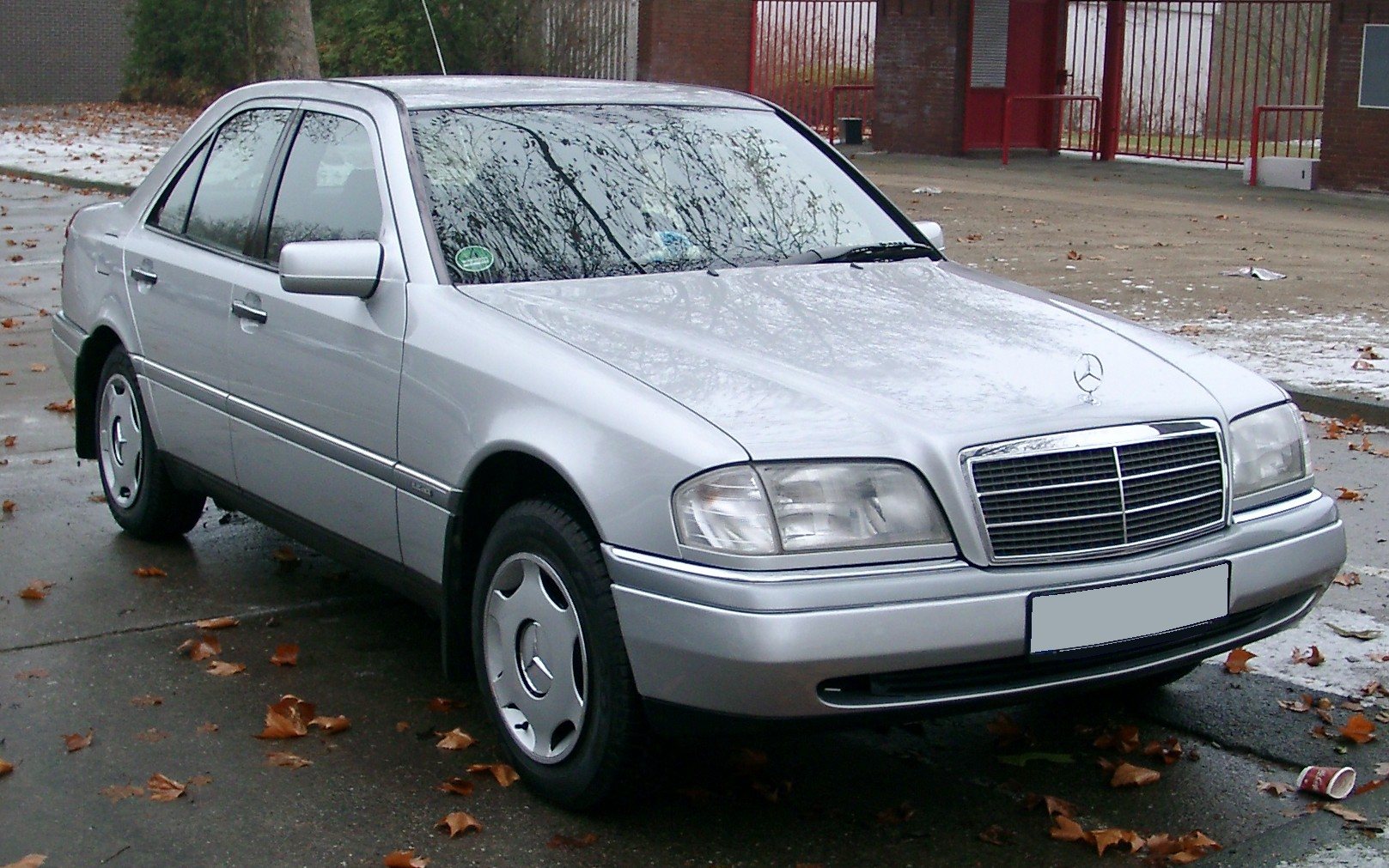
Mercedes-Benz C-Class (W202)

The final version of the Opel Kadett was voted European Car of the Year on its launch in 1984, as was the Opel Rekord's successor – the Omega – two years afterwards. The Ascona's successor, the Vectra (still the Vauxhall Cavalier in Britain), was launched in 1988, but missed out of the European Car of the Year accolade to the Fiat Tipo.

With the radical changes in car design that took place throughout the 1970s and into the 1980s, Ford responded by substantially altering its model line-up. After launching the Fiesta supermini in 1976, it switched to front-wheel drive and a hatchback on the MK3 Escort on its launch in 1980, and opted to replace the Taunus/Cortina with the Sierra in 1982 – abandoning the popular saloon format for an aerodynamic hatchback, although a saloon version was added in 1987. Ford had also responded in 1983 to the continuing demand for family saloons by launching the Orion, the saloon version of the Escort. The Scorpio replaced the Granada as Ford's European flagship in 1985, and was solely produced at the Cologne plant in Germany. The Scorpio was originally available only as a hatchback, and despite its popularity, Ford eventually expanded the Scorpio range by launching a saloon model in 1990 and an estate model in 1992. The declining demand for sporting coupes led to Ford's decision not to directly replace the Capri, which was discontinued after 1986.

After its rejuvenation during the 1970s, VW modernised its model ranges during the first half of the 1980s and continued to enjoy strong sales in Germany and most other European markets. The Polo, Passat and Scirocco all entered their second generation during 1981, and the MK2 Golf was launched in 1983. A saloon version of the MK1 Golf, the Jetta, had been available since 1979, and the MK2 Jetta was launched in 1984. 1988 saw the launch of the MK3 Passat and a new coupe, the Corrado, which was produced alongside the Scirocco until the older car's demise in 1992.

The VW Polo was updated in 1990, an all-new model finally arriving in 1994, and the MK3 Golf was voted European Car of the Year shortly after its launch in 1991. The saloon version of the MK3 Golf, the Vento, was launched in 1992. The Passat was updated in 1993 before an all-new model was launched in 1996. The Corrado was discontinued in 1996 without an immediate replacement. VW moved into the MPV market with the Sharan in 1995, built in Portugal as part of a venture with Ford, which produced the identical Galaxy. A new Beetle, with front-wheel drive and a front-mounted engine, was launched in 1998, but like the later versions of the original model it was produced in Mexico rather than Germany. The MK4 Golf was launched in late 1997, and joined a year later by a saloon version, the Bora.

BMW and Mercedes-Benz remained committed to rear-wheel drive on its saloons and booted coupes during these years. BMW, however, developed its model ranges more comprehensively in the 1980s and early 1990s. The original BMW 3 Series, launched in 1975, was sold as a two-door saloon or cabriolet. The second generation model launched in 1982, however, was eventually available also as a four-door saloon and five-door estate, and during the 1990s the third generation model range eventually included a three-door hatchback as well. The BMW 5 Series, the mid-range model launched in 1972, was only sold as a four-door saloon for its first two generations, but a third generation model was available as an estate from 1991.

The West of Germany was far more technically advanced in comparison with the East (more than 4.5 million against 200,000 annual production of auto vehicles in the 1980s), with the divide ending with German reunification in 1990.

During the 1980s and 1990s, the German auto industry engaged in major acquisitions and international expansion all over the world. Besides of direct export, German manufacturers found or bought plants in European, Asian, Latin American countries and in the United States even. Auto industry of Mexico, Brazil, China, Turkey, some post-socialist East European countries gained by German investments in a significant share.

Volkswagen set up a joint venture with Shanghai Automotive Industry Corporation in 1984 (named Shanghai Volkswagen Automotive), and in 1990 established FAW-Volkswagen to produce VWs and Audis in China. VW also acquired SEAT of Spain in 1986 and Škoda of Czechoslovakia in 1991, improving the model ranges of these manufacturers and helping increase their market share significantly across Europe. Volkswagen had even shifted Polo production to a SEAT factory in Spain after its acquisition of SEAT, and the 1993 SEAT Ibiza formed the basis for the following year's new Polo.

VW also made use of its components across the different marques; for instance, by the year 2000, the floorplan of the Volkswagen Golf for instance had spawned the Audi A3, Audi TT, SEAT Toledo, Seat Leon, Skoda Octavia and Volkswagen Bora.

By the end of the 1990s, VW moved into the luxury and supercar end of the market and acquired Bentley of Britain and the Bugatti and Lamborghini marques from Italy.

Ford had concentrated Sierra production in Belgium rather than Germany and Britain from the end of the 1980s, and its successor - the Mondeo - was solely produced in Belgium when it went into production around the end of 1992. The Escort remained in production throughout Europe until 2000, although its successor, the Focus, launched in 1998, was only produced in Germany for European buyers. The Scorpio was discontinued in 1998 and not directly replaced, with Ford instead directing potential Scorpio buyers to high-specification versions of the smaller Mondeo. The Scorpio's demise occurred around the same time that Ford took over Volvo, which already had a strong presence in the executive car market, while Ford had taken over British luxury carmaker Jaguar in 1989 and was about to launch the Jaguar S-Type.

At the beginning of 1990s, Ford and Volkswagen agreed to a venture to produce an MPV together at the same factory with the same basic design. The result of this venture was the Ford Galaxy and Volkswagen Sharan, but these vehicles were produced in Portugal rather than Germany from their launch in 1995. They were joined a year later by the SEAT Alhambra.

=== 21st century ===
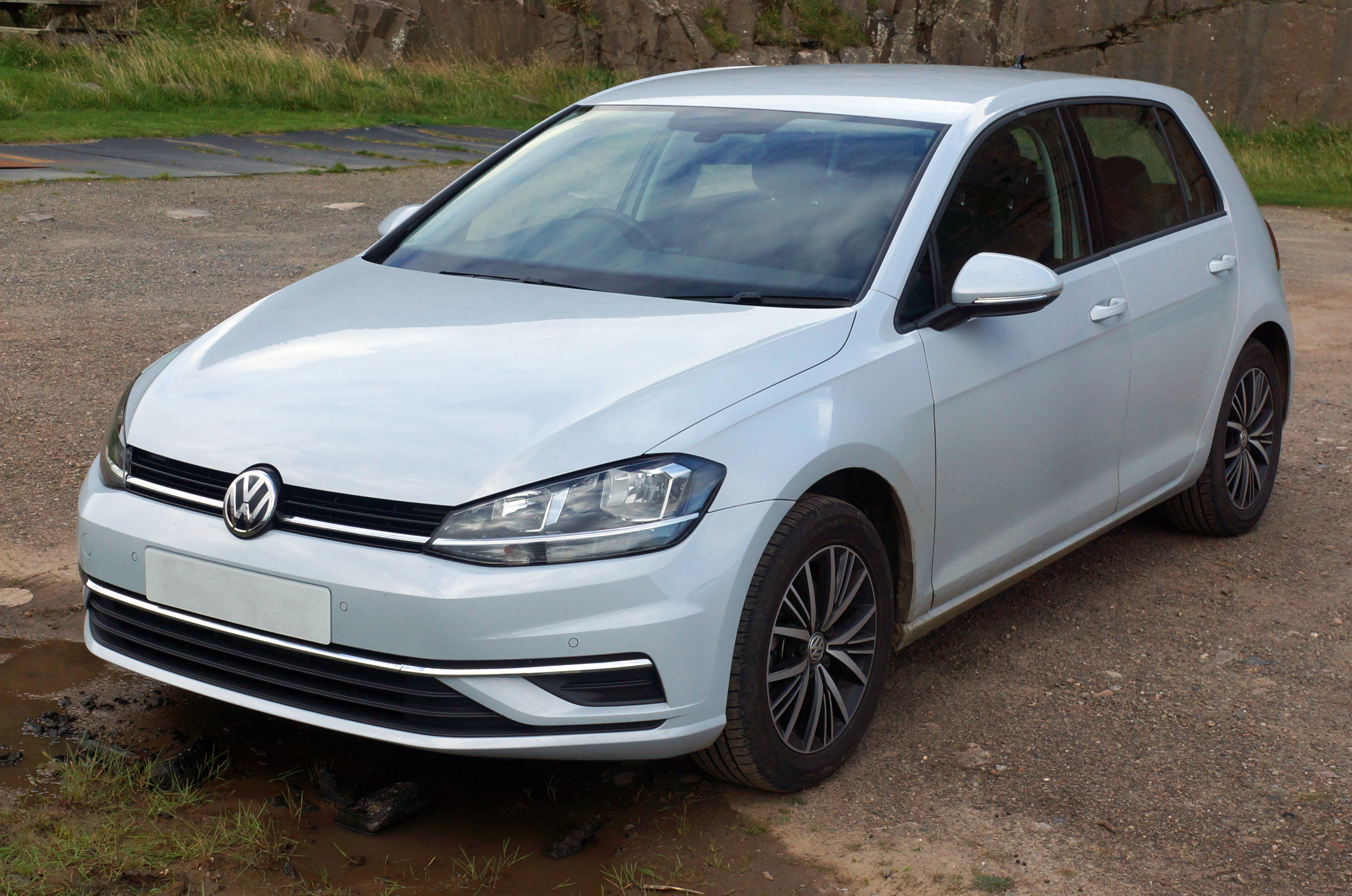
2017 Volkswagen Golf VII, manufactured in Wolfsburg and Zwickau

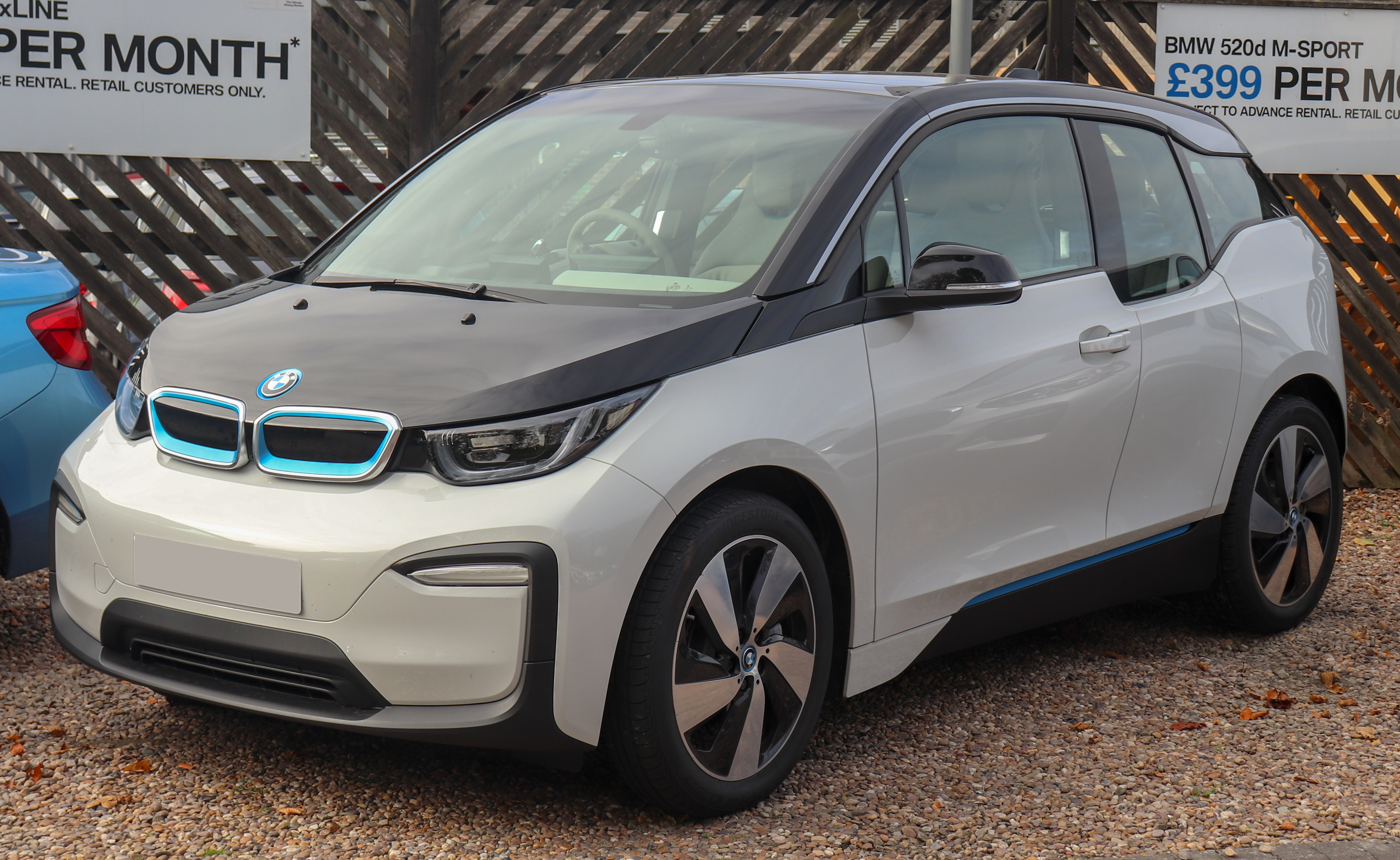
BMW i3, third most sold electric car worldwide from 2014 to 2016

BMW acquired the British Rover Group in 1994, but large losses led to its sale in 2000. However, BMW retained the Mini (marque) name for a line of new cars, all built in Britain from 2001. During the 1990s, BMW opened a production facility for SUVs in Spartanburg County, South Carolina. BMW also acquired the Rolls-Royce Motor Cars name, effective as of 2003, and in the same year established a joint venture in China named BMW Brilliance. Daimler-Benz entered into what was initially called a "merger of equals" with Chrysler Corporation in 1998. However, cultural differences and operating losses led to its dissolution in 2007, although Daimler-Benz kept Chrysler's Chinese joint venture, renamed Beijing Benz. The company also launched the Smart in 1998 and relaunched the Maybach brand in 2002. In addition, during the 1990s they opened a production facility for SUVs in Tuscaloosa County, Alabama.

On 5 July 2012, Volkswagen AG announced a deal with Porsche resulting in VW's full ownership of Porsche on 1 August 2012. The deal was classified as a restructuring rather than a takeover due to the transfer of a single share as part of the deal. Volkswagen AG paid Porsche shareholders $5.61 billion for the remaining 50.1% it did not own.

Currently, five German companies and seven marques dominate the automotive industry in the country: Volkswagen (and subsidiaries Audi and Porsche), BMW, Daimler, Opel and Ford-Werke GmbH. Nearly six million vehicles were produced in Germany in 2014 though that fell to 3.7 million by 2020, and approximately 5.5 million are produced overseas by German brands. Alongside the United States, China and Japan, Germany is one of the top 4 automobile manufacturers in the world. The Volkswagen Group is one of the three biggest automotive companies in the world (along with Toyota and General Motors).

The Chevrolet Volt and its GM Voltec powertrain Technology were invented and developed first and foremost by the former German Opel engineer Frank Weber and some of the most important parts of the development of GM's electric vehicles is done in Germany.

In November 2019 Tesla Inc. announced the construction of its first European "Gigafactory" (a car battery production facility, as referred to by Tesla CEO Elon Musk) in Grünheide near Berlin. It will initially have over 4,000 employees.

Regulation (EU) 2019/631 sets EU fleet-wide targets for new passenger cars and light commercial vehicles. From 2035, the targets require a 100% reduction from the 2021 target level; the regulation is framed as a fleet-average CO_{2} standard, rather than as a rule governing every individual automobile sale in Germany. In 2024, Volkswagen announced they would make a joint venture with electric car maker Rivian, a competitor of Tesla.

== Plants ==
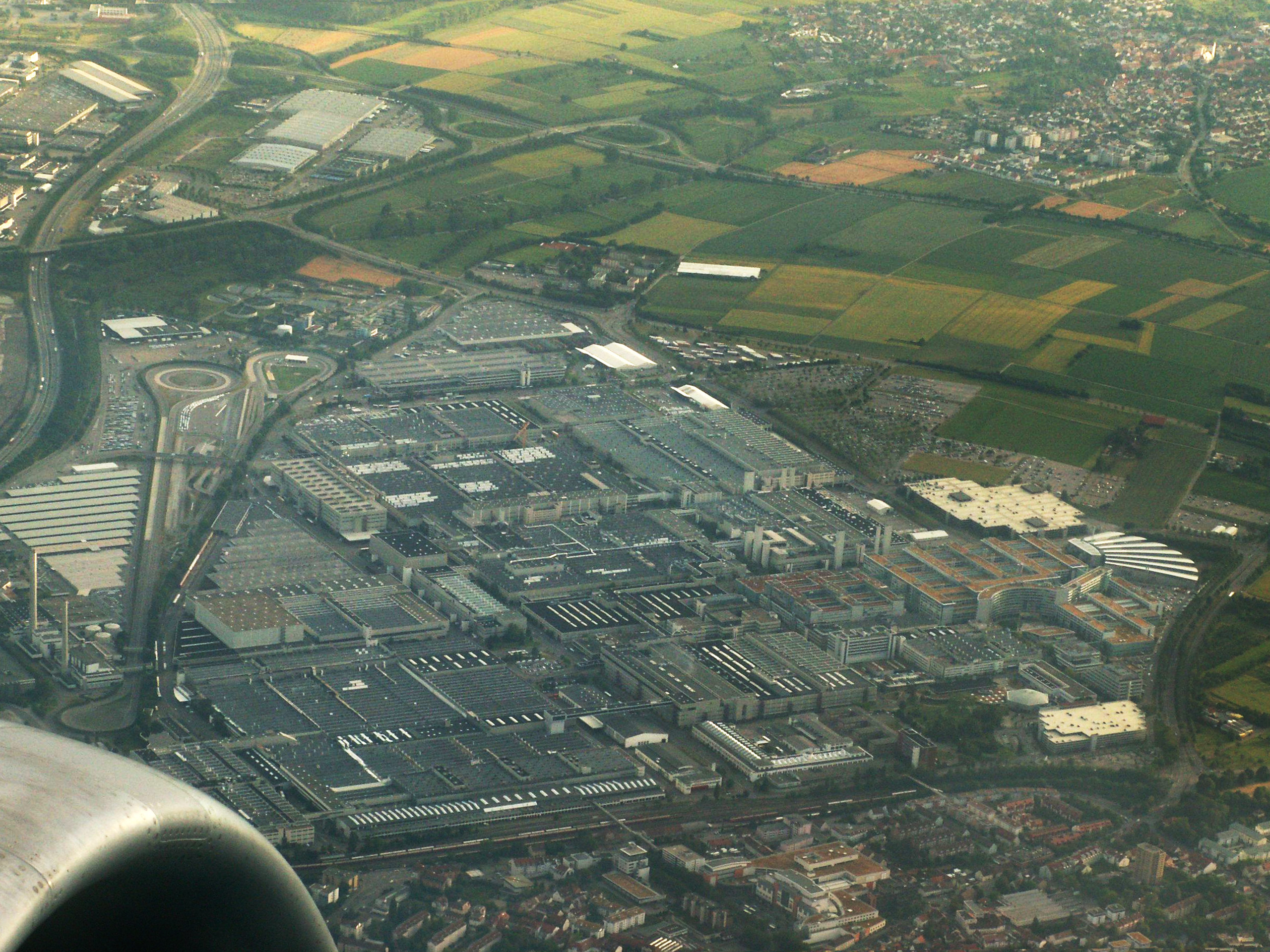
Mercedes-Benz plant in Sindelfingen

Automotive plants in Germany:

=== Baden-Württemberg ===
- Affalterbach: Mercedes-AMG
- Gaggenau: Mercedes-Benz
- Lorch: Binz custom vehicles (Mercedes-Benz)
- Mannheim: Mercedes-Benz, Setra, truck engines, EvoBus
- Neckarsulm: Audi
- Rastatt: Mercedes-Benz
- Sindelfingen: Mercedes-Benz
- Stuttgart: Mercedes-Benz, Porsche
- Ulm: Mercedes-Benz, Magirus firefighting vehicles
- Weissach: Porsche

=== Bavaria ===
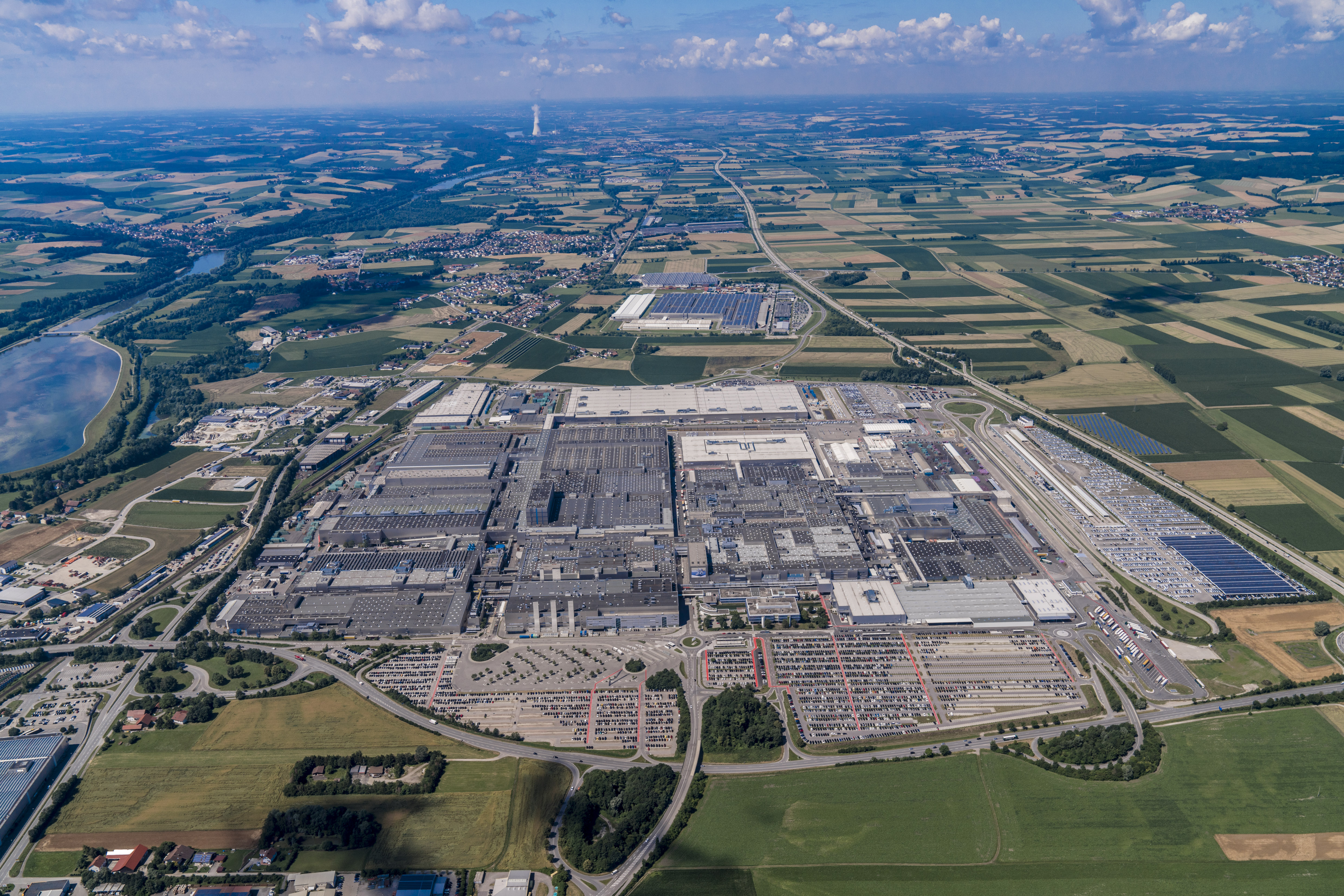
BMW Group Plant Dingolfing

- Dingolfing: BMW
- Ingolstadt: Audi
- Munich: BMW, MAN
- Neu-Ulm: Mercedes-Benz, Setra, EvoBus
- Nuremberg: MAN
- Pfaffenhausen: RUF
- Regensburg: BMW

=== Brandenburg ===
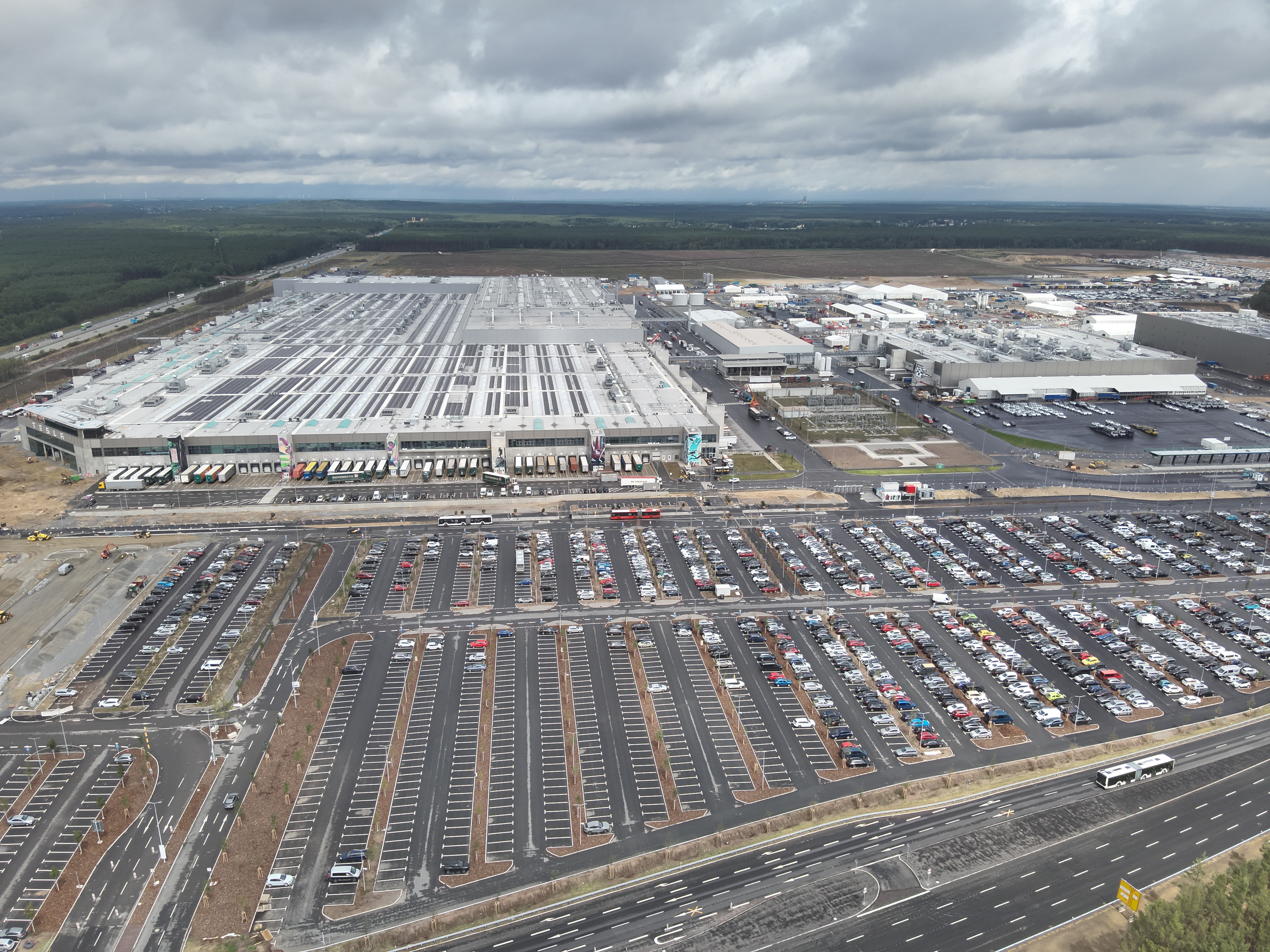
Tesla Gigafactory Berlin-Brandenburg

- Grünheide: Tesla
- Ludwigsfelde: Mercedes-Benz

=== Rhineland-Palatinate ===
- Kaiserslautern: Opel
- Wörth am Rhein: Mercedes-Benz, Unimog

=== Saxony ===
- Chemnitz: Volkswagen
- Dresden: Volkswagen
- Leipzig: BMW
- Leipzig: Porsche
- Zwickau: Volkswagen

=== Thuringia ===
- Eisenach: Opel
- Kölleda: Mercedes-Benz

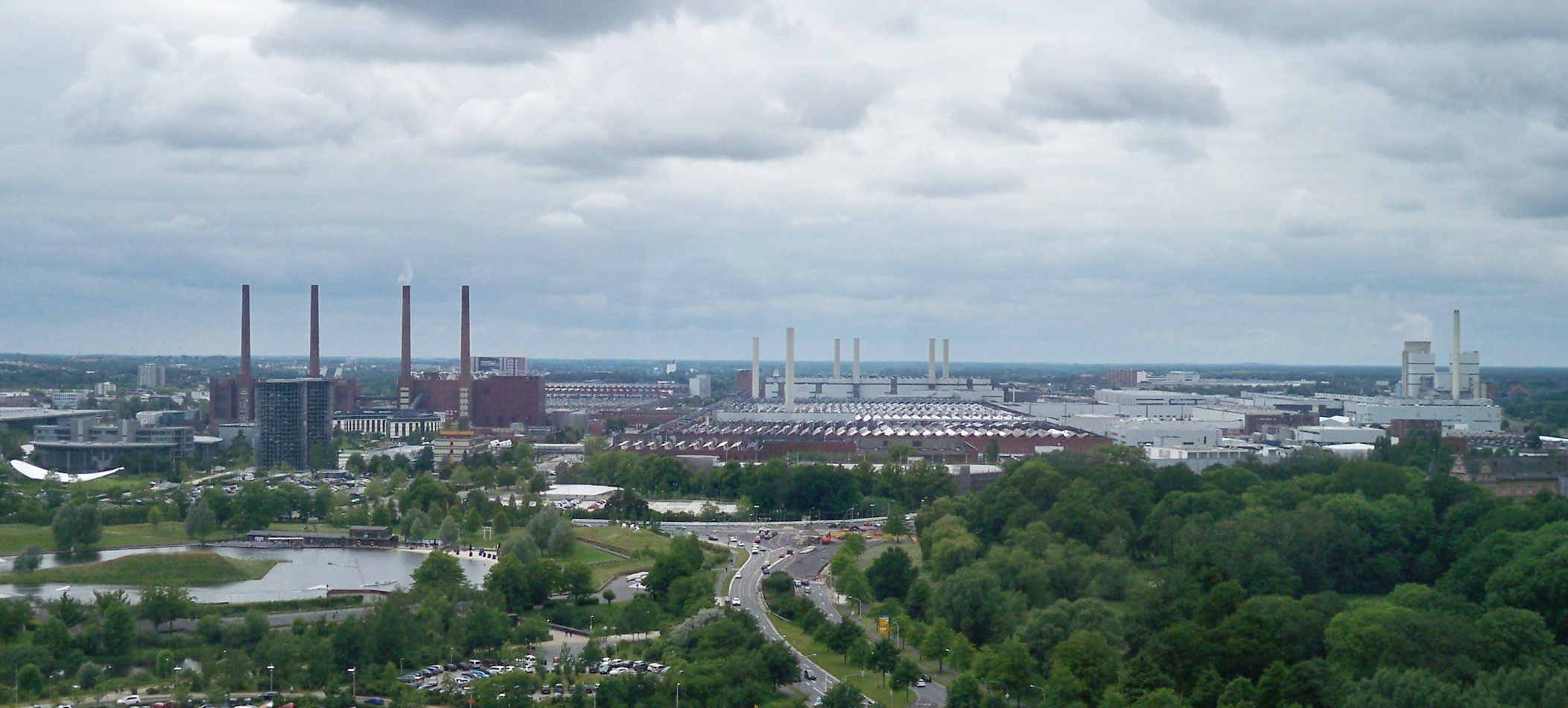
Wolfsburg Volkswagen Plant

=== Lower Saxony ===
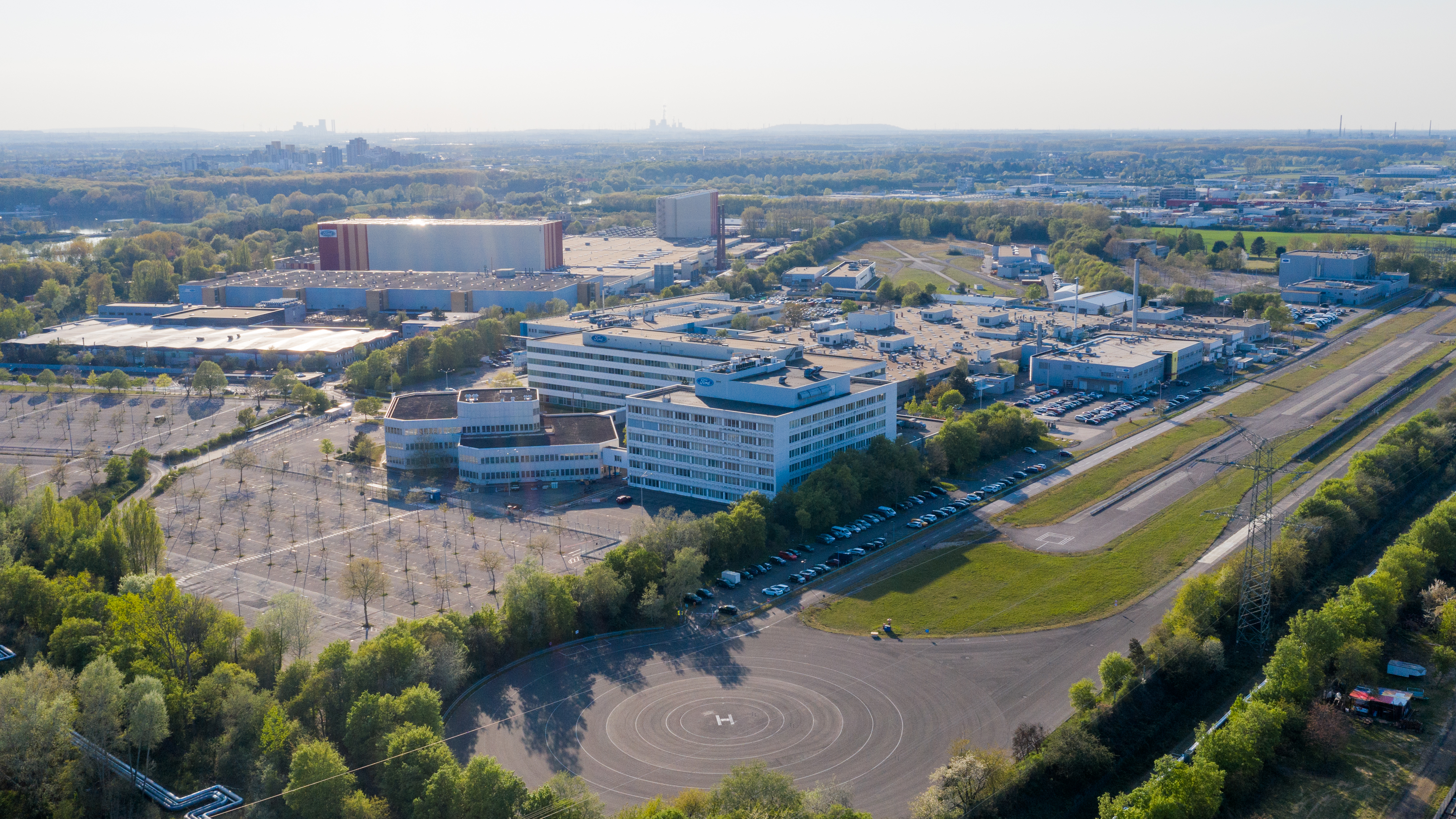
Ford Factory in Cologne

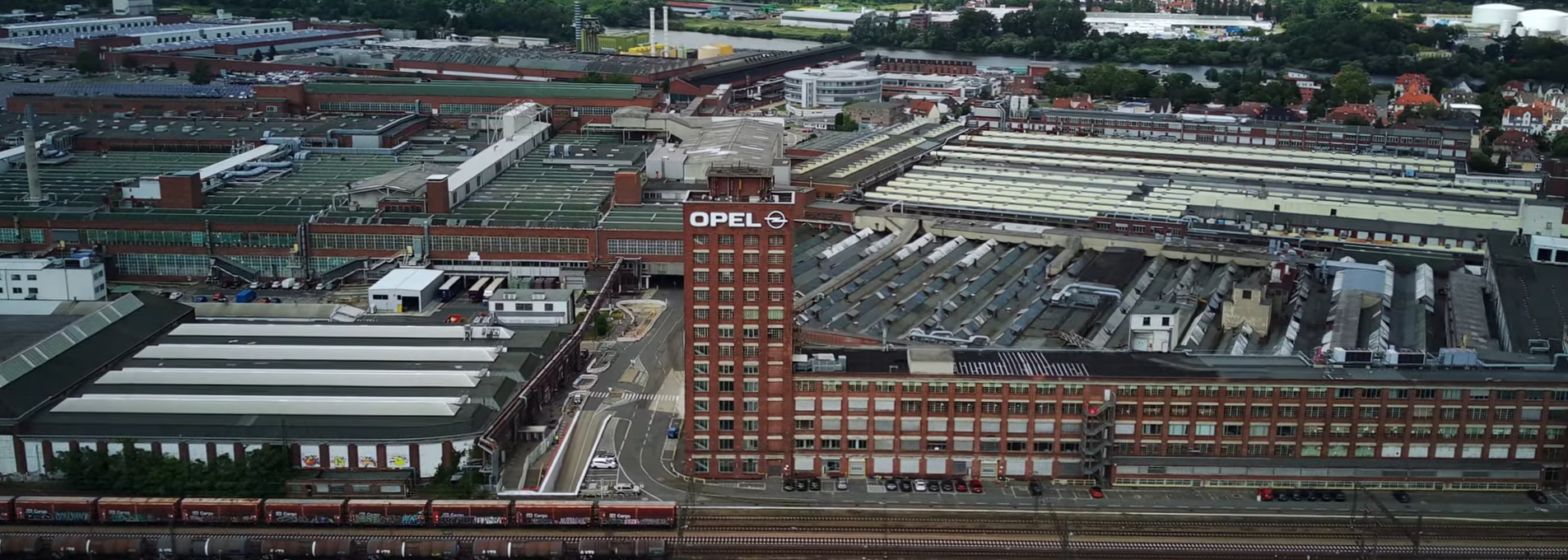
Opel Factory in Rüsselsheim

- Emden: Volkswagen
- Hanover: Porsche, Volkswagen
- Osnabrück: Volkswagen, Porsche
- Salzgitter: MAN heavy trucks
- Salzgitter: Volkswagen
- Wolfsburg: Volkswagen

=== North Rhine-Westphalia ===
- Dortmund: Mercedes-Benz, EvoBus
- Düsseldorf: Mercedes-Benz, Volkswagen
- Cologne: Ford

=== Rest of the country ===
- Bremen: Mercedes-Benz
- Heyda: AC Automotive
- Rüsselsheim: Opel
- Saarlouis: Ford

== See also ==
- List of automobile manufacturers of Germany
