= BMW 600 =

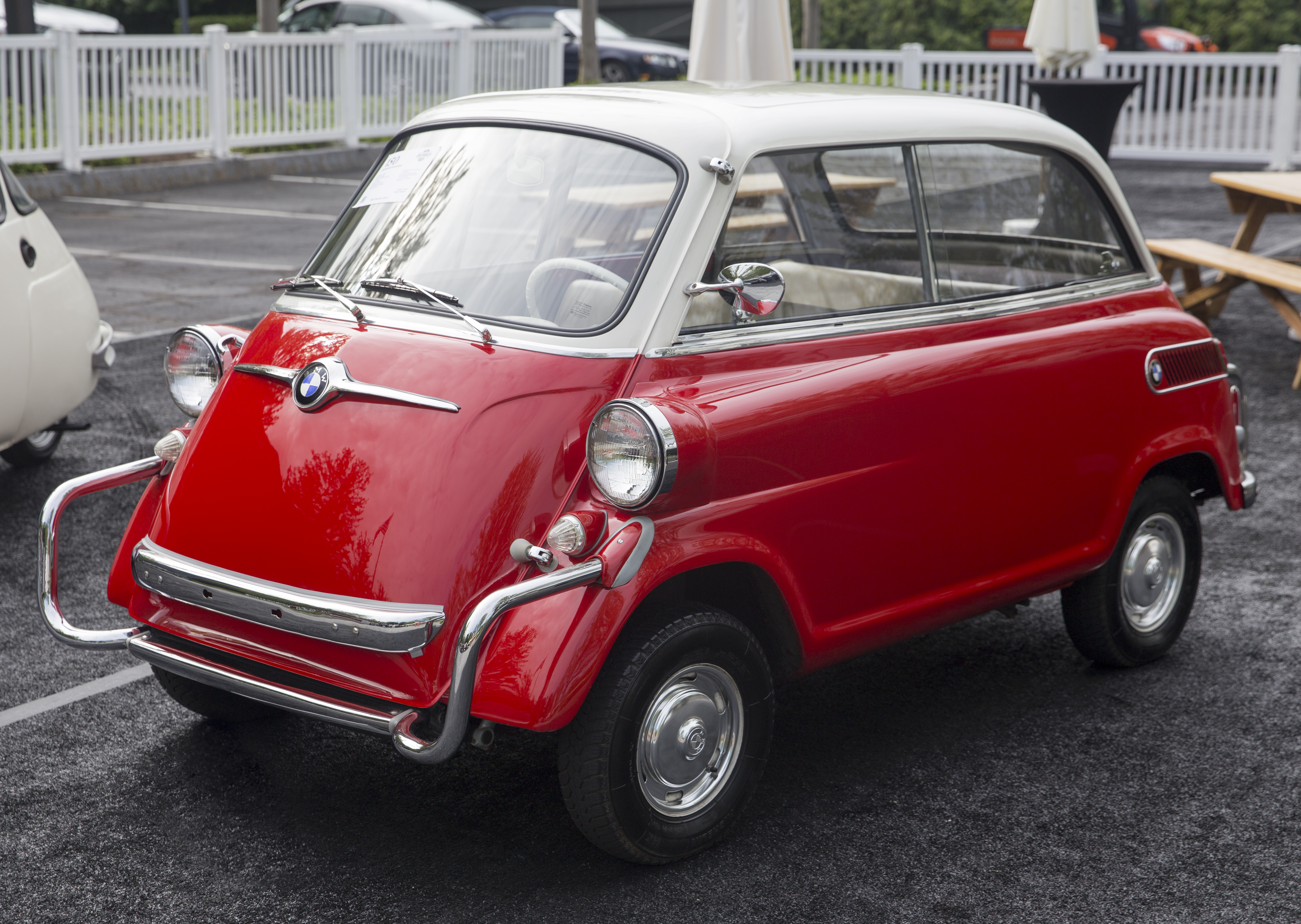
- US-market BMW 600

Overview
- Manufacturer: BMW
- Also called: BMW Isetta 600
- Production: 1957–1959; 34,813 built
- Designer: Willy Black

Body and chassis
- Class: City car (A)
- Layout: RR layout
- Related: BMW Isetta

Powertrain
- Engine: 582 cc flat twin
- Transmission: 4-speed manual all-synchromesh

Dimensions
- Wheelbase: 1,700 mm (66.9 in)
- Length: 2,900 mm (114.2 in) (international); 2,946 mm (116.0 in) (US version)
- Width: 1,400 mm (55 in)
- Height: 1,375 mm (54.1 in)
- Curb weight: 515 kg (1,135 lb) dry weight

Chronology
- Predecessor: BMW 3/20
- Successor: BMW 700

The BMW 600 is a four-seater city car produced by the German automaker BMW from mid-1957 until November 1959. Partially based on the BMW Isetta two seater, it was BMW's first postwar four-seater economy car. It was not a sales success, but it began the design process for its more successful successor, the BMW 700.

== Concept, design, and engineering ==
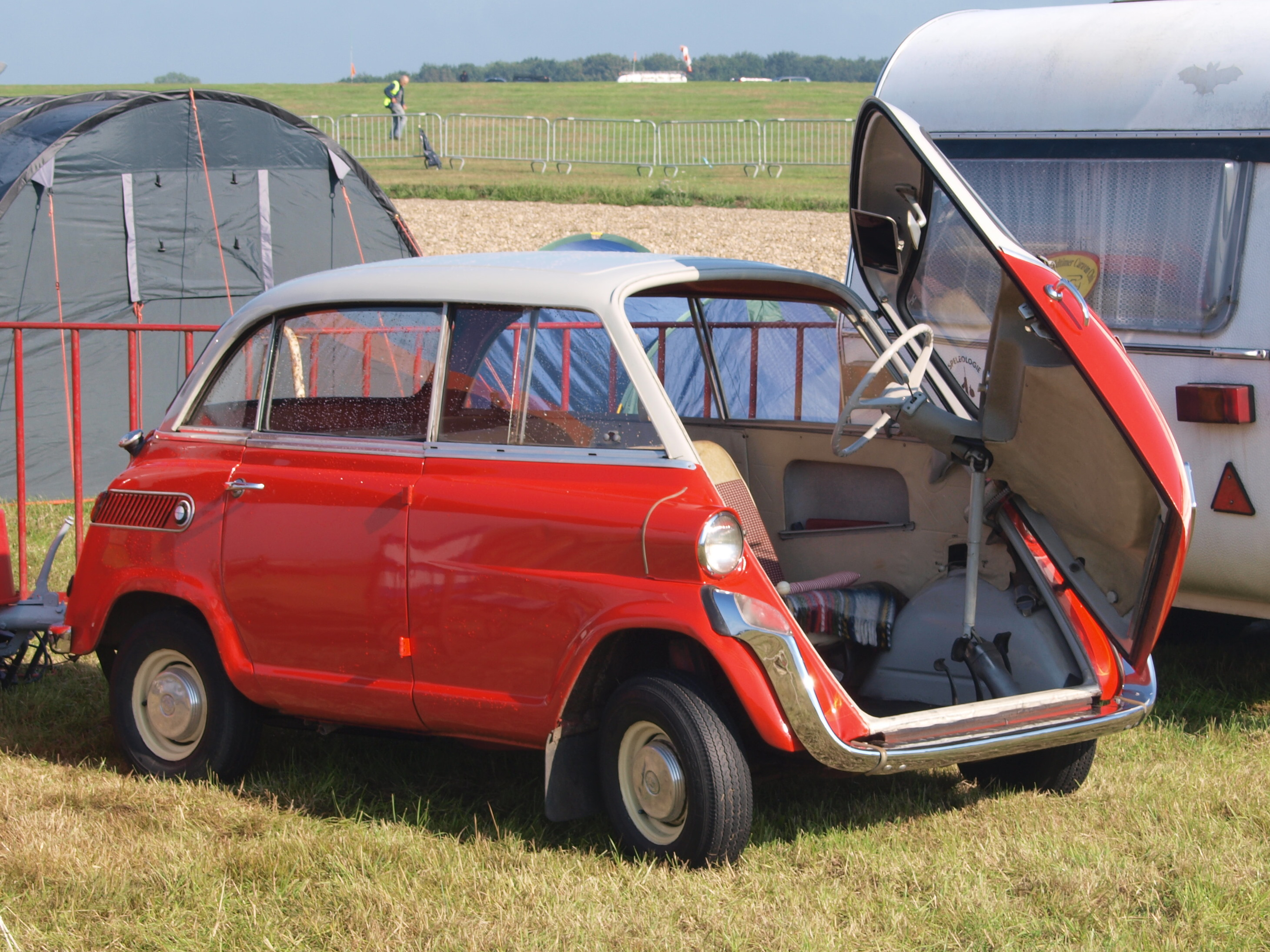
Right 3/4 view, with front door open and side door in view

BMW needed to expand its model range, but they did not have the resources to develop an all-new car with an all-new engine. Therefore, it used the Isetta as starting point for a new four seat economy car.

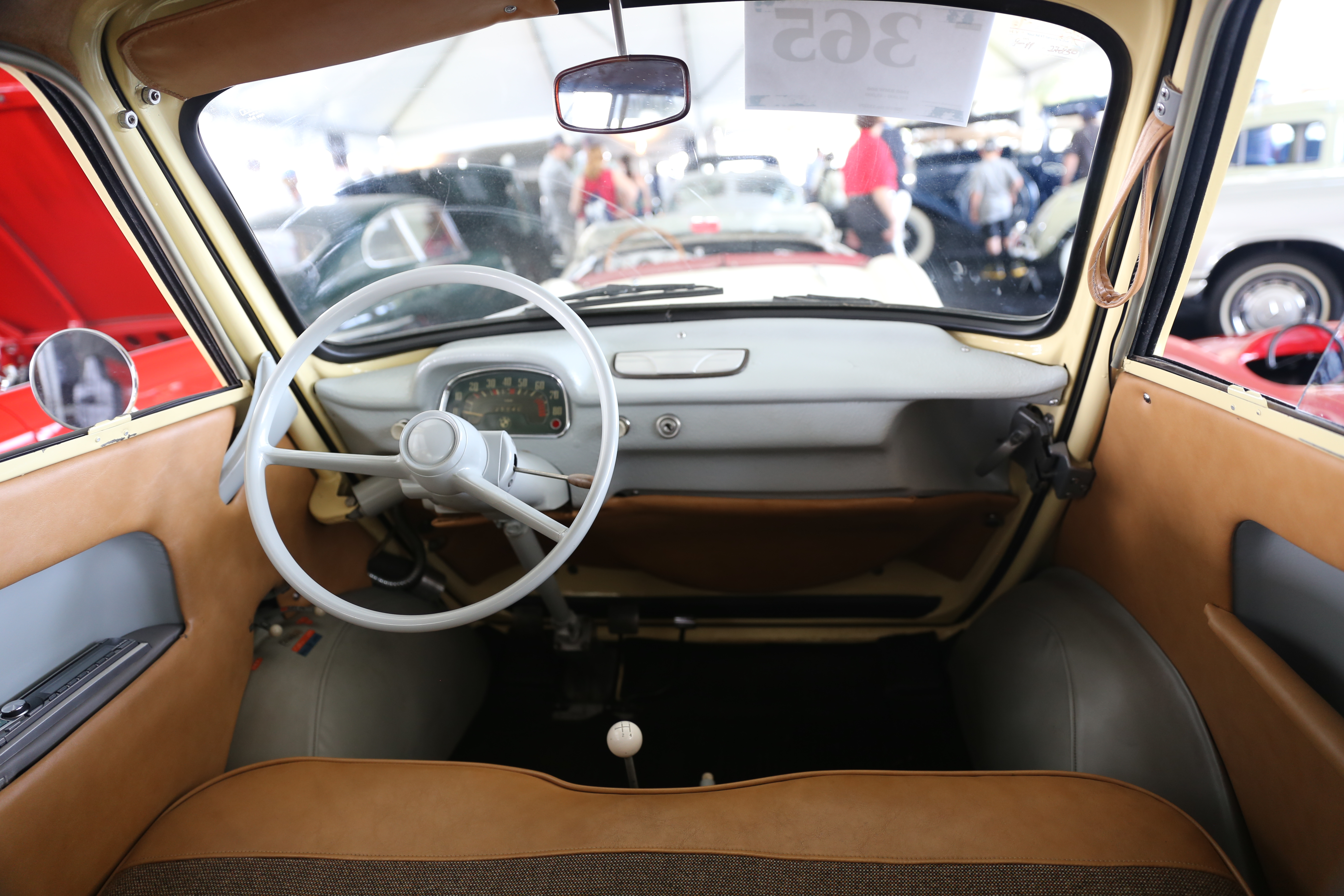
BMW 600 interior

As a result, the 600 used the front suspension and front door of the Isetta. The need to carry four people required a longer frame, a different rear suspension, and a larger engine. A new perimeter frame was designed, using box section side members and straight tube crossmembers. The rear suspension was an independent semi trailing arm design; this was the first time BMW had used this system. The chassis had a wheelbase of 1,700 millimetres (67 in), a front track of 1,220 millimetres (48 in), and a rear track of 1,160 millimetres (46 in).

The 600 was powered by the 582 cc (35.5 cu in) flat-twin engine from the R67 motorcycle/sidecar combination. This engine, which delivered 19.5 hp (14.3 kW) at 4,500 revolutions per minute, was mounted behind the rear wheels. A four-speed manual gearbox was standard, while a Saxomat semi-automatic transmission was available. The 600 had a top speed of approximately 100 km/h.

Access to the rear seats was by a conventional door on the right side of the vehicle. United States market cars are equipped with larger, sealed-beam headlights, and large bumper overriders.

== Reception ==
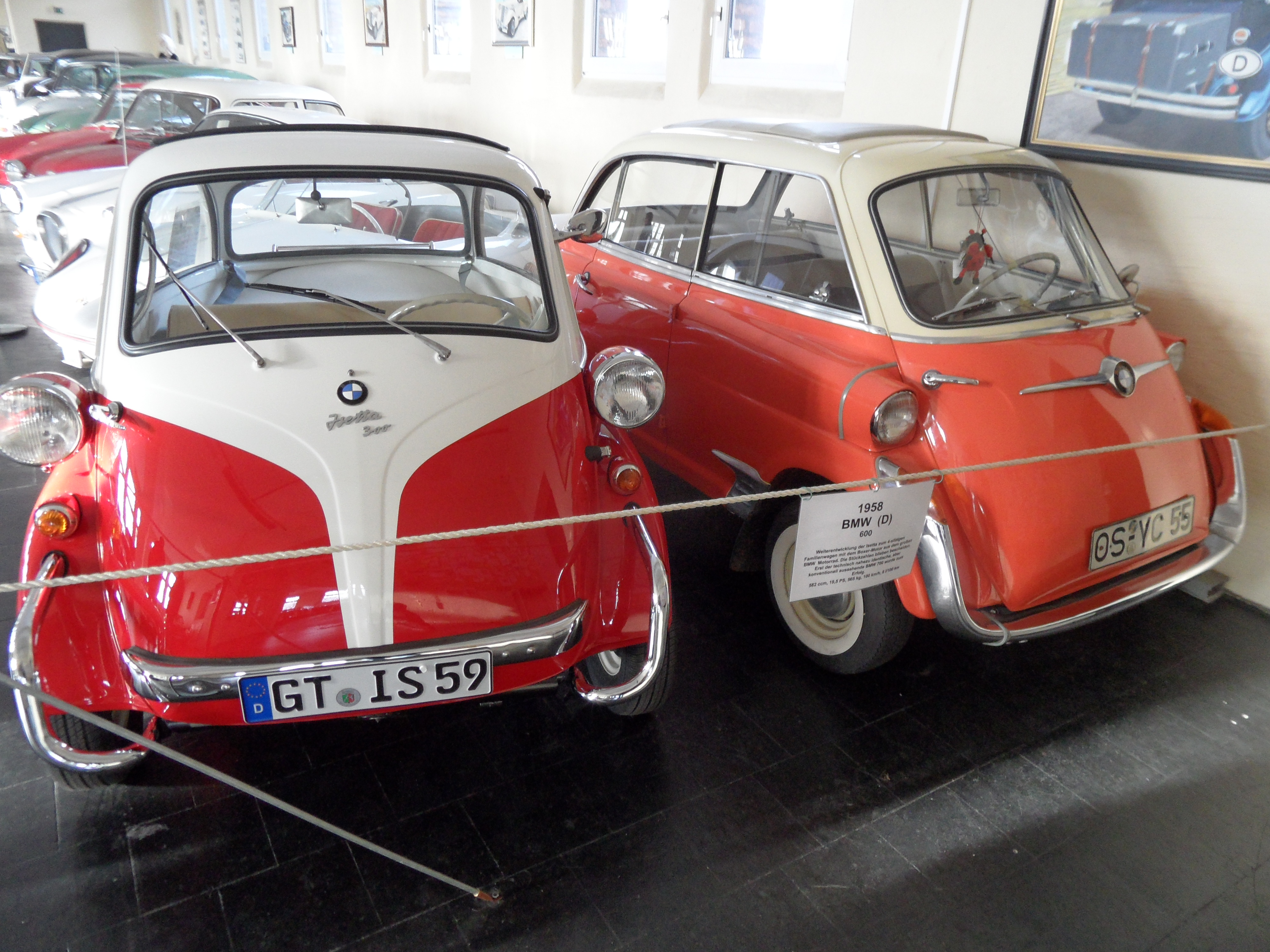
BMW Isetta 300 and BMW 600

The sales figures for the 600 did not meet BMW's expectations. During production from August 1957 to 1959, about 35,000 were built. This is attributed in part to competition with more conventional cars, including the Volkswagen Beetle. The Isetta, bubble car image also hampered sales of this larger, more upscale car.

== Legacy ==
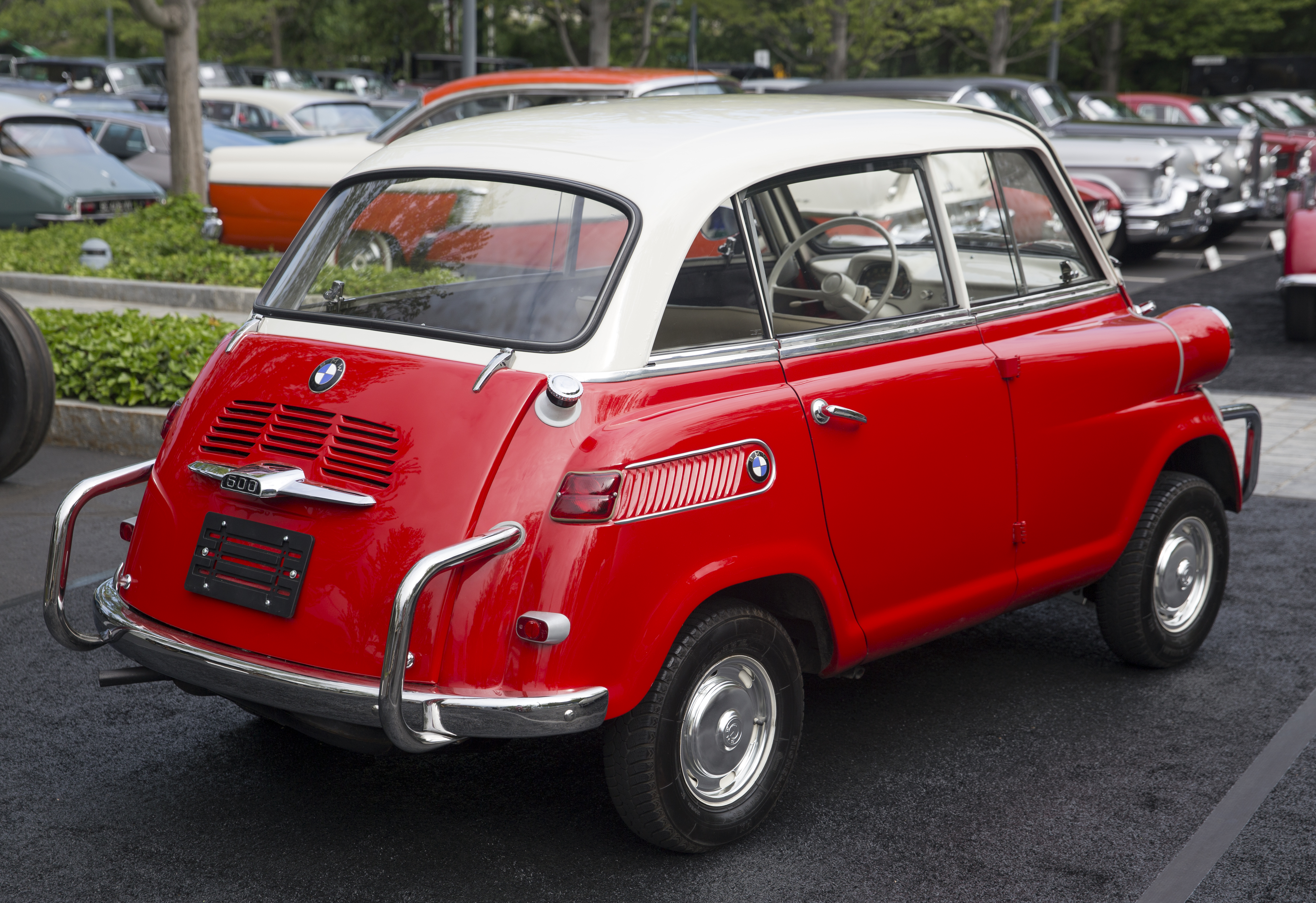
Rear view of the 600

The 600 played a direct role in the design of its successor, the BMW 700. Wolfgang Denzel, the distributor of BMW cars in Austria, commissioned Giovanni Michelotti to prepare concept sketches based on a lengthened BMW 600 chassis. Denzel presented the concept, a 2-door coupe with a slanted roof, to BMW's management. The concept was generally well received, but objections were raised about the limited passenger space. BMW decided to produce two versions, the coupe, and a 2-door sedan with a taller, longer roof.

Another legacy of the 600 was its independent semi-trailing arm rear suspension. This was BMW's first use of this suspension system and, with the exception of the BMW M1, it was used on every BMW production automobile until the 1990s. It was eventually supplanted by the "Z-axle" multi-link suspension, first introduced with the BMW Z1 in 1988. The last BMW cars with semi-trailing arm suspension were the BMW Compact and the BMW Z3.

=== Space efficiency ===
The BMW 600 was noted in magazine and journal articles as an example of space efficient design. It was noted for carrying four people within a shorter length than that of the Mini.
