= BMW 700 =

BMW 700 (E107)
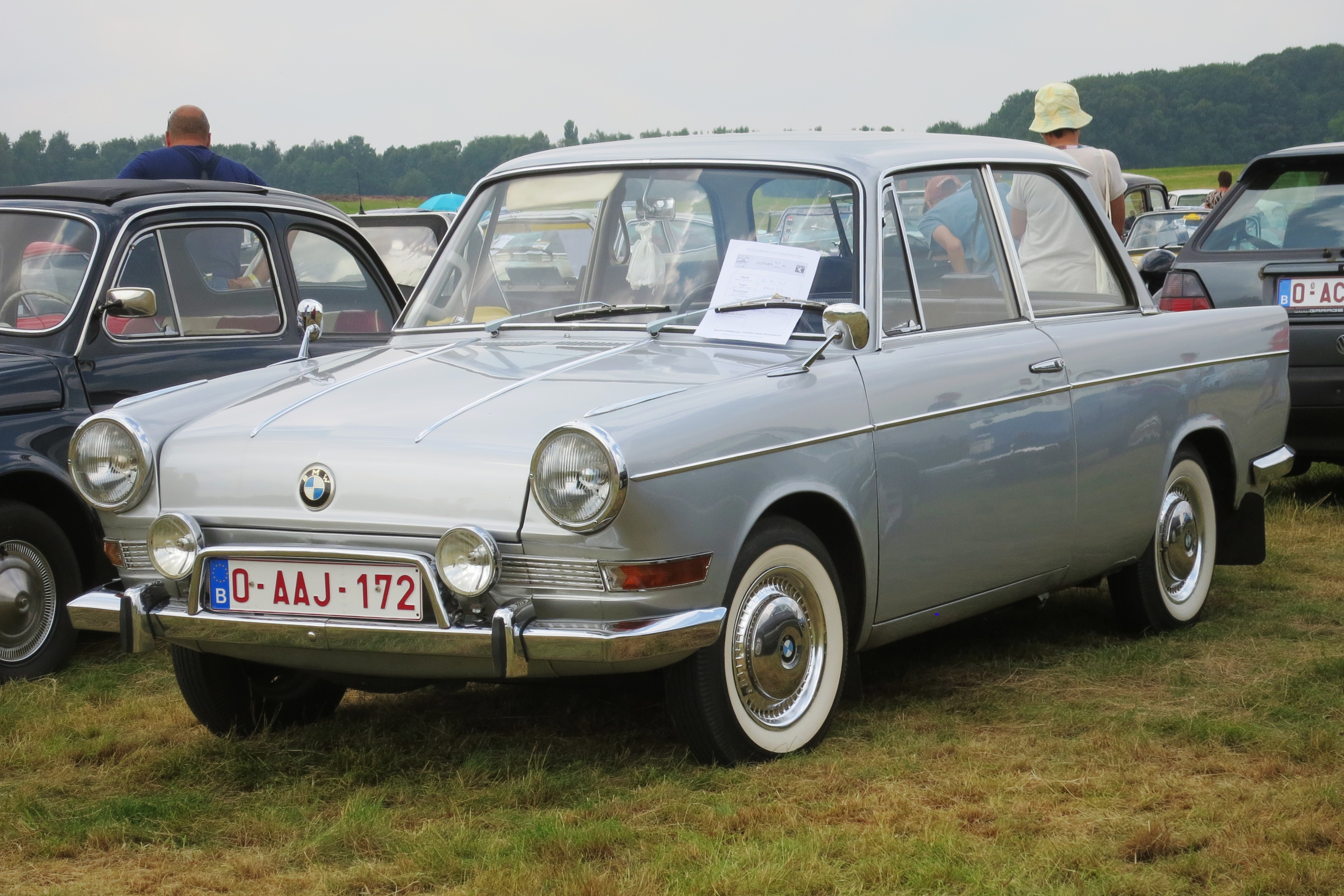
- BMW 700 saloon

Overview
- Manufacturer: BMW
- Also called: BMW LS
- Production: August 1959–November 1965; 188,211 built Saloon: 154,557; Coupé: 31,062; Convertible: 2,592
- Designer: Giovanni Michelotti

Body and chassis
- Class: Supermini; B-Segment
- Body style: 2-door saloon 2-door coupe 2-door convertible
- Layout: RR layout

Powertrain
- Engine: 697 cc Flat twin
- Transmission: 4 speed manual

Dimensions
- Wheelbase: 2,120 mm (83.5 in); LS: 2,280 mm (89.8 in)
- Length: 3,540 mm (139.4 in); LS: 3,860 mm (152.0 in)
- Width: 1,480 mm (58.3 in)
- Height: 1,270 mm (50.0 in)−1,360 mm (53.5 in)
- Curb weight: 640 kg (1,411 lb)−690 kg (1,521 lb)

Chronology
- Predecessor: BMW 600

The BMW 700 is a small rear-engined car produced by German manufacturer BMW in various models from August 1959 to November 1965. It was the first BMW automobile with a monocoque structure. The 700 was a sales success with more than 188,000 units sold, at a time when BMW was close to financial ruin. The 700 was also successful in its class in motorsport, both in its stock form and as the basis of a racing special called the 700RS. Upon discontinuing the 700, BMW left the economy car market.

== Concept, design, and engineering ==
Wolfgang Denzel, the distributor of BMW cars in Austria, commissioned Giovanni Michelotti to prepare concept sketches based on a lengthened BMW 600 chassis. In January 1958, Denzel was awarded a development contract for the 700. Denzel presented a prototype to BMW's management in July 1958. The concept, a two-door coupé with a slanted roof, was generally well received, but objections were raised about the limited passenger space. BMW decided to produce two versions, the coupe, and a two-door sedan with a taller, longer roof.

The engineer responsible for the chassis and suspension was Willy Black, who had designed and engineered the 600. The drivetrain and suspension were similar to those of the 600, with a rear-mounted flat-twin engine powering the rear wheels, Dubonnet leading arm suspension at the front, and semi trailing arm suspension at the rear. The 700 used a steel monocoque structure, and was the first BMW automobile to do so.

The engine was an enlarged version of that used in the R67 motorcycle and the 600. With a bore of 78 millimetres (3.1 in) and 73 millimetres (2.9 in) of stroke, the engine displaced 697 cc (42.5 cu in). The engine originally used a single Solex 34PCI carburetor and had a compression ratio of 7.5:1, resulting in a power output of 30 PS (22 kW).

== Reception ==
The coupé and saloon versions of the 700 were shown at the 1959 Frankfurt Motor Show. BMW's internal model code was E107, with the later cabriolet becoming the E110. After the show, BMW received 25,000 orders for 700s. Production of the BMW 700 coupe began in August 1959, with the saloon version following in December.

The large number of orders was welcome news for BMW, which was in a financial crisis. In December 1959, shareholders blocked a proposal by BMW's supervisory board to sell BMW to Daimler-Benz. The subsequent heavy investment in BMW by Herbert Quandt has been attributed in part to the success of the 700.

By April 1960, production of the 700 was at 155 cars per day. In five years of production, 188,211 BMW 700s were built.

== Development ==
The first variant of the 700 to appear after the original coupé and saloon was the 700 Sport in August 1960. Available only as a coupé, the Sport used an uprated engine with a pair of Solex carburetors and a 9.0:1 compression ratio. This brought the power output to 40 PS (29 kW) and 38 lb⋅ft (52 N⋅m) of torque. The Sport also had a rear anti-roll bar. A ribbed oil pan was used to reduce the oil temperature of the more powerful engine. The 700 Sport was renamed the 700 CS in 1963.

The 700 Cabriolet was introduced shortly after the 700 Sport, and was available only with the Sport's 40 horsepower engine. The convertible body was made by Karosserie Baur of Stuttgart. 2,592 convertibles were built.

A Saxomat semi-automatic transmission was offered as an option on 700s from September 1960.

The 700 Luxus (deluxe) replaced the original saloon in 1962. A longer wheelbase variant, the LS, was also added, extending the wheelbase by 16 centimetres (6.3 in).

In February 1963, the size of the inlet valves in the 700's base engine was increased. This increased power to 32 PS (24 kW) and 37 lb⋅ft (50 N⋅m) of torque.

The final development of the 700 was the 700 LS Coupé of 1964. This was a long-wheelbase coupé with the Sport engine. 1,730 LS Coupés were built.

Production of the BMW 700 ended in November 1965. By that time, the successful New Class cars had established themselves in the marketplace. High demand for these larger cars with larger profit margins led BMW to stop making economy cars. BMW eventually returned to the economy car market in 2002 with the Mini.

An attempt to transfer the rights to body production and export markets of the 700 to Autocars Co. in Israel in 1965 fell through. E. Illin Industries had earlier tried to start an enterprise in assembling 700s in Israel, which resulted in four 700s being assembled there in April 1963. The 700 was assembled in Argentina by Metalmecánica SAIC and sold as a De Carlo 700 Glamour until 1964; in 1964 and 1965 the same running gear was clothed with a Simca 1000 look-alike body (still with two doors) as the De Carlo SL. 9,060 examples of the Glamour and SL were assembled in Argentina. A small number of coupés were assembled there in 1961.

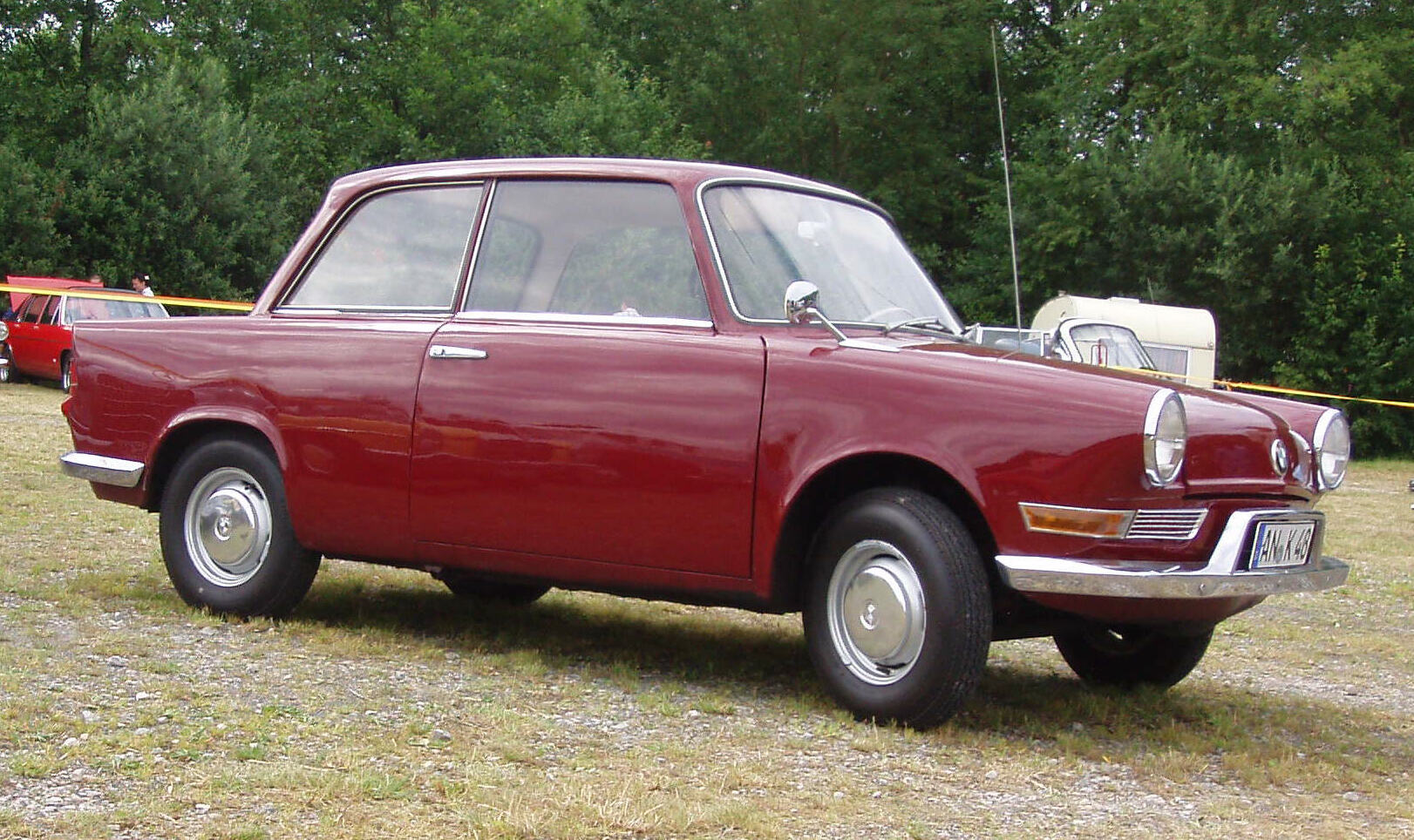
BMW 700 Saloon

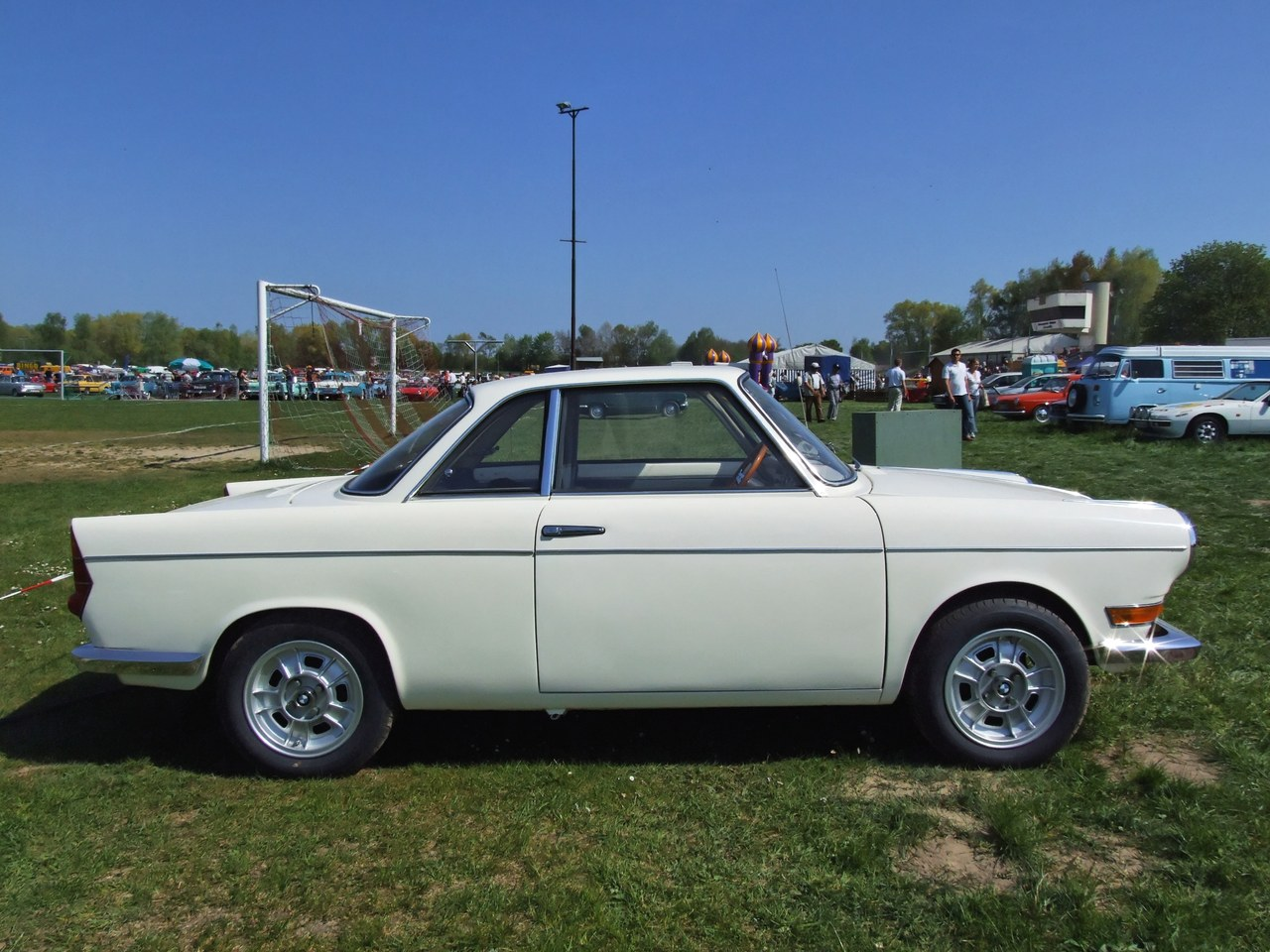
BMW 700 Sport

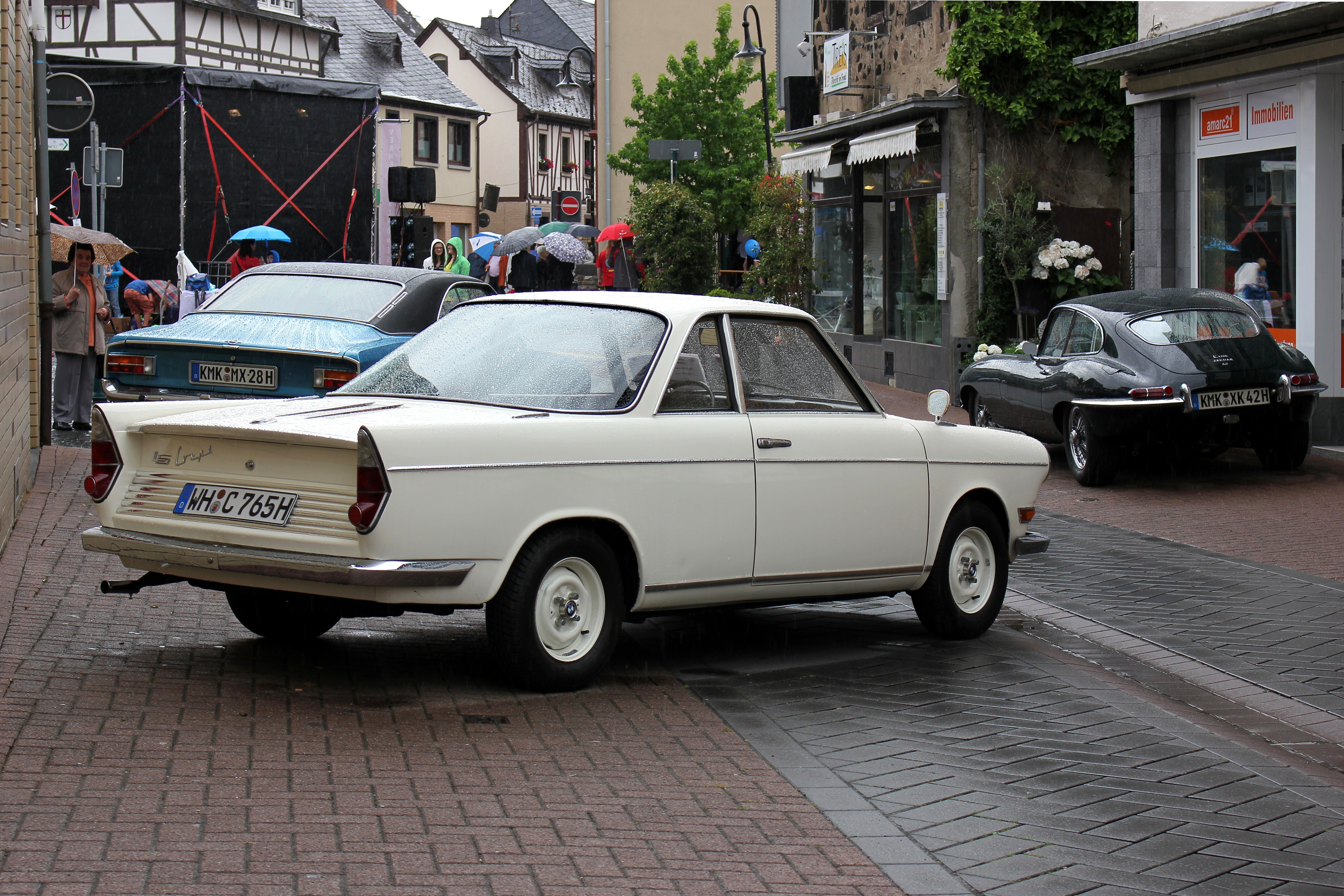
BMW 700 LS Coupé

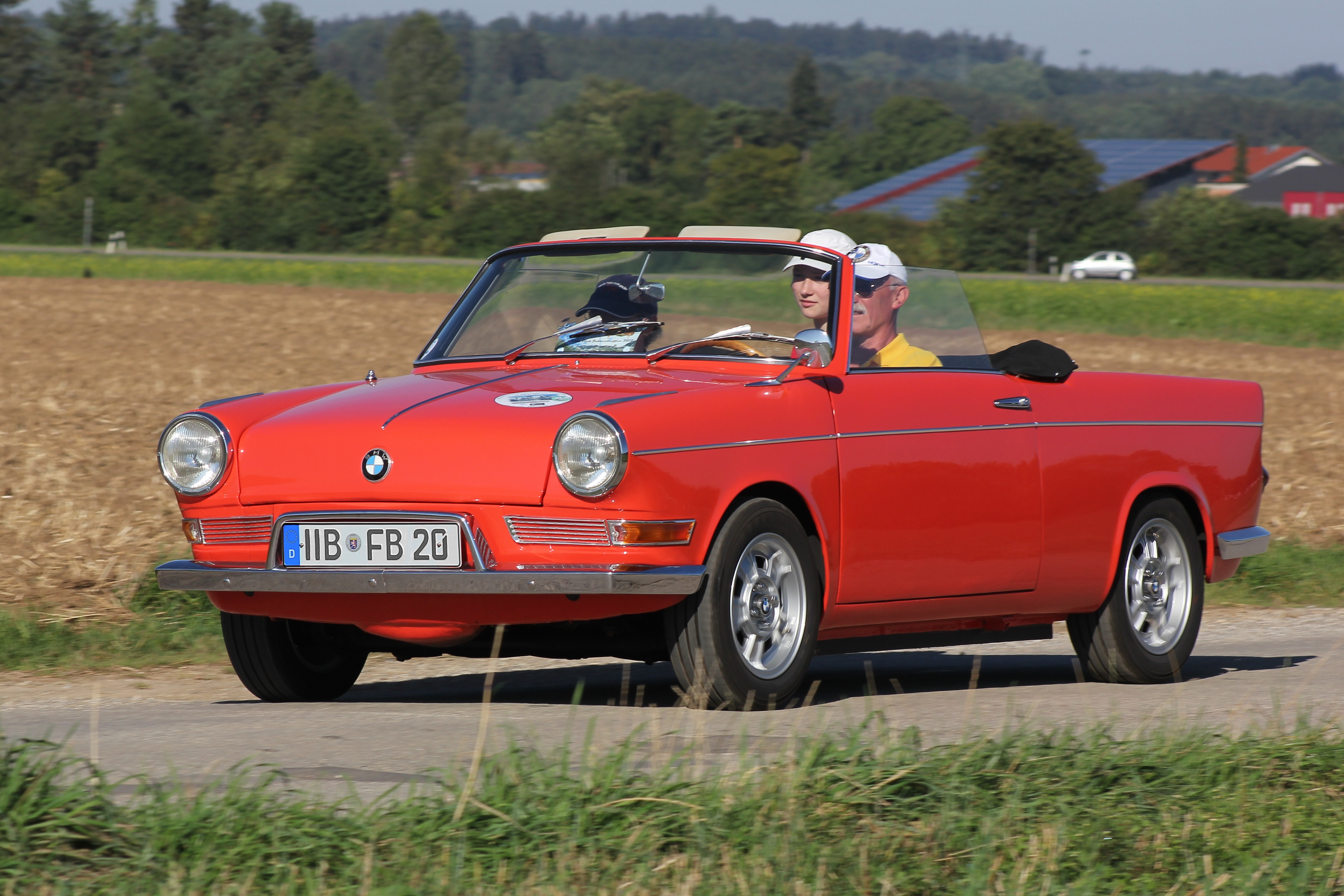
BMW 700 Cabriolet

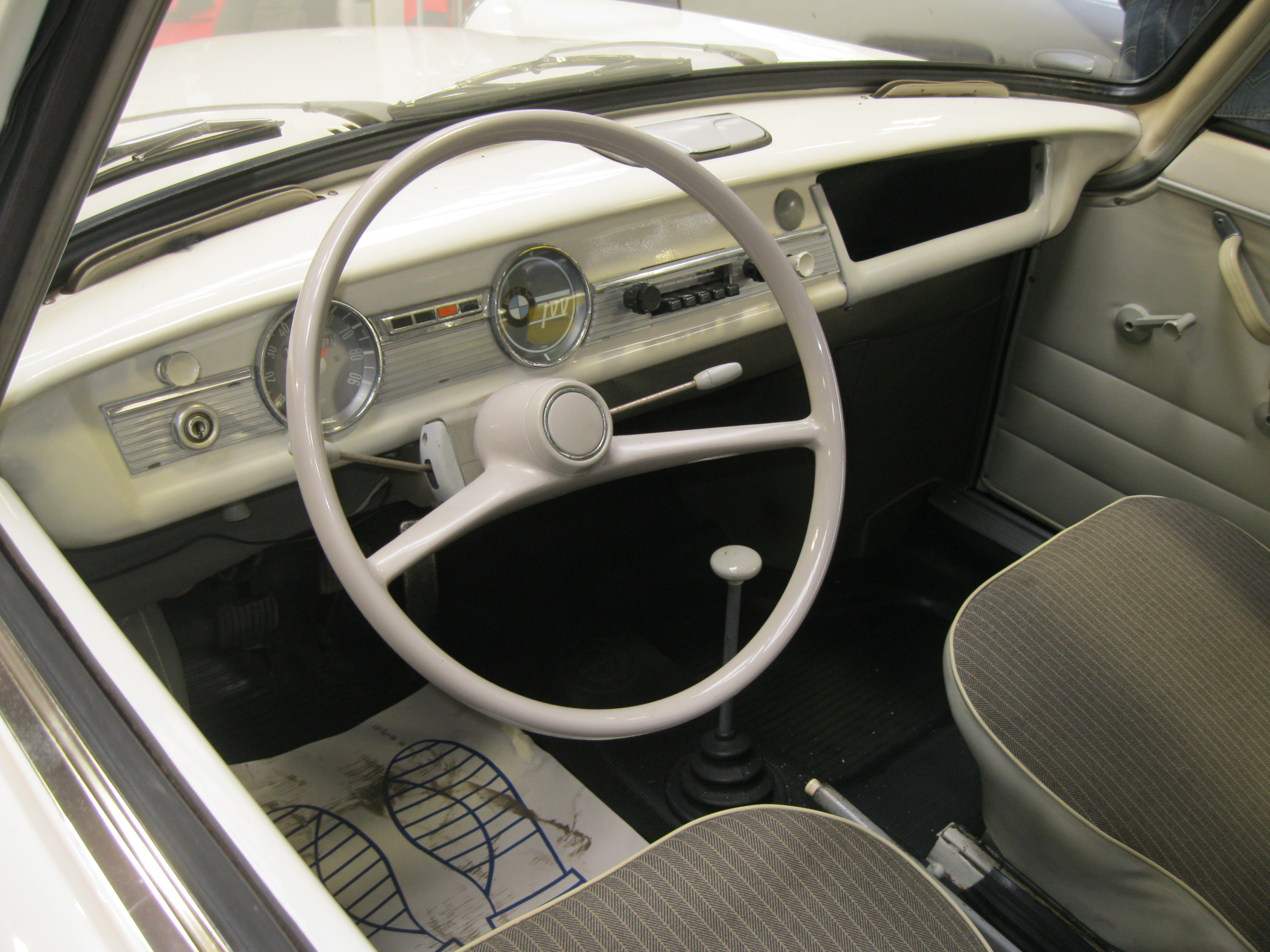
BMW 700 interior

== Motorsport ==
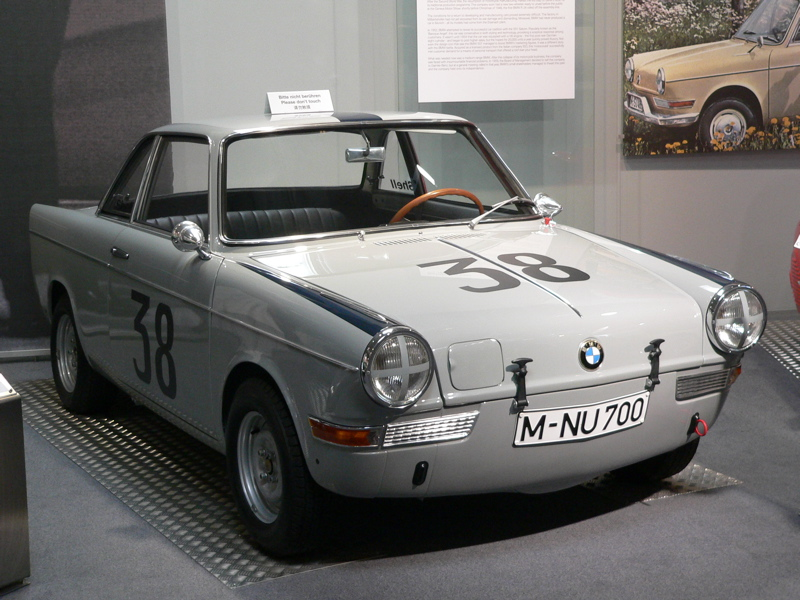
Race-prepared BMW 700 Sport

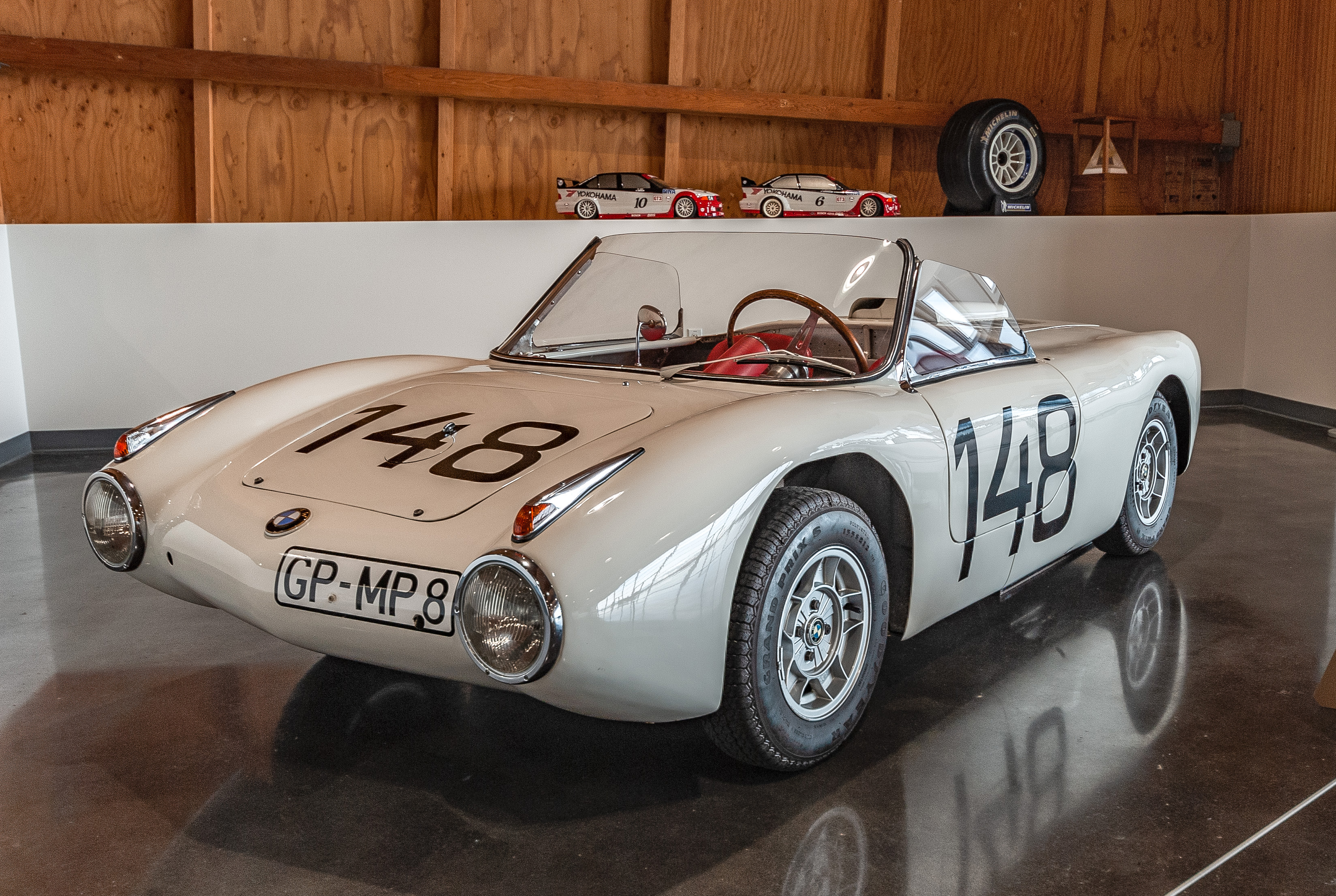
Front quarter view of a 1962 BMW 700 RS race car at the LeMay America's Car Museum

Several racing drivers competed in BMW 700s. Hans Stuck won the 1960 German Hillclimb Championship in a 700. Stuck and Sepp Grieger drove another to a class victory at the 1960 Hockenheim 12-hour race. Walter Schneider and Leo Levine raced a 700 to a class victory at the Nürburgring six-hour touring car race in 1960. Schneider went on to win the 1961 German saloon car title. Also in 1961, a BMW 700 won its class at Monza, beating their greatest rival Abarth on their home ground. Other drivers competing in 700s included Jacky Ickx, Hubert Hahne, and Alpina founder Burkard Bovensiepen.

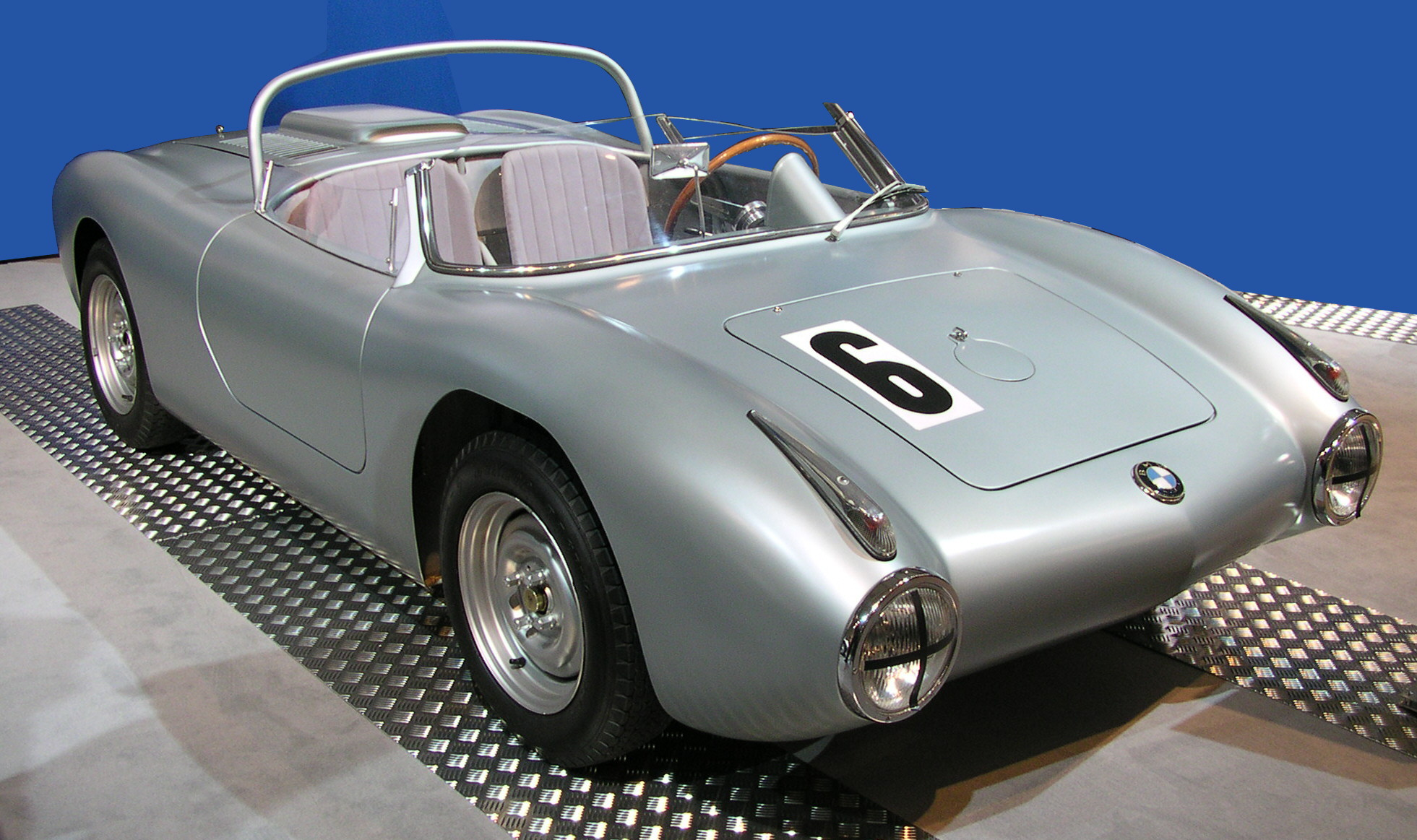
BMW 700RS

=== 700 RS ===
The 700 RS was a sports racing car based on the 700. It had a tubular frame chassis, special, lightweight, aerodynamic bodywork, and a double overhead camshaft engine tuned to 70 PS (51 kW; 69 hp). Hans Stuck campaigned the 700RS with success.
