= Goliath Rapid =

Goliath Rapid / Goliath Standard
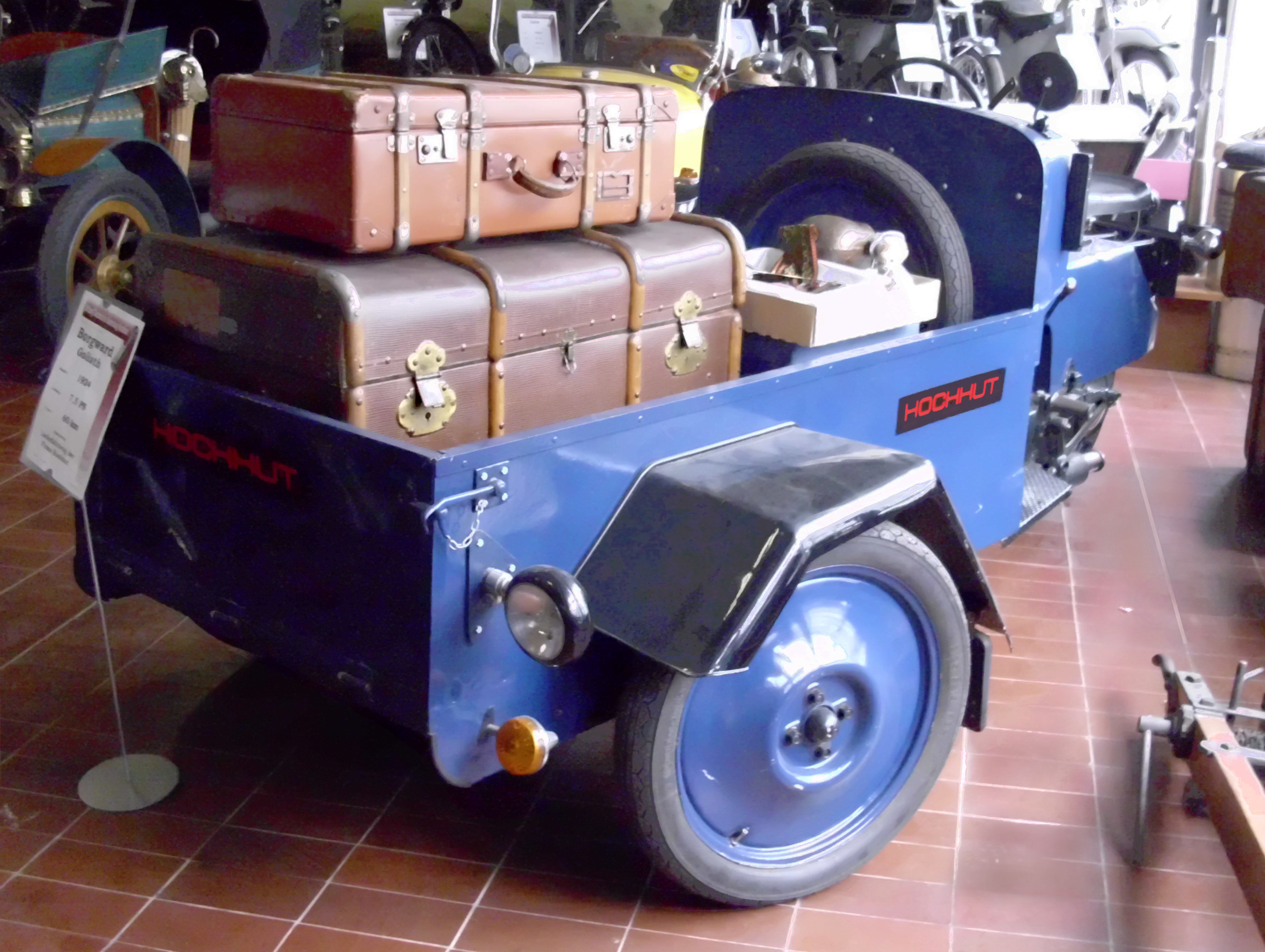

Overview
- Manufacturer: Bremer Kühlerfabrik Borgward & Co. GmbH, Bremen, Germany
- Production: Goliath Company, Bremen, Germany
- Model years: 1925 or 1926-1933
- Designer: Carl F. W. Borgward

Body and chassis
- Body style: open three-wheel cart
- Layout: Kardan MR layout

Powertrain
- Engine: two-stroke engine (4–9 PS)
- Transmission: 3 speed

Dimensions
- Wheelbase: ~ 79 in (2,000 mm)

Chronology
- Predecessor: Goliath Blitzkarren
- Successor: Goliath F400 and F200

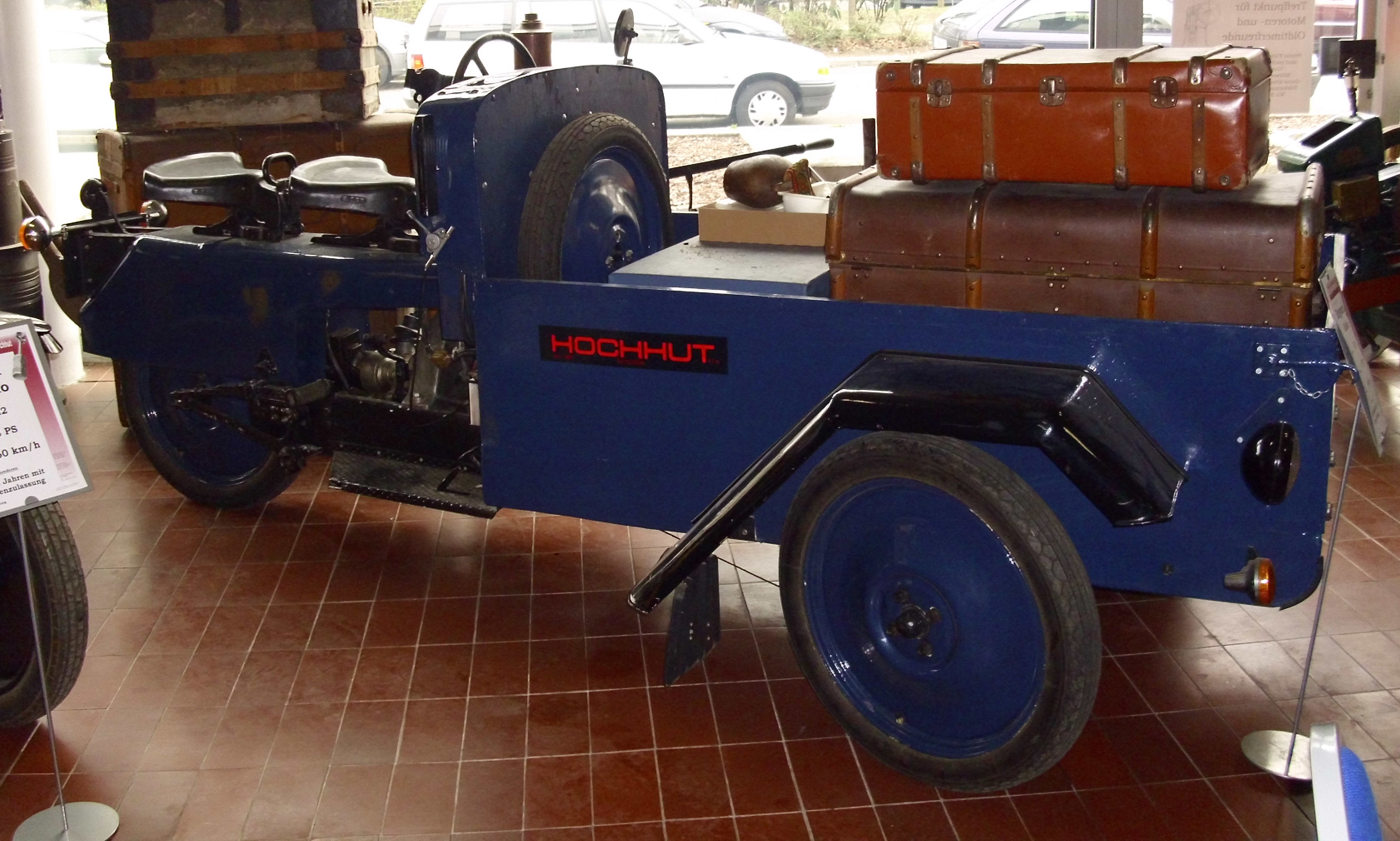

The Goliath Rapid is a lorry made by Bremer Kühlerfabrik Borgward & Co. GmbH in Sebaldsbrück (a neighborhood in Hemelingen, a suburb of Bremen, Germany). The Rapid, which technically was an improved version of the Goliath Blitzkarren, was sold under the Goliath brand name. Bordward's radiator-producing company was later renamed to Goliath-Werke Borgward & Co. GmbH.

The Rapid consists of two parts: A "cart"-like front with two steerable wheels, and a "motorcycle" rear part with a single wheel. Between cart a motorcycle, it has an orthogonal wall and a steering wheel, to control the front wheels. A windshield was offered as a factory option. The Rapid has an electric starter, a clutch, and a 3-speed gearbox with a single reverse gear. Electric lamps including a stoplight were offered as a factory option that cost RM 170; an electric horn was offered for RM 30. The maximum permissible payload is 250 kg. The Rapid is powered by an ILO-Motorenwerke-made 198 cc, single cylinder, two-stroke-engine that produces 4 PS. In 1928, a new model with an increased payload of up to 300 kg and a 250 cc, 5.5 PS engine was put into production. In 1931, the payload was increased to 500 kg. A version with a framed flatbed was offered for RM 1100; a closed freight box version was available as well, for RM 1200. Odometer or a passenger seat also offered from the factory. Carl Borgward had filed a patent on "single rear wheel drive technology". The patent was granted on 8 August 1928.

== Goliath Standard ==
In addition to the Rapid, a 500 kg freight version called Goliath Standard was put into production. It has a 350 cc single cylinder, two-stroke gasoline engine made by ILO-Motorenwerke with a rated power of 7.5 PS. Its flatbed version cost RM 1295, the "closed freight-box" version was offered for RM 1440. The Standard's top speed is 40 km/h (25 mph).

In 1931, a 750 kg freight version with a 400 cc two cylinder engine rated 9 PS cc was introduced. In 1931, prices rose to RM 1600 resp. RM 1750.

In 1933, the Standard production was ceased – the successors Goliath F200 and F400 were put into production in autumn of 1933.

== Competitors ==
- Oscar Vidal & Sohn Tempo Pony, T1 and T2, built from 1928 to 1930, a very similar vehicle
- D-Lieferwagen L-7, 1927–1930
- Later in 1932–1934, BMW produced a similar freight cart and sold it as BMW F 76 and F 79 with bigger engine. It included a passenger seat.
- Rollfix record, also late for the market
- In late 1940s til 1952 Innocenti produced the Lambretta models FA, FB and FC
- Tatra 49, 1929–1930
