= Old-timer =

Old-timer or oldtimer may refer to:

== Person ==
- Old-timer, a person of old age
- Old-timer, a veteran
- Old-timer, an eggcorn for someone with Alzheimer's disease
- Old-Timers' Day, a US baseball tradition honouring Major League retirees

== Vehicle ==
- Oldtimer, a German, Dutch, Polish and Hungarian term for a vintage, antique or classic car
  - Oldtimer Grand Prix, retro automobile racing in Austria
- Old timer, a specialized class of free flight model aircraft, for designs initially designed and flown before the end of 1942

== Other ==
- Old Timer, a brand of knives manufactured by Imperial Schrade
- Oldtimers (Pern), a group of characters in the fantasy fiction series Dragonriders of Pern
- The Oldtimers, a 1974-75 Canadian television series
