= D-Lieferwagen L-7 =

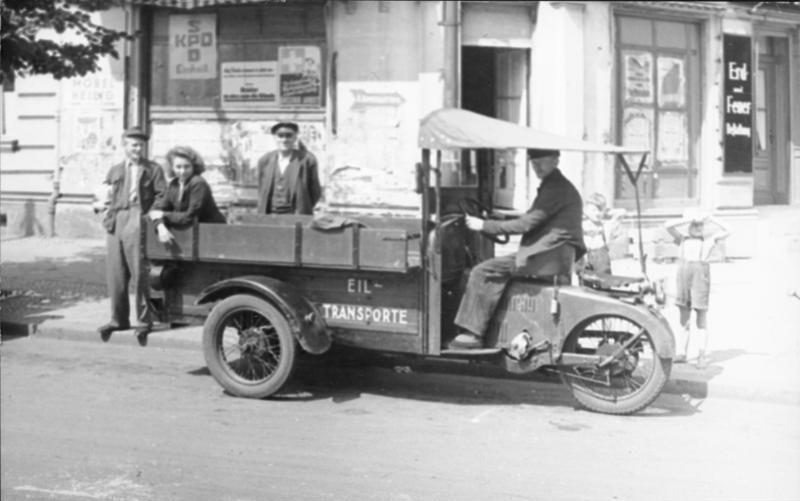
- D–Lieferwagen in Berlin in 1946

Overview
- Manufacturer: Deutsche Industriewerke AG, Berlin
- Production: 1927–1930
- Assembly: Berlin-Spandau, Germany

Body and chassis
- Body style: Pickup truck or Panel van
- Layout: MR layout

Powertrain
- Engine: 493 cc four-stroke single-cylinder, 10 PS (7,4 kW) at 4200 RPM
- Transmission: 3-speed manual

Dimensions
- Kerb weight: 136–386 kg (300–850 lb)

The D-Lieferwagen L-7 (D delivery truck L-7) was a three-wheeler pickup truck built by Deustche Industriewerke AG from 1927 to 1930 in the Berlin suburb Spandau, Germany. The vehicle was created in response to the demand for inexpensive vehicles for small and express transports in cities.

== History ==
The market success of the tricycle cars Phänomobil and Cyklonette prompted the motorcycle manufacturer Deutschen Industriewerke AG to design a three-wheeled alternative to a conventional small van. In 1927 the L-7 was introduced in flatbed and van variants, with a payload capacity of half a metric ton. In addition, a mobile market booth version was offered. The engine technology was taken from D-Rad. At a price of 1790 Reichsmark, the pickup truck was affordable for many craft businesses and small businesses.

In the late 1920s, the company faced increasing competition as more and more manufacturers launched wheel loaders; thus, the companies Zündapp, Monos, Mandernach, Rollfix-Eilwagen and Goliath entered the market. In 1928, the first tempo tricycles appeared; therefore, the production of the L-7 was stopped in 1930.

== Technical specifications ==
The Delivery truck L-7 had two front wheels between the cargo box and a chain driven single rear wheel, rivet assembled on a U-profile steel frame. It had an automobile steering wheel instead of the usual motorcycle handlebar for early vehicles of this kind.. It used 27 × 3.85 inch bicycle tires with an empty vehicle weight of 320 to 346 kg. It reached a top speed of 50 km/h (31 mph), with a fuel consumption of 6 L/100 km (39 MPG) and an oil consumption of 0.5 L/100 km. The fuel tank capacity was 12 liters or 3.1 gallons.

Options included a windshield, a soft top for the driver and a passenger seat were offered. In addition, a ball horn by Hella was available for RM 7.
