= Oldtimer Grand Prix =

The Oldtimer Grand Prix was a vintage car and motorcycle race on the Salzburgring near Salzburg, Austria that was held nine times between 1974 and 1987. It was founded by Helmut Krackowizer, an Austrian journalist and ex-motorcycle racer.

The "Oldtimer Grand Prix" on the Salzburgring in the years between 1974 and 1987, which took place nine times: 1974, 1975, 1976, 1978, 1979, 1981, 1983, 1985 and 1987. Racing drivers such as Niki Lauda, Juan Manuel Fangio and motorcycle racers such as Sammy Miller, John Surtees, Walter Zeller, Luigi Taveri, Hans Haldemann, and Georg Meier attended the event. More than 100 cars and up to 250 motorcycles participated this event each year.

== Participants ==
=== Automobile drivers ===
- Juan Manuel Fangio, five times world champion from Argentina, came in 1979 with a Mercedes-Benz Grand Prix racing car W 196 from 1955 and had been the star of the event
- Niki Lauda, the Austrian world champion in formula 1 drove a legendary Mercedes-Benz "Silver Arrow"
- Prof. Dr. Max Reisch with his Steyr Typ 100 6/32 HP, 1400 cm³, in which he drove around the world in the 1930s
- Bill Lomas, Great Britain, 1955 and 1956 world champion on Moto Guzzi
- Luigi Taveri, three times world champion from Switzerland on Honda
- John Surtees, Great Britain, the only world champion on both two and four wheels
- 1977: the Austrian Otto Mathé, Innsbruck, with his Porsche "Urahn", the Berlin-Rom-car 1940, based on VW, but never produced for the public
- 1977: Hans Herrmann, Germany, with a Mercedes-Benz-300 SLR
- 1981: the Porsche work racer Jürgen Barth
- 1981: Bosch-racing manager Jüttner

=== Motorcyclists ===
- "Wiggerl" Kraus and his "Schmiermaxe" Bernhard Huser—BMW—sidecar racer. Kraus had been German Champion five times
- Jock West, Great Britain—BMW—work racer 1937–1939
- Reinhard Hollaus, the brother of the only Austrian motorcycle world champion Rupert Hollaus, who died 1954 in training at Monza, rode the Hollaus original winning NSU Rennfox 125 cm³ from 1954
- Franz Falk from Graz, Austria
- Georg "Schorsch" Meier, from Bavaria; he rode BMW
- Fritz Walcher, winner of the first race after the Second World War in October 1946 in Salzburg-Nonntal
- the brothers Ferdinand and Edi Kranavetvogl, both motorcycle racers from Salzburg
- Siegfried Cmyral, who rode from 1929 until 1932 in the legendary supercharged Puch
- August "Gustl" Hobl—DKW—work racer in the 1950s, multiple German champion
- František Šťastný, vice world champion from Czechoslovakia
- Hans Haldemann from Switzerland, had been among the world's best racers several times with his fast Norton sidecar
- Walter Zeller, Germany—BMW—work racer, multiple German champion and one time vice world champion
- Erwin Lechner, Austria, seven times Austrian motorcycle champion
- Nello Paganini, Italy
- Fritz Walcher from Salzburg, Austria

== Vehicles ==
About 70 to 100 automobiles and around 200 vintage motorcycles appeared from throughout Europe. Among these were:

=== Automobiles ===
- 1981 a legendary "Silver Arrow" from Mercedes-Benz in which Hermann Lang became European Champion in 1939; this 3-liter supercharged racing car with around 500 HP was driven by Niki Lauda
- 1981 a 1.5-liter-four-cylinder-supercharged Mercedes-Benz 1924, the oldest car, which came from the "Deutschen Museum" in Munich and had won the Targa Florio in 1924
- 1981 a Talbot-Largo-Grand-Prix-car from 1949, the "Delahaye-Sport", driven by Prince Hohenlohe-Langenburg
- 1981 Helmut Schellenberg with his Bugatti 35 C, the winning car of Prince Lobkowitz at the Gaisbergrennen, Salzburg, in 1930 and had a spectacular crash with it

...as well as an Austro Daimler ADM 1924, DKW F1 racing car 1930, Rolls-Royce 20/25 from 1934, Mercedes-Benz 300 SL from 1952, a Staguellini Formel Junior 1959 (the Stanguellini company is based in Modena, Italy. Niki Lauda was driving such a car in his early career);

=== Motorcycles ===
- The 1981 race included for the first time a working NSU-350-cm³ from 1937 with the latest double cam shaft motor from the English engineer Walter Moore, manufacturer of the NSU-Königswellen-motorcycle until 1938—this motorcycle was restored and ridden by Heinz Metzmeier from Baden, Germany
- In 1981, the German Günther Warnecke from Bremen came with a rare 500er Rudge TT Replica 350 cm³, which was restored by him and ridden by his son
- Reinhard Hollaus rode the NSU Rennfox 125 cm³, the winning motorcycle of his brother Rupert
- 1974 Ivan Rhodes (GB) the only 500-cm³-works-Velocette still running, which was the motorcycle of Stanley Woods (GB) before 1939, 10 times winner of the TT
- 1974 Hans Wilhelm Busch (Germany) brought a 1925 eight valve V-2-Cylinder Wanderer to Salzburg
- 1987 Michael Krauser Jr. came with the ex-world champion-BMW-sidecar of Deubel/Hörner of 1961
- 1987 the fast German Erwin Bongards rode the entirely covered double cam shaft one cylinder Guzzi of 1955

Also, a Scott TT 500 of 1926, Puch 250 Sport of 1928, Megola 640 5-cylinder of 1923, DKW SS 350 of 1939 and many Rudge-bikes. The range of motorcycles started with Ariel and AJS and continued through Brough-Superior, BSA, Calthorpe, DKW, D-Rad, Douglas, Gillet Herstal, Humber, Harley-Davidson, Moto Guzzi, Megola, Norton, New Imperial, NSU, Puch, Raleigh, Rudge, Schütthoff, Standard, Velocette and Wimmer to Zenith
