= L7 =

L7 or L-7 may refer to:

== Music ==
- L7 (band), a grunge/metal band from Los Angeles, California
  - L7 (album), a 1988 album by the band
- L-Seven, a post-punk band from Detroit, Michigan

== Mathematics and technology ==
- ISO/IEC 8859-13 (Latin-7), an 8-bit character encoding
- L7, the application layer in the OSI model of computer communications
  - A layer 7 switch or load balancer
- The L^{p} space for p=7 in mathematics

== Transportation ==
=== Vehicles ===
- D-Lieferwagen L-7, a 1927–1930 German three-wheel truck
- IM L7, a 2022–present Chinese full-size luxury electric sedan
- Landsat 7, an Earth observation satellite
- Li L7, a 2023–present Chinese mid-size luxury crossover SUV
- Monocoupe L-7, a USAAF liaison aircraft
- L7 is a class of quadricycle as classified by the UNECE

=== Other ===
- L7, IATA code for Laoag International Airlines

== Other uses ==
- Royal Ordnance L7, British and NATO standard 105mm tank and light-field cannon
- L7 (machine gun), a Belgian 7.62 mm general-purpose machine gun
- Motorola SLVR L7, a mobile phone

== See also ==
- 7L (disambiguation)
- Bustin' Out of L Seven, an album by Rick James
