= F76 =

F76 may refer to:

- BMW F 76, a tricycle delivery van
- Fallout 76, a video game
- HMS Mermaid (F76), a frigate of the Royal Navy
- HMS Virago (F76), a V-class destroyer of the Royal Navy
