= BMW F 76 =

BMW F 76 / BMW F 79
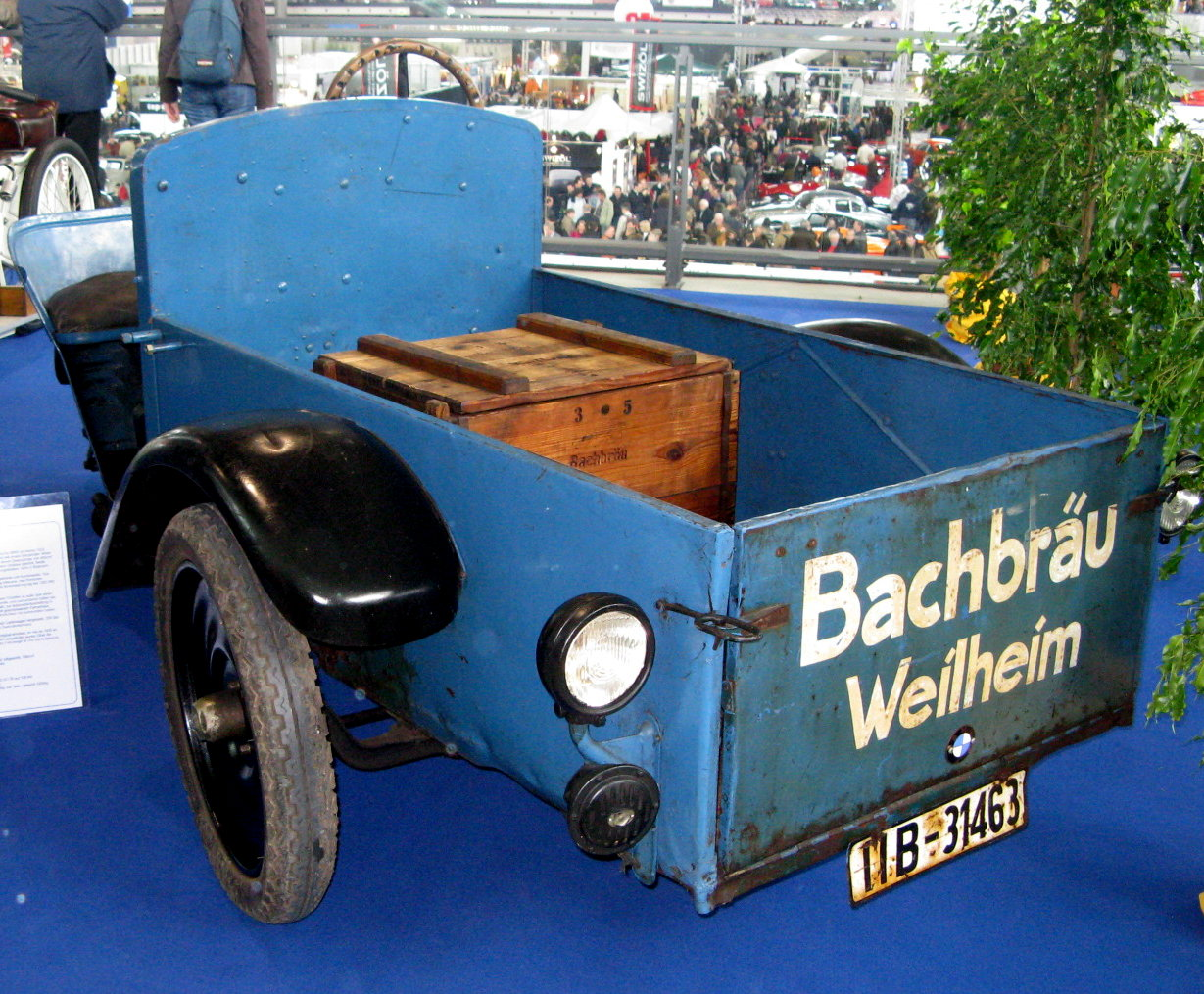
- 1933 BMW F76

Overview
- Manufacturer: BMW – Bayerischen Motoren-Werke A.G. Munich, Germany
- Production: BMW Werk Eisenach, Germany
- Model years: 1932-1934

Body and chassis
- Body style: open three-wheel cart
- Layout: Kardan MR layout

Powertrain
- Engine: 198 cc 4.4 kW two-stroke engine or 396 cc 8.8 kW
- Transmission: 3-speed manual

Chronology
- Predecessor: none
- Successor: none

The BMW F 76 was a small tricycle delivery van made by BMW between 1932 and 1933 at BMW's Eisenach plant. In 1933, the BMW F 79 version, containing a larger engine, was put into production.

== History ==
=== Development ===
The BMW 3/15's van variant did not sell very well; only 435 vehicles were sold from May 1929 to February 1932. The success of other manufacturers' three-wheeled commercial vehicles during the Great Depression made BMW Munich develop its own tricycle lorry in 1931. It had a two person bench seat and a single-cylinder motorcycle engine.

A one-seat variant had been tested as well as a passenger car, but both were not put into production.

=== Marketing ===
In autumn 1932, the F 76's production commenced at the BMW Eisenach factory. It had a 200 cc engine, and therefore, could be driven legally without a driving licence. It was priced at RM 1350.

In January 1933, the F 79 version with a 400 cc engine was introduced; it cost RM 1500.

A horn and a speedometer were standard. Windshield, wiper, cab, doors, electric turn indicators, spare wheel, and car jack were available as factory options and cost extra. Various modified versions of the freight compartment were also offered from the factory.

After a total production of just 600 units (250 F 76 and 350 F 79), the manufacture was in 1934 ceased due to low demand.

== Technology ==
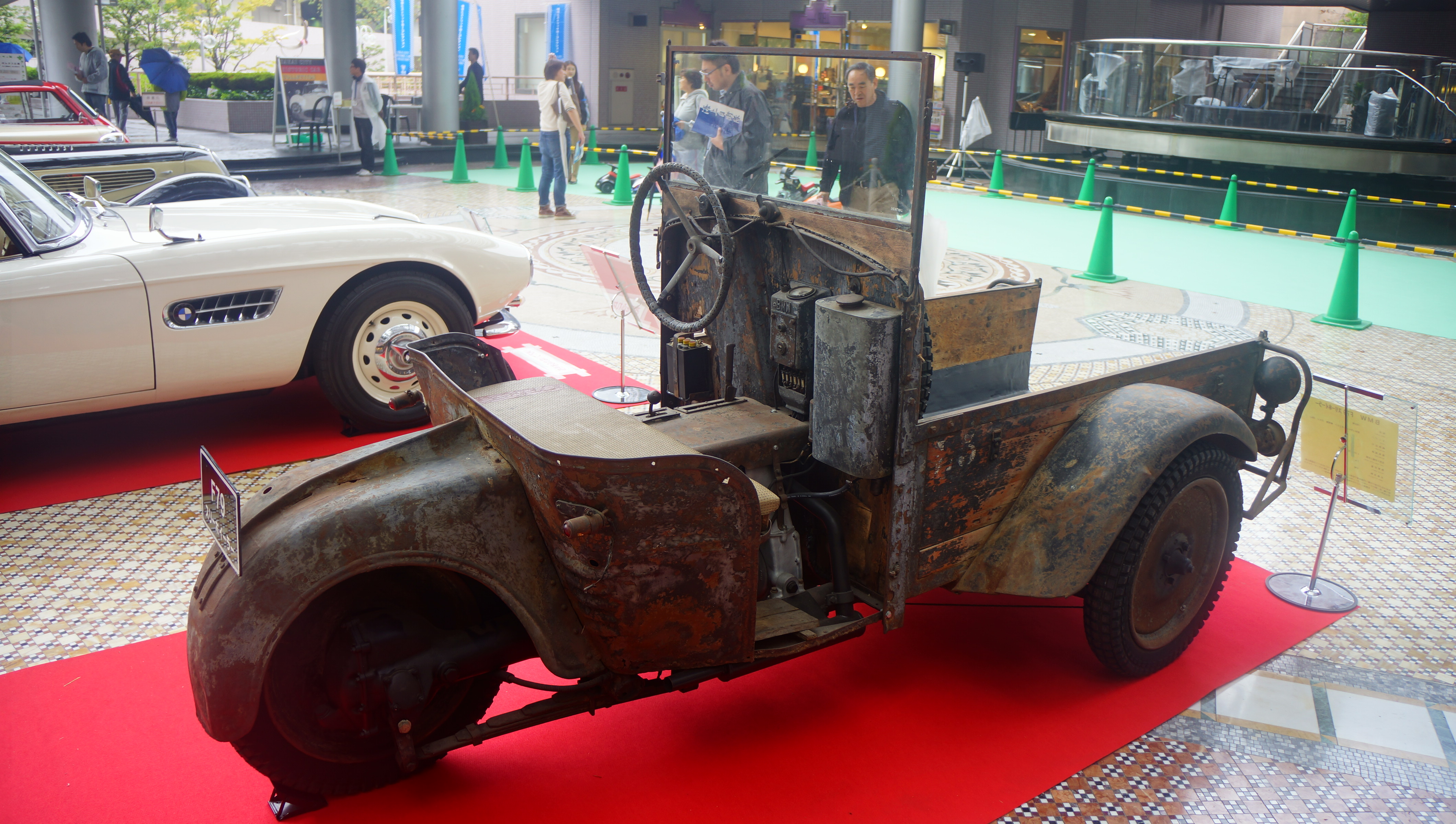
BMW F79

=== Drive construction ===
The engines used were single-cylinder four-stroke OHV engines that were derived from the BMW R 2 and BMW R 4 motorcycles.

There were at least two variants for engine cooling: a simple solution with a V-belt-driven, four-bladed fan in front of the cylinder, which was only seen on the test vehicles, and a more elaborate design with impeller on the front crankshaft stub and air baffles for cooling air, which was also described in the manuals and spare parts lists.

The engine was mated with a three-speed gearbox that contained a reverse gear and a propeller shaft to the rear wheel.

=== Chassis ===
The tricycle had only one single driven rear wheel and two steerable front wheels.

The rigid front axle was suspended by two longitudinally mounted leaf springs.

The rear wheel had a single control arm and a leaf spring, aligned longitudinally to the prop shaft.

BMW used this groundbreaking design principle again for their 1980's BMW R 80 G/S motorcycles.

The vehicle has drum brakes.

=== Construction ===
The engine was mounted underneath the driver's seat.

The permissible total weight was 650 kg (1433 lbs).

== Tech specs ==
Parameter	F 76	F 79
Engine	single cylinder four-stroke engine	
cylinder bore	63 mm	84 mm
Stroke	64 mm	78 mm
engine displacement	198 cc	398 cc
power	6 hp (4,4 kW) at 3500 rpm	12 hp (8,8 kW) at 3500 rpm
top speed	40 km/h (25 mph)	60 km/h (37 mph)
payload	345 kg (761 lbs)	340 kg (750 lbs)
max. permissible mass	650 kg (1433 lbs)	
fuel capacity	8 L (2.1 gal)	

== Competitors ==
- Goliath Rapid/Standard, production period 1926 to 1933
- Oscar Vidal & Sohn Tempo-Werk: Tempo T1 and T2, production period 1928 to 1930, a very similar motorcycle-based freight cart
- Rollfix record, also late to the market
