= Grossglockner Races =

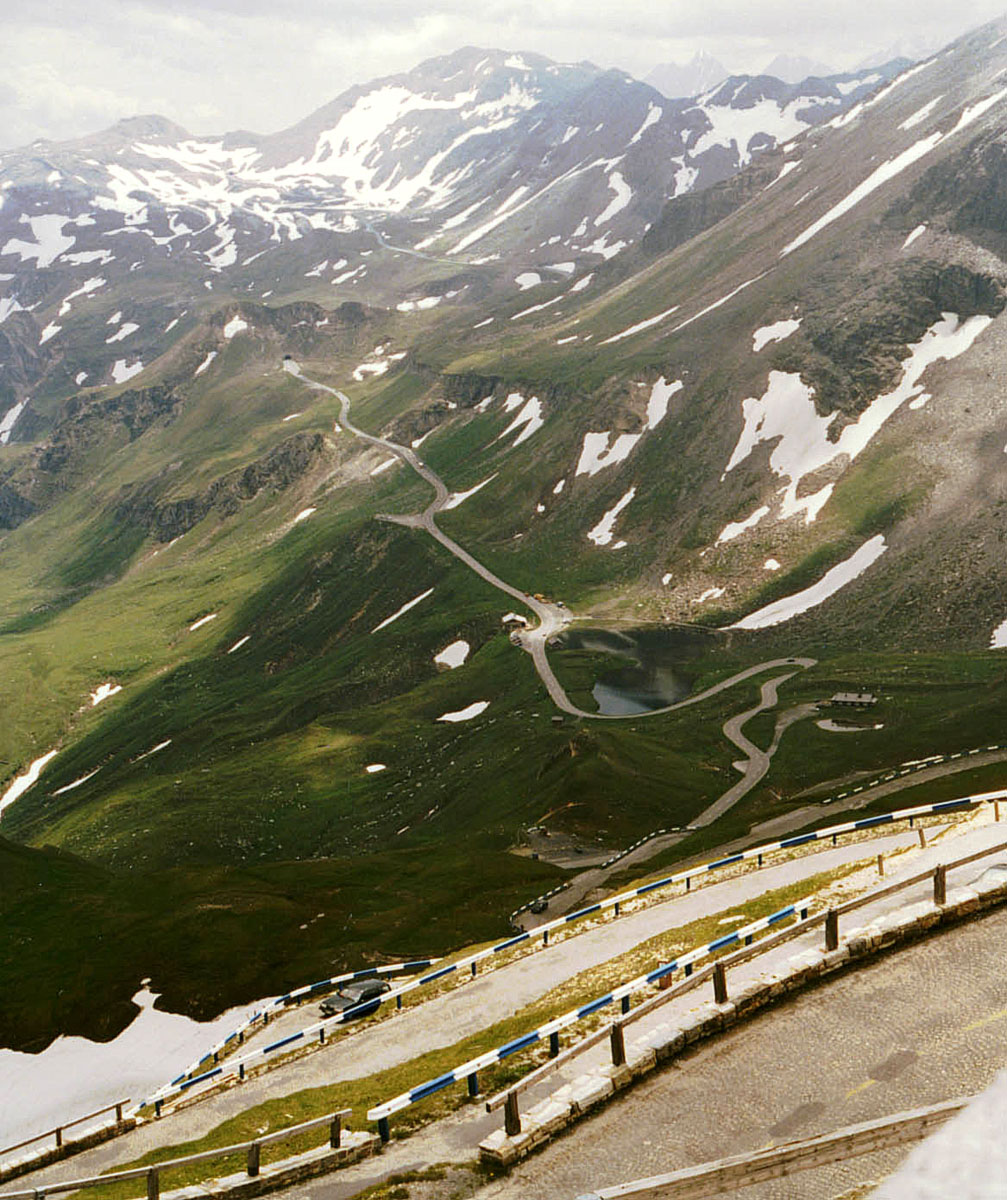
Grossglockner High Alpine Road, view to Hochtor Pass

The Grossglockner Races were hillclimbs for automobiles and motorcycles held in 1935, 1938 and 1939 on the Grossglockner High Alpine Road crossing the Central Eastern Alps in Austria.

== History ==
Hillclimbs were held in Austria since about 1900 on courses in the Vienna Woods (Exelberg Race) and at Semmering Pass, as well as on the Gaisberg mountain road near Salzburg, a venue of the European Hill Climb Championship from 1929–30. When after five years of construction the Grossglockner High Alpine Road was opened in the year 1935 as a high-altitude scenic route crossing the main chain of the Alps between the Austrian states of Salzburg and Carinthia, the High Society of the Austrian motorsport gave a powerful demonstration of its presence, including Vice-Chancellor Ernst Rüdiger Starhemberg and chief engineer Franz Wallack. The first International Grossglockner Hillclimb took place on August 4, 1935, only one day after the official opening of the road. After the Austrian Anschluss to Nazi Germany, still two further races should follow in 1938 and 1939; they had been named according to the political development Großer Bergpreis von Deutschland (Hillclimb Grand Prix of Germany).

=== Races ===
==== 1935 ====
Despite political problems under austrofascist rule, many foreign racing drivers and riders participated in this first race 1935: With their automobiles came the Italian drivers Mario Tadini and Carlo Maria Pintacuda in Alfa Romeo 8C racers from the Scuderia Ferrari, as well as Renato Balestrero and Luigi Villoresi; from Switzerland came Hans Kessler, Max Christen and Christian Kautz; the Chilean driver Juan Zanelli in a National Pescara car from Spain, Bruno Sojka and the brothers George and Zdenek Pohl as well as engineer Proskowetz from Czechoslovakia; from England Richard Seaman, Thomas Clarkes, and female racing pioneer Eileen Ellison driving a Bugatti; from the Netherlands Cornelius and Herkuleyns; from Belgium Cocagne; from France Pierre Rey and Comte de Bremond; and finally from Hungary the drivers Wilheim and Delmar.

The Austrian participation with cars was small, from Germany had been come the mountain specialists Bobby Kohlrausch with his 750-cc-supercharged-MG, Rudolf Steinweg and Walter Bäumer. The very opposite situation with the motorcycle racer: there the Austrians placed the bulk with the mountain-experienced Martin Schneeweiss, Michael Gayer, Hermann Deimel and Otto Steinfellner leading the team, while only a few foreigners had entered for the motor cycle competition. From Switzerland had come the two NSU specialists Hans Stärkle with his wife in the sidecar and Hans Kaufmann, from Italy Radames Bianchi, from Hungary Gyula Patho and from Germany Schnitzelbaumer from Munich.

The race was started in Fusch, Salzburg. On the 19.5 km (12.1 mi) long uphill race course of rolled sand, which had been still wet with rain at the beginning, the 250 cc motorcycle class was won by the Italian Bianchi on his Miller Balsamo (actual Ludwig Zangerl, Salzburg on Rudge had been the fastest but he had been disqualified due to break of regulations); in the 350 cc class the Viennese Hermann Deimel on Velocette won on an average of 72,7 km/h speed; in the half litre class Michael Gayer, likewise a Viennese, was on his work Husqvarna two cylinder successful and came on an average speed of 75,4 km/h.

The fastest motorcycle time completed by Martin Schneeweiss, who was not specialized yet at that time on speedway racing, likewise of Vienna, in the class over 500 cc. With his Austro Omega (600 cc JAP engine) he speeded up on the average of 76,5 km/h, which corresponded to a time of 15:17,57 min. The side car class had been dominated by Hans Stärkle on NSU with an average speed of 70,8 km/h.

With automobiles succeeded the best sports car time to the Scuderia Ferrari driver Carlo Pintacuda, whose Alfa Romeo made an average speed of 76,7 km/h (15:15,69 min.), only scarcely two seconds faster than the fastest motor cycle racer. The highlight of the racing cars was the race of Mario Tadini, who shot up with his Alfa, likewise from the Scuderia Ferrari, in a time of 14:42,74 min. (79,58 km/h).

Despite the absence of, at that time at the focus of the general interest, Auto Union and Daimler Benz, the Großglockner Race 1935 was a brilliant event.

==== 1938 ====
The meetings followed in 1938 and 1939 indeed brought the large work race stables to the Grossglockner Road, but the atmosphere were strongly impaired by bad weather conditions. Also the numbers of entries remained in a modest scale. Hill climb race champion Hans Stuck on Auto Union, Hermann Lang on Mercedes and Manfred von Brauchitsch participated with their automobiles, Ewald Kluge on DKW, Leonhard Fassl on NSU lined up at the start beside many other participants of the first race from 1935.

During the 1938 Glockner race, a blue touring car completed the 12.5 km Grossglockner course in 21:54.4 minutes, achieving an average speed of 34.5 km/h. The vehicle completed the course without overheating or requiring additional cooling water. The driver was Prof. Ferdinand Porsche, and the automobile was the "KdF car," Germany's Volkswagen.

Prof. Ferdinand Porsche, who ran a construction office in Stuttgart, constructed this Volkswagen on commission to the German government of the day. Prof. Porsche was then forced during the Second World War to move his factory to Gmünd in Carinthia. The first Porsche models were made there after the war. When the factory again returned to Stuttgart, he also founded the oldest Porsche workshop in Austria, the Porsche in the Alpenstraße in Salzburg. Prof. Porsche also constructed the Auto Union type C racing car, which with about 520 horse power dominated the races in the mid-1930s. This racing car was also used in the three Glockner races.

Grossglockner on August 26, 1938. The field of participants was not very large – motor-sport was simply very expensive! Sepp Hofmann from Salzburg on a private BMW 500 R 51 SS provided one of the two sensations among motorcycle-racing participants in the second Grossglockner race.

The first was that Ewald Kluge (Germany) rode in suboptimal weather, used a 250cc DKW racing motorcycle, and achieved the best motorcycle time of 68.45km per hour and thus became the “German Hill Climb Champion”. The “German Hill Climb Champion” title was given to the rider achieving the best overall time, independent of the racing class. Kluge rode up the mountain in an overall time (two heats) of 22:05.20 minutes. The second sensation was that the private rider, Sepp Hofmann, with an overall time of 24:38.20 minutes, won in the half-litre class ahead of the DKW works rider, Bungerz.

The course length in 1938 was 12,5 km; one drove twice from the Ferleitentoll gate to the Fuscher Törl. As the winner of the 350cc class, brand colleague Sissi Wünsche (Germany), achieved a time of only 23:12,1 minutes. This was because bad weather hindered fast riding during the event. The newly minted European dirt-track champion, Martin Schneeweiss from Vienna, Austria, disappointed the spectators. He had been taken into the BMW works team that year, but could not get along with the supercharged boxer. He already had “dismounted” in the Grand Prix of Germany in Hohenstein, which also happened to him on the Grossglockner.

Hans Stuck became the “German Hill Climb Champion” in an Auto Union with an overall time of 20:10 minutes (74,67 km per hour) ahead of Hermann Lang and Manfred von Brauchitsch (both in Mercedes-Benz).

==== 1939 ====
The course on the north side of the Glockner Massif with a maximum gradient of 12% covers an altitude difference of 1.285m. But because the start itself was at 1.145 m, and the highest point at 2.400 m, a worsening of engine performance became evident due to the thin air. Weather conditions can quickly change in Grossglockner. Thus the third and last event on the mountain, on August 6, 1939, suffered severely under this capriciousness.

During training, in dry weather, Hans Stuck drove in an Auto Union and at 8:59,6 minutes set a new record (84,7 km per hour). Among the motorcycles it was always the DKW racing motorcycles that achieved the fastest training times.

On the day of the race the Grossglockner showed its worst climate change. Following grey thunderstorms in the morning, the high-summer weather prevailed at noon, but at the start of the race this turned into rain and fog. The fog was so thick that visibility was barely 20 meters. The average speed then, provided the details all too clearly: Martin Schneeweiss (DKW), winner of the 250cc class - 63,04km per hour – beating DKW works rider Walfried Winkler; Leonhard Faßl (NSU), winner of the 350cc class - 62,87km per hour; Georg Mittenwald (DKW), winner of the 500cc class - 66.85km per hour, the fastest sportscar time was driven by Polensky from Berlin in a BMW (67,45km per hour), among the racing cars it was Hermann Lang in a Mercedes-Benz with 75,09km per hour, who as the overall winner became the German Hill Climb Champion. Hans Stuck in an Auto Union achieved second place with a record of 74,88km per hour.

The Second World War in the following days after the event and the Grossglockner has never again, conquered in race speed.

==== International Six Days' Trial ====
The International Six Days Trial featured time checkpoints on its events on the Grossglockner when in this part of Europe. Most famously was the ISDT of 1939 which was brought to an unceremonious end by the declaration of World War 2 that had caused a number of allied nations, in order to pre-empt the problem, had an early retirement from the event. Later the FIM annulled the result of that event which the host nation Germany won.

=== Post-war ===
Today, the regular traffic has become too dense to close this road for a weekend. Also, the safety requirements would not have to be brought in harmony with the conditions to be found along the road.

On 1985, at the occasion of the fiftieth anniversary of the existence of the road, it came again to a meeting of motor sport enthusiasts at the Grossglockner: About 100 automobiles and motorcycles from the time before 1940 met there. Among the attendees were Hans Hermann with the Mercedes W 196, Silver arrow, joined the meeting, Professor Dr. Helmut Krackowizer came and was highly pleased about reviving of an old past time - despite the bad weather conditions.

Since 2002, there had been a regularity race for historical racing motorcycles up to vintage 1961 in memoriam Prof. Dr. Helmut Krackowizer who died in 2001, the "Grossglockner Trophy Memorial Prof. Dr. Helmut Krackowizer". It took place every two years for three times (2002, 2004 and 2006).

The Grossglockner 2012 Grand Prix took place in September 2012.

== Sources ==
All sources are written in German

- Salzburgwiki Race 1935, with articles in newspapers and magazines with internetlink to ANNO - digitized newspapers and magazines from the Austrian National Library
- Salzburgwiki Race 1938, with articles in newspapers and magazines with internetlink to ANNO - digitized newspapers and magazines from the Austrian National Library
- Salzburgwiki Race 1939, with articles in newspapers and magazines with internetlink to ANNO - digitized newspapers and magazines from the Austrian National Library
