= 7L =

7L may refer to:

- Sun D'Or, a former IATA code
- DJ 7L, stage name of George Andrinopoulos of 7L & Esoteric
- 7L, the type number of the Volkswagen Touareg sports utility vehicle
- MG 7L, a model of MG 7
- Soyuz 7L, see Soyuz 7K-L1
- 7L, the production code for the 1988 Doctor Who serial The Happiness Patrol

== See also ==
- L7 (disambiguation)
