= Hoerner =

Hoerner or Hörner is a surname that may refer to:

Spelled as Hoerner:

- Dan Hoerner (born 1969), American guitarist, vocalist, and author
- Dick Hoerner (1922–2010), American football player
- Hanna von Hoerner (1942–2014), German astrophysicist and businessperson
- Joe Hoerner (1936–1996), American baseball player
- John Hoerner (born 1939), British businessman.
- Nico Hoerner (born 1997), American baseball player
- Sebastian von Hoerner (1919–2003), German astrophysicist and radio astronomer
- Sighard F. Hoerner (1906–1971), engineer and writer on aerodynamics

Spelled as Hörner:

- Johan Hörner (1711–1763), Swedish-Danish painter
- Silke Hörner (born 1965), German breast stroke swimmer
