= Blitzkarren =

Overview
- Manufacturer: Bremer Kühlerfabrik Borgward & Co. GmbH, Bremen, Germany
- Production: Bremer Kühlerfabrik Borgward & Co. GmbH, Bremen, Germany
- Model years: 1924–1927
- Designer: Carl F. W. Borgward

Body and chassis
- Body style: open three-wheel cart
- Layout: MR layout

Powertrain
- Engine: 1.6 kW 1R two-stroke engine
- Transmission: none
- Propulsion: V-belt

Dimensions
- Curb weight: Maximum Load: 0.25 t

Chronology
- Predecessor: none
- Successor: Goliath Rapid and Goliath Standard

The Blitzkarren (German transl. lightning cart) was a cab-less tricycle freight cart based on a motorcycle. It was produced in 1924 as the first complete production vehicle manufactured by the Bremer Kühlerfabrik Borgward & Co. GmbH. The company, located in Sebaldsbrück, a settlement in Hemelingen, Bremen, Germany previously produced radiators and fenders for Hansa-Lloyd. Between 1929 and 1931 Hansa-Lloyd was acquired by Carl Borgward and his co-investor Wilhelm Tecklenborg. Borgward also renamed his radiator manufacturing company to Goliath-Werke Borgward & Co. GmbH.

In 1924, responding to a designer complaining about the material transport for radiator production between the workshops by handcart, Borgward constructed this light truck. In difficult economic times before the Great Depression Borgward discovered a gap in the market. There was a great demand from traders and small business owners for affordable motorized freight carts, that were legal to drive without a license. A Blitzkarren cost 980 Reichsmark. In 1929, a quarter of the licensed commercial vehicles were made in Bremen. Carl Borgward had patented the Blitzkarren division. The patents were granted on June 20, 1925 in Germany, and on March 11, 1926 in England. Previously there had been similar tricycles used as passenger transporters, usually single-seater.

Blitzkarren had neither clutch nor starter. The two-stroke motorcycle engine, under the flatbed, was coupled over a V-belt on the left rear wheel and was pushed to start, and choked to stop, which was not difficult from the driver seat in the rear of a 250 kg payload vehicle on a flat road. The single front wheel was mounted in a motorcycle fork, which was controlled from the rear.
