= Hubert M. Meingast =

Austrian engineer and scientist (1911–1961)

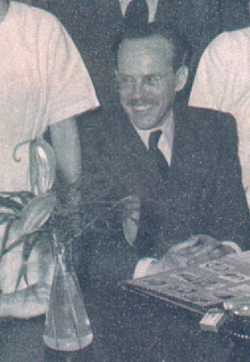
Hubert M. Meingast in 1952

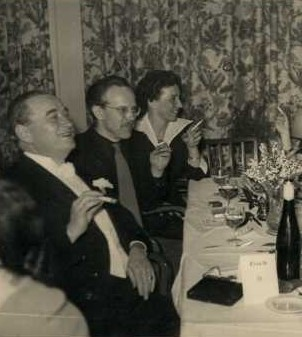
Carl F.W. Borgward (left) and Hubert M. Meingast (second from left)about 1950

Hubert Michael Meingast (June 28, 1911 – August 29, 1961) was an engineer and scientist who worked for the Borgward group, based in Bremen.

Meingast was born in Ebelsberg, Austria in 1911. After intensive training to become an engineer, he went to work in Bremen for Carl F. W. Borgward.

During and after WWII, Meingast, in association with mentor Dr. Paul Riebensahm of the Technische Hochschule in Charlottenburg (now Technische Universität Berlin), was involved in founding two research organizations concerning the heat treatment of metals: Die Arbeitsgemeinschaft Wärmebehandlung und Werkstofftechnik e. V. - AWT (Association for Heat Treatment and Material Science) and Institut für Härterei-Technik (Institute for Material Science). He taught at the Institute and wrote research papers. One research paper Meingast authored was described as containing ideas that were being referenced by engineers 20 years later upon his death in 1961 ("Ein Vortrag, der ein aussergewohnliches Interesse fand und dessen Abdruck auch heute noch, fast 20 Jahre spater, fur viele Leser wichtige Hinweise enthalt."). His ideas have been described as being very advanced for their time ("Seine Ideen, seine Vorschlage waren oft erheblich ihrer Zeit vor-aus, seine Arbeiten – besonders aus den Jahren 1942 bis 1950 – zum Teil bahnbrechend."), especially between 1942 and 1950 .

In 1952 Meingast emigrated to Canada. After working as an engineer for the Cockshutt Farm Equipment Company in Brantford, Ontario, Canada, he joined the Harold Jones Machine Company in Thornbury, Ontario in 1957 as vice-president. In this position he was responsible for the design work of manufactured products. During this time he did consulting work for mining companies in South Africa. In 1958, he became an owning partner in the business and the company was renamed JMG (Jones, Meingast, Gardiner). It was later called Teledyne. This company manufactured specialized mining equipment. It is still existent in Thornbury under new ownership and is called BTI - Breaker Technology Inc.

Late in 1959, Meingast founded a business in Owen Sound, Ontario, manufacturing hydraulic cylinders (hydraulic machinery). It was named H.M. Meingast & Sons Ltd . This business was purchased by Parker Hannifin Corporation in 1965 and was operating in Owen Sound until 2006, when it was closed.

Meingast died of lung cancer on August 29, 1961 in Toronto, Ontario, Canada.

His eldest sister was the actress Erika Meingast. His eldest brother was the writer Fritz Meingast, who received the prestigious Bayerische Poetentaler award in 1984.
