= Carl F. W. Borgward =

German engineer and designer (1890–1963)

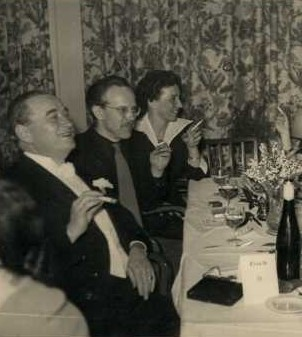
- Carl F. W. Borgward (left) and Hubert M. Meingast (second from left) around 1950
- Born: 10th November 1890; Altona, Hamburg
- Died: 1963 July 28; Bremen
- Education: Hannover Technical University
- Occupations: German engineer and designer

Carl Friedrich Wilhelm Borgward (10 November 1890 in Altona, Hamburg – 28 July 1963 in Bremen) was a German engineer and designer and the creator of the Borgward group, based in Bremen.

== Biography ==
He was of modest origin, the son of coal retailer Wilhelm Borgward, and had twelve brothers and sisters. He undertook mechanical engineering studies, and obtained his engineering degree from Hannover Technical University in 1913.

He was wounded during World War I. In 1919 he became one of the partners of Bremer Reifenindustrie. The company was restructured and in 1920 became Bremer Kühlerfabrik Borgward & Co.

In 1924 and 1925 the company started to produce the small three-wheel trucks Blitzkarren and Goliath. With his partner Wilhelm Tecklenborg, in 1928 he created the company Goliath-Werke Borgward & Co. When the two associates took over Hansa-Lloyd-Werke in 1931, this became the Borgward Group.

On 23 September 1938 the Carl F. W. Borgward Automobil- und Motorenwerke factory was opened in Sebaldsbrück near Bremen. At that time the company had 22,000 employees. Until the end of the war the production of Borgward was primarily military vehicles.

When the factory was destroyed by bombing in 1944, half of the workers were prisoners of war and forced laborers. Carl Borgward was interned until 1948. One year after being freed, he was again a member of the Chamber of Commerce and Industry of Bremen.

In 1949, the first Lloyd LP 300 had been designed and produced. In Germany this car was nicknamed the Leukoplastbomber (Band-aid Bomber). The small car with a plywood body on a wooden chassis had a two-stroke engine and was in the market segment under the Volkswagen Beetle, and kept this position over a decade.

In 1949 Borgward had presented the large Hansa sedan, which was the first post war German car with a pontoon body. He had taken ideas from American magazines, which he read when under detention.

The largest success came in 1954 with the Borgward Isabella. The Borgwards met the spirit of the time: the German customers wished for American-type styling and chrome decoration with European compact dimensions. Borgward participated in detail in the design of all the car models.

Increased competition on the segment of mid-sized cars, and the broad and uneconomical range of models, as well as poor financial and tactical choices by management, led the company into crisis at the end of the 1950s. The new model Borgward-Lloyd Arabella should have eased the difficulties, but was handicapped by quality problems.

In 1961, Borgward underwent one of the most spectacular bankruptcies in the history of Germany. The company went to the Land of Bremen, which had it liquidated, and part of the factory went to Hanomag. Years after the bankruptcy was closed, it came out that it had not been reasonable: All debts had been paid to the last cent.

Carl Borgward died of a heart attack at the age 72 on 28 July 1963.

His life work might continue: 50 years after closing, his grandson, Christian Borgward, together with his partner Karlheinz L. Knöss and with assistance from Chinese investors unveiled the company's first new car in over 40 years, the BX7 at the 2015 International Motor Show in Frankfurt.
