= Jüttner =

Jüttner is a surname. Notable people with the name include:

- Hans Jüttner (1894–1965), high-ranking functionary in the SS of Nazi Germany
- Jörg Jüttner (born 1941), German sprinter
- Josef Jüttner (1775–1848) Austrian army general and cartographer
- Robert Jüttner (born 1959), German footballer
- Wolfgang Jüttner (born 1948), German politician

== See also ==
- Maxwell–Jüttner distribution, is the distribution of speeds of particles in a hypothetical gas of relativistic particles
- Christian Juttner (1964–2024), American film and television actor
