= Sighard F. Hoerner =

Sighard F. Hoerner (18 April 1906, in Münster, Germany – 22 June 1971, in Brick Town, USA) was a German-American scientist. An important figure in the aerodynamics field, he is known for his two compendiums of aerodynamic knowledge, Fluid-Dynamic Drag and Fluid-Dynamic Lift. He is also notable for his design work on the pioneering STOL aircraft, the Fieseler Fi 156 Storch.

== Education ==
Hoerner studied mechanical engineering at the Technical University of Munich, earning a Dipl.Ing. and he earned a degree as Dr.-Ing. in aerodynamics at the Institute of Technology at Braunschweig. Finally, he obtained a degree as Dr.-Ing.-habil. from the TH Berlin.

== Career ==
Initially, he served as research assistant at the Deutsche Versuchsanstalt fur Luftfahrt (DVL, near Berlin). After this, he worked as an aerodynamicist at the Fieseler Corporation, where he worked on the aerodynamic design of the Fieseler Fi 156 Storch STOL aircraft. From there, he went to Junkers, where he worked as the head of design aerodynamics, before going to Messerschmitt, where he worked as a research aerodynamicist during World War II. After the war, he was "invited" (Operation Paperclip) to emigrate to the United States, where he worked in aerodynamics at Wright Field in Ohio. Eventually, he ended up working as a specialist in aerodynamics and hydrodynamics in the field of naval architecture at Gibbs & Cox, Inc. in New York City.

== Contributions ==
In 1945 and 1946, Hoerner prepared a manuscript for the book Aerodynamic Drag. The technical publishing houses in New York City were not confident enough to bring a book as specialized as this to the market. As a result, he published the book himself in 1951, using a photo-offset process and sold copies of the book by mail order from his home. The book got very good reviews and demand was steady. In 1958 it was reissued as Fluid-Dynamic Drag. With the rapid progress in aerodynamics over the years, he prepared an update to the book, which was published in 1965. As before, the book was self-published by Hoerner Fluid Dynamics. This book contains documentation of the worldwide knowledge (at the time) of the sources of aerodynamic drag and the means to quantify aerodynamic drag. While substantial knowledge on this subject has been learned since 1965, this book is often the starting point in work where aerodynamic drag must be calculated.

The US Navy Office of Naval Research gave Hoerner a contract in the mid-1960s to write a companion volume Fluid-Dynamic Lift. Co-authored with Henry V. "Hank" Borst, this book was published by Hoerner Fluid Dynamics in 1975. Unfortunately, Dr. Hoerner died before publication. This book, like its companion, contains documentation of the worldwide knowledge on the generation of aerodynamic lift and is still used heavily.

== Personal life ==
Hoerner was married to Liselotte A. Hoerner. After his death, she continued the mail order business, selling copies of both books to engineers around the world. Hoerner was married once before to Käte Sommer, the daughter of an academic family from Pölitz. However, this marriage lasted only from 1933 to 1941.
