= The Oldtimers =

Canadian documentary television series

- Genre: Documentary
- Country of origin: Canada
- Original language: English
- No. of seasons: 1
- No. of episodes: 8

Production
- Executive producer: Donnalu Wigmore
- Running time: 30 minutes

Original release
- Network: CBC Television
- Release: 11 November 1974 – 7 January 1975

The Oldtimers is a Canadian documentary television miniseries that aired on CBC Television from 1974 to 1975.

== Premise ==
This series profiled people who recounted their lives during the late 19th and early 20th century.

== Production ==
The series was a spin-off of a September 1973 special broadcast, The Time of My Life. Donnalu Wigmore tasked producers in various Canadian regions to prepare the various episodes.

The people profiled represented pioneers of regions from Newfoundland to British Columbia. One segment featured the experience of two First Nations women, one of whom was recorded on a treaty in 1877. Another broadcast concerned the Northwest Mounted Police while another concerned northern life.

== Scheduling ==
This half-hour series was broadcast on Mondays at 10:00 p.m. as follows:

- 11 November 1974 - The North West Mounted Police (debut)
- 18 November 1974
- 25 November 1974 - Canadian North
- 2 December 1974
- 9 December 1974 - The Women - Manitoba (10:30 p.m. due to earlier drama special)
- 16 December 1974
- 23 December 1974 - Oldtimers of Newfoundland
- 30 December 1974 - Oldtimers of Saskatchewan (finale)

Episodes were rebroadcast on Sundays at 2:00 p.m. from 13 April to 29 June 1975.
