= Lloyd Arabella =

Lloyd Arabella (1959–1961) Borgward Arabella (1961–1963)
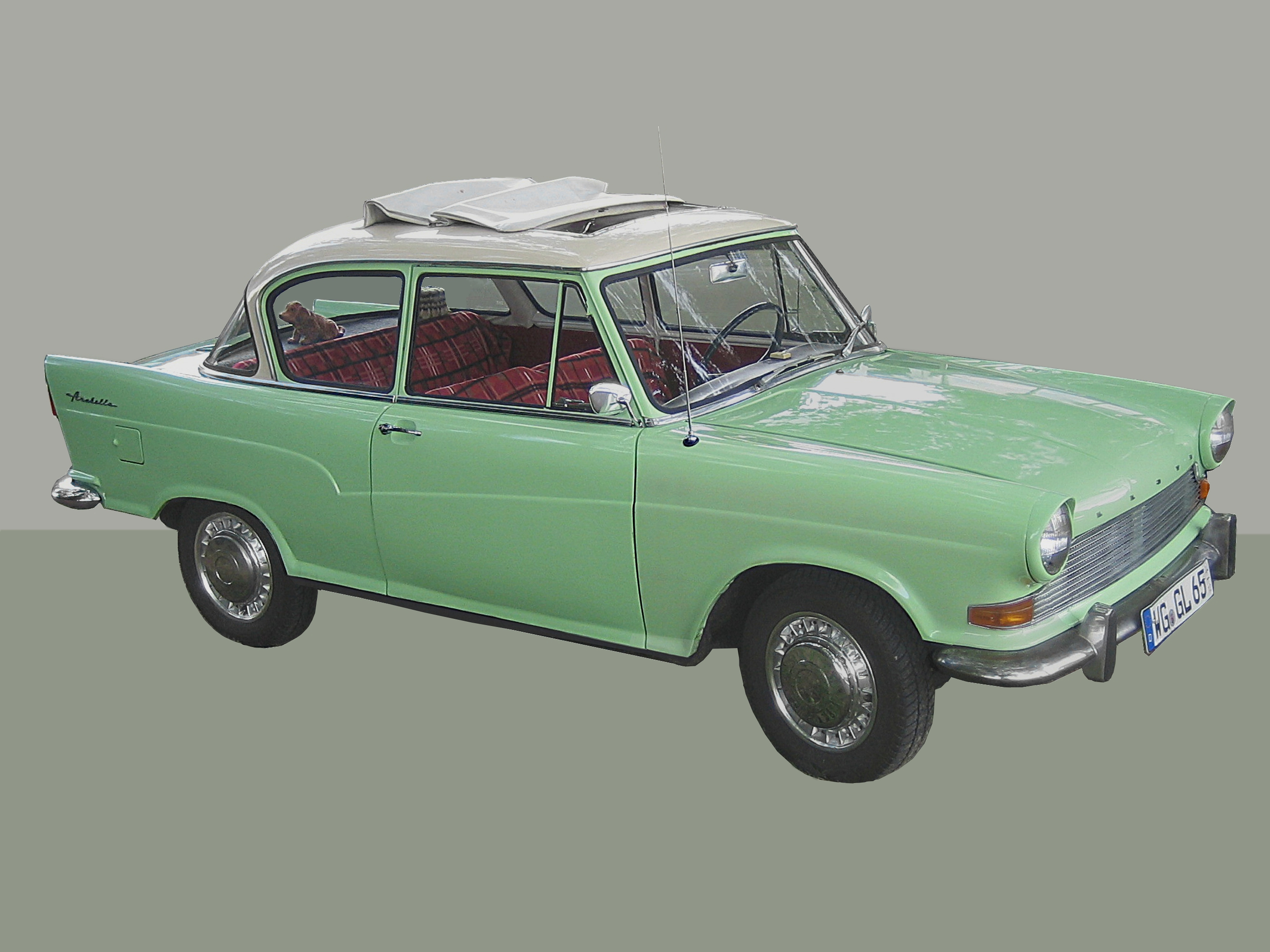
- Lloyd Arabella saloon

Overview
- Manufacturer: Carl F. W. Borgward GmbH
- Production: 1959–1961; 47,042 built
- Assembly: West Germany: Bremen

Body and chassis
- Body style: 2-door saloon 2-door Sport coupé (Frua)
- Layout: FF layout

Powertrain
- Engine: 897 cc Boxer 4-cylinder
- Transmission: 4-speed manual Saxomat semi-automatic optional

Dimensions
- Wheelbase: 2,200 mm (87 in)
- Length: 3,800 mm (150 in)
- Width: 1,510 mm (59 in)
- Height: 1,395 mm (54.9 in)
- Curb weight: 730 kg (1,610 lb) (empty); 1,075 kg (2,370 lb) (loaded)

The Lloyd Arabella was a passenger car produced by the Borgward Group in West Germany between 1959 and 1961. After the company's controversial bankruptcy the Arabella continued to be produced, albeit in greatly reduced quantities and branded as the Borgward Arabella until 1963. By the standards of the time and place it would have been defined as a small family car.

The Arabella was the first (and as matters turned out the last) car from Borgward's Lloyd division to be fitted with a four cylinder engine.

== Body and chassis ==
The Arabella was a completely new design, owing nothing to the Lloyd Alexander which it initially complemented and then replaced in the manufacturer's range. It was developed in just 23 months, which later commentators have asserted was much too short a period in which to identify and eliminate "teething-troubles" ahead of launch. It was constructed using a frame of tube-steel with cross-members.

The front wheels were suspended with double-wishbone connectors with coil springs and telescopic shock absorbers, and the back wheels on trailing arms with coil springs with and anti-roll bar. The brakes, considered advanced at the time, were applied using a hydraulic linkage, with four light-alloy 200 mm brake drums. The hand brake was operated mechanically and worked on the rear wheels. Almost as innovative at the time was the specification of tubeless tyres on the 13" wheels. The rack and pinion steering required 3.36 turns between opposite locks, and the turning circle was 10.7 m (35 ft).

The all-steel body followed modern styling trends, and featured a "panoramic wrap-around" rear window and tail fins. There was space for four people, although the two in the back would have found their head room rather restricted. The sales material of the time makes much of the car's passive safety features, such as the two spoke steering wheel with a recessed central hub, rounded door handles and a lock on the front seat-backs to prevent them from tilting forwards unexpectedly. The padded dashboard and interior window frames were also unusual, and the claim can certainly be made that in terms of secondary safety (US English: "crashworthiness") the Lloyd Arabella marked a step forward for cars of this class. The spare wheel was stowed below the rear luggage compartment. It was stowed externally which meant it could be accessed without having to empty out the luggage locker.

== Engine and transmission ==
It was originally planned to power the Arabella with an uprated version of the two cylinder four-stroke power unit used in the existing Lloyd Alexander, together with a suitably uprated gear box from the same car. However, testing of a chassis equipped with this combination indicated that would not all fit under the bonnet of the body, which by that stage had been finalised, so a four cylinder Boxer motor was hastily developed. The flat configuration of the boxer motor made it suitable for the low bonnet line of the bodywork, but accommodating it in the available space remained a challenge and the cooling fan had to be squeezed in above the two cylinders on the left side of the engine bay. Unlike the smaller existing Lloyd models, the Arabella used water to cool its engine. The gear box was positioned ahead of the front axle and ahead of the engine, as on the manufacturer's smaller cars, but it had to be redesigned in order to fit beyond the engine in the relatively short engine bay. There was talk of installing the engine transversely, possibly in order to avoid having to redesign the gearbox to make it fit, but in the event the Arabella featured a longitudinally mounted boxer motor.

== Broadening the range ==
=== Downmarket ===
On its introduction in August 1959, the Arabella featured a 4-cylinder 897 cc with a stated output of 38 PS (28 kW) at 4,800 rpm. During 1960 it was necessary to impose a major price increase, and in order to soften the blow a reduced specification cut-price Arabella was launched in July 1960, still with the 897 cc engine, but now in a detuned form offering a maximum power output of only 34 PS (25 kW) at 4,700 rpm.

=== Upmarket ===
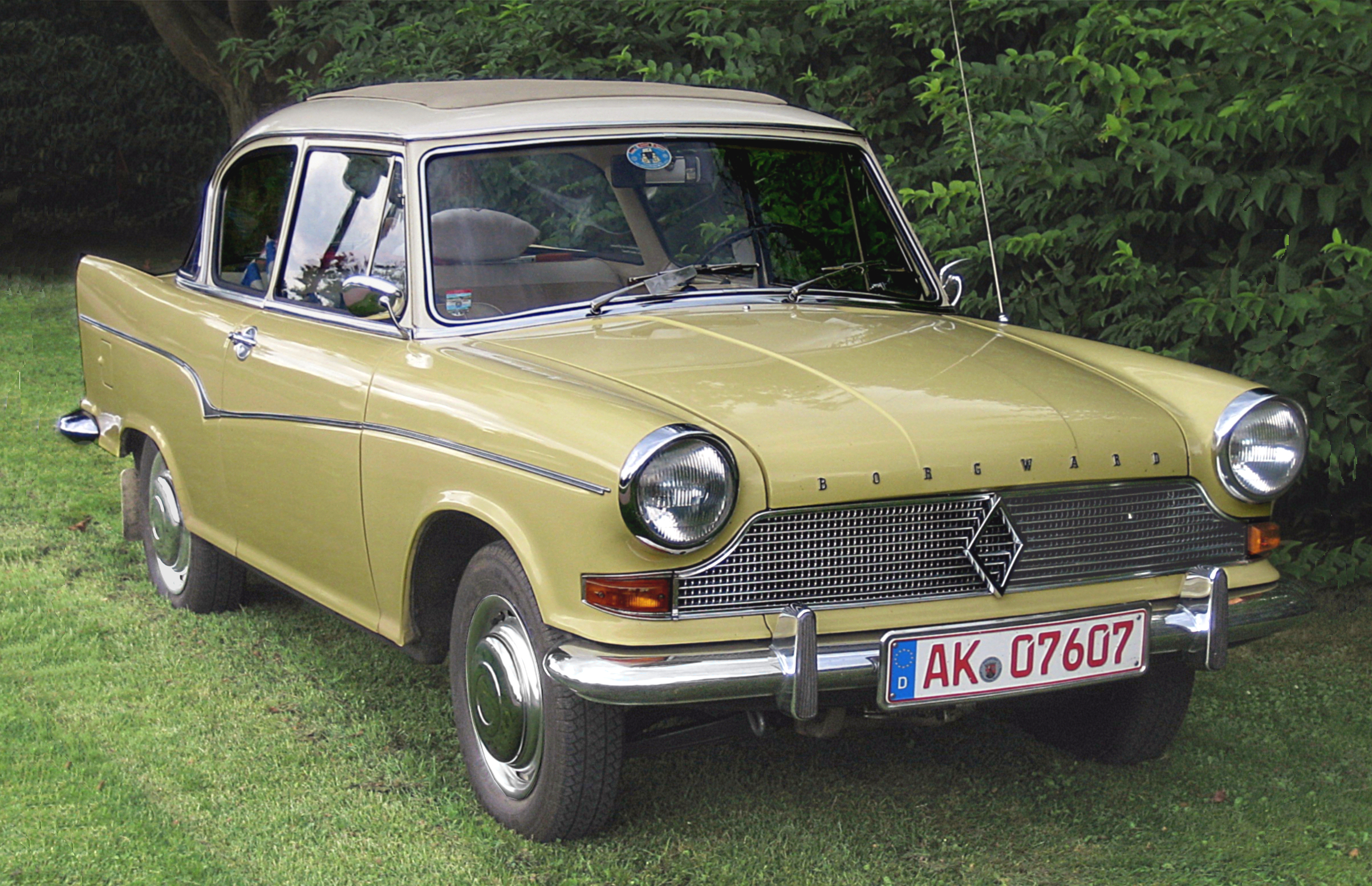
The Arabella de Luxe was differentiated by a revised radiator grille, featuring the traditional Borgward "rhombus" shape at its centre. The name "Borgward" was written on the front of the car in place of the name "Lloyd".

In October 1960, a de luxe version of the Arabella was added to the range. As far as the technical specifications were concerned, the Arabella de Luxe was differentiated from the standard model by its engine. It was still a 4-cylinder 897 cc unit, but maximum power was increased to 45 PS (33 kW) at 5,300 rpm. This was achieved by increasing the compression ratio from 1:7½ on the standard model to 1:9. That in turn meant that drivers had to pay a little more for their fuel, because the higher compression ratio necessitated the use of the "super" grade (high octane) petrol (gasoline) which was beginning to become available at West German service stations. The other important difference was the fitting of a larger Solex carburetor (34 PCI in place of the 28 mm carburetor used for the standard cars). The result was a useful improvement in performance, with the top speed increased from 120 km/h to 133 km/h (from 75 mph to 83 mph), while the standing start time to 100 km/h was reduced from 28 to 23 seconds. The Arabella de luxe was in these respects significantly brisker than more expensive (albeit larger and heavier) cars such as the Ford Taunus or, more importantly, the class-defining Volkswagen with its advertised top speed, in 1960, of only 112 km/h (70 mph) and leisurely standing start time to 100 km/h of 38 seconds.

From the outside the Arabella de Luxe was differentiated by a revised radiator grille, featuring the traditional Borgward "rhombus" shape at its centre, and the name "Borgward" was written on the front of the car in place of the name "Lloyd", even though sources state that the car was only formally rebranded as the "Borgward Arabella" in 1961. It is possible that the need to clear unsold stocks of new cars meant that any announcement of a rebranding was deferred so that the cars identified with the "Lloyd" name on the front could be sold (as new cars) first.

=== Arabella coupé ===
The Lloyd Sportcoupé is generally identified, in retrospect, as a coupé version of the Lloyd Arabella. In fact the Sportcoupé, with a body produced by Pietro Frua of Turin, made its debut at the Turin Motor Show in November 1958. At that stage it was powered by the 596 cc two stroke engine from the Lloyd Alexander TS, but the DM 6,000 asking price combined with the "rustic" sound and performance from the power unit made the car unsellable. However, by this time the manufacturer had given Frua firm orders for 50 of the coupé bodies, and so the little Sportcoupé reappeared at the Frankfurt Motor Show in September 1959, now as a coupé version of the Arabella. By the time the cars were actually disposed of they were powered by the 45 PS (33 kW) "high compression engine" version of the Arabella.

== Commercial ==
The Arabella was developed in just 23 months. There was a price to be paid for the rushed development schedule in terms of a large number of niggling faults and one or two more serious ones. The passenger cabin leaked on rainy days. The pattern of a pleasingly eye catching modern inherently robust new model from Borgward marred by "teething troubles" affecting the early cars was a familiar one for Borgward buyers through the 1950s, but by 1959 waiting lists were down and the West German car market had become far less forgiving. Early teething troubles caused massive damage to the image of the Lloyd Arabella, and large numbers of unsold Arabellas began to fill the undeveloped land beside the factory where the cars were assembled.

Lloyd Arabella: Output (units)

- 1959 ..... 5,428
- 1960 ... 32,887
- 1961 ..... 7,234
- 1962 ........ 600
- 1963 ........ 893

Considerable amounts of cash had been invested in the Arabella's development, including investment in a new assembly plant. Recovery of those costs from the sale of new cars necessitated a minimum level of sales, which the various technical niggles made unachievable in the market place. The car had been launched with a sticker price of DM 5,250. Less than a year later, in June 1960, the price was raised to DM 5,490, while the introduction of a cut-price reduced-performance version nevertheless enabled the manufacturer to advertise a "starting price" for the reduced-performance Arabella of DM 4,985. Meanwhile the West German small car market was increasingly dominated by Volkswagen. Volkswagen achieved sales volumes that more than covered necessary investment in upgrades for a car of which the basic architecture had not changed in more than ten years. The sticker price for a standard Volkswagen had been reduced in August 1955 to DM 3,790, where it stayed till September 1961 when it increased to DM 3,810. Pricing strategy for the Arabella was reversed in November 1960 with a price cut for the standard model to DM 5,230. This coincided with the introduction of the more powerful de Luxe version, however, which was priced at DM 5,730.

Information on sales volumes is unavailable, but production figures are known. Between 1959 and 1963 47,042 Arabellas were produced, of which nearly 70% were produced during 1960. Following the company's bankruptcy in 1961, the Arabella was the only model that continued in production for another couple of years, with the plant now rented from its new owner, and 893 Arabellas produced in 1963 by a group of former employees who had acquired the necessary rights during the liquidation process. Nevertheless, the size of the investment in developing and preparing to produce the Arabella, couple with the failure to sell it in sufficient quantities to recover the investment within a reasonable period, were a major contributor to the company's bankruptcy in 1961.

Meanwhile, following the appearance of two show cars at the September 1959 motor show, the fifty Frua Sportcoupé bodies were mated with to the underpinnings of the Arabella and offered for sale, now at a price of DM 7,500. Despite the improved performance characteristics available from the larger engine, there was no market for a miniature Sportcoupé Arabella in Germany, and while the two cars that had appeared at Frankfurt turned up again at several subsequent European motor shows, the rest of the cars were eventually earmarked for export. Most of them ended up on the USA where they were used to grab attention in show rooms, and some of them found buyers as stylish second cars for the wives and daughters of one or two affluent buyers.
