= Helmut Krackowizer =

Austrian motorcycle racer

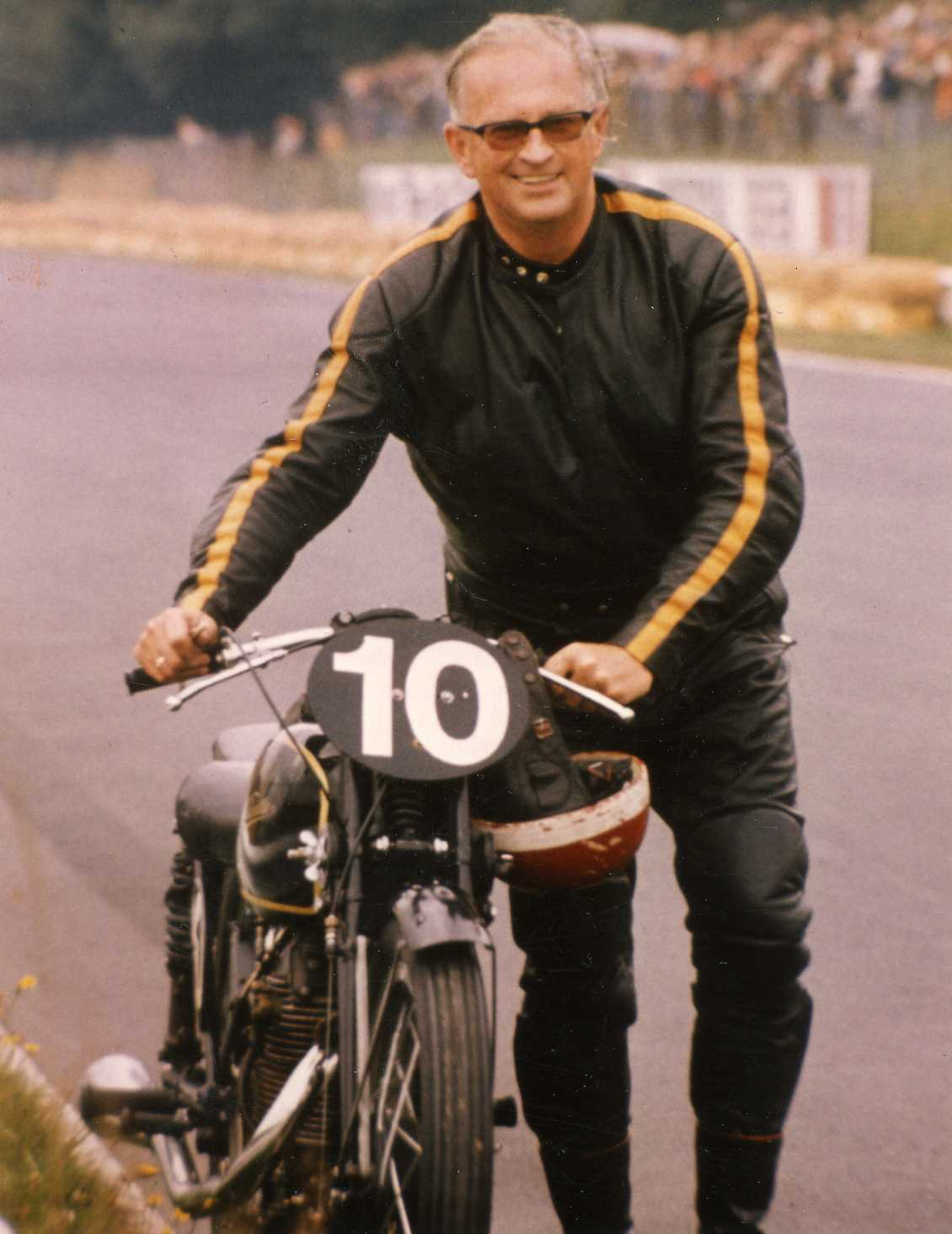
- Krackowizer in 1980
- Born: 29 April 1922; Austria
- Died: 22 October 2001 (aged 79)
- Children: Peter Krackowizer (son)

Helmut Krackowizer (29 April 1922 – 22 October 2001) was an Austrian motorcycle racer and journalist known for his work with vintage motorcycles.

== Early life ==
Born in Austria on 29 April 1922, Krackowizer began drawing motorcycles as a young schoolboy. He rode his first motorcycle, a 250cc NSU, at the age of 16, and soon replaced this motorcycle with a 500cc Norton "International".

In 1932, Krackowizer attended one of the first races on the Gaisberg near Salzburg. He took advantage of any opportunities to ride, buy (a Rudge 250cc two-valve, his first racing motorcycle after the Second World War), or rescue motorcycles. He saw the end of the war as a fighter controller of the Air Signal Corps in a night interception troop – on a motorcycle – in Norway.

== Business Ventures ==
After Krackowizer retired from active racing in 1955, he began to track down historic motorcycles from around Europe. He kept some of these finds and had them restored, others were exchanged or sold on. In 1967, he founded the third Motor Veterans Club in Austria, the Motor Veterans Club Salzburg. In 1976, Krackowizer also became president of the Austrian Motor Veterans Association for a short time.

In 1974, Krackowizer organized the "Oldtimer Grand Prix" at the Salzburgring, an event that continued until 1987 and featured vintage motorcycles and automobiles, attracting over 100 automobiles and up to 300 motorcycles. Attendees included the Mercedes-Benz famous Silver Arrows, BMW, and Audi who brought historical racing cars from their museums to Salzburg.

Krackowizer's attempts to establish a Motor Veteran Museum in Salzburg were unsuccessful. Thus, some collections of vintage motorcycles and automobiles whose owners Krackowizer had already won over for the project (such as Walter Brandstetter from St. Pölten) went to other domestic and foreign motor museums.

== Career ==
=== Motorcycle racing ===
In the autumn of 1946, Krackowizer rode his first motorcycle race with his Rudge 250cc in heavy rain at the first post-war race in Salzburg-Nonntal, Austria. He came in third.

Then, in the spring of 1947, the first dirt track race in Salzburg, organized by the just-founded SAMTC (Salzburg Automobile, Motorcycle, and Touring Club), attracted 20,000 spectators on the trotting racecourse in Salzburg-Aigen. The SAMTC's first motorcycle race took place on the motorway in Salzburg-Liefering on 6 July 1947. In 1958, this race became the Grand Prix of Austria for motorcycles, which moved later on the motorway Anif - Grödig, also near Salzburg, and at the end on the Salzburgring, where the race had been upgraded in 1970 to a world champion race.

In that motorcycle race on 6 July 1947, Krackowizer won the junior class 250cc on Rudge in 44:32:8 minutes, followed by the Salzburgians Fritz Walcher on New Imperial with a time of 46:43:4 minutes and Richard Kwitt on Puch in 46:43:4 minutes. The race was 15 laps, which corresponded to a distance of 63 kilometers (39 mi). Krackowizer also competed in the senior race and led for three laps before he had to abandon due to a mechanical issue. This was the beginning of a motorcycle racing career that was to last until 1955.

The year 1947 became one of the most successful racing years for Krackowizer. Among the Austrian races he took part in were Rankweil and Lustenau (Vorarlberg), the Innsbruck - Hungerburg hill climb race, in Graz-Lazarett Siedlung and Ries hill climb race, Pötschen Pass as well as in Liechtenstein at the Triesenberg. His 1947 results were: three first places, two class records, two second places, and two fourth places.

In 1948, Krackowizer intended to take part in the Isle of Man TT but failed to do so because of missing border documents at the Swiss border. In the following years, he also rode overseas with some success e.g. in Olten and Erlen, at the "Schauinsland" hill climb race, in Ingolstadt and the Norisring in Nuremberg as well as at the Hockenheimring.

Over the years, Krackowizer rode several motorcycle marques: Rudge 250cc, Velocette KTT MK VIII 350cc ex Binder, BSA Gold Star 350cc Lohner scooter, Norton 500cc AJS, Puch, and others. In 1955, he retired from his active motorcycle racing career.

=== Journalism ===
After graduating from the University of Economics in Vienna, Krackowizer began work in 1952 at the factory Eternit in Vöcklabruck, Upper Austria. He moved to Salzburg in 1955 to start his career as a public relations and advertising manager at Porsche Austria. Later, he moved to Mercedes-Benz (1964) and British Leyland (1969). His last job until his retirement in 1987 was with Chrysler (renamed Talbot and finally merged with Peugeot).

During this period, Krackowizer contributed articles on motorcycle racing to German- and English-language magazines and returned to his childhood interest in drawing motorcycles. His drawings were first published in 1965. Having written and published books on motorcycles, including Motorcycle Sport and The History of Famous Makes of Motorcycle, he returned to his drawings, particularly pencil drawings showing fine details of a motorcycle. He continued this hobby until the last months of his life.

=== Death ===
On the morning of 22 October 2001, Krackowizer died at the age of 79, after suffering his third heart attack on Monday, 15 October.

== Publications ==
- TOEFF Land Schweiz, SERAG AG Verlag, Pfäffikon, 1992, OCLC 75338378
- Motorrad Album, Markt Buch, VF Verlagsgesellschaft Wiesbaden, 1990, ISBN 3-926917-05-9
- Motorräder – Berühmte Marken von Adler bis Zenith, Markt Buch VF Verlagsgesellschaft Wiesbaden 1988, ISBN 3-926917-00-8
- Motorräder – Berühmte Marken von AJS bis Zündapp, Welsermühl Verlag
- 25 Motorrad WM, 1975, Welsermühl Verlag
- Meilensteine der Motorradgeschichte von 1885 bis heute, Motorbuch Verlag, Stuttgart
- Meilensteine der Motorradgeschichte, 1995, Gondrom Verlag GmbH
- Horex Regina bis Imperator 1950–56, Motorbuch Verlag, Stuttgart, 1986
- Österreichische Kraftfahrzeuge. Von Anbeginn bis heute, 1982
- Die klassischen Rennmotorräder, Motorbuch Verlag, Stuttgart, 1965

== Sources ==
- "The Classic Motor Cycle" August/September 1982: "Happy birthday Helmut", Vic Willoughby
- "KURIER Motor" Vienna, April 30, 1982: "Die ungenießbaren Tellernocken"
- "AMC" 6/1984: "Leuchtender Stern" (BSA "Gold Star")
- "Classic Bike" April 1989: "The Rudge that Brumm built", by Helmut Krackowizer
- "Markt" 7/1990: "Eine Runde für Wal! Mit Walter Handleys 1930er Rudge fuhr Dr. Krackowizer noch einmal über die TT-Strecke auf der Isle of Man"
- "Austro Classic", 3/1997: "Happy birthday, Professor Dr. Helmut Krackowizer 'Rudge 1' "
- "Motorrad Classic" 3/1997: "Der Motorrad Professor"
- "Moto Sport Schweiz" 19/1997 and 18/1981
- "Salzburger Nachrichten" April 26, 1997 "British only mit Krackowizer"
- "VFV Info 2/1997": "Motorrad-Professor Dr. Krackowizer"
