= Cyklon =

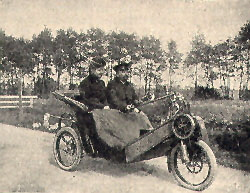
- German couple riding a Cyklonette

Overview
- Production: 1902-1931

Cyklon was a German make of car produced from 1902 to 1931. It was primarily noted for its unique three-wheeled design.

== Three-wheelers ==
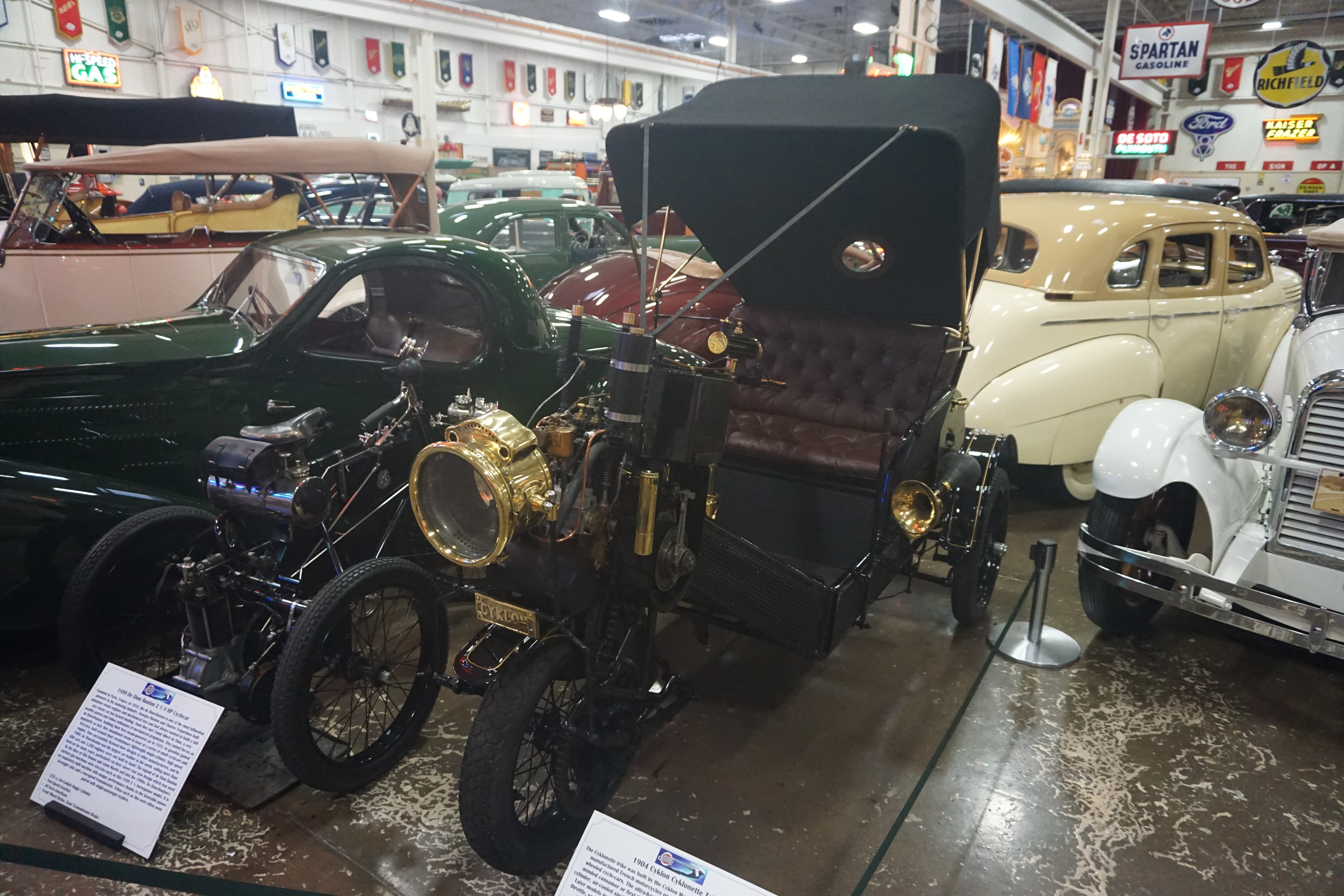
1904 Cyklon Cyklonette at Stahls Automotive Collection

The three-wheeled Cyklon Cyklonette was made for 1902. It was a three-wheeler with a single wheel in the front to steer, and to provide propulsion from a 450 cc one-cylinder engine mounted directly above it. This made the Cyklonette one of the earliest front-wheel drive cars. Power was 3.5 bhp (2.6 kW) in the first models. Later models were equipped with a 1.3 L two-cylinder engine producing 6 bhp (4.5 kW), though some had a straight-four. The Cyklonette was available until 1923, well after three-wheelers had vanished from the mainstream.

== Four-wheelers ==
The Cyklon Schebera was available for 1920 and sported a 1.2 L straight-four and was front-engined with rear-wheel drive. The updated Cyklon 9/40 was released in 1926, with a six-cylinder engine displacing 2.3 L. All Cyklon models were hit hard by the Great Depression. Sales were sluggish in the final years, and the company went out of business in 1931.

== See also ==
- Cyklonetka
