= D-Rad =

Former German motorcycle factory

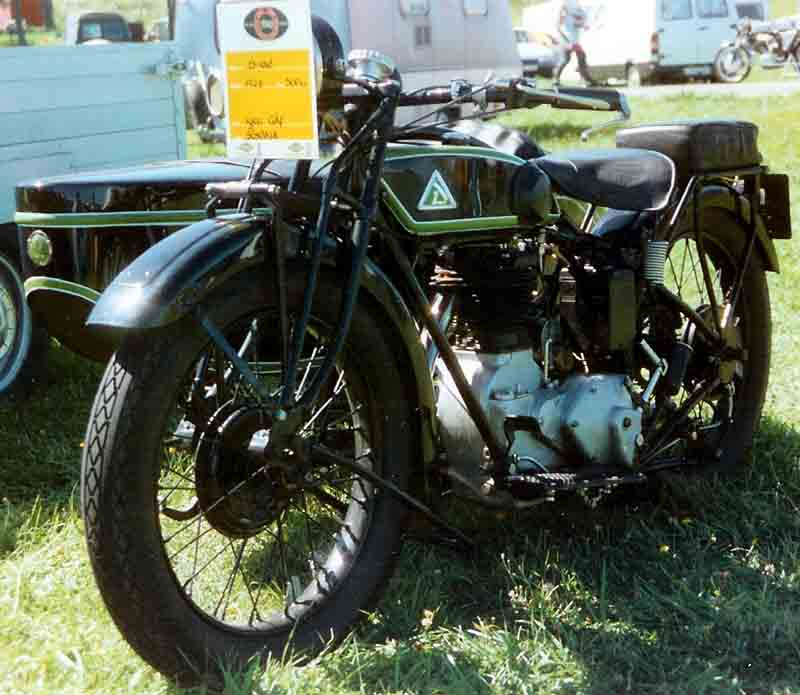
D-Rad R0/6 - 1928

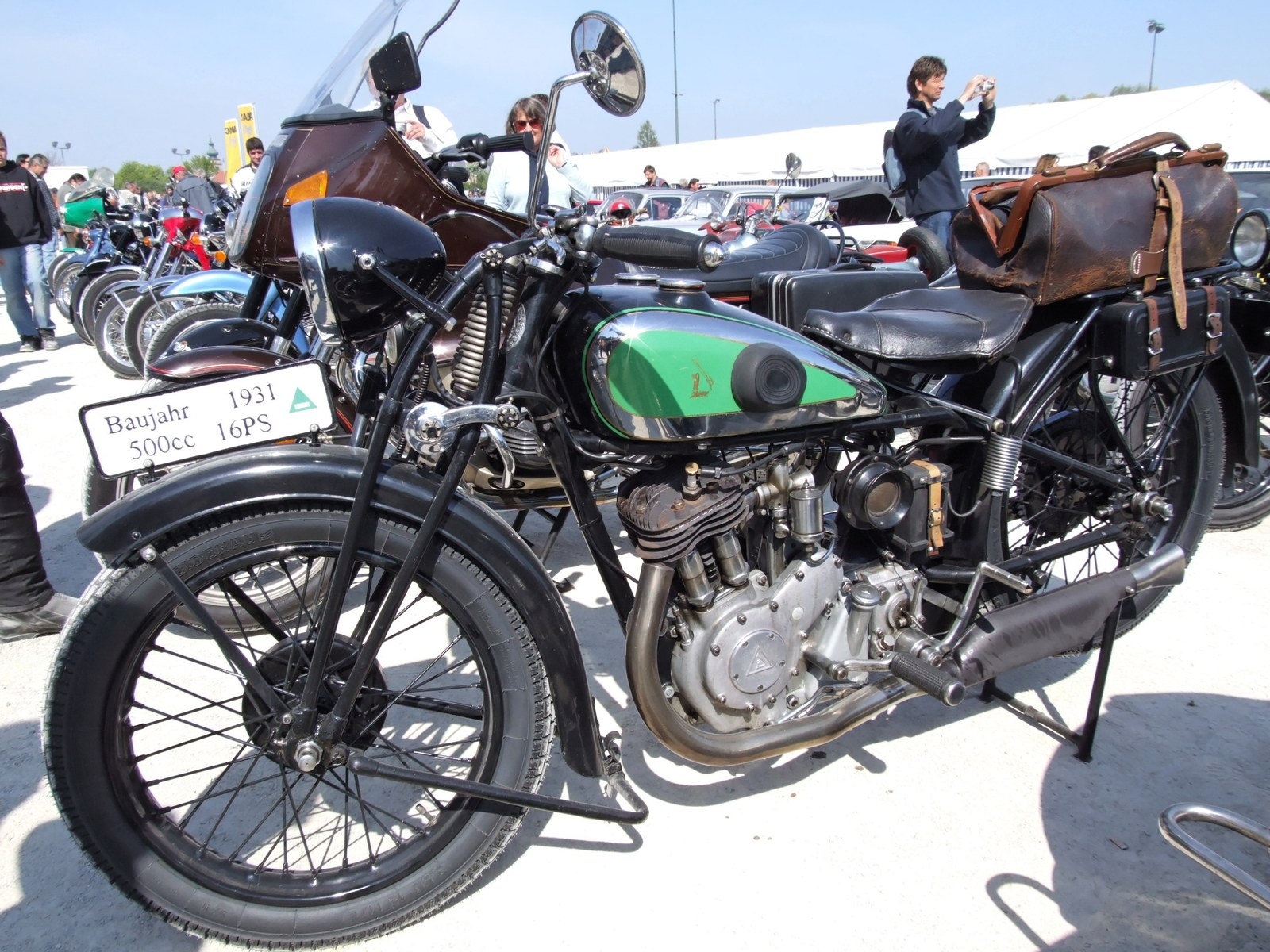
D-Rad R11 - 1931

D-Rad, short for Deutsches Motorrad, was a motorcycle factory in Berlin (Spandau), Germany. The brand was founded in 1896 as a daughter company of Deutsche Industriewerke AG. From 1920 it produced motorcycles under the brands Star and Derad. In 1923 Deutsche Industrie-Werke took it over and changed the name to D-Rad. NSU merged with Deutsche Industrie-Werke in 1932 and terminated D-Rad production in 1933.
