= Tempo (car brand) =

Automobile manufacturer in Germany

Vidal & Sohn Tempo-Werke GmbH
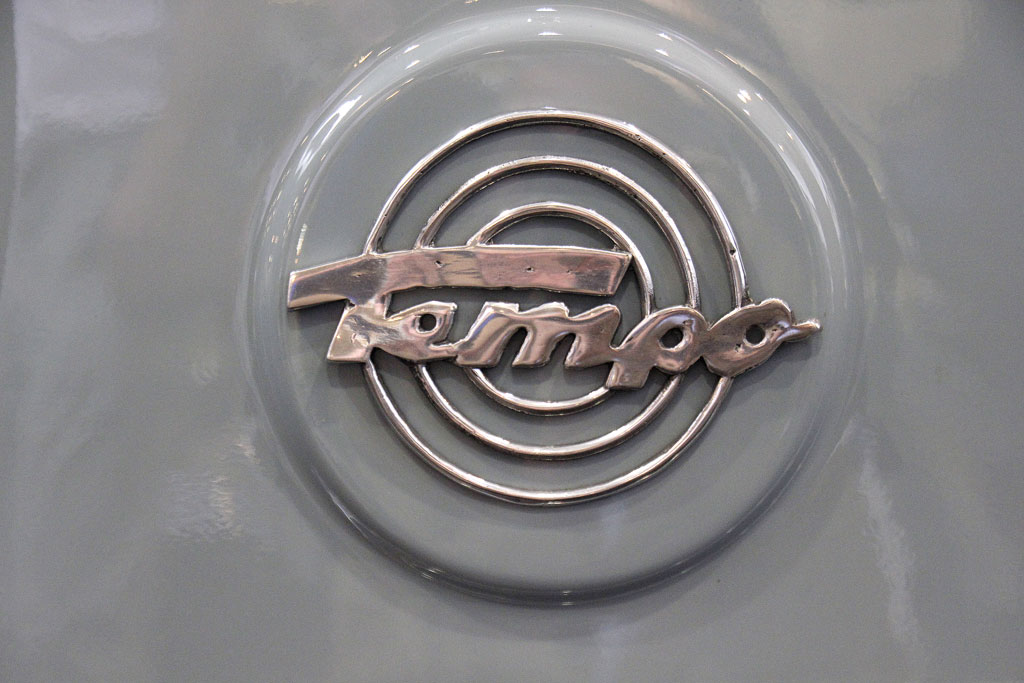
- Type: Public
- Industry: Automobiles
- Founded: 1924
- Defunct: 1977
- Fate: production ceased
- Headquarters: Hamburg
- Products: LCV (1949–1966) off-road cars (1935–1958) military vehicles (1940s) cars (1934–1957)
- Parent: Hanomag (1965–1970); Daimler-Benz (1971–1977)

Tempo (also known as Vidal & Sohn Tempo-Werke GmbH), was a German automobile manufacturer based in Hamburg. The company was founded by Oscar Vidal in 1924.

The company was well known in Germany, producing popular vans like the Tempo Matador and the Tempo Hanseat. Tempo also produced small military vehicles during the 1930s and 1940s.

== History ==
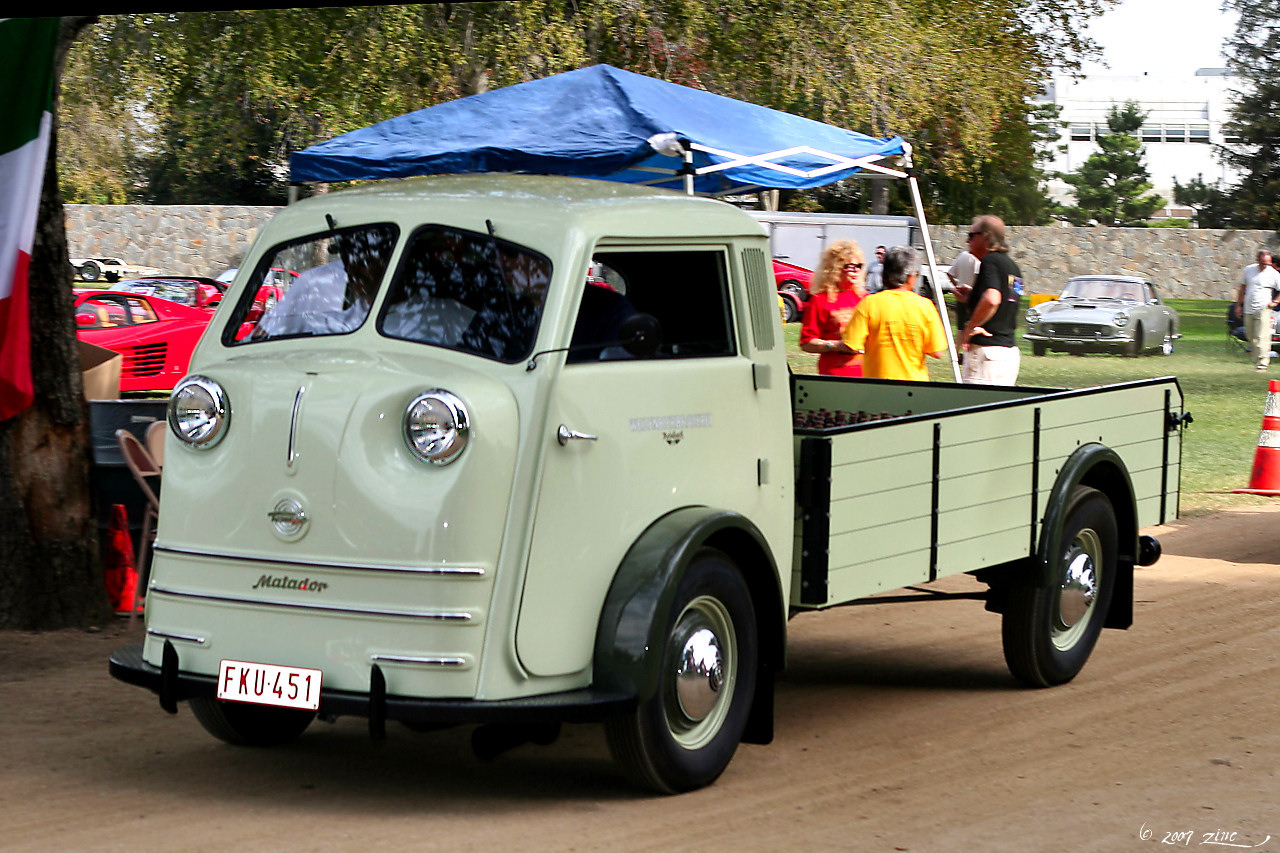
Tempo Matador (Restored)

Tempo was founded as Vidal & Sohn Tempo-Werke in 1924. During the 1940s, Tempo produced small military vehicles. Post-war the requirement of the Bundesgrenzschutz, in West Germany, to acquire a suitable vehicle for Border patrol led to production of the 80" and 86" Tempo from 1953 to 1957. The Tempo 80" and 86" were built using a rolling chassis from Land Rover, but attempts to continue production with the 88" and 109" models were not successful.

In 1958, Firodia Ltd, an Indian manufacturer of cars (later acquired by Bajaj Tempo, renamed since 2005 to Force Motors), started the production of Hanseat three-wheeled cars with the collaboration of Tempo-Werke. Later on, Tempo introduced the Matador, which (along with the Hanseat) was extremely popular in India where it was used as goods carrying vehicles. The four-wheeled Matador remained under production by Tempo from 1949 until 1967.

In 1966, Tempo partnered with Hanomag AG, the produced vehicles were sold under the name of Hanomag. From 1967 to 1970 the vehicles were sold under the new name "Hanomag-Henschel". In 1971, Hanomag-Henschel, and within Tempo, was purchased by Daimler-Benz AG. Tempo remained on the production of vans until 1977. From 1966 to 1977, all vehicles produced by Tempo were sold under a different name, either Hanomag, Rheinstahl-Hanomag, Hanomag-Henschel, or Mercedes-Benz.

== Vehicles by Tempo ==
=== The first tricycles ===
The first tempo tricycles were created from a combination of motorcycle and flatbed, which was in front of the driver. In the further development, the cab was moved in front of the bunk or box. The tempo tricycles are equipped with single-cylinder or two-cylinder two-stroke Otto engines—the 400cc 12 hp Tempo A in 1938, for example. The engine drives the front wheel through a transmission and a chain. The engine, the transmission, the load-bearing chain box, and the front wheel are hinge-connected to the rest of the vehicle as an integrated pivotable part.

=== Off-road vehicle ===
The cross-country car Tempo G 1200 was produced from 1936 to 1944. In 1936, Otto Daus developed this off-road vehicle for Tempo with two engines (one in front and one in the back) and four-wheel drive. The two-stroke engines each had 19 hp and drove each one axle.

=== Matador, Wiking and Rapid ===
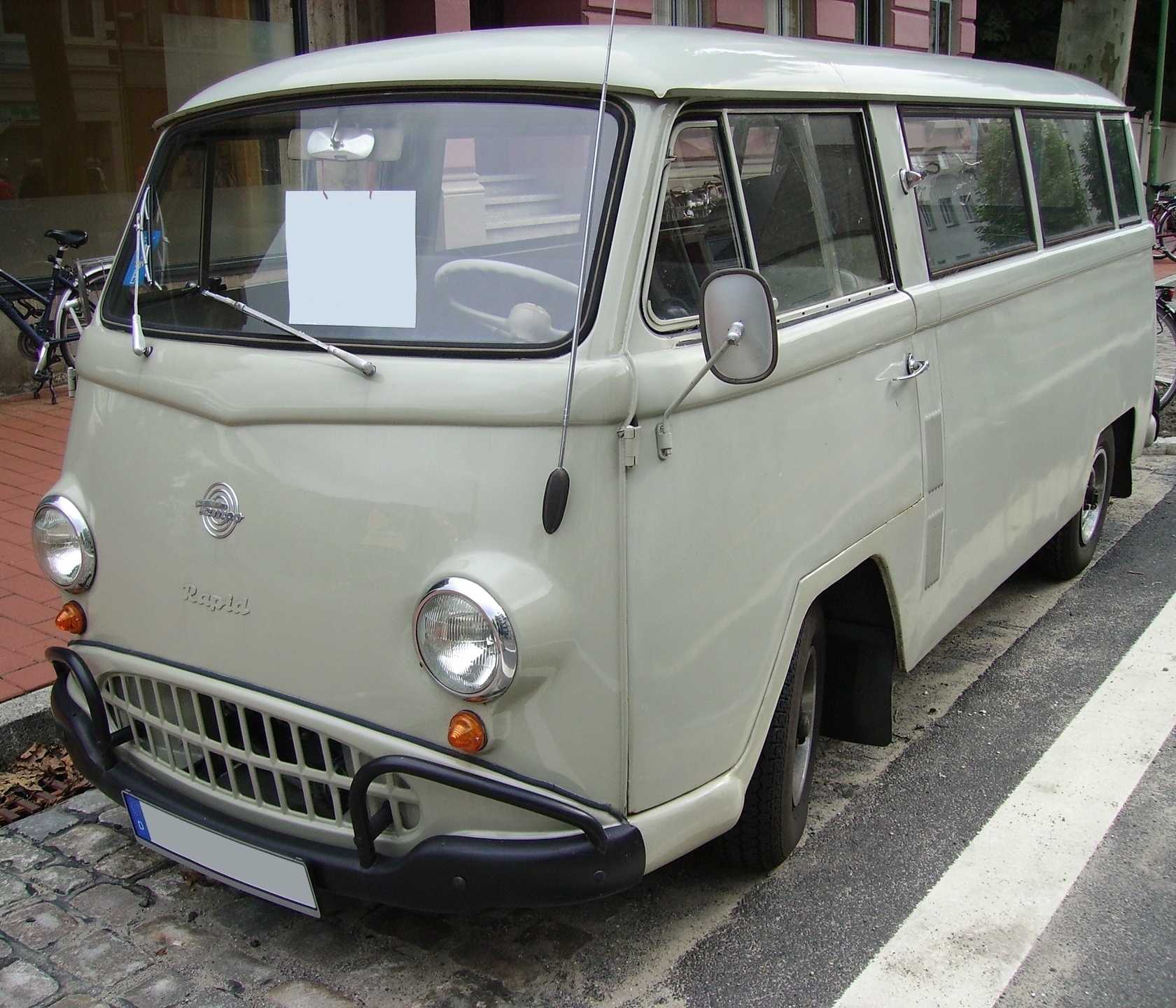
Tempo Rapid Minibus

Parallel to the Hanseat the four-wheel delivery vans Matador and Wiking were added to the Tempo lineup. At about the same time Volkswagen started offering the 0.75-ton VW T1, a direct competitor of Matador. The first Matador from 1949 (whose front-end has been compared to a boxer's face) was powered by a 25-horsepower VW industrial engine sourced directly from Volkswagen. As Tempo failed to secure a long-term supply contract with the managing director Heinz Nordhoff, Volkswagen stopped the delivery of this engine at short notice in 1952. Thereafter, the Matador was fitted with either a two-stroke-engine of 672 cc or a four-stroke-engine (1092 cc, 34 hp), both of which came from the engineering office of Müller in Andernach.

In 1953, the Wiking entered the market, a 3/4 ton (up to 850 kg payload) truck with a 17 PS (13 kW) 452 cc two-stroke Heinkel engine. The Wiking was built until 1955.

The Wiking-based Rapid was a minibus which was built from 1957 to 1963. It was powered by a 948 cc and 34 PS (25 kW) engine supplied by the Austin Motor Company.

== Licensed production by other companies ==
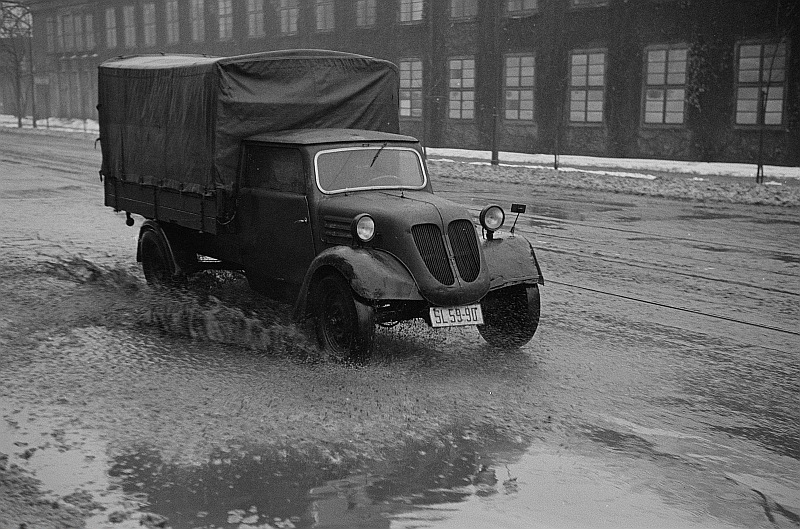
Tempo A600, a later version of their first four-wheeled vehicle

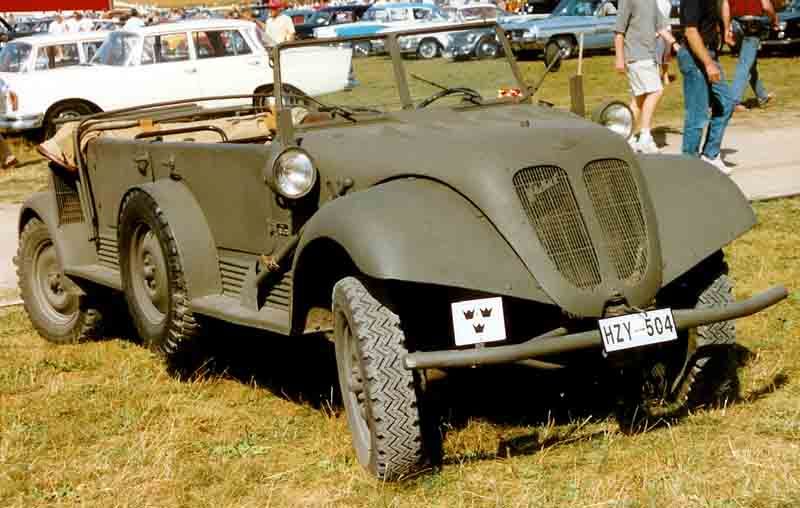
1939 Tempo G 1200

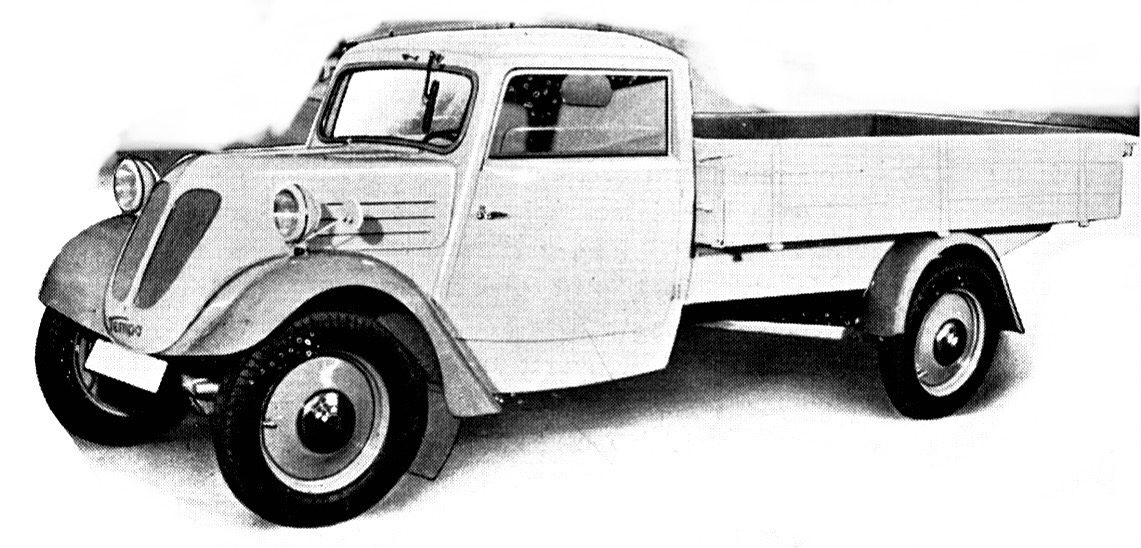
Tempo E 600

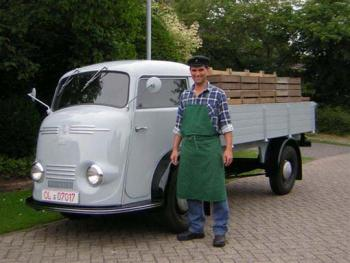
1950 Tempo Matador

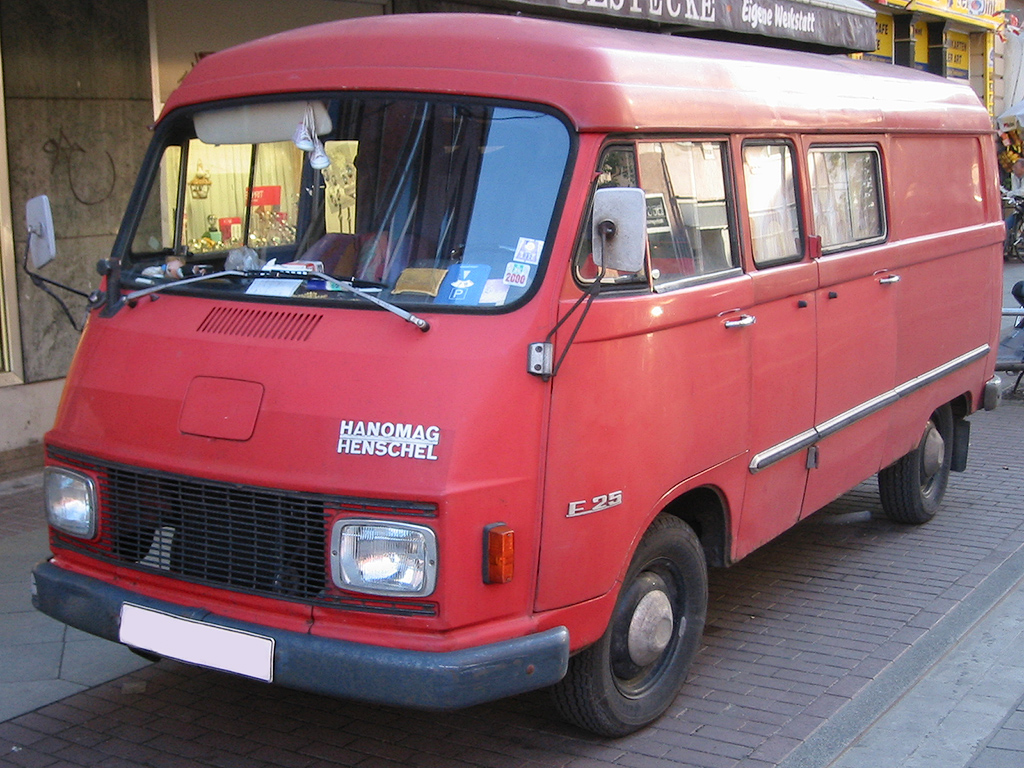
Hanomag-Henschel F 20

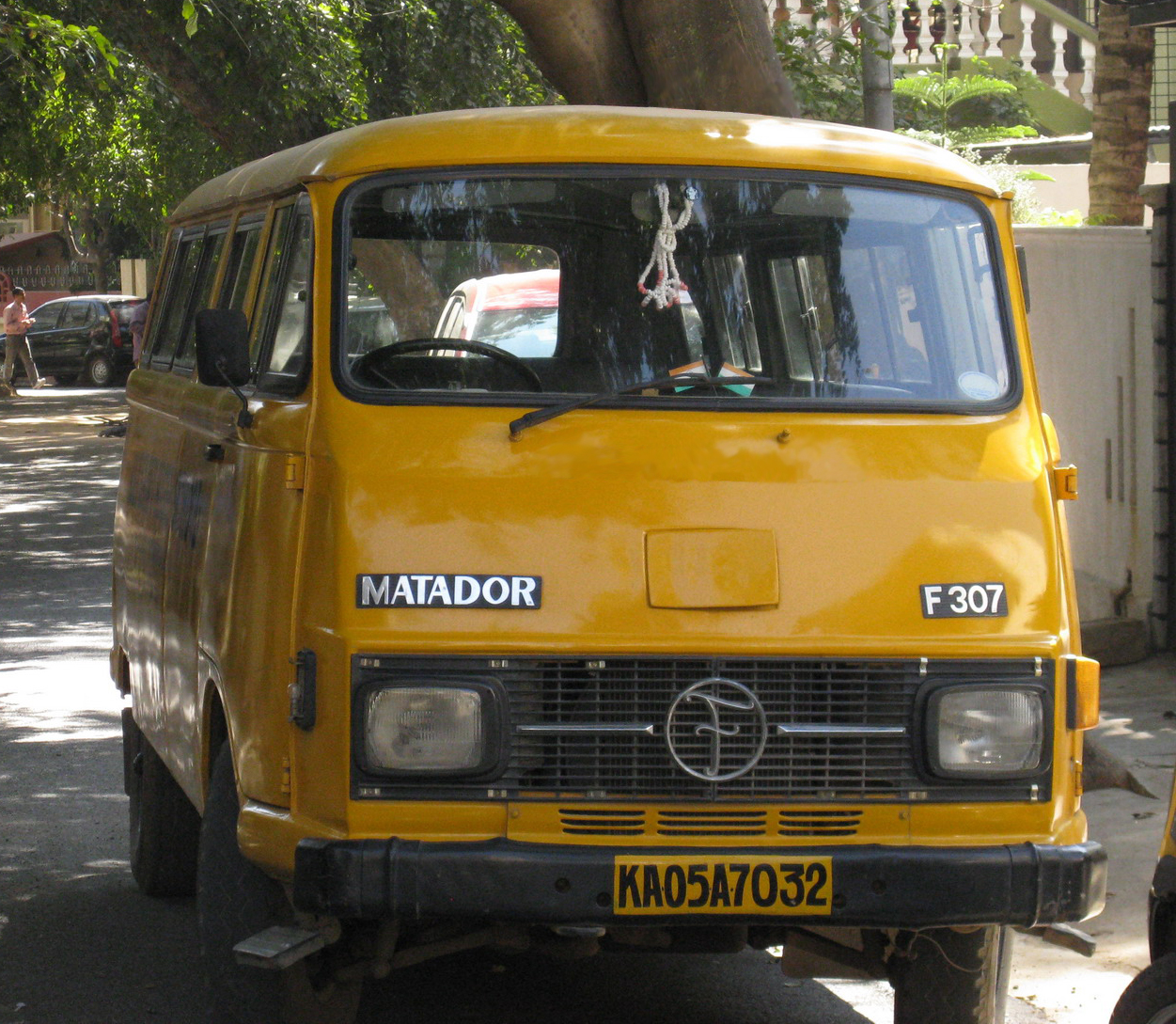
Tempo Matador F307 built by Force Motors, then Bajaj Tempo was in production until 2000

- Spain: Tempo Onieva, later taken over by Barreiros, made Tempo Viking vans and light trucks featuring Barreiros diesel engines.
- Uruguay: Tempo Viking and Matador were made by Germania Motors.
- United Kingdom: Jensen Motors made the Tempo Matador too, known as Tempo 1500 or Jensen Front Wheel Drive, starting in 1958.
- India: The Tempo Hanseat remained under production by Bajaj Tempo under the name Bajaj Tempo Hanseat from 1962 to 2000 ("Force" in latter years).
- Australia: The 1963–1965 Jolus Minx F1 car used suspension and cut down drive shafts from the Matador.

Goliath motors ltd in Bremen (Part of the Borgward-group) also produced a three-wheeler until 1961, but this was not a version of the Hanseat.

== Models ==
- Tempo, light commercial vehicles (LCV):
  - T 1, T2 (1928–1930)
  - T 6 (1929–1935)
  - T 10 (1930–1936)
  - Pony (1932–1936)
  - Front 6 (1933–1934)
  - Front 7, 10, 14 (1934–1935)
  - Front 9, 12 (1933–1935)
  - D 200, D 400 (1935–1936)
  - V 600 (1935–1936)
  - E 200, E 400, E 600 (1936–1937)
  - A 200 Resolut (1938–1940)
  - A 600 Titan (1938–1943)
  - A 400 Athlet (1938–1948)
  - Hanseat (1949–1956)
  - Boy (1950–1956)
  - Matador / Mayor (1949–1952); 13521 of these vehicles were built using a 25 hp Volkswagen 1100 cc motor and ZF gearbox. The incoming Typ 2 Volkswagen led Wolfsburg to cease supply of the engine, ending the model run and forcing Tempo to return to two-stroke engines.
  - Matador 1000, 1400 / Mayor 1000, 1400 (1952–1955)
  - Wiking / Viking (1953–1955)
  - Wiking 1 / Viking 1 (1955–1963)
  - Matador 1 / Mayor 1 Jensen Tempo 1500 (1955–1963)
  - Rapid (1957–1963)
  - Matador E / Mayor E (1963–1966)
- Tempo off-road cars:
  - T 1200 (1935)
  - G 1200 (1936–1943)
  - Tempo Land Rover (1953–1958)
  - Daus 214 (1958)
- Tempo cars:
  - 2/3 Sitzer front 6-14 (1934–1935)
  - Kombinationswagen (400, 600) (1935–1940)
  - Kleinwagen A (1955)
  - Kleinwagen B (1956)
  - Kleinwagen Y (1957)
- Hanomag production:
  - Athlet, Matador / Mayor (1966–1967)
  - F20 - 36 (1967–1970/75); built in India as the Tempo Matador
- Daimler-Benz production:
  - L 206 / 307 (1971–1977)

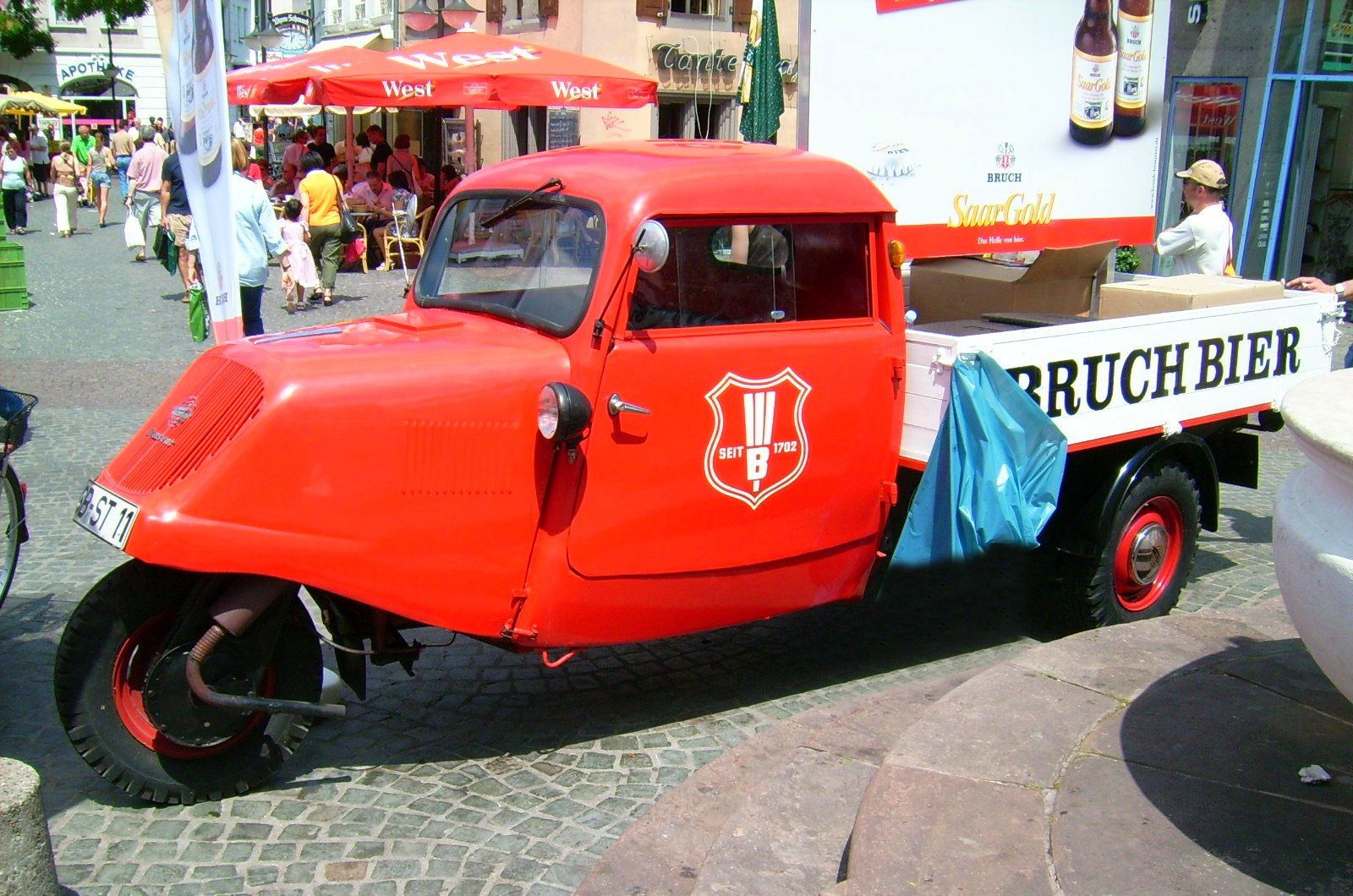
Tempo Hanseat Flatbed

== See also ==
- DKW Schnellaster
- Hanomag
- Mercedes-Benz
- Force Motors, formerly Bajaj Tempo, produced Hanomag products in India.
