= Rollfix-Eilwagen =

Rollfix-Eilwagen GmbH

The Rollfix-Eilwagen GmbH (Rollfix Express Car Ltd.) was a German manufacturer of motor vehicles in Wandsbek quarter of Hamburg, Germany, located at Stubbenhuk 10, today the location of the Henry-Nannen Journalist School.

The company was founded in 1923 or earlier. Another source indicates 1926 as founding year. 1923 began the production and marketing of three wheeler of the brand Rollfix. The company was specialized on commercial vehicles. In addition, some were created Passenger cars.

1933 it came to a comparison procedure. Successor company became the 1934 Rollfix-Werke Frederic Schröder KG with the brand name Motrix.

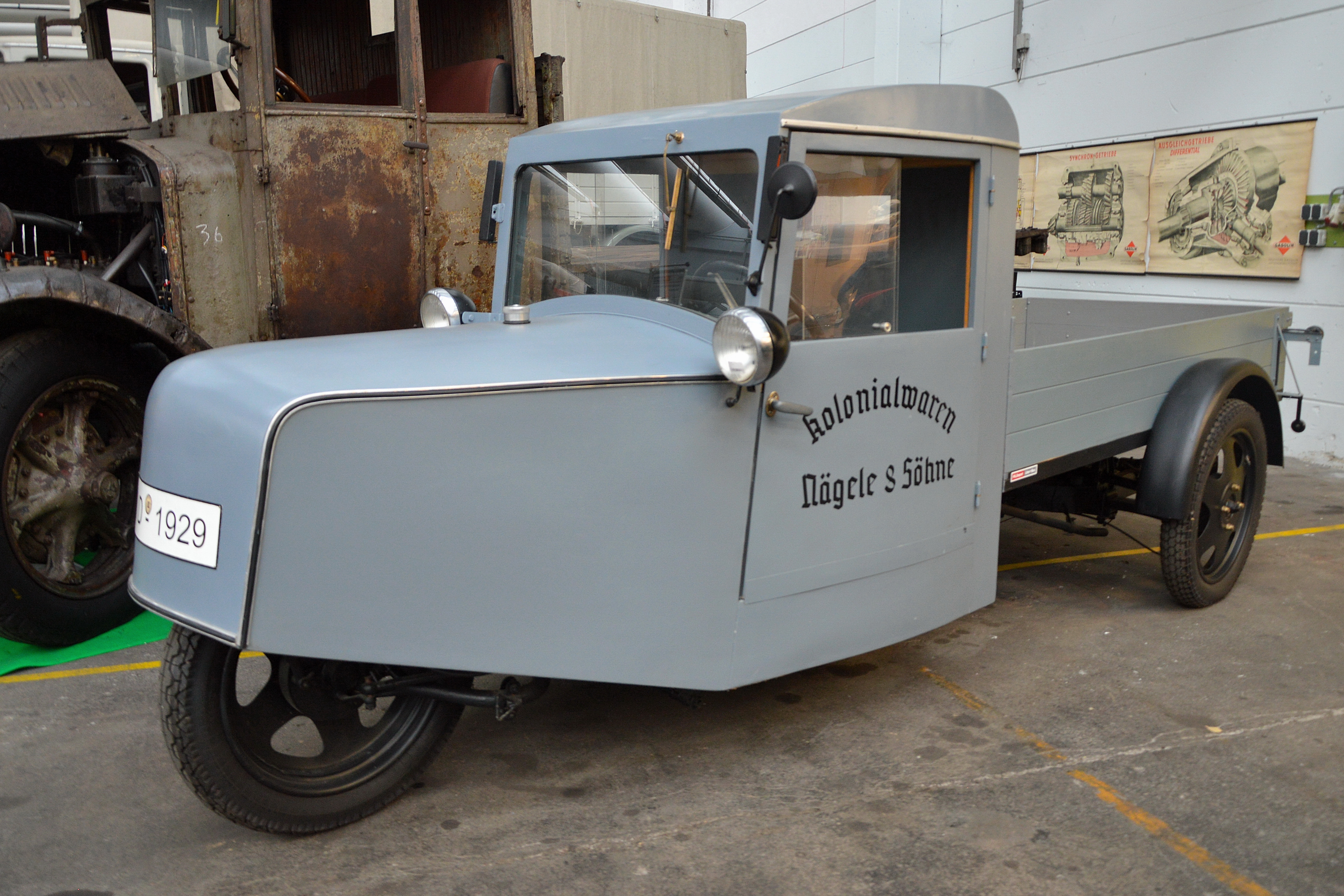
5 HP Rollfix Hamburg, two-stroke engined

The first vehicles had the single wheel behind. Between the two front wheels was an open platform for cargo. Alternatively, a box was available. A tubular frame formed the base. A two-stroke engine was placed in front of the chaindriven rear wheel. First 127 cc engines were supplied by DKW and had optional 297 cc. The driver sat on a saddle over the rear wheel. An advertisement shows a two seats in row version. It was steered with a handlebar. The original price was 1000 Reichsmark.

In 1927 a steering wheel superseded the handlebar. The engines supplier changed to the ILO-Motorenwerke, Pinneberg. Prices rose from 1260 to 1600 Reichsmark.

In 1932 or 1933, a redesign was marketed. The single wheel was now in front. The model Hamburg was a flatbed truck with closed cab. It was designed for 500 kg payload. The ILO engine was 200 cc. On the same frame a rig for 1.5 tons payload was designed. The new price was 2580 Reichsmark was described as too high for successful marketing.

Also two passenger car variants were offered in 1933, although unclear if ever produced. One is called tail-heavy sedan with four seats and the other as Station wagon "Kombinationskraftwagen" with folding top.

In the same year the Rollfix record appeared on the market. It was a two-seater with a single rear wheel. The roof was open, but not the back wall or rear window. The engine was mounted in the rear. He drove over a three-speed gearbox with reverse gear and a chain on the rear wheel. A 200 cc single-cylinder engine with 5.5 HP and another 300 cc single-cylinder engine with 7.5 HP as well as a 400 cc two-cylinder engine with 11 HP were offered. The 323 cm long vehicle had a 234 cm wheelbase and a 136 cm gauge. One sample still exists.
