= Goliath (company) =

German car manufacturer

Goliath-Werke Borgward & Co.
- Company type: Automobile Manufacturing
- Industry: Automotive
- Founded: 1928
- Founder: Carl F. W. Borgward; Wilhelm Tecklenborg
- Defunct: 1961
- Headquarters: Bremen, Germany
- Products: Vehicles; Automotive parts
- Parent: Borgward

Goliath-Werke Borgward & Co. was a German car manufacturer started by Carl F. W. Borgward and Wilhelm Tecklenborg in 1928, and was part of the Borgward group. Goliath was based in Bremen and specialized in three-wheeler cars and trucks and medium-sized cars. Their vehicles were sold under the Goliath brand.

== Early history ==
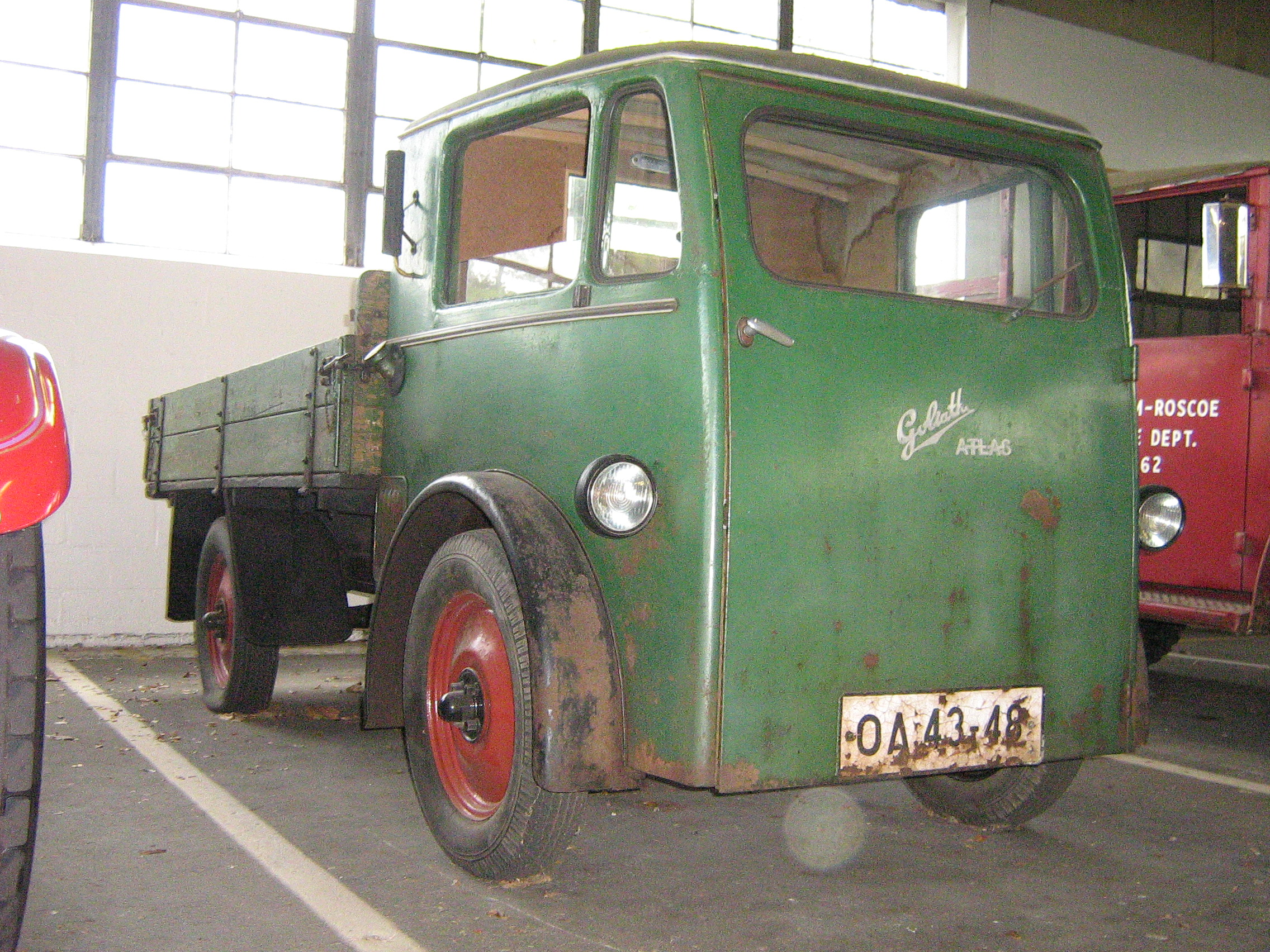
Goliath Atlas (1934)

The first models were three-wheeler trucks derived from the motorcycle based Blitzkarren, Goliath Rapid, and Standard previously built by Borgward.

In 1926 appeared the Goliath K1 four-wheeler freight truck with open cab, followed by the 1929 Goliath Express, and with closed driver cab the 1932 Goliath Atlas, also sold as Hansa-Lloyd Atlas.

The first passenger car was the Goliath Pionier in 1931, which still had three wheels and a one-cylinder engine. Until 1934, 4,000 of these small cars were produced in various types of body.

In 1933, Goliath F200 and F400 three-wheeler trucks derived were derived from Goliath Pionier. The Pionier was redesigned to its successor marketed under the brand Hansa as models 400 and 500 four-wheel passenger car with a sheet metal body. In 1938, also changed to a sheet metal body were the FW200 and FW400 as successor of the F200 and F400.

== After World War II ==
=== Personal car models ===
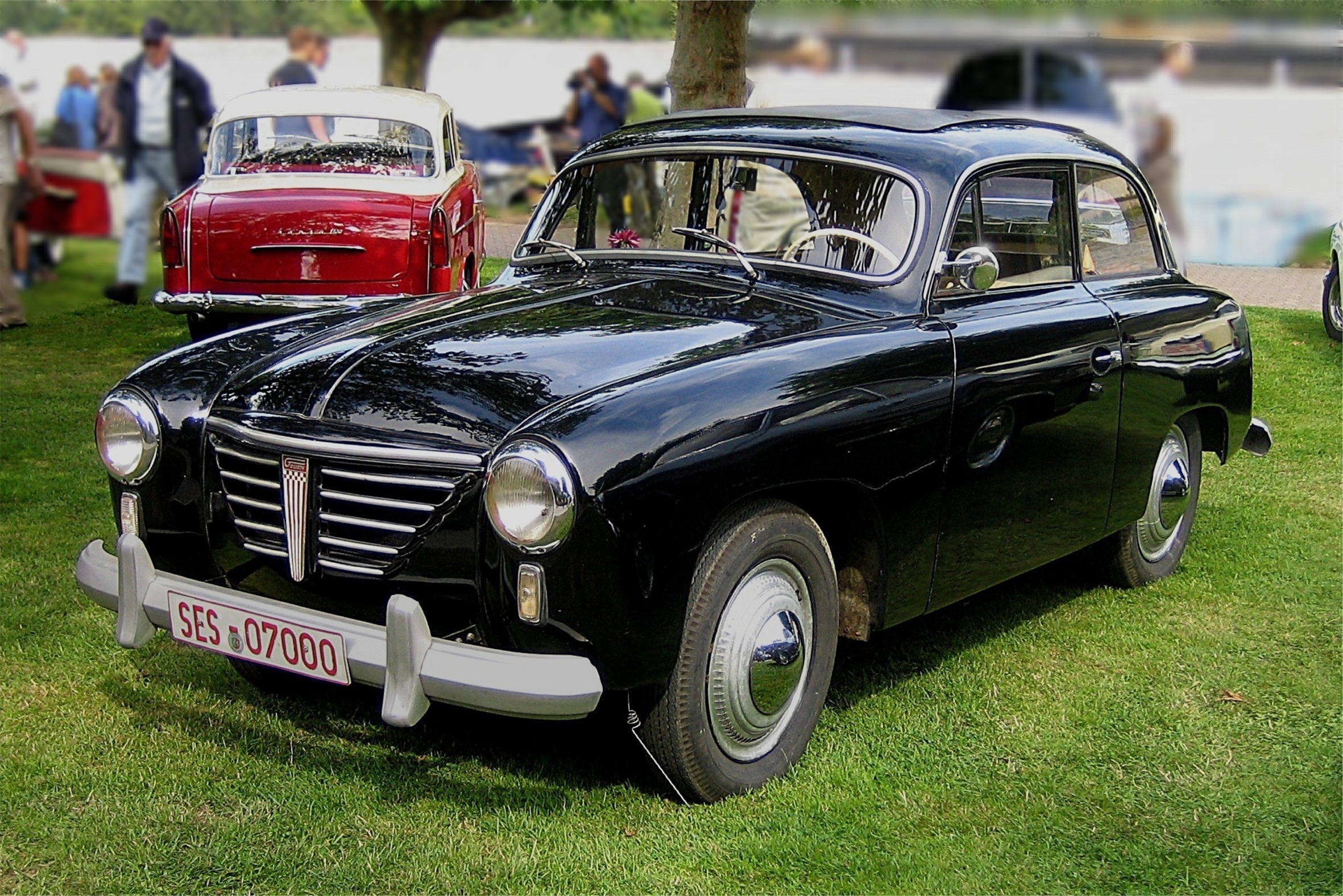
Goliath GP700 2-door saloon

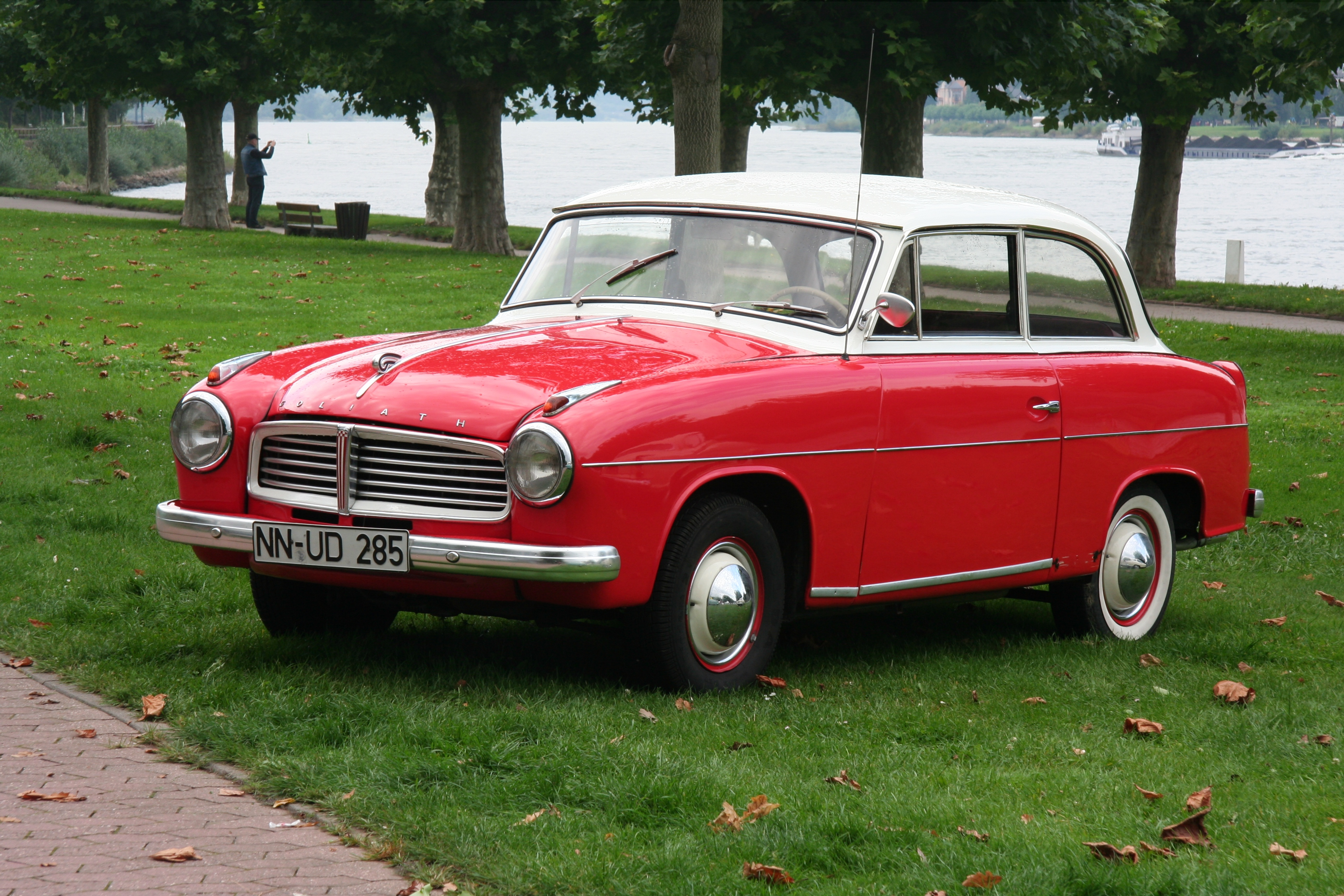
Goliath 1100 2-door saloon

These were front-wheel-drive two-door sedans, station wagons and coupes.

- Goliath GP700 (1950–1957) — inline-two-cylinder, two-stroke, water-cooled, transverse engine (anticipating the Mini and many recent cars). In 1952 Goliath introduced Bosch direct fuel injection, around the same time as the Gutbrod Superior 600; they were the first two cars to use this technology.
- Goliath GP900 (1955–1957) — inline-two-cylinder, two-stroke, water-cooled, transverse engine, available Bosch direct fuel injection.
- Goliath 1100 (1957–1958) — four-cylinder opposed four-stroke water-cooled engine. Renamed "Hansa 1100" to shake the three-wheeled minitruck image.
- Goliath Empress (1953–1961)

=== Light trucks ===
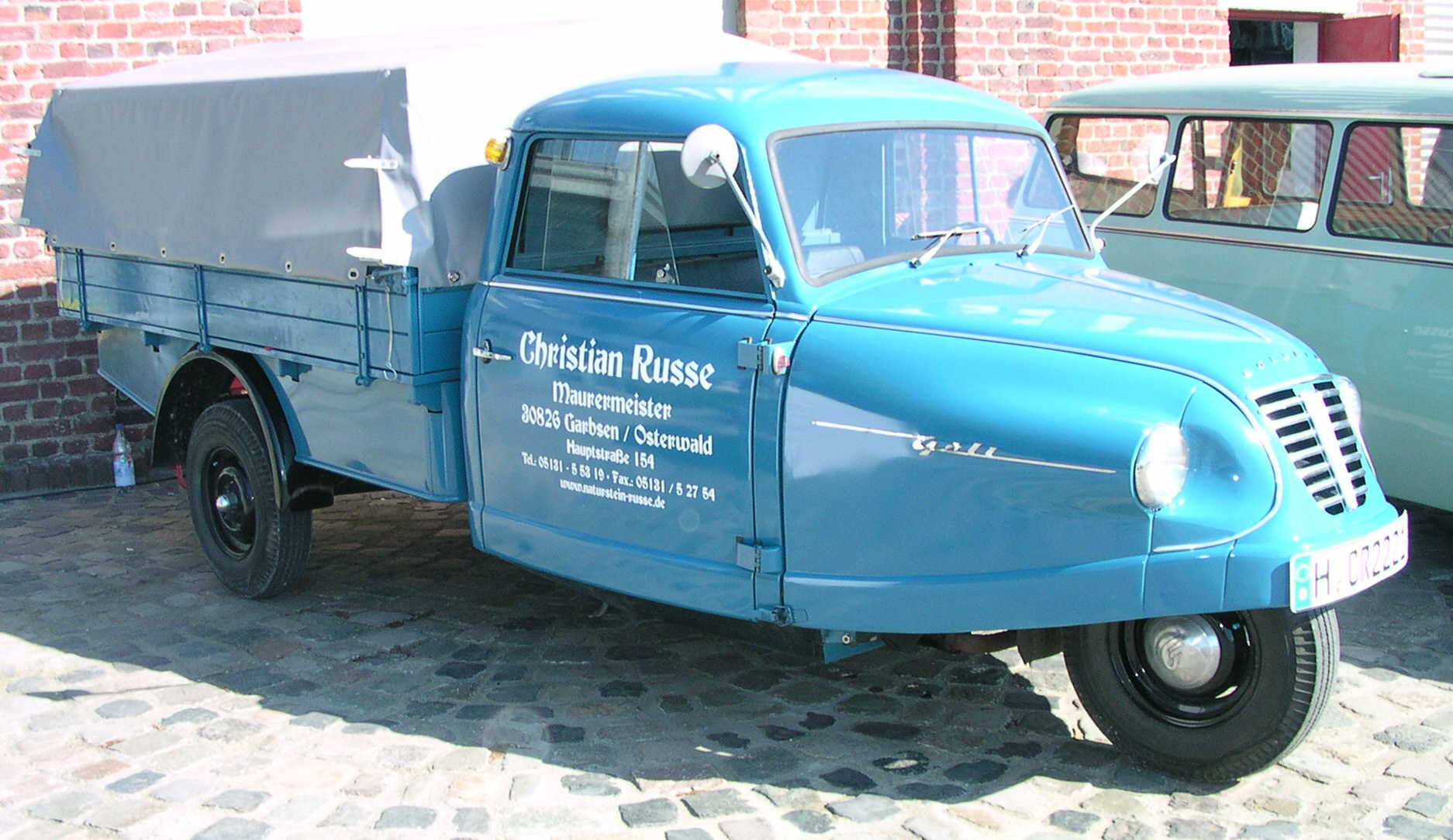
Goliath Goli three-wheeler pickup

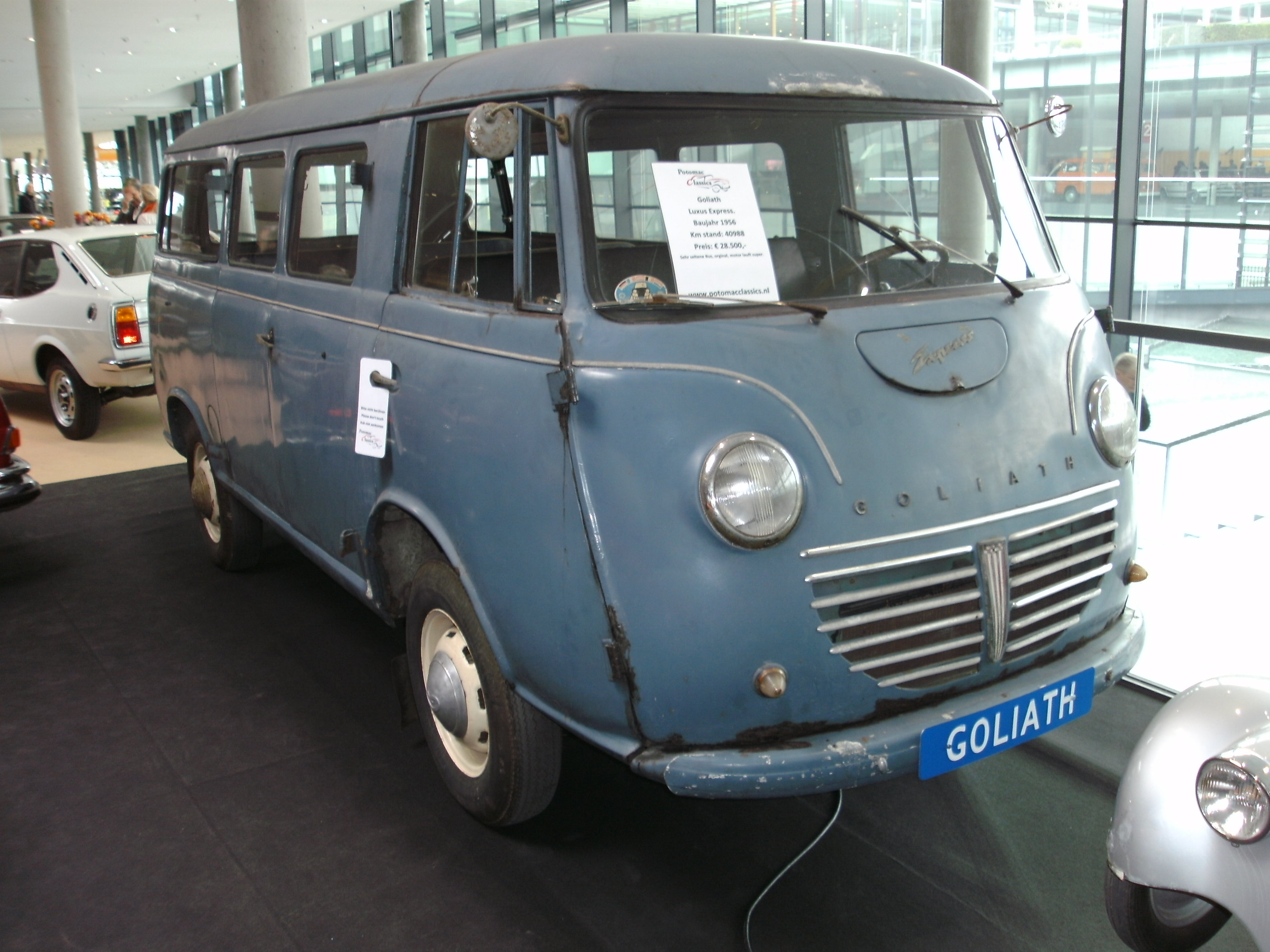
1956 Goliath Express

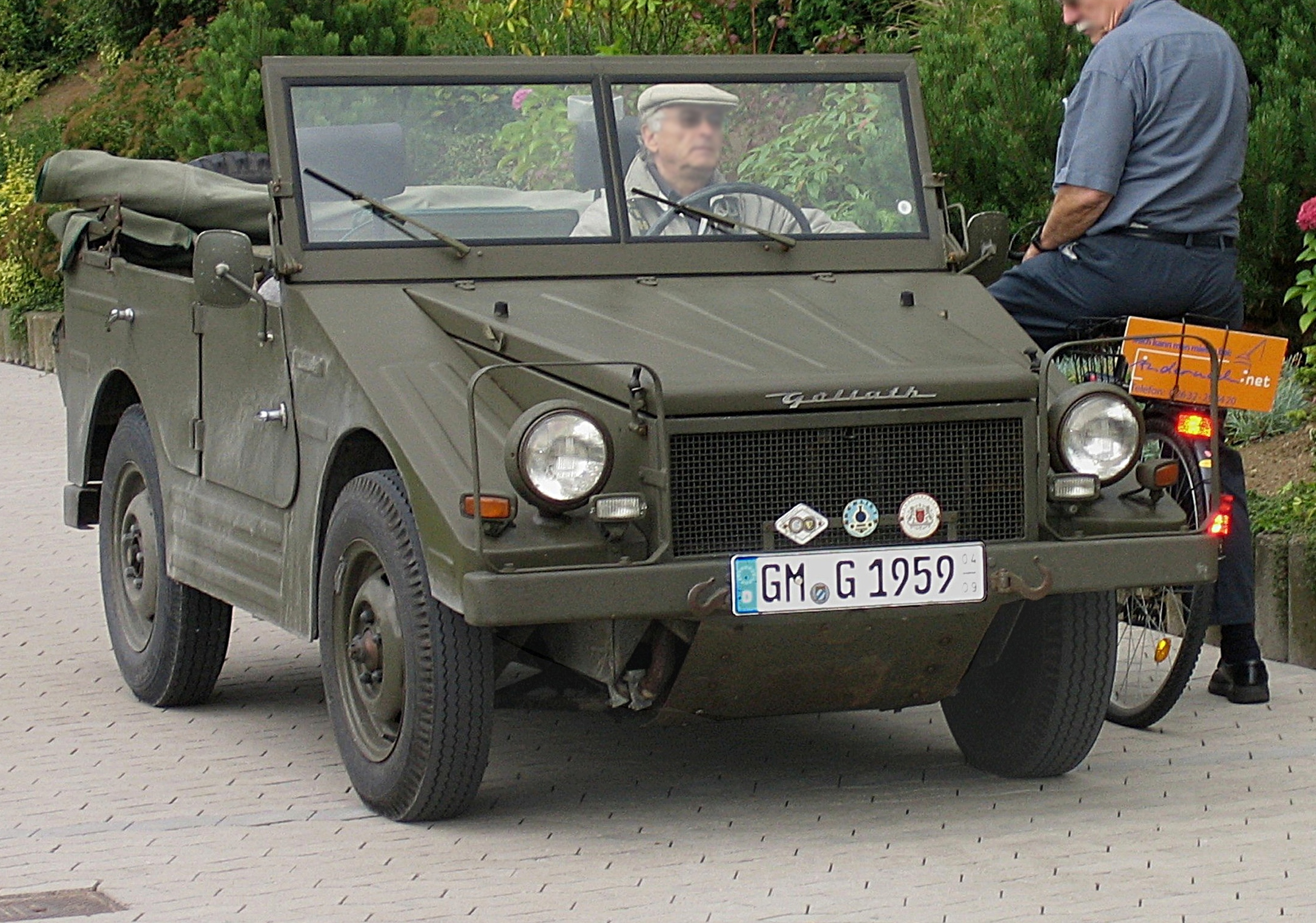
Goliath Jagdwagen

- Goliath F400 three-wheeler (1933–1937)
- Goliath FW400 three-wheeler (1938–1939)
- Goliath GD750 three-wheeler (1949–1955)
- Goliath Goli three-wheeler (1955–1961)
- Goliath GV800 (1951–1953)
- Goliath Express (1953–1961). A front engined, front wheel drive design offered in pickup, panel van and windowed van bodystyles. Available with the 688cc engine from the GP700, the 886cc unit from the GP900 and, from 1957, with a new 1093cc engine.

== The end ==
From 1958, the Goliath 1100 models were sold under the brand Hansa; the Borgward group wanted to downplay the two-stroke engine and three-wheeler image.

Three years later, in 1961, the Borgward group collapsed.
