= F400 =

F400, F.400 or F-400 may refer to:

- ESP F-400, an ESP Guitars model
- Farman F.400, a 1934 French three-seat cabin aircraft
- Ferrari 400, a 1976 sports car
- Goliath F400, a 1933 three-wheeler freight truck
