= Goliath Atlas =

German truck

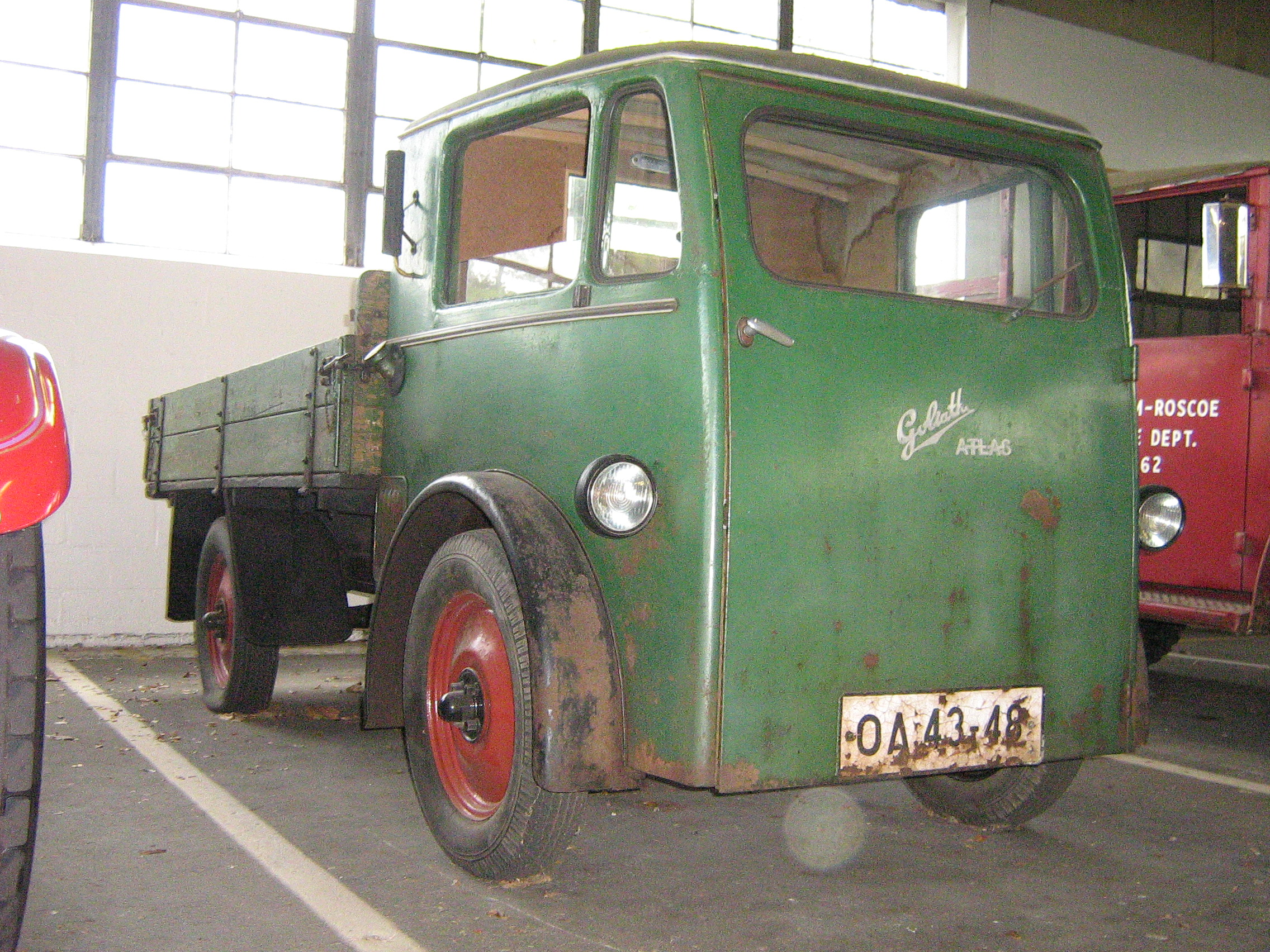
- 1934 Goliath Atlas

Overview
- Manufacturer: Hansa-Lloyd and Goliath-Werke Borgward & Tecklenburg
- Also called: Hansa-Lloyd Atlas
- Production: Goliath Company, Bremen, Germany
- Model years: 1932–1935

Body and chassis
- Layout: MR layout

Powertrain
- Engine: 2 cylinder two-stroke engine Power 14 HP
- Transmission: 3-speed gear-box

Dimensions
- Wheelbase: 2,310 mm (90.95 in)
- Length: 3,750 mm (147.64 in)
- Width: 1,450 mm (57.09 in)
- Height: 1,700 mm (66.93 in)
- Curb weight: 1 t (2,205 lb)

Chronology
- Predecessor: 1929 Goliath Express
- Successor: Goliath Rekord

The Goliath Atlas also sold as Hansa-Lloyd Atlas is an cab over truck that was produced from 1932 to 1935 in Bremen, Germany. It was not the first, but an early one ton freight trucks of the German Goliath Company and it got a closed driver cab. The engine had a displacement of 594 cc with a bore of 69 mm and a stroke of 80 mm. The engine produced 14 hp at 2500 revolutions per minute. Its top speed was 64 km/h (40 mph). The front track was 1310 mm, the rear track was 1275 mm. The wheelbase was 2310 mm. The vehicle had a turning circle of 12,000 mm. It was an improvement of the 1929 Goliath Express, transporting 0.8 metric tons (0.88 short tons) and up to 50 km/h (31 mph), and its predecessor 1926 Goliath K1, transporting 0.5 metric tons (0.55 short tons), both with open cab.

As later microcars like the Isetta or the Zündapp Janus, it had a front door only, to enter the cab. A fixed steering column and a door hinge on the left, required the passenger to exit first.

Original cost were: 2450 Reichsmark.

== Competitors ==
- Magirus M10
