= Goliath GV800 =

German truck

Overview
- Manufacturer: Goliath
- Production: Goliath Company, Bremen, Germany
- Model years: June 1951 – June 1952

Body and chassis
- Body style: Pickup truck or Panel van
- Layout: MR layout

Powertrain
- Engine: 465 cc 16 hp, two cylinder two-stroke engine
- Transmission: gear-box, 3-speed manual

Dimensions
- Wheelbase: 2,000 mm (79 in)
- Length: 4,140 mm (163 in)
- Width: 1,690 mm (67 in)
- Height: 1,750 mm (69 in)
- Curb weight: 830–1,630 kg (1,830–3,594 lb)

Chronology
- Predecessor: none
- Successor: Goliath GV800A

The Goliath GV800 was a light freight truck built in the early 1950s in Bremen, Germany. It also was available as panel van and reached up to 37 mph (60 km/h). It was announced in March 1951.

The starter battery and electric was 6 volts only. Due performance the 16 hp engine was upgraded to 21 hp and the improved vehicle was sold as modell GV800A.

It was a four wheeler in parallel production of the three-wheeler freight carts, at this time the Goliath GD750, increasing those maximum freight load 750 kg to 800 kg.

Goliath GV800A

Overview
- Manufacturer: Goliath
- Production: Goliath Company, Bremen, Germany
- Model years: July 1952 – December 1953

Body and chassis
- Body style: Pickup truck or Panel van
- Layout: MR layout

Powertrain
- Engine: 586 cc 21 hp, two cylinder two-stroke engine
- Transmission: gear-box, 4-speed manual

Dimensions
- Wheelbase: 2,400 mm (94 in)
- Length: 4,540 mm (179 in)
- Width: 1,770 mm (70 in)
- Height: 1,750 mm (69 in)
- Curb weight: 885–1,650 kg (1,951–3,638 lb)

Chronology
- Predecessor: Goliath 800
- Successor: Goliath Express

The Goliath GV800A was the engine improved successor of the GV800, now reaching a top speed of 47 mph (75 km/h).

This version had a weak construction of the frame and that adequate reliably mirrored in Bordward's reputation. The frame was not reworked or redesigned, but the production was stopped and the produced vehicles were sold off.

The sales price per vehicle was 5425 to 6425 DM per body variation.

Including the predecessor, a total of 4016 vehicles were built.

== Competitors ==
- VW T1

Very similar looking competitors were:

- Tempo Matador / Wiking
- Gutbrod Atlas
