= Goliath F400 =

German pickup transporter

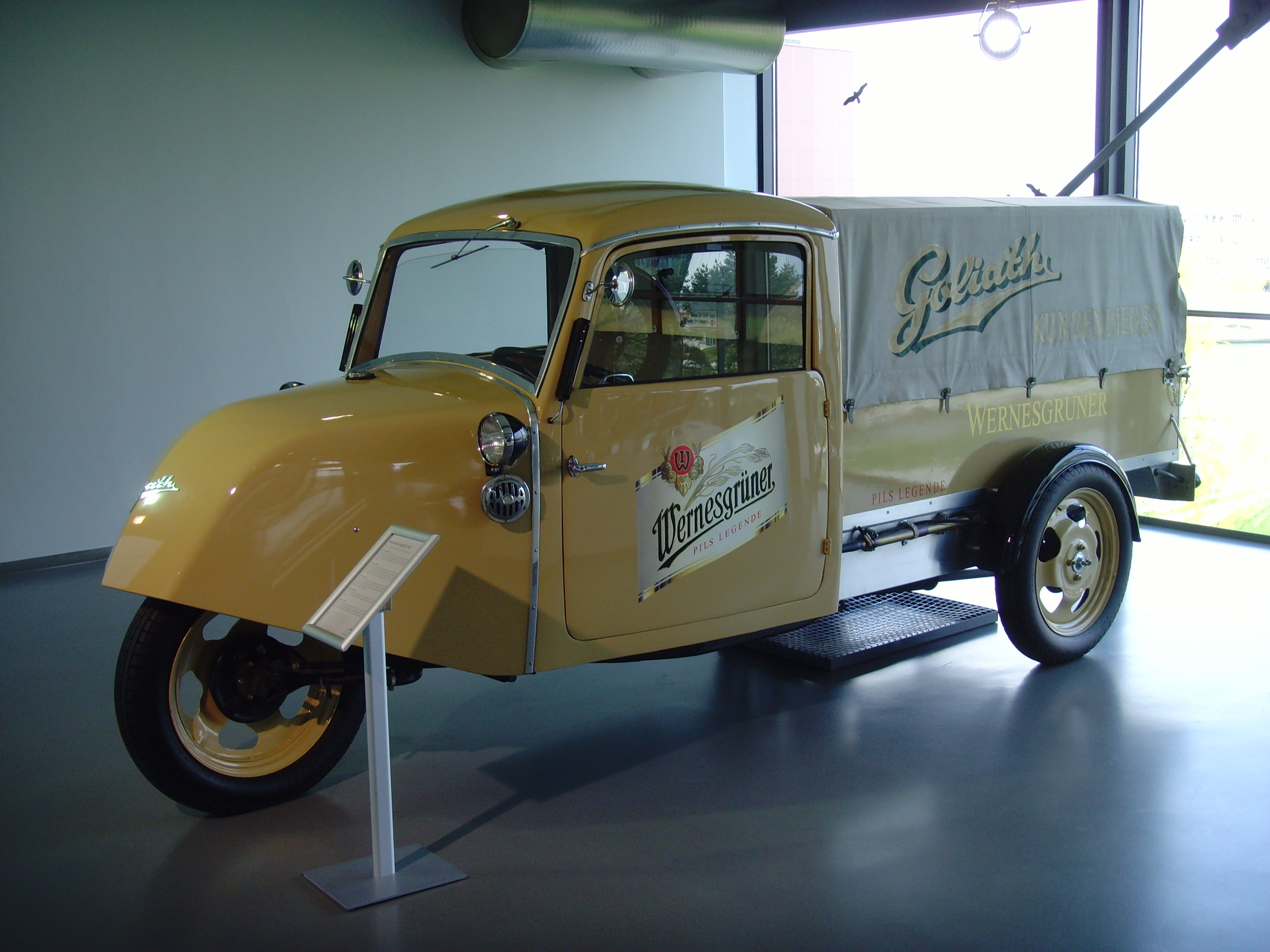
- 1936 Goliath F400

Overview
- Manufacturer: Goliath
- Also called: Goliath F200 (with small engine)
- Production: Goliath Company, Bremen, Germany
- Model years: 1933-1937

Body and chassis
- Body style: Pickup truck or Panel van
- Layout: MR layout
- Related: Goliath Pionier, Hansa 400

Powertrain
- Engine: 198 cc 4.4 kW two-stroke engine or 396 cc 9.5 kW
- Transmission: gear-box, 3-speed manual

Dimensions
- Curb weight: Maximum Load: 0,75 t

Chronology
- Predecessor: Goliath Rapid/Standard; Blitzkarren
- Successor: Goliath FW400, Goliath GD750

The Goliath F400 is a three-wheeled pickup transporter, made by Hansa-Lloyd and Goliath Company Borgward & Tecklenborg in Bremen, Germany which was sold under the brand Goliath. It was based on the three-wheeled passenger car Goliath Pionier with a closed timber-framed wood cab.

Unlike the Pionier, a three-wheel microcar, the rear of the F400 has a longer box as a panel van or a framed flatbed as a pickup truck. The rear axle was mounted on leaf springs, and the engine was under the seat. The front wheel was guided on a single swingarm. The body had a reclined front, externally mounted headlights and unlike the Goliath Pionier not a vertical, but a tilted windshield to reduce wind drag. The maximum speed of the "Quick Transport Vehicle" (Schnelltransporter) was 30 mph. It was equipped with an air-cooled two-cylinder two-stroke engine with 12 to 13.6 hp reached by a 396 cc engine displacement with a bore 60 mm and stroke 70 mm. The rear wheels were driven by a cardan shaft.

The F200 was identical except for its smaller 198 cc single cylinder engine with just 6 hp. The maximum load specified for the F200 was only 500 kg, however, in place of the 750 kg maximum for the F400. For a short time, the F200 and F400 were leaders in this market segment with a total production of 18,368 vehicles.

In 1935 an in-house manufactured 398 cc engine made its way in production. Other engines as well the smaller 198 cc engine from model 200 were produced by ILO-Motorenwerke. The reason for the half downsized 198cc engine was to meet the legal limit for license-free drivers and for tax credit eligibility.

Predecessors of both models were open cab, motorbike based three-wheel freight carts Goliath Rapid/Standard, built 1926 to 1933 and Blitzkarren (Flashcart), built 1924 to 1927. Both these positioned the driver right at the back, behind the load platform, and although they are frequently described as predecessors of the F400, some commentators have objected to the description, pointing out that the F400 had virtually nothing in common with the earlier vehicles, which sold in different, but also in common periods.

== Goliath FW400 ==
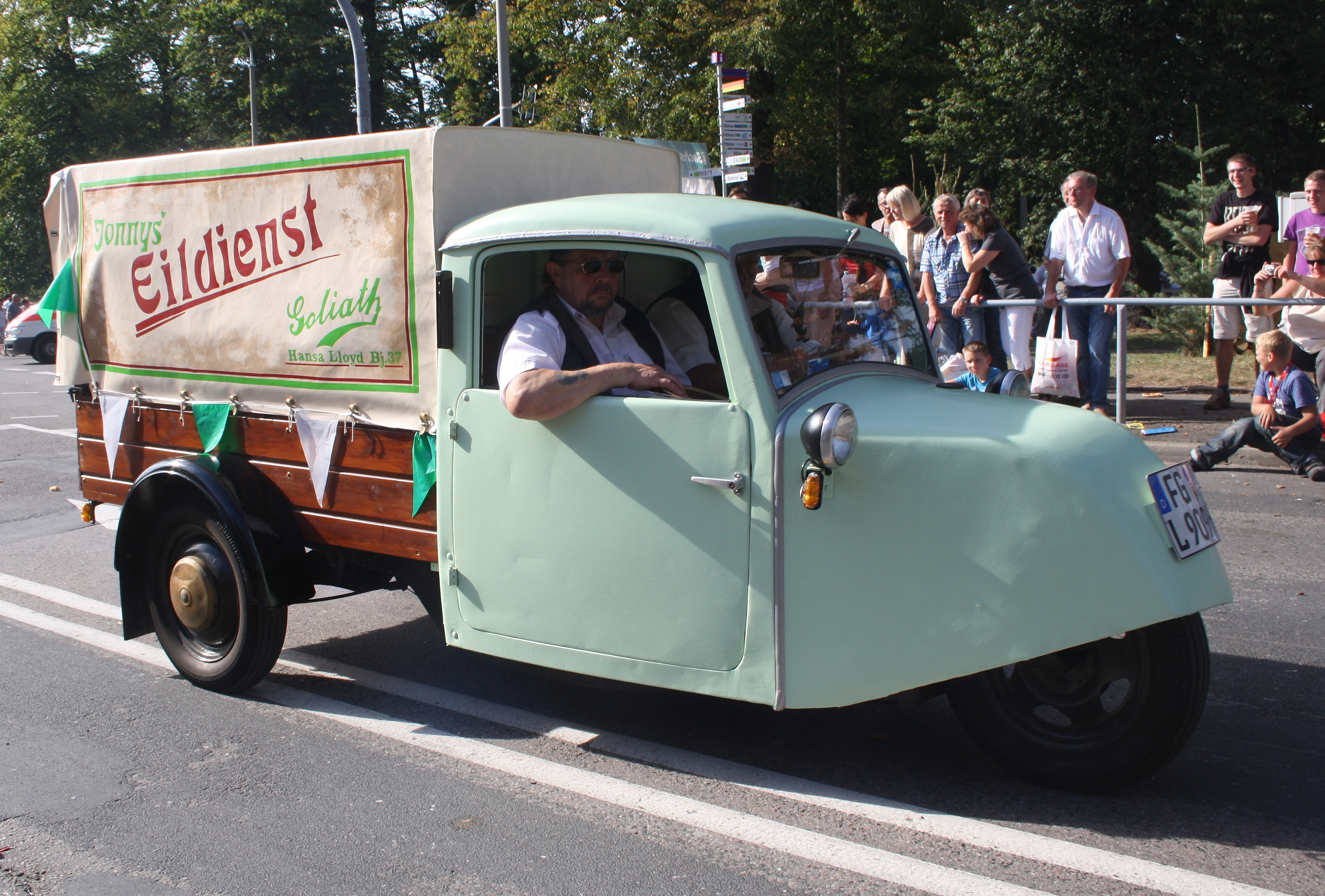
1937 Goliath F400

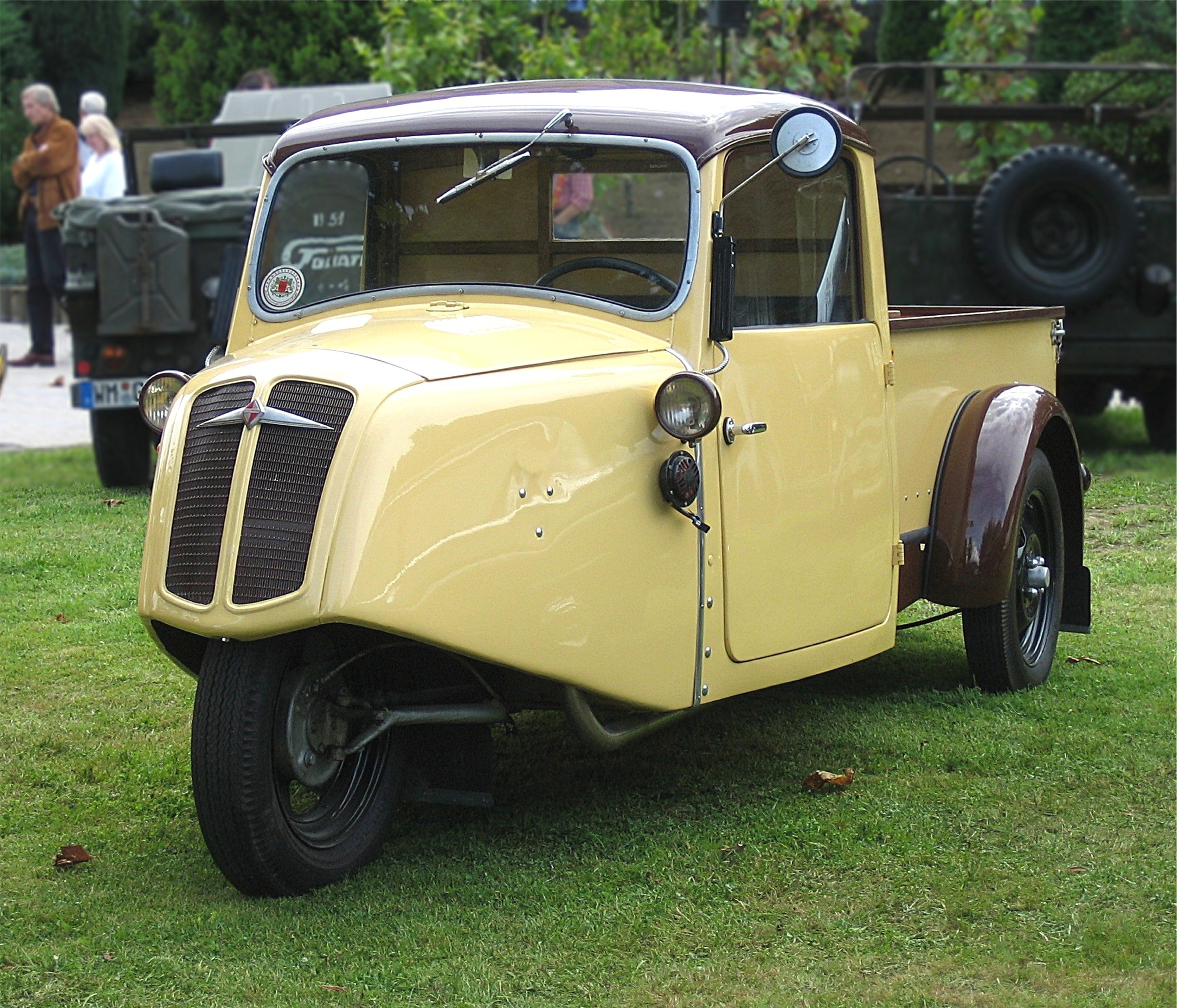
1938 Borgward FW200

With the next generation, the wood-made body went out of production and the metal body, a grill and a thermosiphon passive water cooling came to the Goliath FW400. The windshield got tilted a bit more. The production periods were between 1938 and 1939. The vehicles were also sold under the brand Borgward.

In the passenger car version, the Goliath Pionier also changed in 1934 to the next model Hansa 400 and got a metal body with two fenders beside the hood and four wheels on the road, sold under the brand Hansa.

== Competitors ==
Competitors of the F200 and F400

- Tempo D200 and D400, a very similar three-wheel freight cart, except its front wheel drive had the engine on top the front wheel, which affected the vehicles balance
- Framo LH200 and LH300, similar front wheel drive
- Gutbrod Standard P203 and P503, a very similar three-wheel freight cart, except it had the engine in the tail, under the flatbed

Competitors of the FW200 and FW400

- Tempo E400
- Framo D500
- Gutbrod Standard E1

Later

- Piaggio Ape, with production started in 1948, but is still on the market

== External links and references ==
- Christoph Bauer: Drive it! – Three-wheeled History: The Goliath F400, DW-TV – motor mobil, 3 January 2017 (YouTube)
- Pictures of the F400
- List of remaining Goliath vehicles, retrieved February 2019
