= Goliath GP700 =

German automobile made 1950-1957

Goliath GP700 Goliath GP900
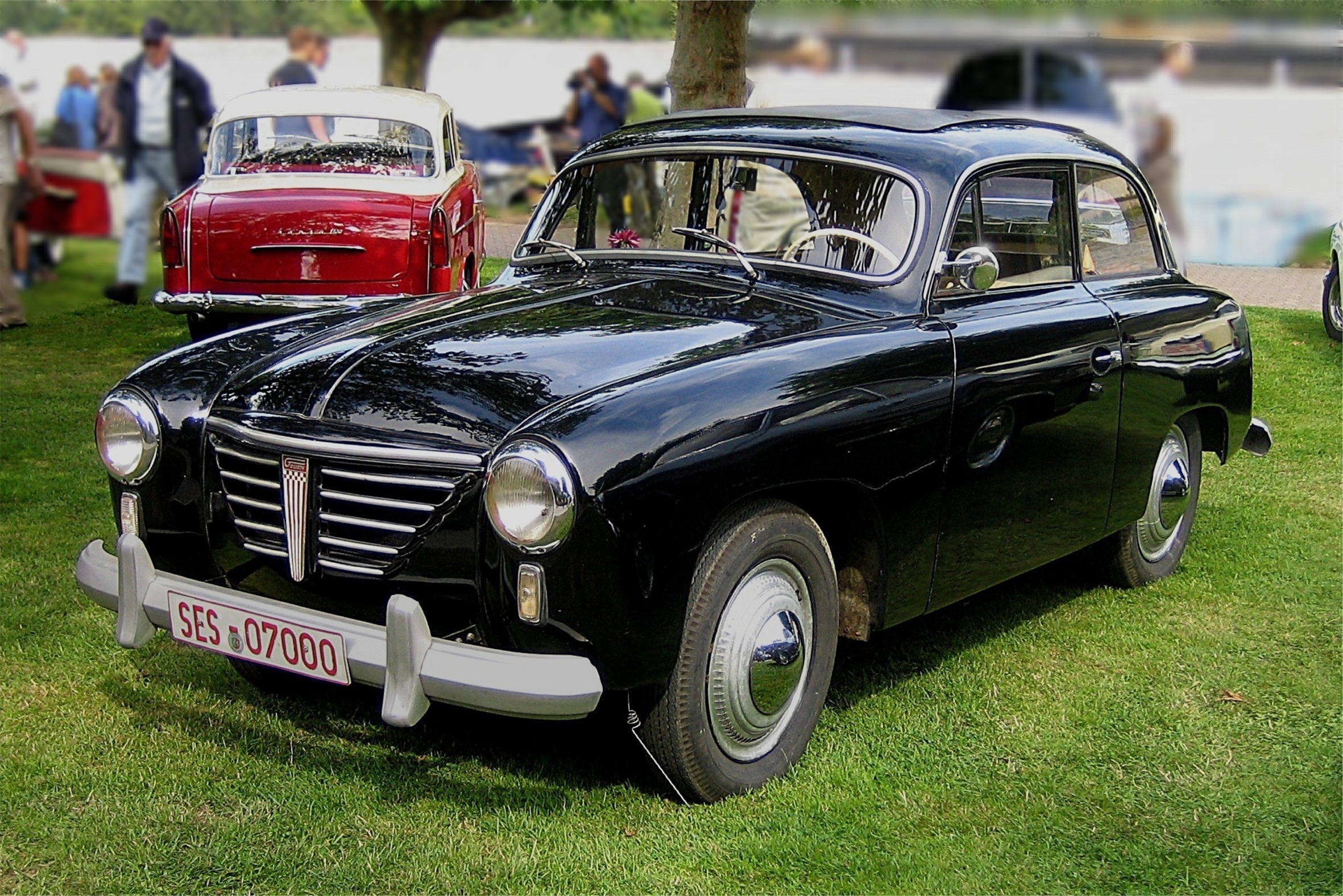
- Goliath GP700 2-door saloon

Overview
- Manufacturer: Carl F. W. Borgward GmbH
- Production: 1950–1957 GP700; 1955–1957 GP900; 1951–1953 GP700 Sport

Body and chassis
- Body style: 2-door saloon, 2-door saloon cabriolet, 3-door estate, 2-door Sport coupé 2-door panel van
- Layout: FF layout

Powertrain
- Engine: 688 cc straight-2 2-stroke (GP 700); 886 cc straight-2 2-stroke (GP 900); 845 cc straight-2 2-stroke (GP 700 Sport)
- Transmission: 4-speed manual all-synchromesh from 1952

Dimensions
- Wheelbase: 2,300 mm (90.6 in)
- Length: 4,050–4,150 mm (159.4–163.4 in)
- Width: 1,630 mm (64.2 in)
- Height: 1,470 mm (57.9 in)
- Curb weight: 903 kg (1,991 lb)

Chronology
- Successor: Goliath 1100

The Goliath GP700 is a small automobile which was manufactured by the Bremen, Germany–based Borgward subsidiary Goliath-Werke Borgward & Co from 1950 to 1957. In 1955, the GP700 was joined by the larger-engined Goliath GP900 E. From 1951 to 1953, a coupé version, the Goliath GP700 Sport was offered. The Goliath was a revolutionary design, which in several important respects pointed the way for automobile development in the second half of the 20th century.

== Goliath and Borgward ==
The Goliath business had been established in 1928 by the entrepreneurial engineer Carl Borgward in partnership with Wilhelm Tecklenburg. During the 1930s, Goliath had specialised in producing small three-wheeled vans and passenger cars. The plant had been bombed to destruction during the war, but in 1949 Goliath managed to introduce a small three-wheeled delivery vehicle. The announcement, in 1950, of a four-wheel passenger car represented something of a break with the company's past.

== Chronology ==
The small Goliath first appeared at the Geneva Motor Show in March 1950. By the time of the Frankfurt Motor Show in April 1951, it had acquired the name under which it would subsequently be marketed, and a light-weight two-door coupé sibling. The next year a cabriolet version of the saloon and a small estate version completed the range.

During the life of the model, it benefited from various modifications and upgrades. Among the more significant of these was the introduction in 1955 of the 886 cc-engined GP 900 E model: with a 38% increase in claimed power output, the new model offered a useful performance advantage over the modestly powered GP700 which nevertheless continued in production.

The body and equipment levels also changed progressively during the car's model life. In 1952, the car acquired a heater and the size of the back window was increased.

The Goliath 1100 – introduced in 1957 – is a substantially restyled continuation of the GP700 model, but it also represents a significant move upmarket with a larger four-stroke four-cylinder engine, anticipating by nearly a decade the switch away from two-stroke power plants by other members of the two-stroke club.

== Revolutionary ==
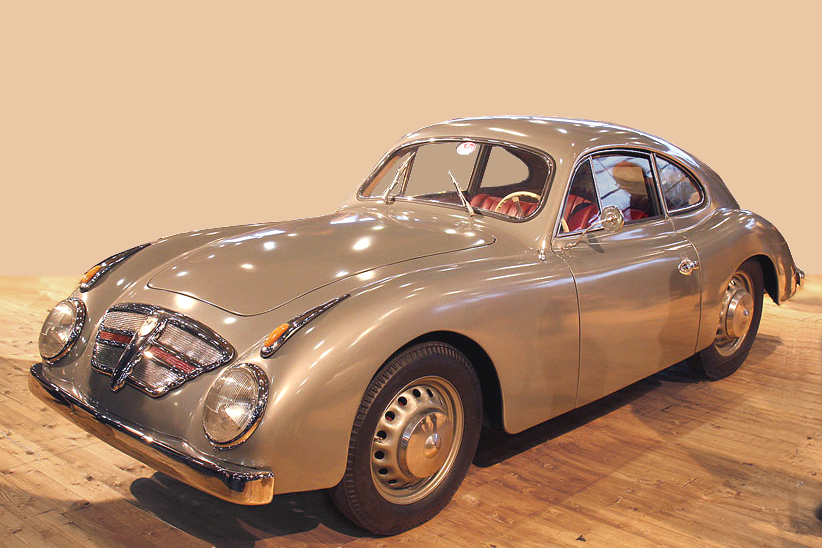
It may have looked like a smaller version of the Porsche 356, but the Goliath GP700 Sport coupé had a transverse engine and front-wheel drive.

The GP700's Ponton, three-box design reflected the silhouette of Borgward's Hansa 1500 introduced the year before. Ten years later, the ponton format automobile had become mainstream, but in 1950, while Opel and Mercedes Benz were still selling cars with designs dating back to the 1930s, the Goliath's design was bold and innovative. The wings were fully integrated into the bodywork, and the passenger cabin filled the full width of the car. Volkswagen would follow suit only in 1961.

Another aspect of the car in respect of which the full significance became obvious only when adopted by other manufacturers was its front-mounted engine, installed transversely along with the gearbox, which drove the front wheels. It was thereby possible to advertise the car as a five-seater even though the wheelbase was of only 2.3 metres (91 in).

The GP700 Sport appeared in 1952 with a Bosch fuel injection system. The Sport model was produced only in very limited numbers, but shortly afterwards fuel injection also became available on the GP700 saloon (designated GP700 E: E stood for “Einspritzung”) as an alternative to the carburetor-equipped version. When the larger-engined GP900 E appeared, it was available only with the Bosch fuel injection. This is a Goliath feature that would be taken up across the auto industry during the balance of the twentieth century: however, the fuel-injected GP700 E appeared five years before the fuel-injected Mercedes-Benz 300 SL.

Yet another innovation, available from 1952 on the GP700 and which subsequently became mainstream was the all-synchromesh, four-speed gearbox.

== The Engine ==
The GP700 was propelled by a two-cylinder two-stroke engine of 688 cc. The carburettor version with which the car was launched had a claimed maximum output of 25 bhp (19 kW; 25 PS), which increased to 29 bhp (22 kW; 29 PS) where fuel injection was specified. Claimed maximum speed when the car was launched was 102 km/h (63 mph). Subsequently, the installation of more powerful engines delivered more performance: the bored out 886 cc-engined GP900 E, introduced in 1955, managed a maximum speed of 120 km/h (75 mph) courtesy of an advertised maximum output of 50 bhp (37 kW; 51 PS). The very rare lightweight GP700 sport, offered from 1951 to 1953, its fuel-injected engine enlarged to 845 cc, managed a claimed maximum speed of 125 km/h (78 mph) on the basis of 32 bhp (24 kW; 32 PS).
