= Hansa 400 =

German car

Hansa 400 / Hansa 500

Overview
- Manufacturer: Goliath-Werke Borgward & Co.
- Production: 1933 – 1934

Body and chassis
- Class: Microcar
- Body style: 2-door Sedan; 2-door Convertible
- Layout: RR layout

Powertrain
- Engine: 398 cc / 494 cc two cylinder 2-stroke
- Transmission: 3-speed manual

Dimensions
- Wheelbase: 2,400 mm (94.5 in)
- Length: 3,750 mm (147.6 in)
- Width: 1,360 mm (53.5 in)
- Height: 1,500 mm (59.1 in)
- Curb weight: 620 kg (1,370 lb) (empty)

Chronology
- Predecessor: Goliath Pionier
- Successor: Hansa 1100 from 1934-1939

The Hansa 400 is a microcar made in 1933 to 1934 by Hansa Lloyd and Goliath Company, Borgward & Tecklenborg in Bremen, Germany. After about a year in production, it was replaced by the next model Hansa 500 with a bigger engine.

== History ==
In 1933, as successor and to supplement the three-wheeled Goliath Pionier, Hansa Lloyd presented the four-wheeled small Hansa 400 car. With this generation the single front wheel disappeared and two fenders beside the hood covered the wheels. After the Great Depression, during the emerging society of Nazi Germany, many people improved by the rising economy again, and the loud and weakly motorized small car was hardly in demand.

Still within the first year of appearing on the market, or according to others in the second year, the successor Hansa 500 with bigger engine appeared. He also did not let the design become a sales success. The magazine "Auto und Kraftrad" (Car and motorcycle) described the car as a "trimmed Goliath tricycle".

== Engine, transmission and chassis ==
The two-cylinder two-stroke engine of the Hansa 400 was built by ILO Motorenwerke, and installed in the rear and made 12 HP (8.8 kW) at 3600 rpm and a compression ratio of 5.6 to 1. With a bore of 61 mm and a stroke of 68 mm, the engine displacement was 396 cc. The mixture was separated from a single carburetor made by Solex.

The Hansa 500 had a drilled up engine from the same manufacturer with a capacity of 494 cc (bore × displacement = 68 mm × 68 mm) with 14 HP (10.3 kW) at 3600 RPM. Piston stroke length, compression and carburetor were the same as the smaller model.

The maximum speed of the Hansa 400 was 40 MPH (65 km/h), the Hansa 500 reached up to 44 MPH (70 km/h). All cars had a non-synchronized three-speed gearbox with stick shift in the middle, driving the rear wheels.

The body was assembled on a front and rear forked central frame. The front wheels were suspended on two transverse leaf springs, as well as the rear pendulum on a swing axle. All four wheels were mechanically braked; the handbrake also worked on all four wheels.

The fuel consumption of the Hansa 400 was 29 MPG (8 L/100 km) of two-stroke fuel, that of the Hansa 500 was 27 MPG (8.5 L/100 km). That was rather mediocre for such a small car; the 1934 Hansa 1100 managed 24 MPG (9.5 L/100 km) of regular gasoline, while being significantly larger and more powerful.

== Body variations ==
Both types were as two-suicide door sedan available. The Hansa 500 was also available as a two-door convertible. The bodies consisted of one ash wood frame, covered with leatherette made by the Germany division Weymann-Karosserie of Weymann Fabric Bodies. The streamlined bodies had a rearward tilted vehicle front between the external headlamps. The fenders were swept backwards.

In the same enterprise was a parallel production of a three-wheel freight car, the Goliath F400 with timbered wood body and its successor the Goliath FW400 with steel body. Each were produced also in the "200" single cylinder engine version.

== Competitors ==
- Standard Superior
