= Saxomat =

Type of automatic clutch

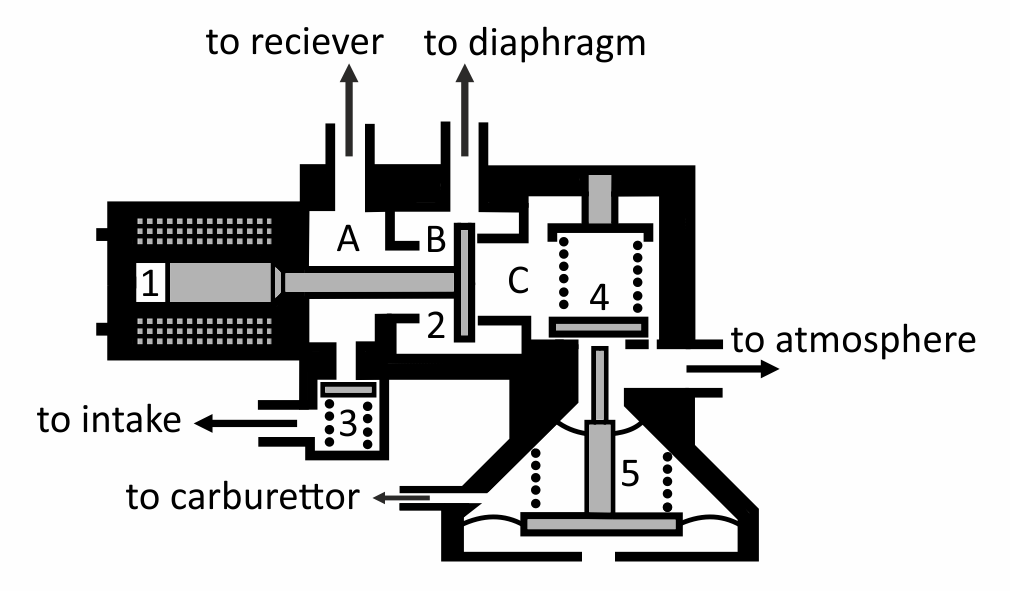
Schematic view of the Saxomat automatic clutch control valves unit: 1 – solenoid, 2 – solenoid valve, 3 – vacuum check valve, 4 – pressure reducing valve, 5 – vacuum regulator valve, A – vacuum chamber, B – intermediate chamber, C – atmosphere chamber. The solenoid valve is shown activated, the clutch is fully depressed.

Saxomat was a type of automatic clutch available as an option on the Fiat 1800, Lancia Flaminia, Saab 93, Borgward Isabella, Goliath/Hansa 1100, Auto Union 1000, Ford Taunus, Trabant, as well as certain models from BMW, Opel, Steyr-Puch, NSU, Glas, Wartburg and Volkswagen. Opel sold it as Olymat; Trabant and Wartburg named the system Hycomat. The Hydrak, used in some Mercedes-Benz vehicles between 1957 and 1961, was a similar system with a hydrodynamic torque converter in place of the Saxomat's centrifugal clutch, this H.T.C. system was standard on the NSU Ro 80 and was optional on the Porsche 911 (Sportomatic). The system also reappeared in the 1990s as Saab Sensonic, but Saab shelved that technology in 1998. Hyundai also introduced a similar concept as the Intelligent Manual Transmission (iMT) in 2020 with the latest generation Hyundai i20.

Cars with a Saxomat clutch did not have a clutch pedal. The Saxomat consisted of two independent systems: the centrifugal clutch, and the servo clutch. The centrifugal clutch was engaged above a certain engine speed by centrifugal force acting on spinning weights inside the clutch, similar to a centrifugal governor.

The servo clutch used an electric switch that supplied manifold vacuum via an actuator valve to a reservoir that disengaged the clutch. The clutch is disengaged automatically whenever the gear-shift lever was touched.

== See also ==
- Semi-automatic transmission
- Automated manual transmission
