= Goliath 1100 =

Goliath 1100 (1957 to 1959) Hansa 1100 (1959 to 1961)
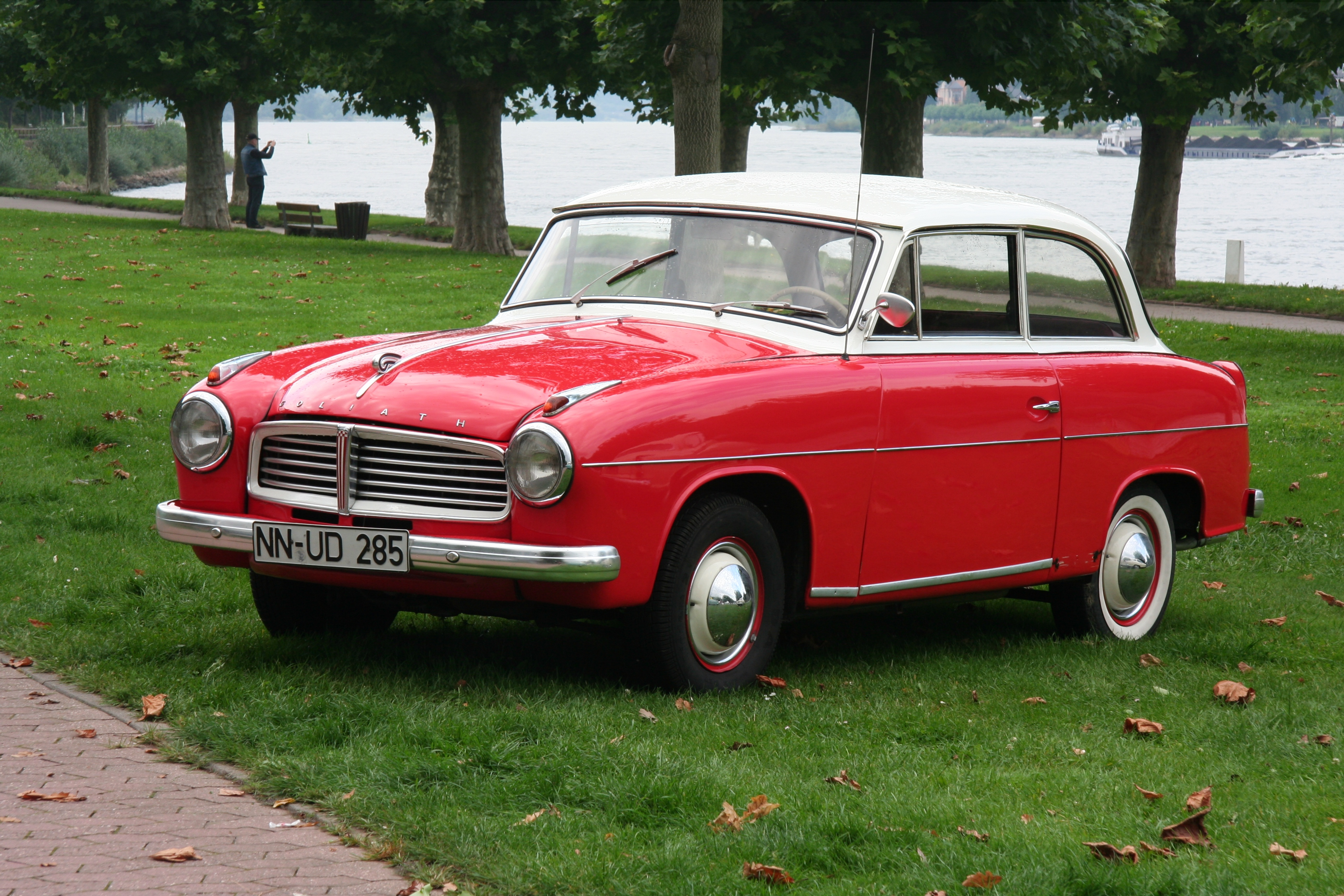
- Goliath 1100 2-door Saloon

Overview
- Manufacturer: Carl F. W. Borgward GmbH
- Also called: Borgward Hansa 1100 (Australia)
- Production: 1957–1961

Body and chassis
- Body style: 2-door saloon 3-door estate 2-door coupé 2-door panel van
- Layout: FF layout

Powertrain
- Engine: 1094 cc 4-cylinder boxer motor
- Transmission: 4-speed manual all-synchromesh Saxomat automatic clutch optional from 1959

Dimensions
- Wheelbase: 2,270 mm (89.4 in)
- Length: 4,060 mm (159.8 in)
- Width: 1,625 mm (64.0 in)
- Height: 1,450 mm (57.1 in)

Chronology
- Predecessor: Goliath GP900

The Goliath 1100 and later the Hansa 1100 is a small automobile that was manufactured from 1957 until 1961 by the Bremen based Goliath-Werke Borgward & Co, a subsidiary of Borgward. A two-door saloon and a three-door kombi (estate) version were available from launch and a two-door coupe was introduced a year later. For 1959, the Goliath name was discontinued and the car was rebadged as the Hansa 1100, recalling Borgward’s prewar model of the same name.

The Goliath 1100 replaced the Goliath GP900 and apart from a completely new engine, little had changed. In place of the GP 700’s two-stroke engine, the 1100 featured a water-cooled boxer motor, an engine format taken up by Subaru several years after the demise of the Goliath brand.

== Goliath and Borgward ==
The Goliath business had been established in 1928 by the entrepreneurial engineer Carl Borgward in partnership with Wilhelm Tecklenburg. The plant had been bombed to destruction during the war, but during the 1950s produced a succession of small front-wheel-drive passenger cars. The Goliath 1100 was the last of these.

== Chronology ==
The Goliath 1100 appeared at the Geneva Motor Show in March 1957. From the outside, it was distinguished from the GP900 by a more modern front grille.

Later in 1957, the 40 bhp (30 kW; 41 PS) 1100 was joined by the 1100 Luxus version. The cars shared the 1094 cc engine displacement, but the Luxus, courtesy of a second carburettor and a higher compression ratio, boasted an output of 55 bhp (41 kW; 56 PS). A maximum speed of 135 km/h (84 mph) compared with 125 km/h (78 mph) claimed for the less powerful car.

In October 1958, the Goliath 1100 was replaced by the Hansa 1100. Hansa had been the brand name used by the business in the 1930s and 1940s. The new Hansa 1100 used most of the same body panels, but it now featured sharper tailfins and a kinked chrome strip along the car’s flank. An optional Saxomat automatic clutch was offered.

== Other countries ==
Established by the family Taubenfeld, according to an agreement signed between it and the Goliath BmgH Werk Bremen, Germany. The Hansa 1100 Luxus are made in Argentina by Goliath Hansa Argentina in the city of Villa Constitución, Santa Fe for the 1960–1961 years in three versions: Sedán de Lujo, Combi and Súper cupé Lujo. With a capital of $3,350,000, began operations on May 2, 1960, and September 15 began work on the construction of a 19,000 m² manufacturing plant.

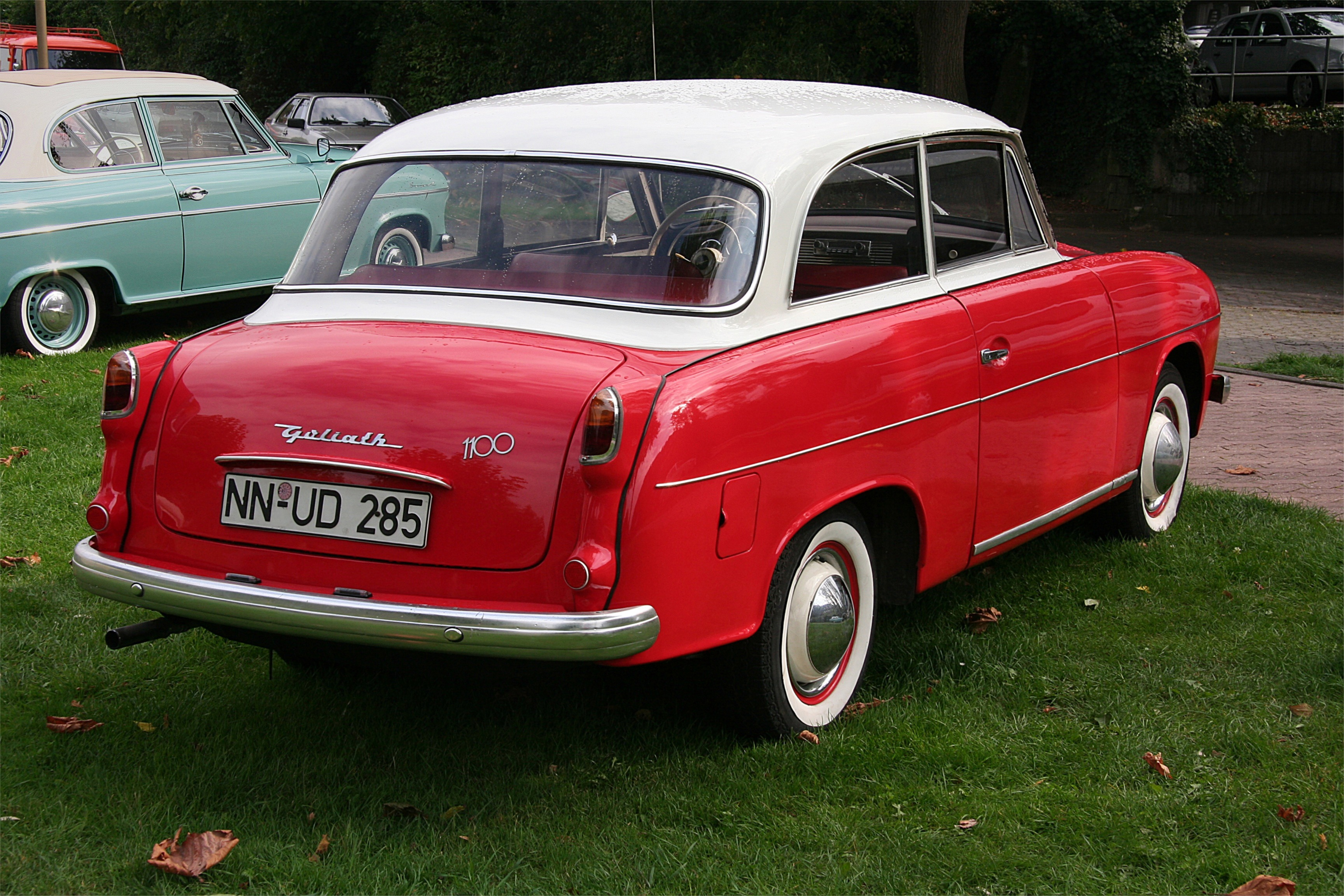
Goliath 1100 2-door Saloon. After the 1959 name change to Hansa, the 1100 acquired sharper tailfins

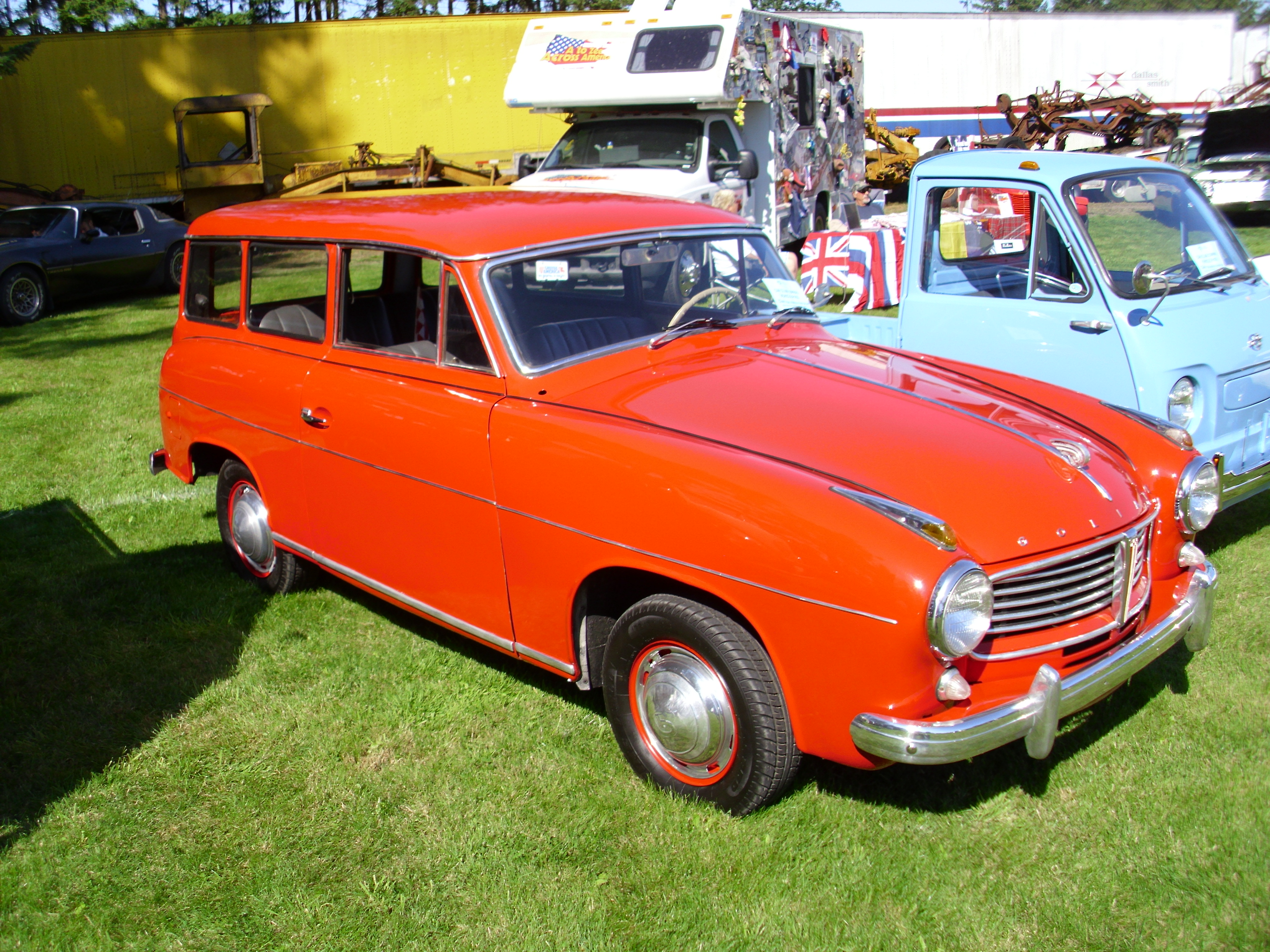
Goliath 1100 Combi

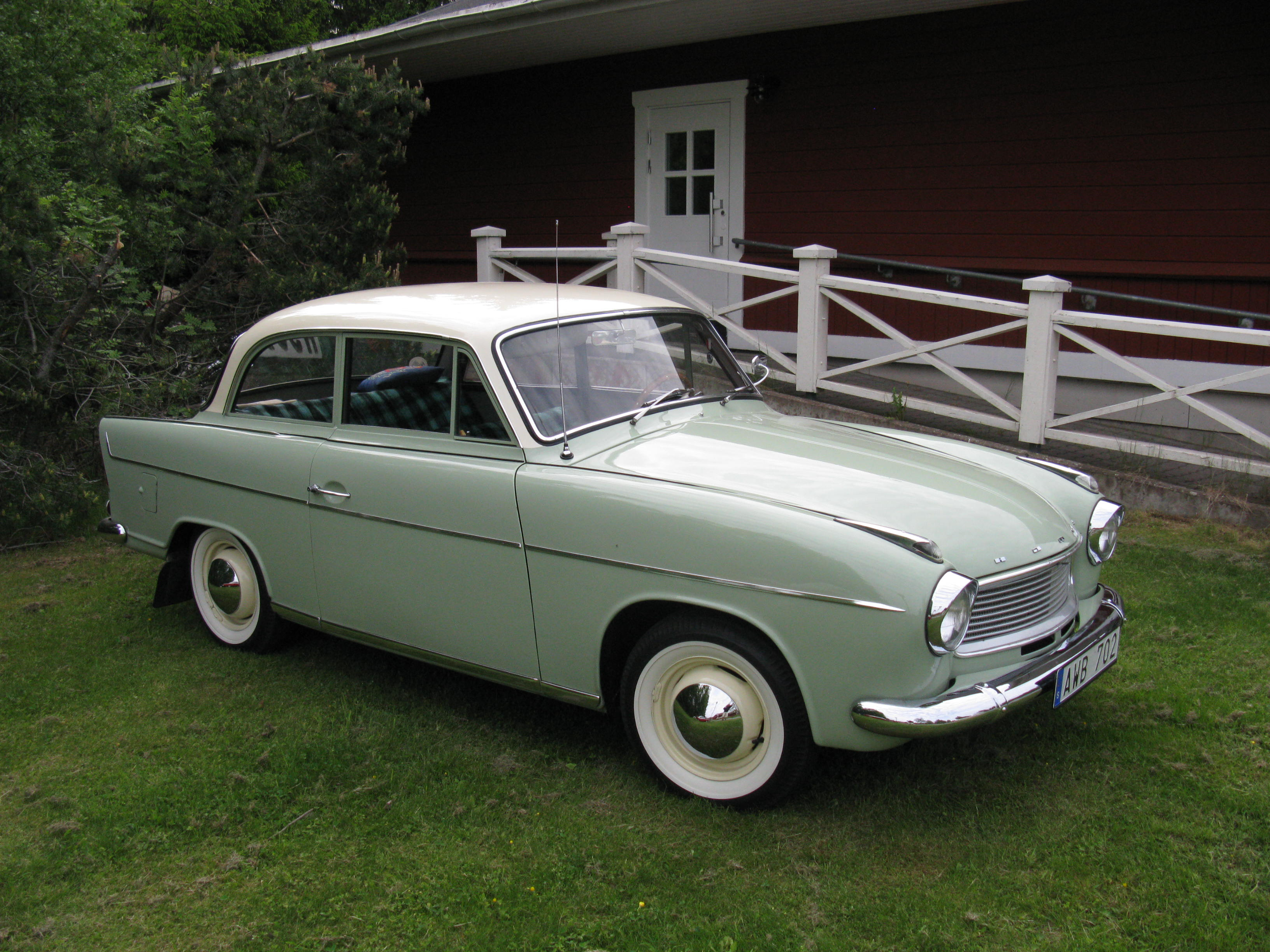
Hansa 1100 2-door Saloon

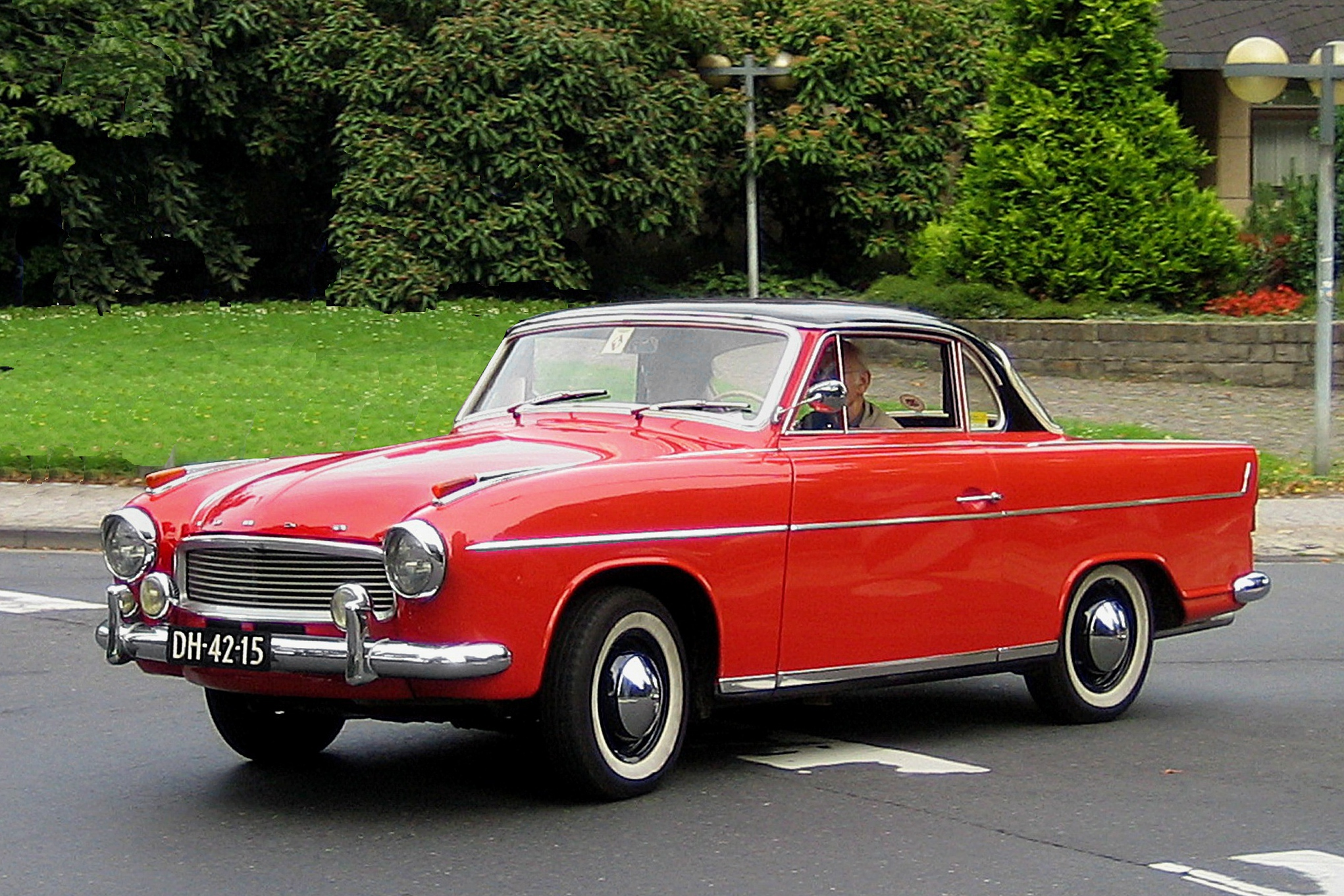
Hansa 1100 Coupe

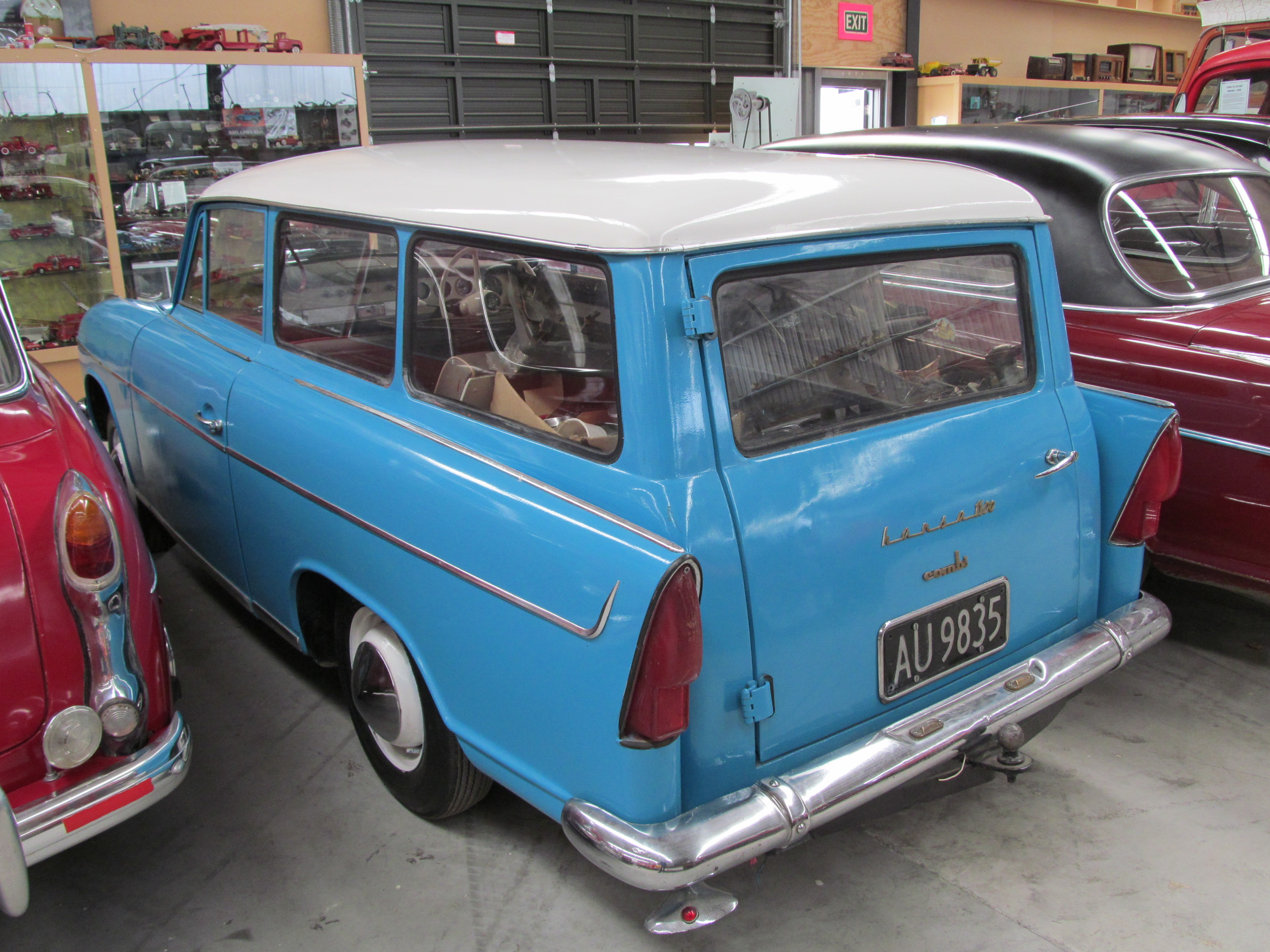
Hansa 1100 Combi (station wagon)

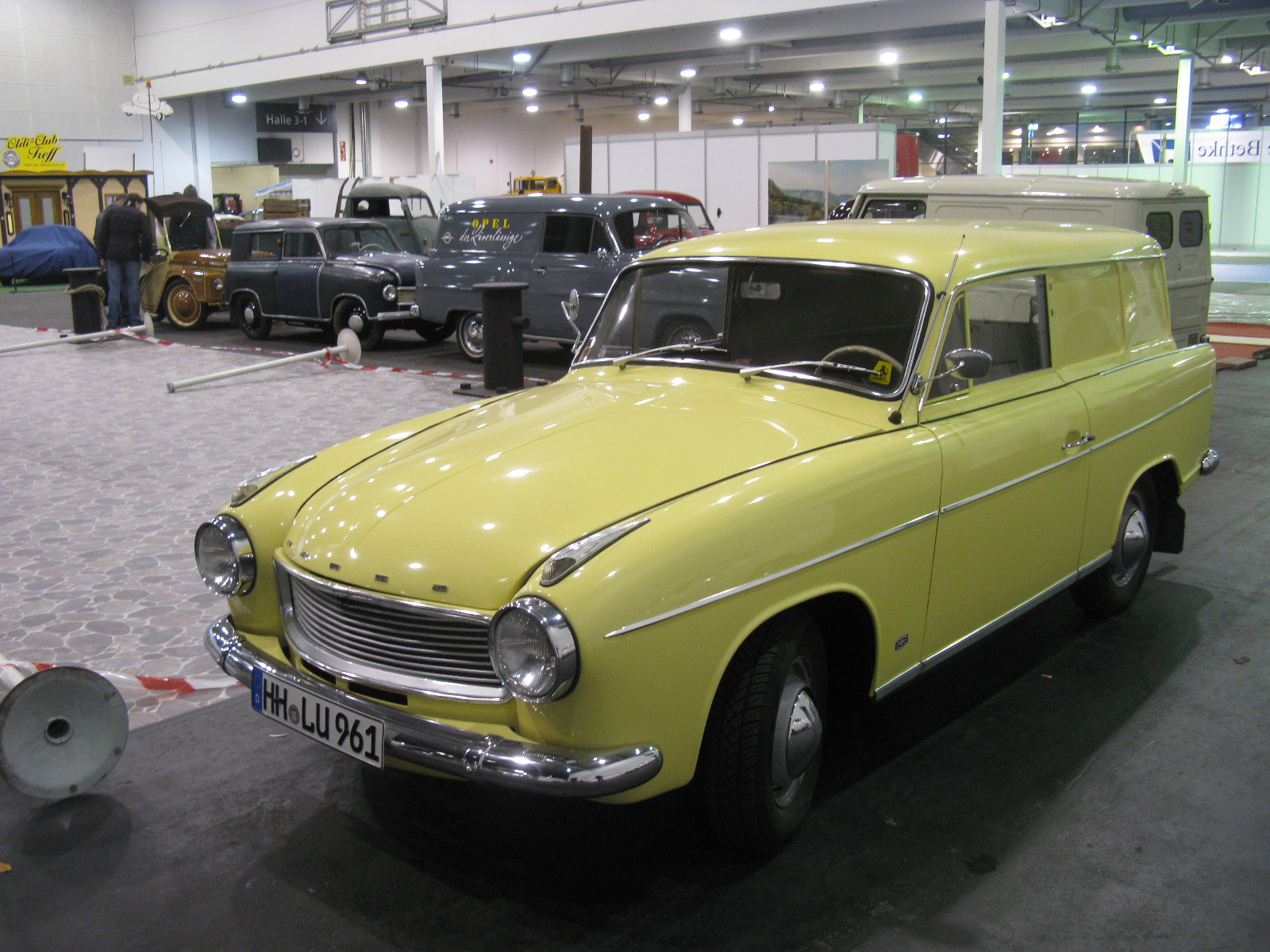
Hansa 1100 Combi (panel van)
