= Hansa (company) =

German automobile manufacturer

Hansa-Automobil
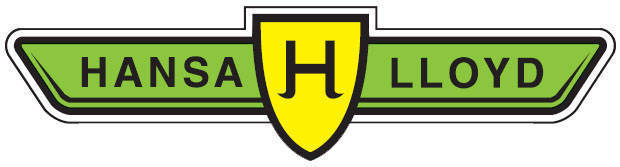
- Industry: Automotive
- Founded: 1904
- Defunct: 1931
- Fate: Takeover by Borgward
- Headquarters: Bremen, Germany
- Products: Automobiles
- Number of employees: 150 (1904)

Hansa-Automobil Gesellschaft m.b.H was a German car brand established in 1904, which in 1914 was merged with Norddeutsche Automobil und Motoren AG (NAMAG) into Hansa-Lloyd-Werke A.G.. From 1929 to 1931 it was taken over by the Borgward group. Hansa was based in the Bremen suburb of Hastedt.

== History ==
=== Founding ===
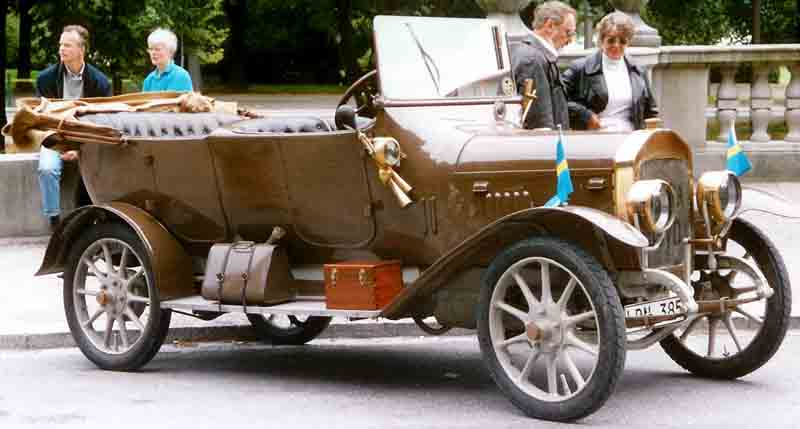
1914 Hansa-Lloyd type L 6/20 PS doppelphaeton

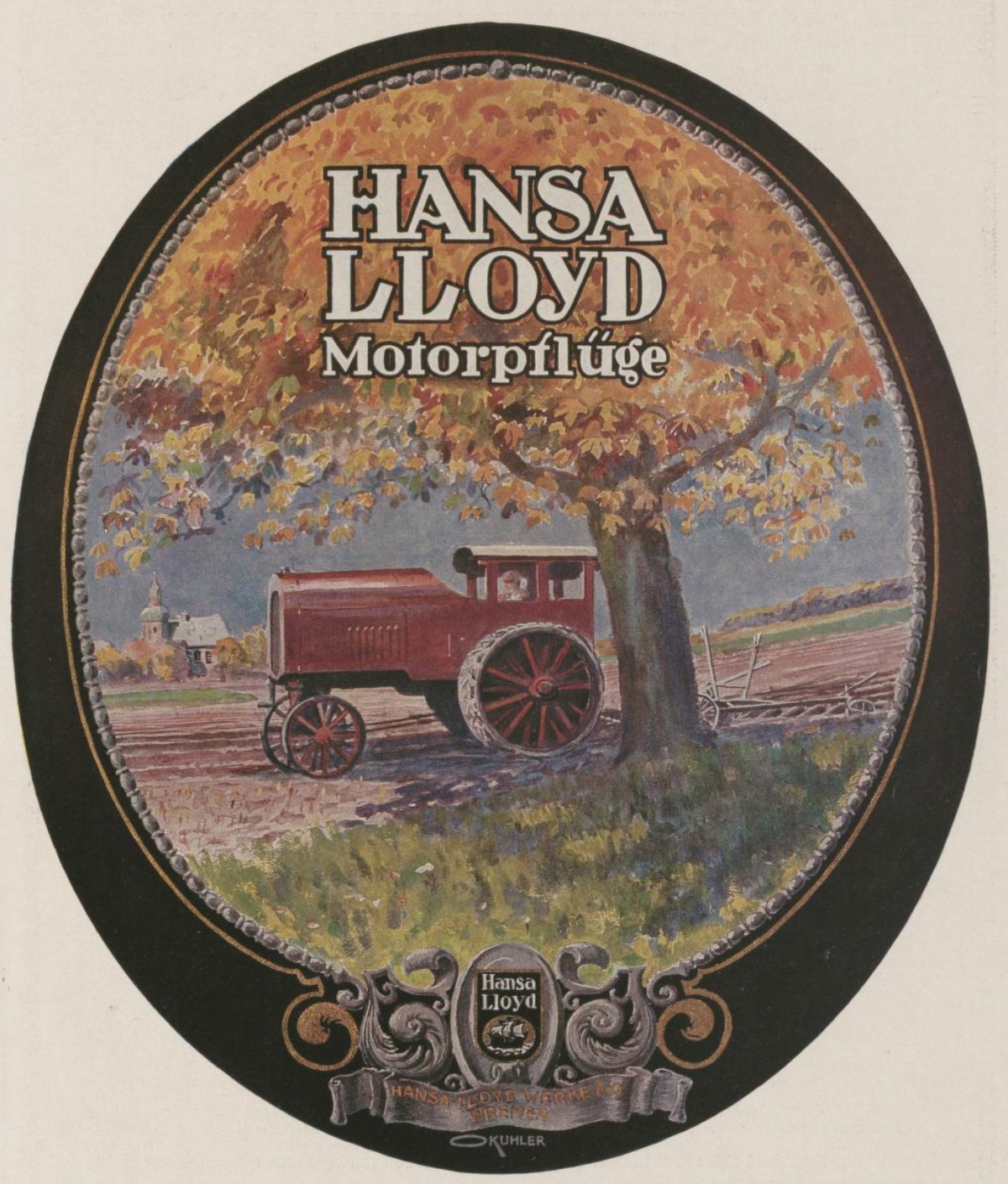
Hansa Lloyd tractor (1918)

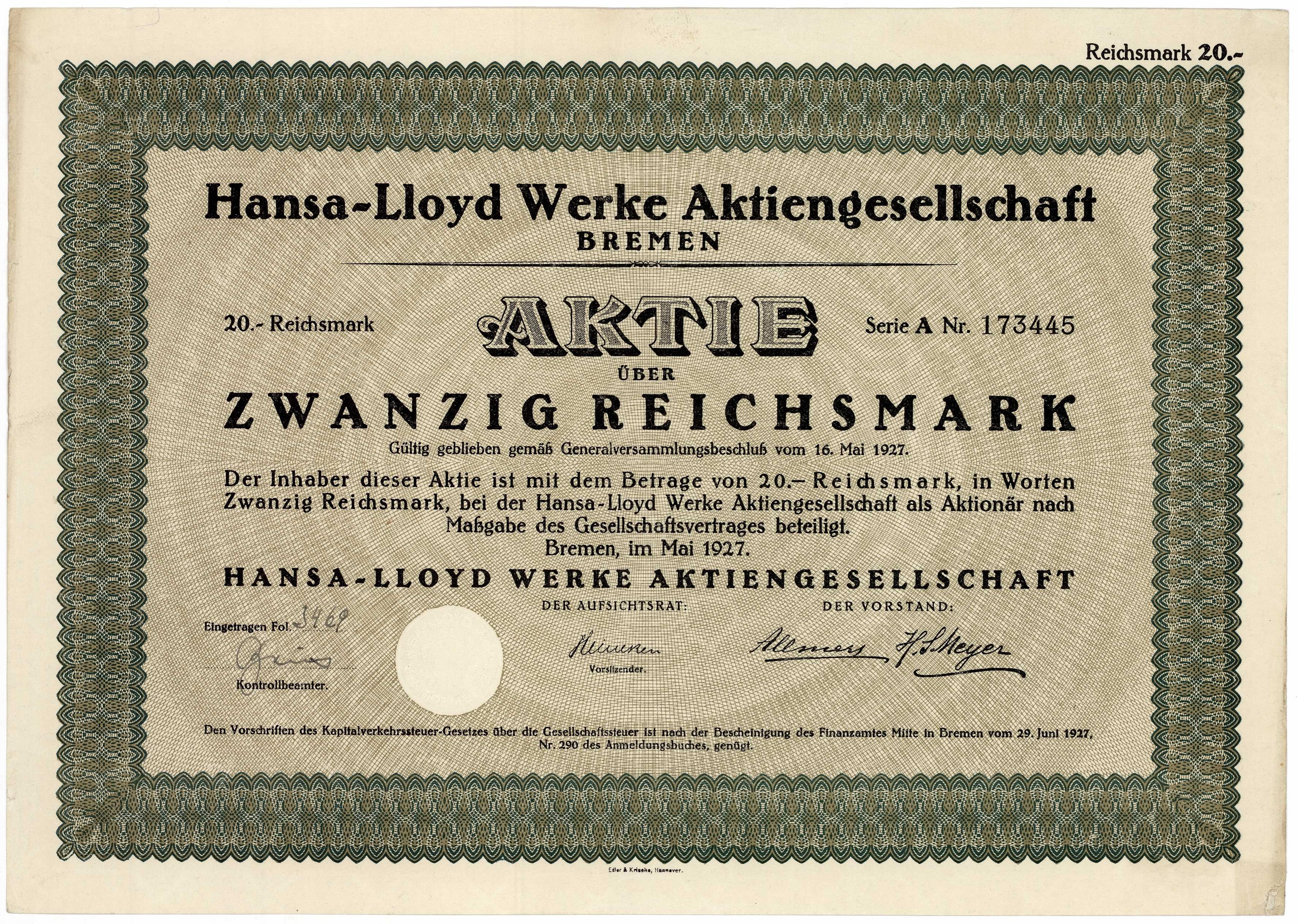
Share of the Hansa-Lloyd Werke AG, issued May 1927

The first cars were licence-built Kriéger electric vehicles, beginning in 1905. Petrol-engined models followed in 1908 with 3685 cc engines, but few were made. Belgian electrical engineer, Paul Mossay, was employed for four years as chief engineer, designing both engines and electric vehicles. In 1914 the company merged with Lloyd to become Hansa-Lloyd Werke AG. The company continued to change names and badging on a number of occasions and were never on a sound financial footing.

=== Interwar years ===
Most of the Hansa/Lloyd cars made during this period were sold as Hansa with the Hansa-Lloyd name mainly attached to commercial vehicles, with the exception of the Treff-Aß and the Trumpf-Aß. In 1929 the company was integrated in the Borgward group after the purchase of Hansa by Carl F. W. Borgward, and car production ceased.

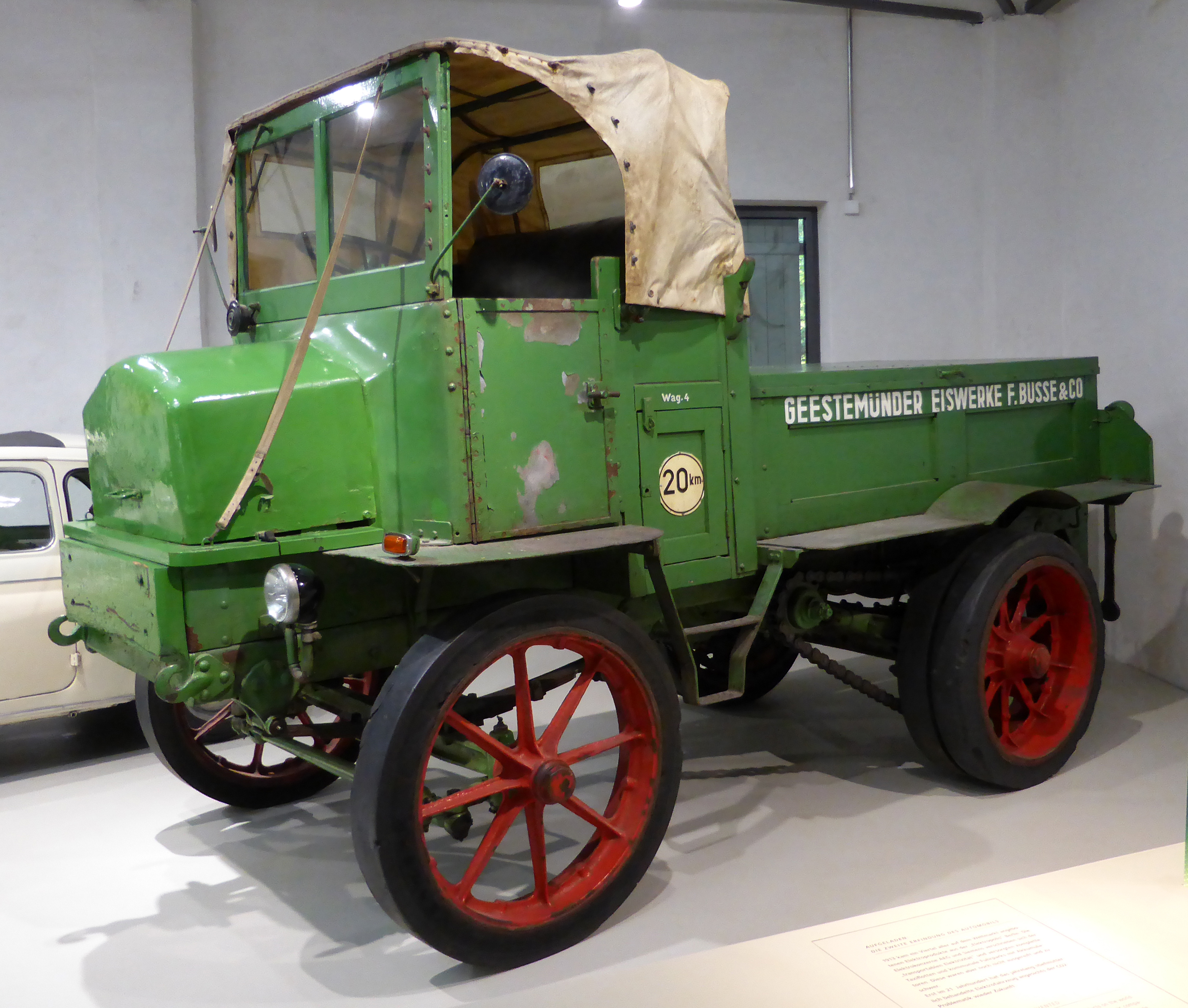
1935 Hansa-Lloyd DL 5 electric truck

Hansa-Automobilwerke founder Robert Allmers remained at the head of the company through the 1920s, as well as being the founder of the "Gemeinschaft der Deutschen Automobilfabriken" (Association of German Carmakers, GDA). GDA incorporated truck manufacturers N.A.G., Hansa-Lloyd, and lower-cost automobile manufacturer Brennabor (and later also Helios (automobile) and railroad car manufacturers Hawa) but were never able to successfully merge or streamline the operations of the various companies. When automobile production resumed after World War I, Hansa-Lloyd's sole model was the Treff-Aß (Ace of Clubs), a robust if somewhat outdated car based on pre-war designs. Its engine was a 4-litre four-cylinder producing 60 PS (44 kW). Allmers, however, was determined to manufacture a modern high-end automobile and in 1922 he ordered Hansa-Lloyd's engineers to develop an eight-cylinder car incorporating all of the latest technical developments. At the German Automobile Show in Berlin in the fall of 1923, the all new 16/80 with a 4.2-litre inline-eight was presented. For unknown reasons - although a series of strikes in 1924 may have had an impact - the car never entered series production, with the company enjoying steady sales of the sturdy old 18/60 and focusing on the development of an all-new light truck instead.

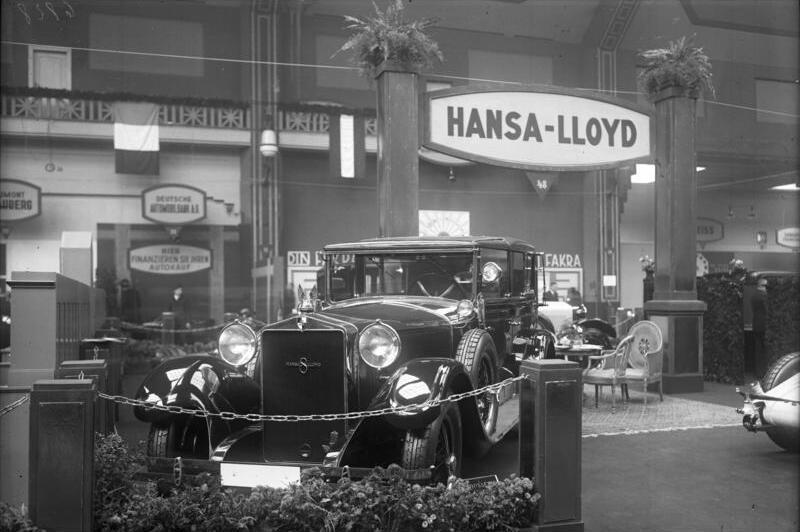
Hansa-Lloyd 20/100 Trumpf-Aß at the 1928 Berlin Motor Show

Allmers' dream of a luxury car had not abated, however, and in 1924 he hired an Italian engineer named Pellegretti away from Isotta-Fraschini. Pellegretti developed a new, more powerful and somewhat larger car which was introduced at the Berlin Show in 1925. The new 8-cylinder 4.6-litre Hansa-Lloyd 18/100 Trumpf-Aß (Ace of Trumps) produced 100 PS (74 kW) and sat on a 3,550 mm (140 in) wheelbase. The imposing new car was as good as anything else built in Germany at the time, but the development cost and minuscule production numbers helped lead to Allmers being gradually pushed out of the running of the company by the late 1920s. In spite of small sales, the Ace of Trumps saw continuous development during its production run: in 1927 or 1928 the engine was enlarged from 4,630 to 5,220 cc (283 to 319 cu in), the name accordingly changing to 20/100, while the wheelbase increased to 3,640 mm (143 in) in 1928 and to 3,750 mm (148 in) in 1929. After Borgward's takeover, eight-cylinder production ended in 1930 as the world entered the Great Depression. The Borgward group also included the Varel-produced Hansa A8 17/95PS eight-cylinder car, powered by an American-made Continental engine. The last 20/100 cars continued to be sold into 1931 as the "Hansa Imperator;" these were equipped with a bored out 5.8-litre engine.

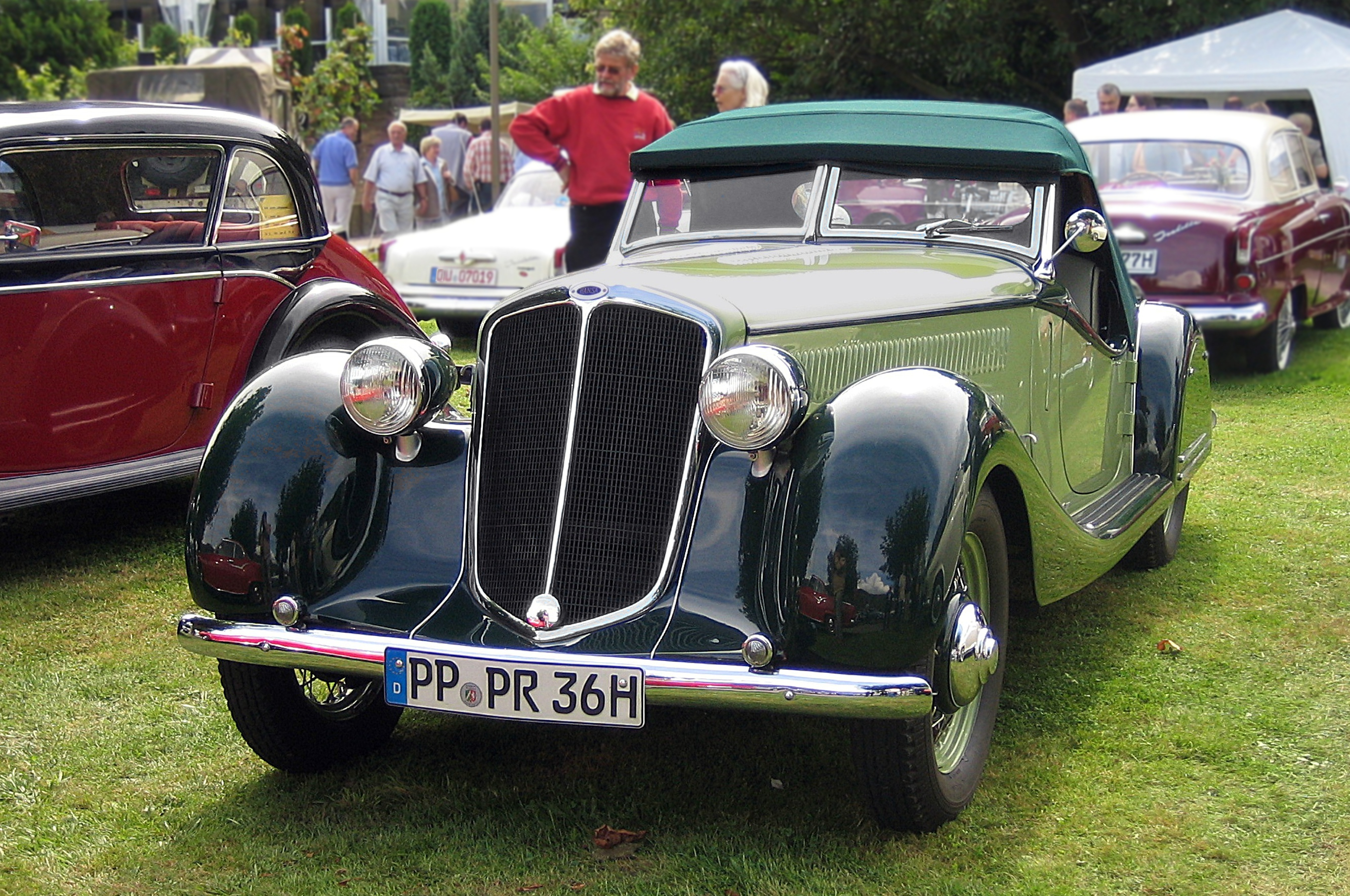
Hansa 1700 Sport

The Hansa-Lloyd factory was located opposite of Borgward's own Goliath factory on Föhrenstrasse in Bremen-Hastedt; the Hansa-Lloyd truck range complemented the Goliath range while the purchase also allowed Carl Borgward to fulfill his dream to produce his own cars. Carl Borgward stopped Hansa-Lloyd's production of luxury cars, but from 1933 onwards the brand name Hansa became the name of several Borgward passenger car models. The Hansa Konsul and Hansa Matador were introduced and shortly thereafter the small rear-engined Goliath Pionier-derived Hansa 400 and 500.

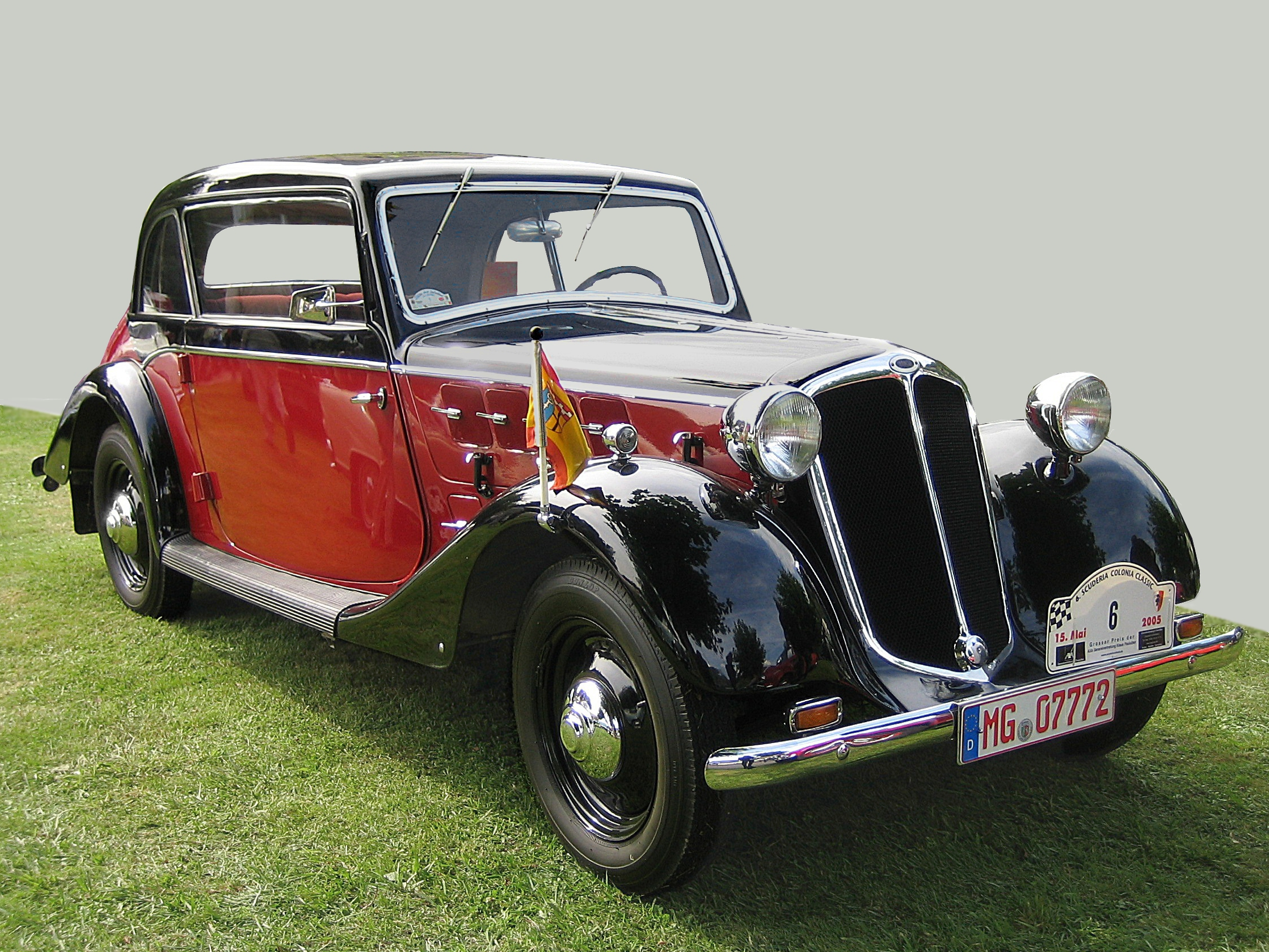
1937 Hansa 1100

In April 1933 the tax rules which had been favoring small cars such as the Hansa 400 were abolished; the slow selling smaller Hansas were discontinued soon thereafter. Borgward decided to instead produce the new Hansa 1100 four-cylinder two-door and four door all-steel Sedan, and then the six-cylinder 1700 and 2000. From 1939, the 2000 carried the Borgward brand. The name Hansa started to be phased out, becoming Hansa Borgward, then Borgward Hansa and finally Borgward.

Until 1937, the Hansa-Lloyd brand was used on a number of commercial vehicles (trucks and buses), from the one-ton "Express" to the five-ton "Merkur". These models were largely replaced by Borgward-branded vehicles, with a few models sold with just "Hansa" badging in 1938.

In the Second World War, the Bremen factory was completely destroyed.

=== Post war ===
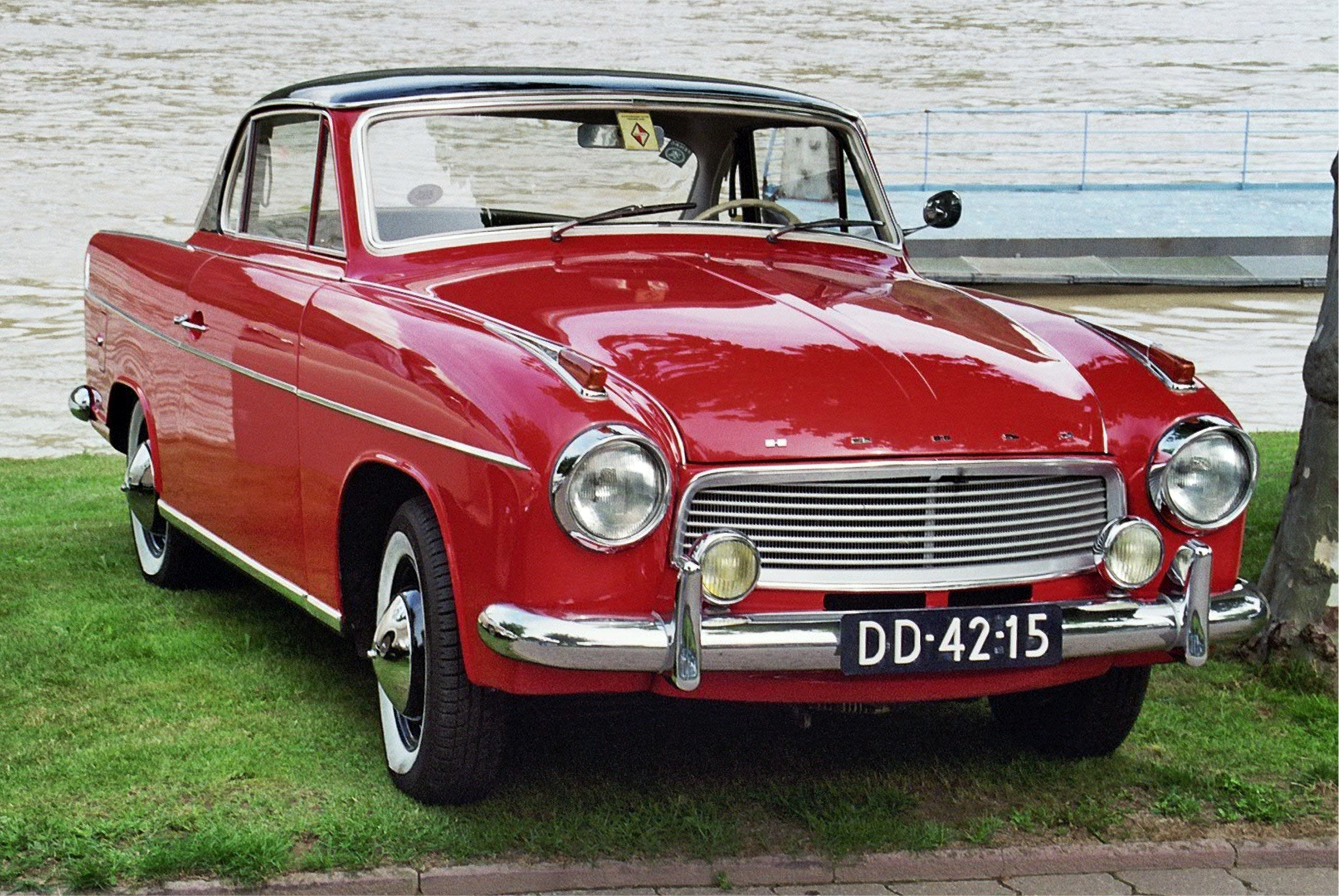
Hansa 1100 Coupe

The Borgward Hansa 1500, sold from 1949 onwards, was the first new car construction in Germany, followed by the Borgward Hansa 2400 large fastback sedan in 1952. From 1958, during the last three years of production, the former Goliath 1100 automobile were sold under the Hansa 1100 brand name until the Borgward group collapsed in 1961.
