= Goliath Pionier =

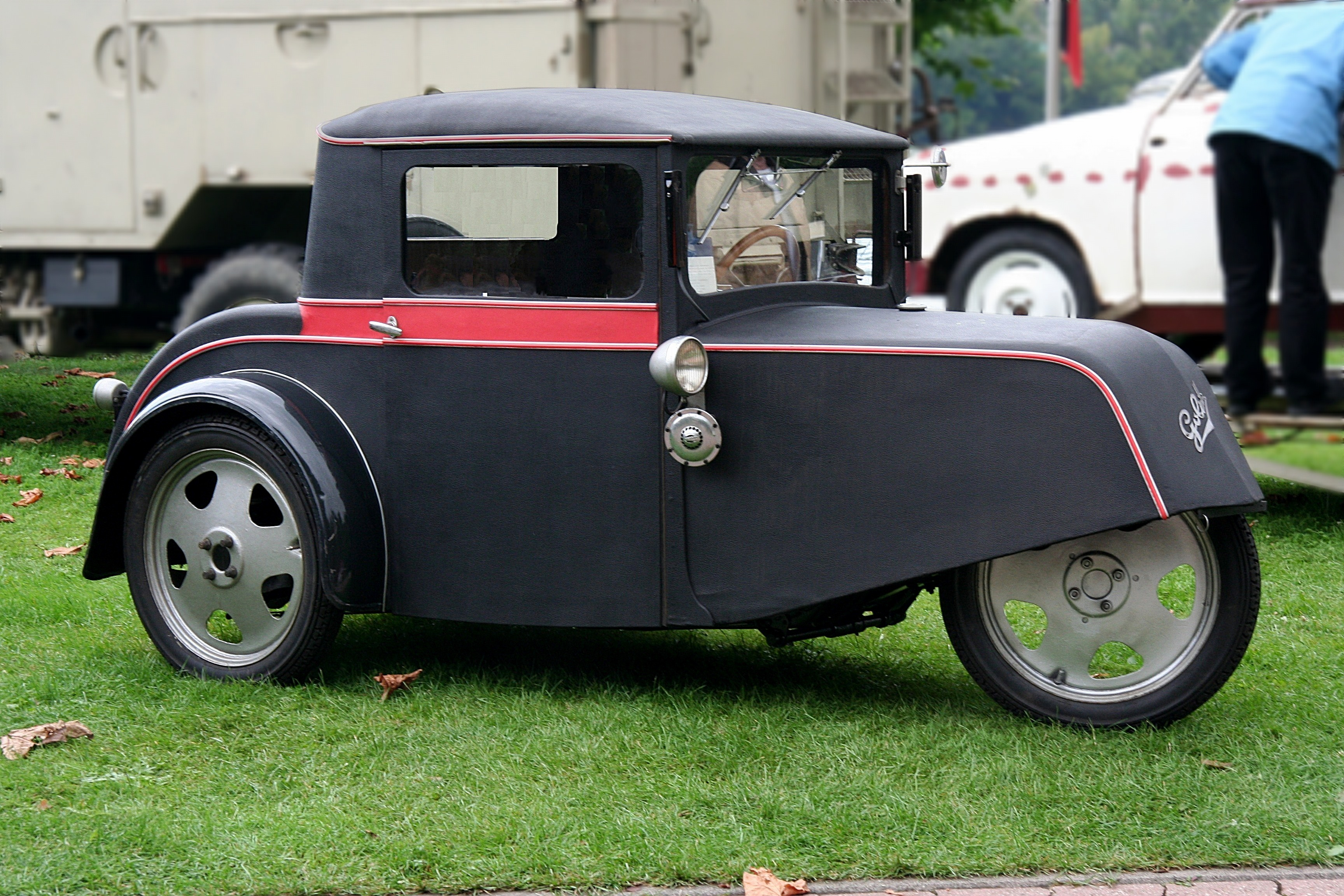

Overview
- Manufacturer: Goliath-Werke Borgward & Co.
- Production: 1931 – 1934; ~ 4,000 units

Body and chassis
- Body style: Microcar
- Layout: FR layout

Powertrain
- Engine: 198 cc single cylinder 2-stroke 247 cc single cylinder 2-stroke
- Transmission: 3-speed manual

Dimensions
- Wheelbase: 1,280 mm (50.4 in) (but with only one wheel at the front)
- Length: 3,100 mm (122.0 in)
- Width: 1,500 mm (59.1 in)
- Height: 1,400 mm (55.1 in)
- Curb weight: 350 kg (770 lb) (empty); 500 kg (1,100 lb) (loaded)

The Goliath Pionier is a small three-wheeled two-seater vehicle first presented by Carl F. W. Borgward at the 1931 Berlin motor show. It remained in production until 1934, by when approximately 4,000 had been produced.

== Origins ==
Borgward was an energetic entrepreneur-engineer whose first venture into motorised transport had involved using his refrigerator factory to manufacture the "Blitzkarren", a three-wheeled motorised vehicle first seen in 1924. Its success diverted Borgward into automobile production, and in 1928 he founded the "Goliath Werke Borgward & Co. GmbH". The 1931 launch of the Goliath Pionier was an evolution from the earlier design. In the decade following the First World War Germany experienced desperate poverty, and many micro-car designs were marketed, but the Pionier was both prettier and technically better thought through than competitors, and it enjoyed considerable success.

== The body ==
The Pionier was a three-wheeled two-seater, with its single wheel at the front. The vehicle was built around a timber frame, coated with a skin of synthetic leather fabric. In 1934 it acquired an elegant "streamlined" rear end, although only a few hundred of those cars were produced.

== Engine and transmission ==
There was a choice of single-cylinder two-stroke power units. Maximum claimed power output of the 198 cc unit was 5.5 PS (4 kW; 5 hp) at 3200 rpm, while the larger 247 cc unit produced 6.7 PS (5 kW; 7 hp). The gear box provided three forward speeds.

== Commercial ==
Mandatory driving licenses had been introduced in Germany in 1909, but light-weight three wheelers such as the Pionier could be driven without a driver's license. Annual car tax was payable by vehicle owners between 1906 and 1933, but the Pionier could be owned without inviting this tax burden. The practical vehicle captured the frugal spirit of the early 1930s and total sales of approximately 4,000 represented a useful proportion of the approximately 24,500 three-wheelers sold between 1931 and 1934. Nevertheless, after ten years of economic gloom, in 1933 economic recovery was already in sight, and government moves to stimulate the economy included the abolition of car tax. By 1934 the minimalist approach of the three-wheeled microcars was no longer favoured by the German car market. The company's next small car, the Hansa 400 built from September 1933, came with four wheels, a two-cylinder engine and at least 12 PS (9 kW; 12 hp) of claimed engine power.

In 1933 Borgward derived a commercial freight vehicle version of the Pionier and marketed is as the Goliath F400.
