= Standard E1 =

Motorized freight tricycle

Gutbrod Standard E1
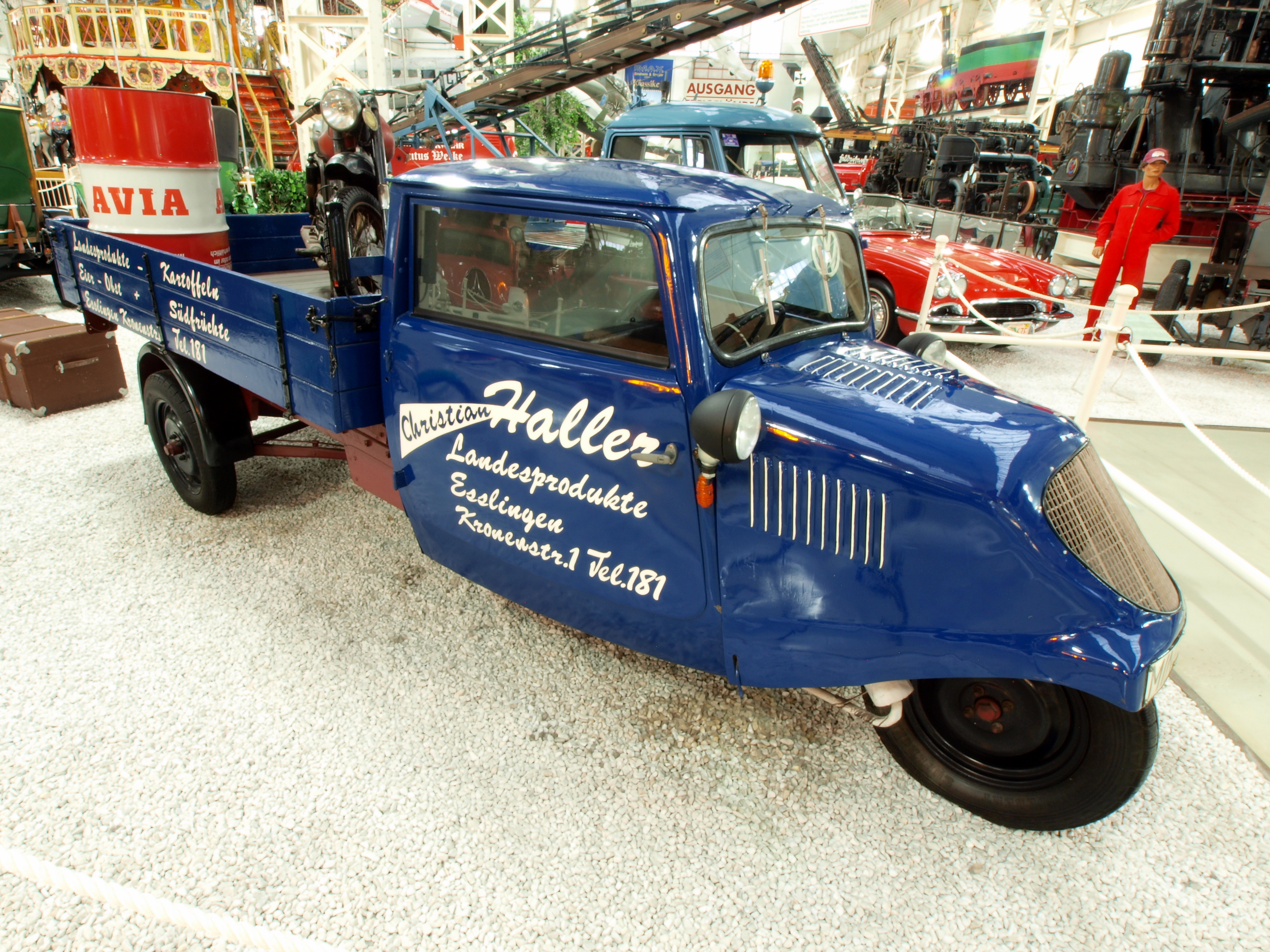
- Identical 1938 Tempo E 400 by Tempowerk Vidal & Sohn

Overview
- Manufacturer: Gutbrod, Standard Werkzeugfabrik, Germany
- Also called: Einheits-Dreirad-Lieferwagen
- Model years: 1939 - 1945

Body and chassis
- Body style: pickup truck,
- Layout: FF layout
- Platform: three-wheeler freight car

Powertrain
- Engine: two-stroke engine 400 CC
- Transmission: 3-speed gearbox

Chronology
- Predecessor: Standard P503
- Successor: Standard Heck P504

The Standard E1 was a motorized freight tricycle, produced from 1939 to 1945 by the Standard vehicle factory of Wilhelm Gutbrod, Germany. It was an identical construction of the Tempo E 400 by Tempowerk Vidal & Sohn, built from 1938 to 1948, the design was taken as Hitler's "Standard Three-wheeler Delivery Van" (Einheits-Dreirad-Lieferwagen). It had a simple chain drive from gearbox and engine to the front wheel below. This simple construction with a lifted center of gravity was less stable when cornering. So far former vehicle designs by Gutbrod had the engine and gearbox located behind the rear axle as an underfloor engine.

During World War II, manufacturers were obliged by the Nazi regime dictatorship to produce weapons and accessories as well as military equipment for the war. Only a few manufacturers were allowed to continue production of civil vehicles. It was the last freight tricycle built by Gutbrod. The coachbuilder Rometsch was forced to produce field kitchens, competitor Borgward produced military vehicles and least after the war the freight tricycle production was continued by its successor model.
