= Renault Estafette =

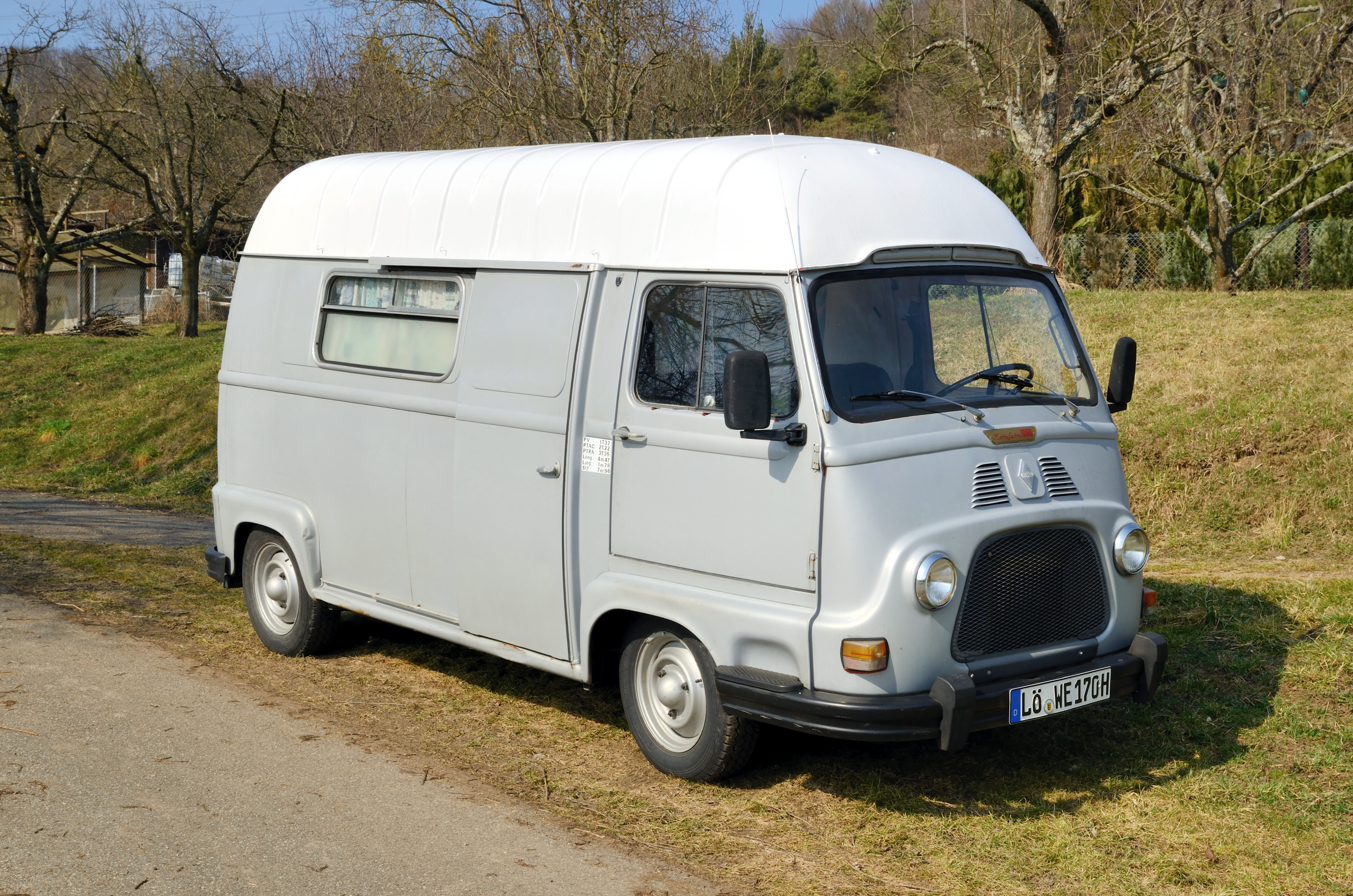

Overview
- Manufacturer: Renault
- Also called: Renault Hi-Boy (USA, Canada); Renault Petit-Panel (USA, Canada); Dacia D6 Estafette (Romania)
- Production: 1959–1980 (France); 1965–1969 (Algeria); 1975–1978 (Romania); 1964–1986 (Mexico)
- Assembly: France: Boulogne Billancourt, Paris; Algeria: Algiers (CARAL); Mexico: Ciudad Sahagún (DINA); Romania: Mioveni (Dacia)

Body and chassis
- Class: Light commercial vehicle (M)
- Body style: 4-door minibus 3-/4-door van 2-door pickup 2-door chassis cab
- Layout: Front-engine, front-wheel-drive
- Related: Sinpar Castor

Powertrain
- Engine: Petrol: 845 cc Billancourt I4; 1108 cc Cléon-Fonte I4; 1289 cc Cléon-Fonte I4
- Transmission: 4-speed manual

Dimensions
- Wheelbase: 2,270 mm (89.4 in); 2,650 mm (104.3 in) (LWB)
- Length: 4,070 mm (160.2 in)
- Width: 1,780 mm (70.1 in)
- Height: 1,930 mm (76.0 in)
- Curb weight: 975 kg (2,150 lb); 1,070 kg (2,359 lb) (Dacia D6)

Chronology
- Predecessor: Renault Colorale Fourgonette
- Successor: Renault Trafic

The Renault Estafette is a light commercial front-wheel drive van produced by the French automaker Renault. Initially used the water-cooled Renault Ventoux engine, then later the Cléon-Fonte engine in a range of body styles. It was replaced by the Renault Trafic.

Following the launch of the Estafette, Renault became the only auto-maker in the world to simultaneously produce and sell vehicles with all three of the drive train configurations commonly used, with the front engined front wheel drive Estafette, along with various rear engined rear wheel drive cars such as the Dauphine and the front engined rear wheel drive Frégate and the ageing Dauphinoise.

== History ==
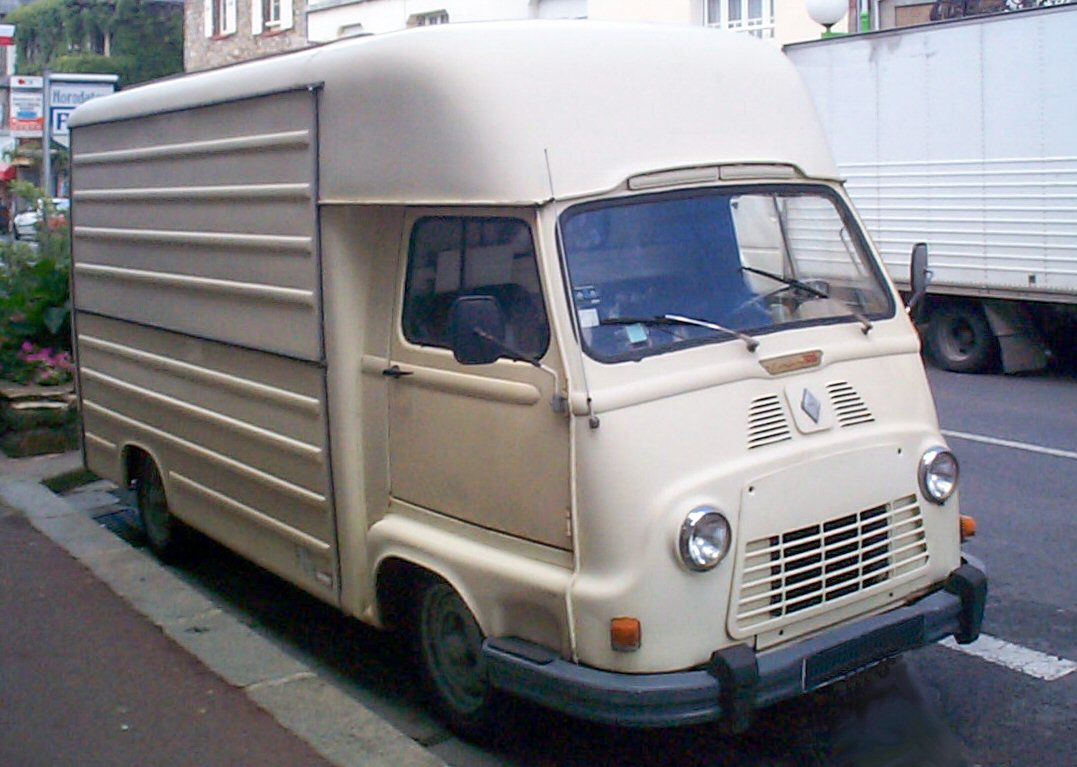
Renault Estafette fitted with tall box body

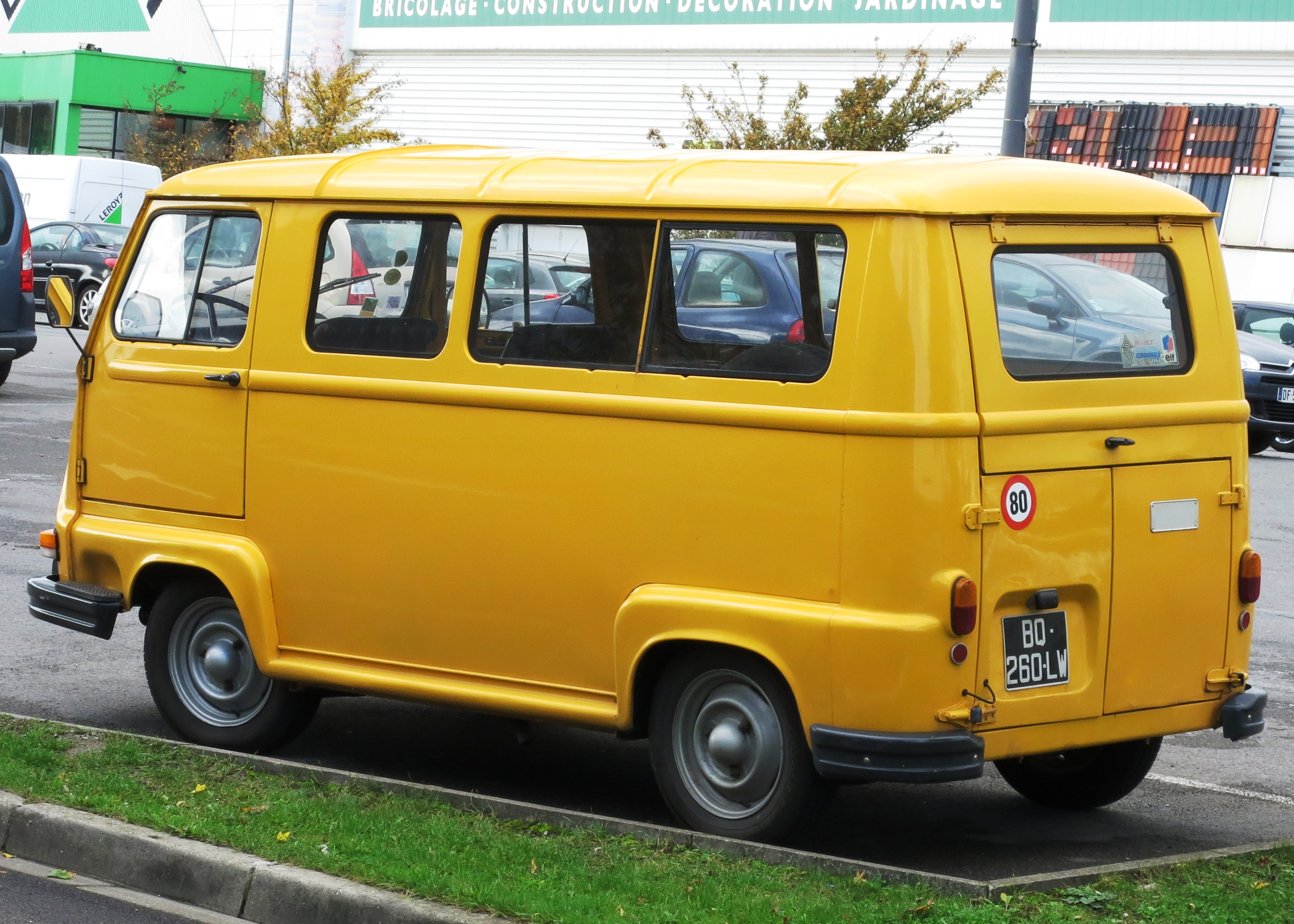
Renault Alouette, pictured from an angle that highlights the three-part rear door arrangement that was a feature of the design

In the summer of 1944 the French Ministry of Industrial Production set out a prescriptive plan to make the most of scarce resources for the post war motor industry. It was headed by Paul-Marie Pons and so it was known as the Plan Pons. Under the Plan Pons, Peugeot, Renault and Chenard & Walcker were restricted to making vans for 1000–1400 kg while Citroën was to make small trucks for 2 and 3.5 tonnes.

However, Pierre-Jules Boulanger at Citroën ignored the Plan Pons and went ahead with the design of the Citroën H Van, which launched in 1947. This unitary body with no separate frame design, with four-wheel independent suspension, and front-wheel drive, offered a powerful motor, capacity, and an exceptionally low loading floor. It was an immediate success, and continued in production to 1981.

Renault obeyed the Plan Pons instructions and designed the 206 E1 following general pre-war design ideas. It had a fixed chassis onto which the van body was bolted and the body was made by fitting metal panels to a wooden frame. This old-fashioned method paid off in terms of the time it took to build and overall production costs, because at the time stamped body panels were relatively expensive and it also saved weight. In this period of material shortages Renault did the best they could and the 1000 kg as it became known was a success, but not on the scale of Citroën's H Series that was selling to small businesses such as shop keepers and tradesmen. It was for this reason that Renault decided to fill the gap between the 300 kg Renault Juvaquatre and the 1000 kg 206 E1. This position was previously held by the Renault Colorale van that had ended production in 1957, and left for 2 years without a successor, until the Estafette came over.

It was clear that they needed a front-wheel-drive van, but the company had just signed up to a policy of rear-engined, rear-drive models with the 4cv and the Dauphine, then under development for 1957. The only example of a rear-engined van was the Volkswagen Type 2, and it did not offer load-space or a low floor to rival the Citroën. Reluctantly Fernand Picard, the designer of the 4cv, agreed to give the go-ahead to the team headed by Guy Grosset-Grange to try something new. As a question of production logic, they had to use existing Renault parts, and that meant the new engine being developed for the Dauphine, but adapting it for a front drive van was not simply a matter of moving it and turning it around, and therefore they had to match it to a new gearbox, which gave them the opportunity to choose gear ratios to suit the van's needs.

They also worried if the 845 cc engine would cope with a 600 kg payload, and they doubted it would have enough power or durability, until they heard of the German Gutbrod Atlas that was carrying 1000 kg using a tiny 622 cc engine. They brought one to France, and used it as a test bed for the 845 cc engine and were soon satisfied that it would work well. And so began over 2 million kilometres of testing.

Launched in June 1959, the new van was to be called the Estafette from the Italian Staffetta, meaning Courier. At launch, the engine, although mounted near the front of the Estafette, was of the same size and output as that fitted to the recently introduced Renault Dauphine. The Estafette's emphasis was always on economy and practicality rather than on power or heavy-duty performance.

It was introduced in four body types; the normal van with the rear door in three sections, in a variation on the stable door style. The upper part with the window hinged upwards, while the lower part was divided into two halves, opening to the left and to the right. A sliding door on the pavement side of the load space was also normally fitted, as was a sliding driver's door. There was a high roof version with translucent plastic roof that on its lower part was left unpainted and the top was normally white (though later models could be fully painted). The pickup version had a tubular frame to support the canopy which could easily be pushed forward and stored behind the cab which was closed off. The tailgate of this model could be used as a convenient loading ramp or be removed altogether. A minibus was also introduced seating eight passengers and the driver. Originally the Estafette was available only in four colours from the factory; grey, blue, yellow or orange.

The Estafette gave all it had promised, with its low floor and wide rear opening; the high roofed version were especially popular with companies having to load bulky items because although the 0.8-cubic-metre (28 cu ft) increase in capacity didn't sound like a lot, the additional height did allow a man to stand inside to help load. And it was very popular as a mobile shop, which at markets became as typically French as the ice cream van is English.

=== Evolution ===
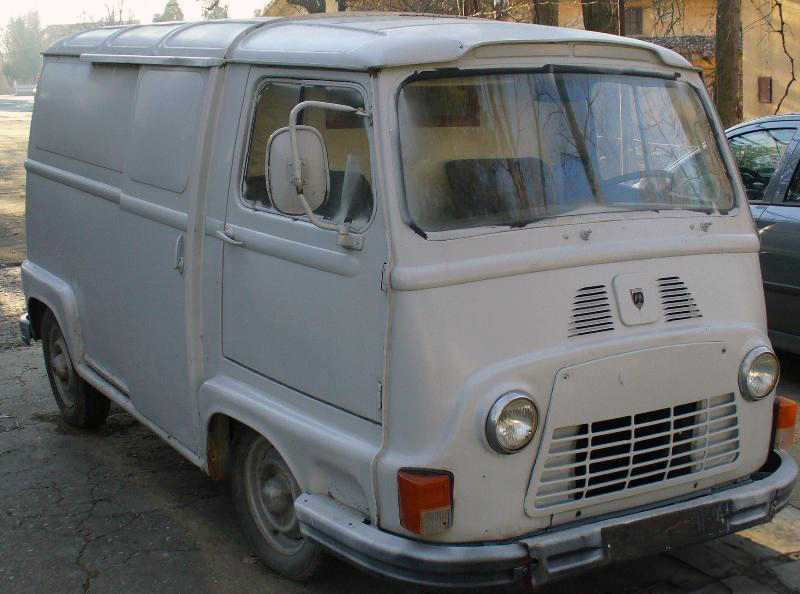
Dacia Estafette, built in Romania

In 1961 came the Alouette version which was a simpler version of the minibus with removable seats that could convert it into a camper van and was indeed popular with French conversion companies. Finally a chassis-cab version was introduced onto which innumerable bodies could be fitted.

In May 1962 the 800 kg (1,764 lb) rated Estafette was the first vehicle to receive Renault's newly developed "Sierra" series water-cooled four-cylinder 1,108 cc five-bearing engine, which was destined to appear in a passenger car a month later with the launch, in June 1962, of the Renault 8.

In 1968 a series of 70 vans were issued to the police at the Winter Olympics held in Grenoble, and this led to a long-term contract, but Renault's biggest customer for the Estafette was PTT, the French telephone company. In 1968 it gained the 1,289 cc engine developed for the not-yet released Renault 12 to give a full 1000 kg capacity. In 1973 the grille was updated, with a plainer modern look. The Estafette continued in production until 1980 when it was replaced by the Trafic, having sold over 500,000 units.

In Romania, a version of the Estafette was produced for the Romanian Post between 1975 and 1978, by Automobile Dacia, in only 642 units (842 by other sources).

=== Revival ===
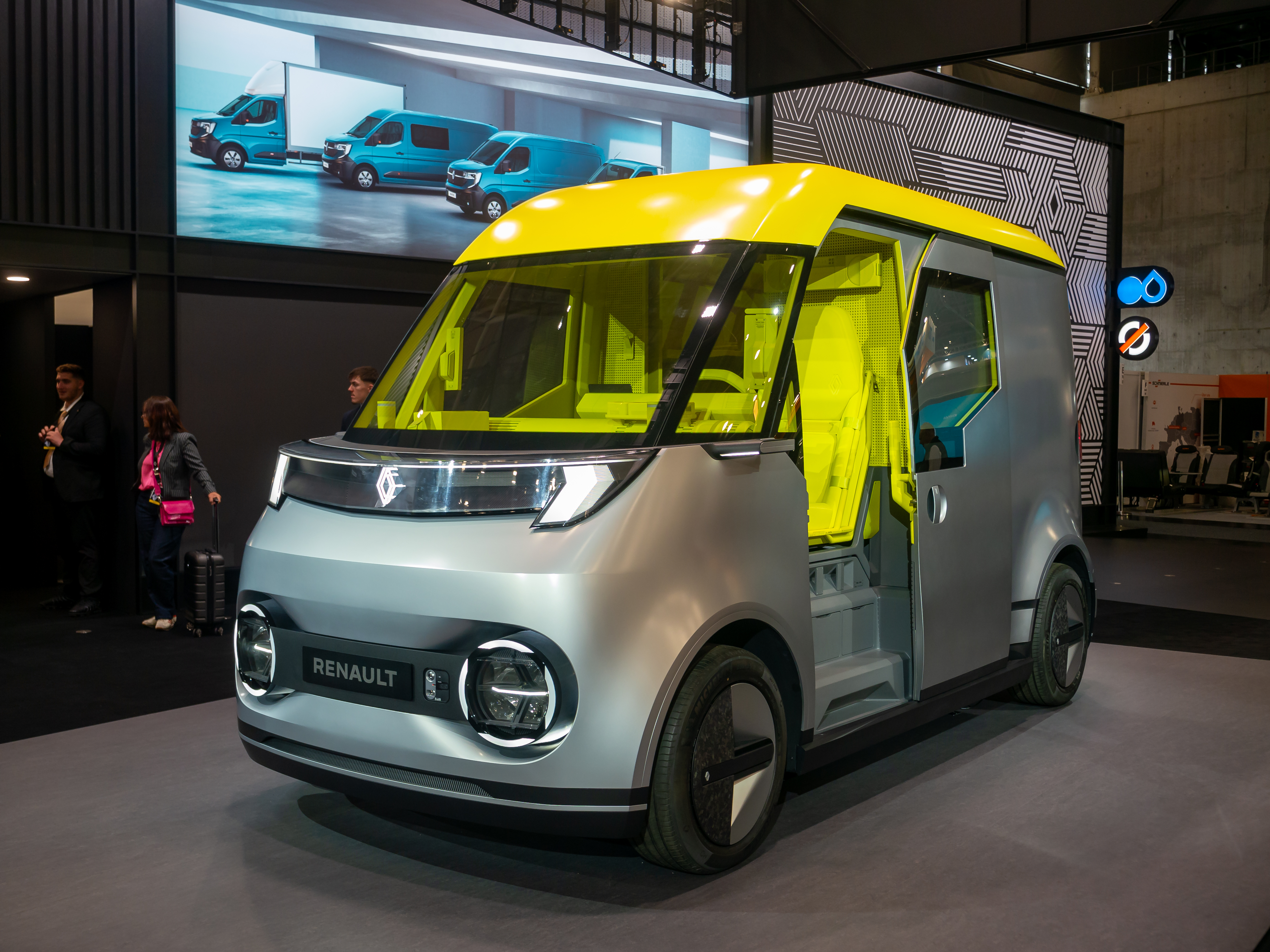
Renault Estafette Concept at the 2024 IAA Show

At the 2024 IAA Show in Hanover, Renault revealed the Estafette concept. Created under the new Flexis Group (a partnership between Renault and Volvo Trucks), the Estafette is the first vehicle to use the company's newly developed 'FlexEVan' platform, which enters production in two years time.

The new Estafette will serve as a replacement for the Trafic and, according to Flexis CEO Philippe Divry, will serve "as the first example of what electric utility vehicles will look like tomorrow".

== Versions ==
- R2130/31
  - in production: May 1959 – May 1962
  - engine: 845 cc, 32 PS (24 kW), type 670
  - payload: 500–600 kg (1,102–1,323 lb)
- R2132/33/34/35
  - in production: May 1962 – Nov 1968
  - engine: 1,108 cc, 45 PS (33 kW), type 688
  - payload: 800 kg (1,764 lb), 1,000 kg (2,205 lb) for "Estafette 1000"
- R2136/37 (2137 being the "Plateau" and "Base Carrossable" open bed pickups)
  - in production: Sep 1968 – Jun 1980
  - engine: 1,289 cc, 54 PS (40 kW), type 810
  - payload: 800 kg (1,764 lb) for R2136, 1,000 kg (2,205 lb) for R2137

== Gallery ==
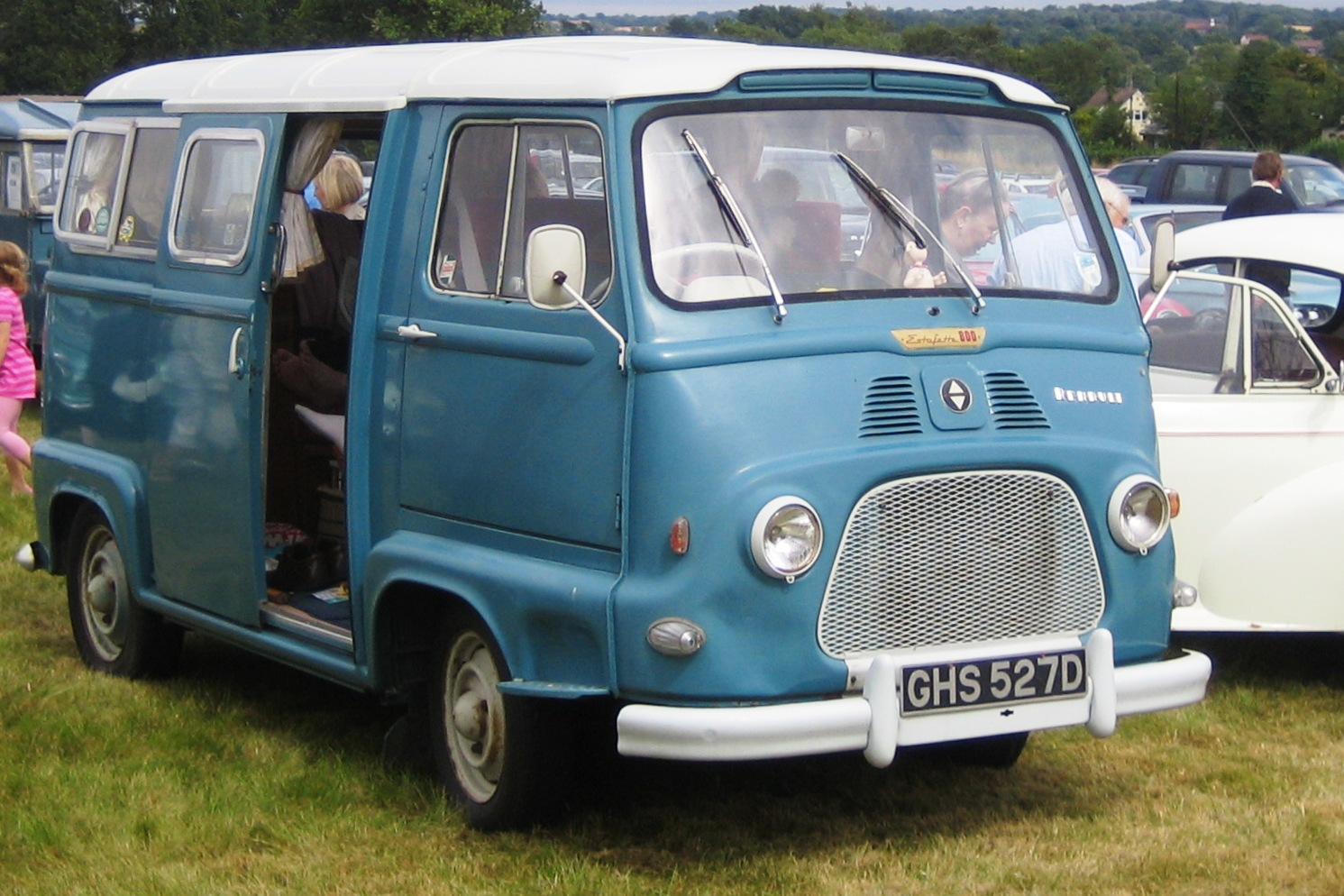
Estafette 800, pre-facelift RHD

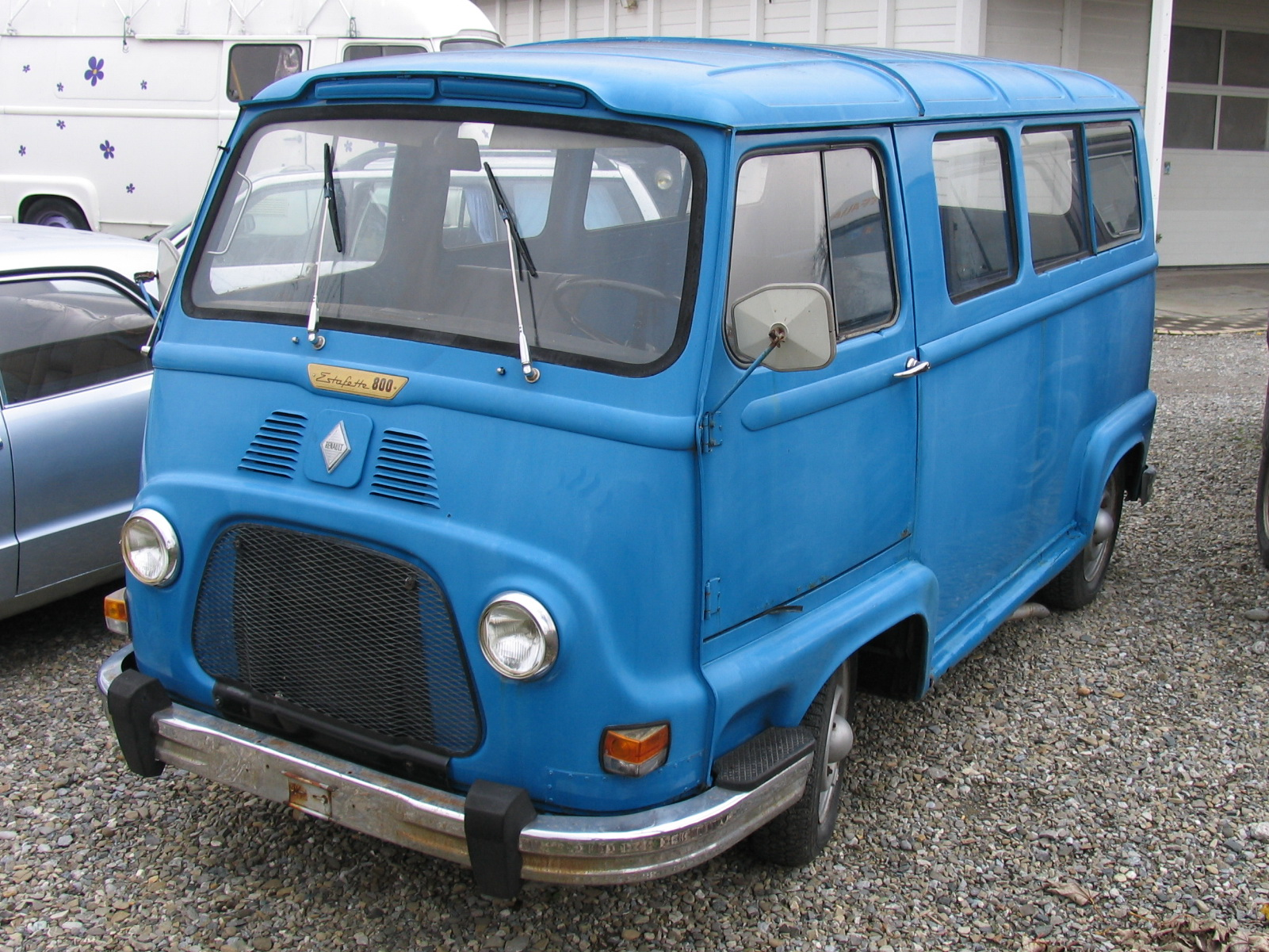
Estafette 800

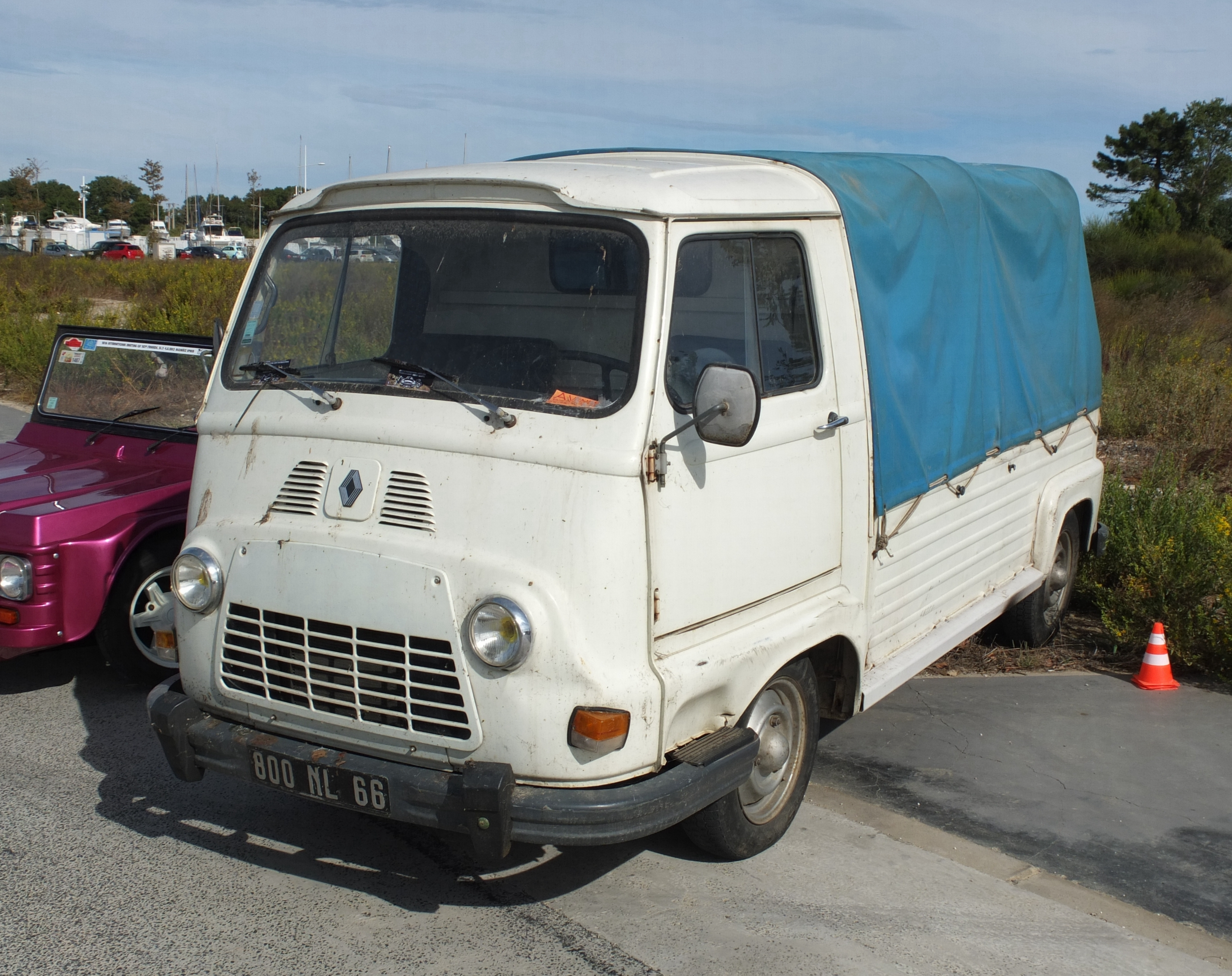
Pickup version

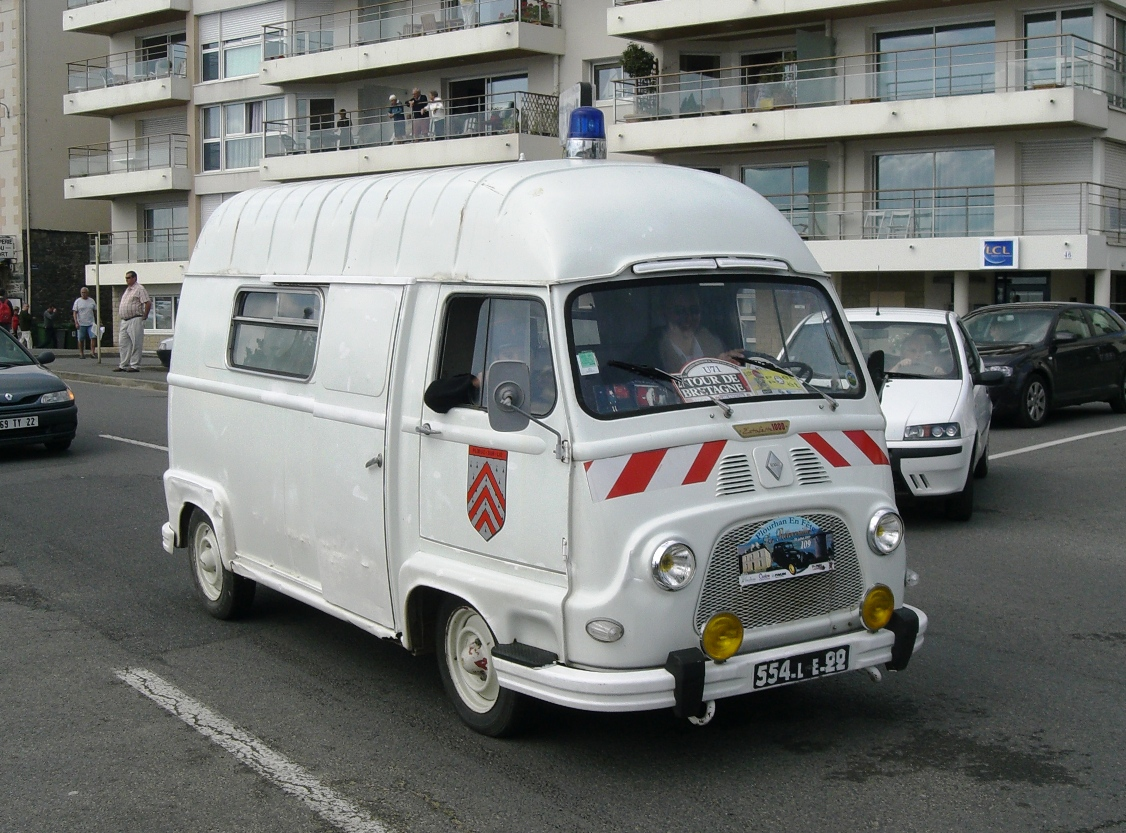
1965–1968 Estafette 1000, with longer wheelbase

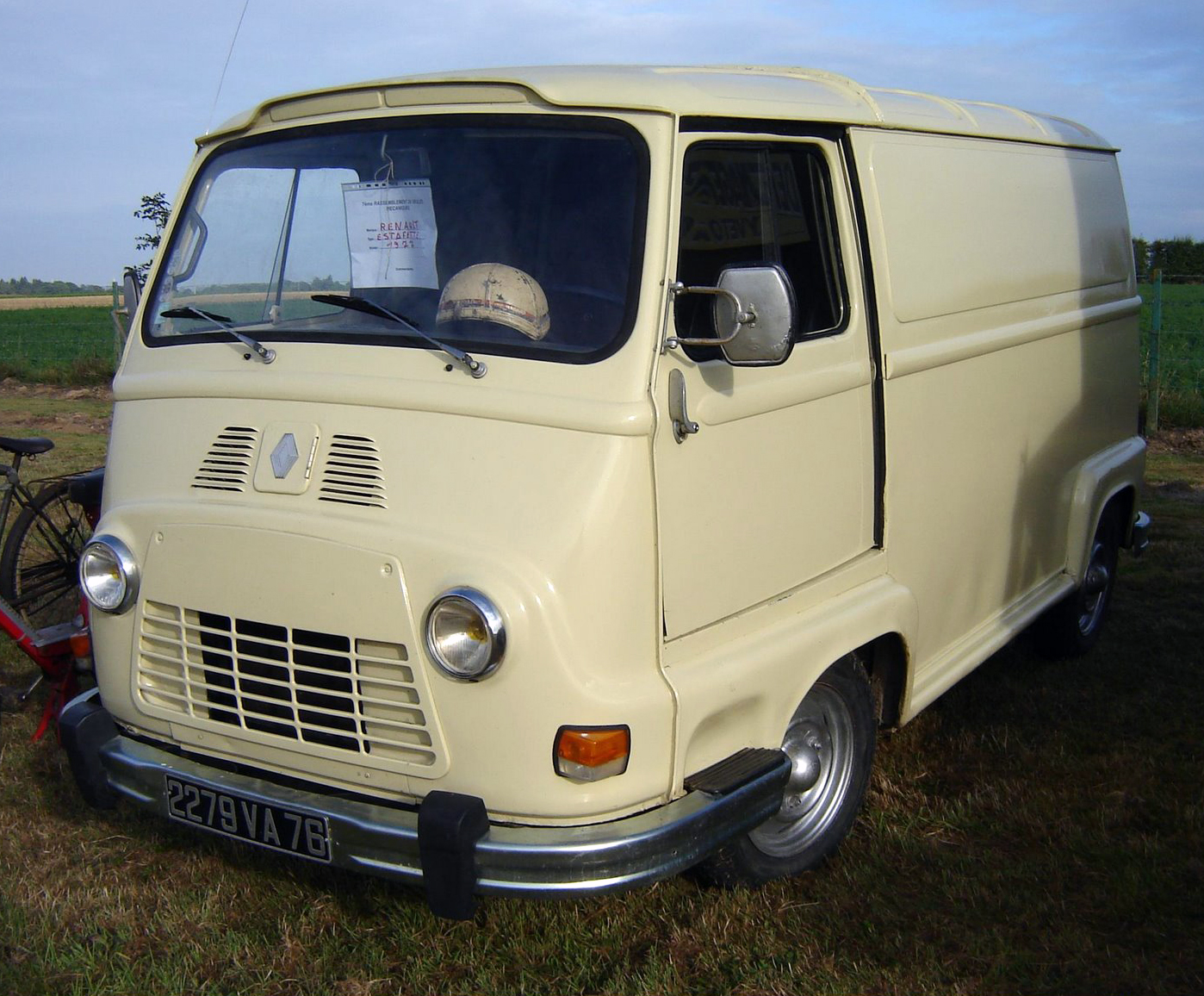
1977 Estafette

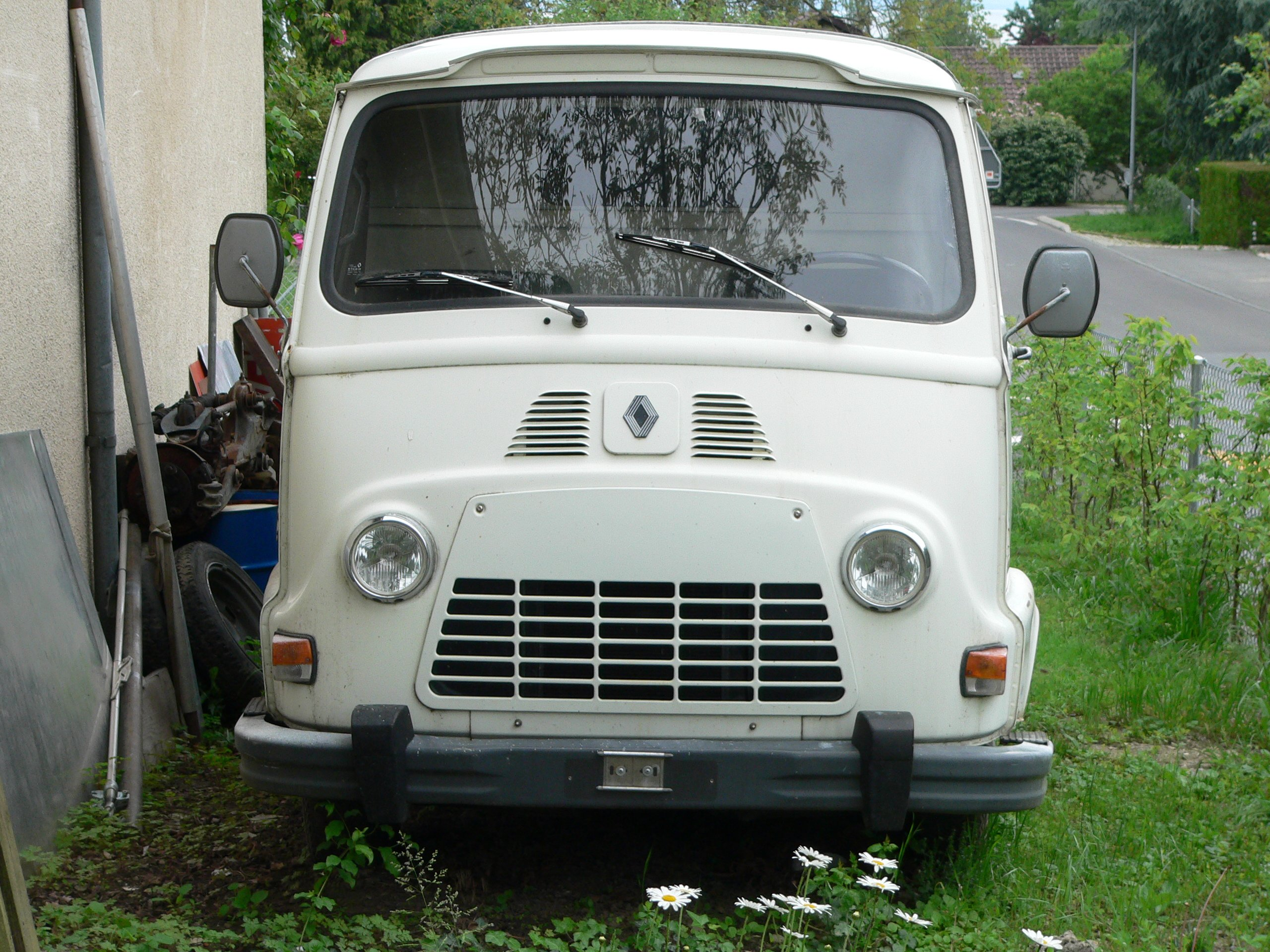
Renault Estafette Plateau with canvas top, ca. 1976

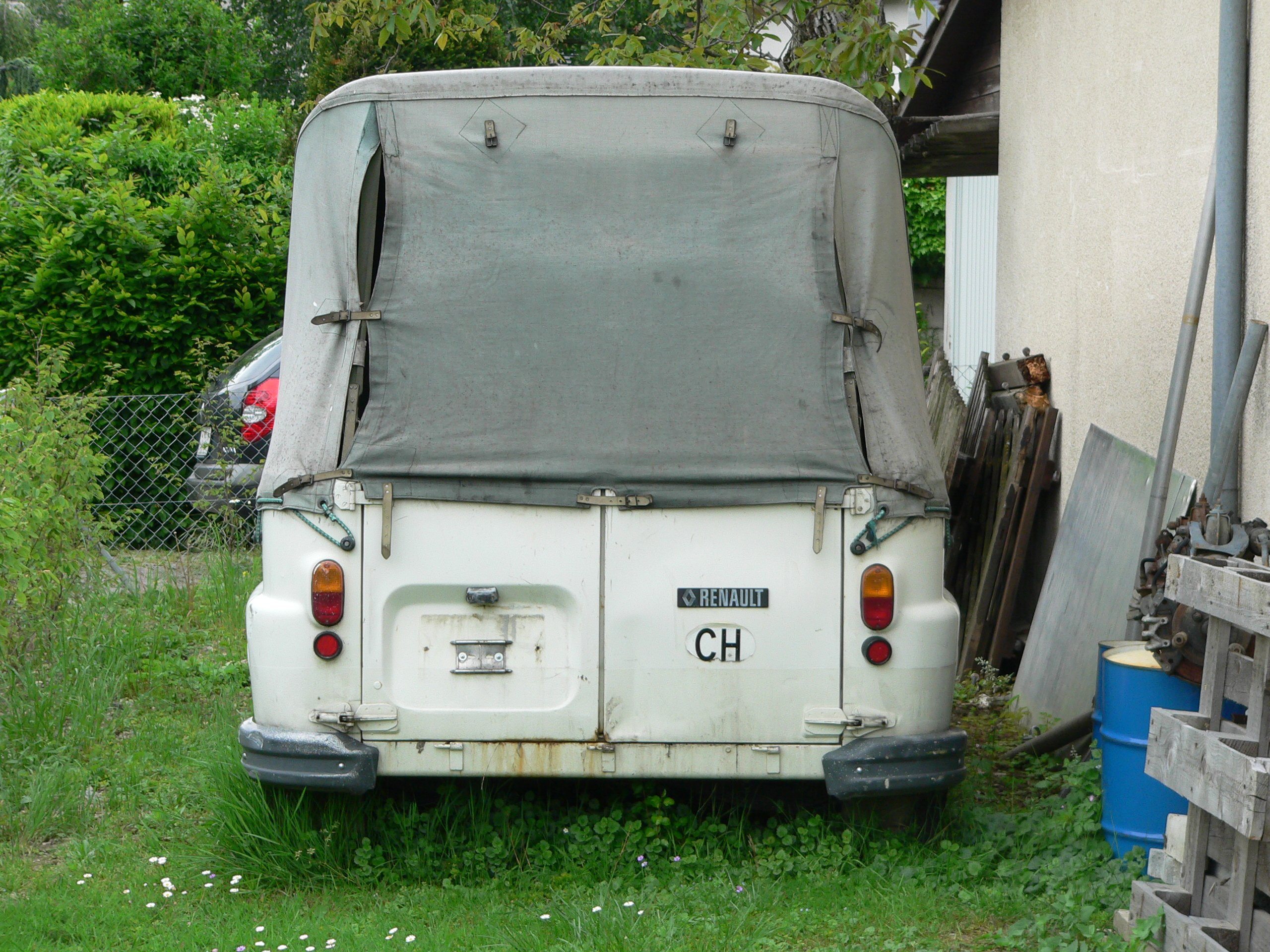
Back still features standard split lower rear door.

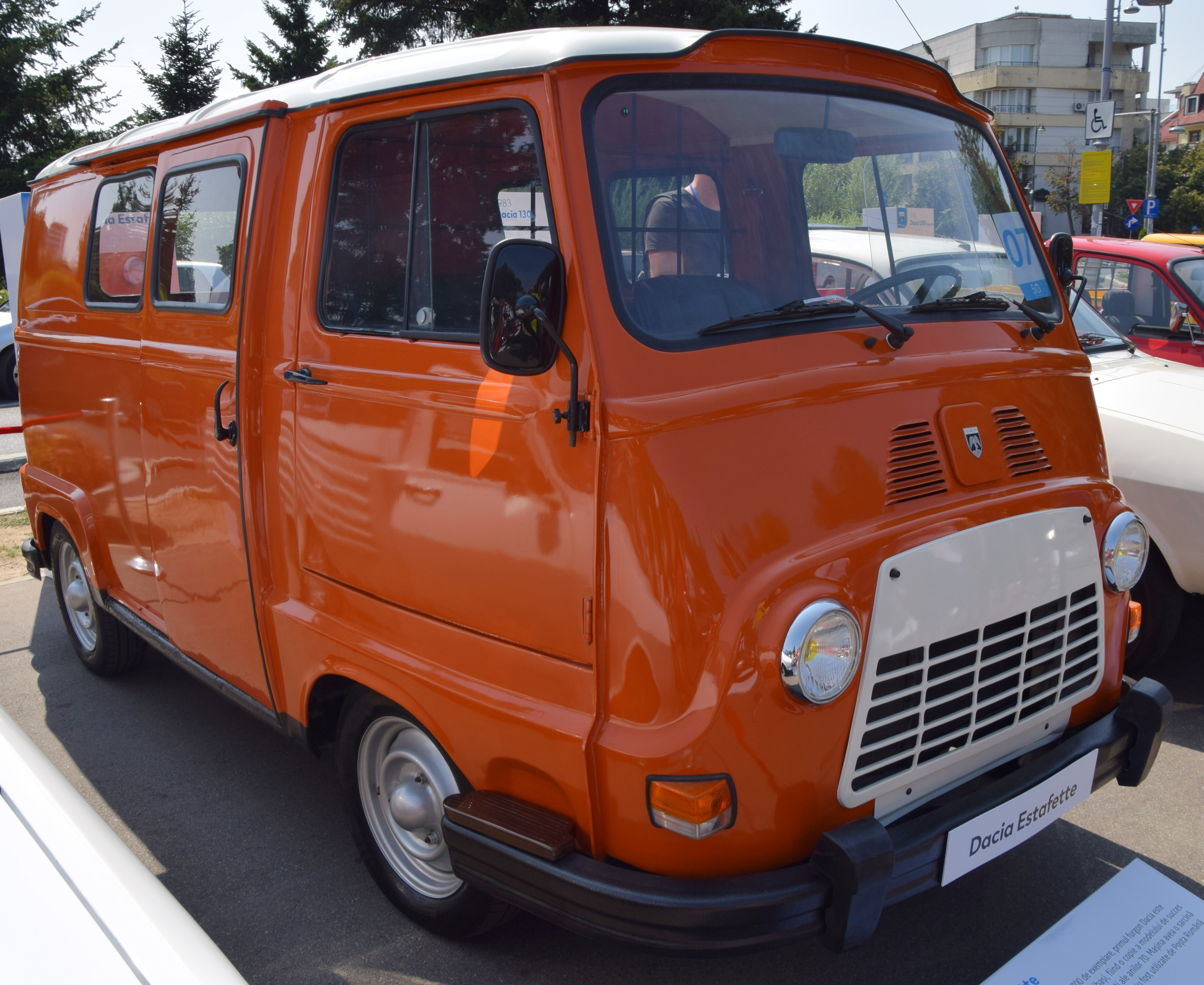
Dacia D6 Estafette
