= Standard P503 =

Gutbrod Standard P503

Overview
- Manufacturer: Gutbrod, Standard Werkzeugfabrik, Germany
- Model years: 1935–1939

Body and chassis
- Body style: pickup truck, panel van
- Layout: RR layout
- Platform: three-wheeler freight car
- Related: P504

Powertrain
- Engine: two-stroke engine
- Transmission: 3-speed gearbox

Chronology
- Predecessor: Gutbrod Progress
- Successor: Gutbrod E1 (1939–1945)

The Standard P503 was a three-wheeler light freight truck, produced from 1935 to 1939 by Wilhelm Gutbrods Standard Werkzeugfabrik, (Standard tooling company) Germany.

The reason to offer the same model P203 with the downsized 200 cc engine was to meet the legal permit of license free drivers and the vehicles exception from tax that time. Competitors also offered 200 cc engine version of their vehicles.

The four wheel variant was the "Standard P504", also a 200 cc engined version was marketed as "Standard P204".

Unique under the competitors the four variants of "Eillieferwagen" (express delivery vehicle) had the rear under floor or flatbed placed two stroke engine, 200 cc as single cylinder or a 500 cc two cylinder boxer-engine.

Vehicle variations with the 500 cc allowed for a payload of 0,75 metric tons, and variations with the 200 cc engine 0,5 metric tons.

After World War II, only competitors continued their three-wheeler production, while the four-wheeler successors "Heck 504" and "Heck 604" where in production from later 1946 till 1949 and early 1950 and superseded by the Gutbrod Atlas.

Prices were from RM 1395 for the small engine flatbed to RM 2045 for the ambulance panel van with big engine.

== Competitors ==
- Tempo D200 and D400, later E200 and E400, a very similar three-wheel freight cart, except its front wheel drive had the engine on top the front wheel, which affected the vehicles balance
- Framo LH200 and LH300, similar front wheel drive
- Goliath F200 and F400, later Goliath/Borgward FW200 and FW400, a very similar three-wheel freight cart, with engine under the seat
- Piaggio Ape, with production started over a decade later in 1948, but is still on the market
- The Borgward brand Goliath resumed three-wheeler production in 1949
