= Gutbrod =

Former automobile manufacturer

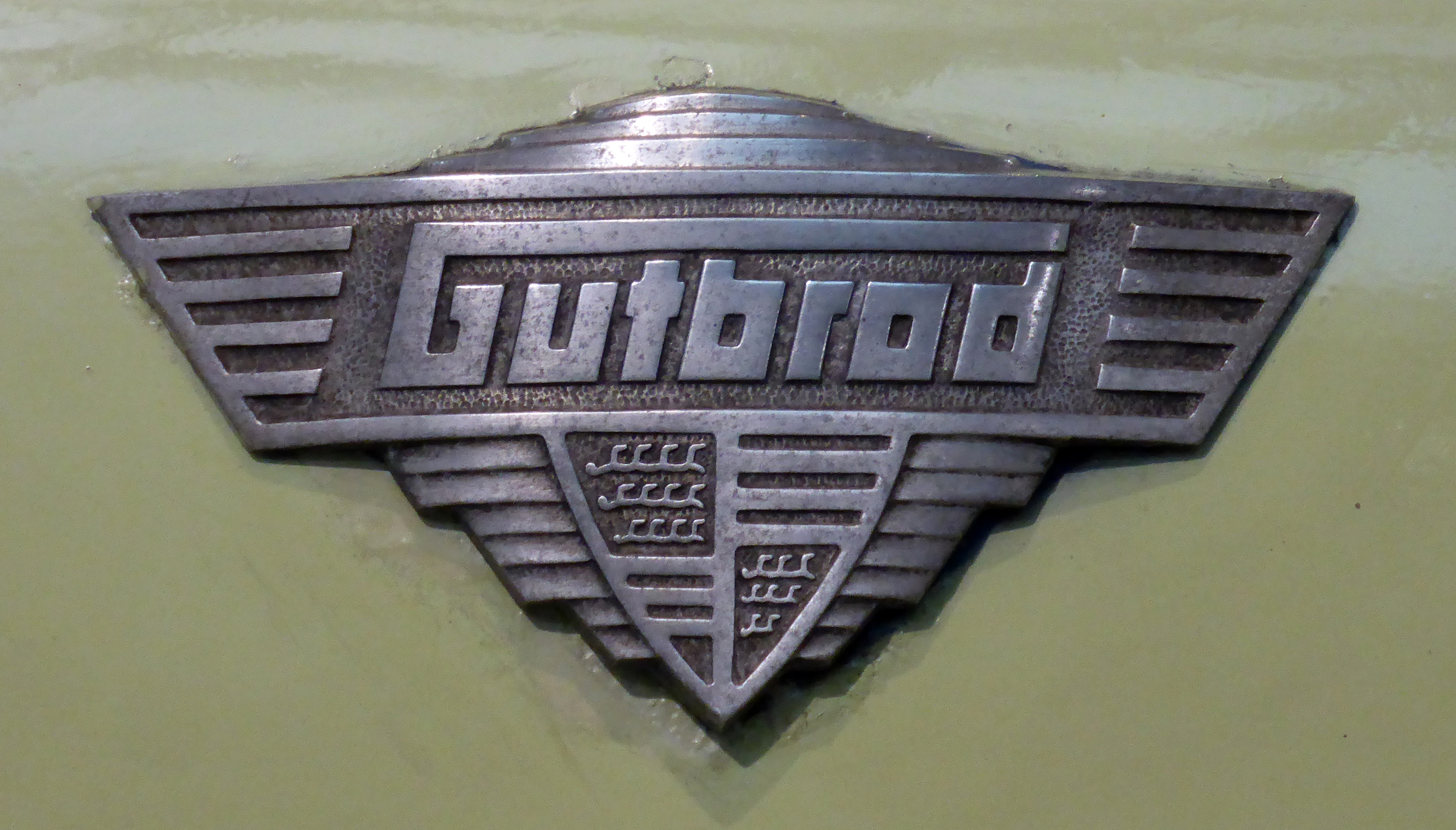
- Founded: 1926
- Founder: Wilhelm Gutbrod
- Headquarters: German
- Products: cars, motorcycles, agricultural machinery
- Website: www.gutbrod-online.eu

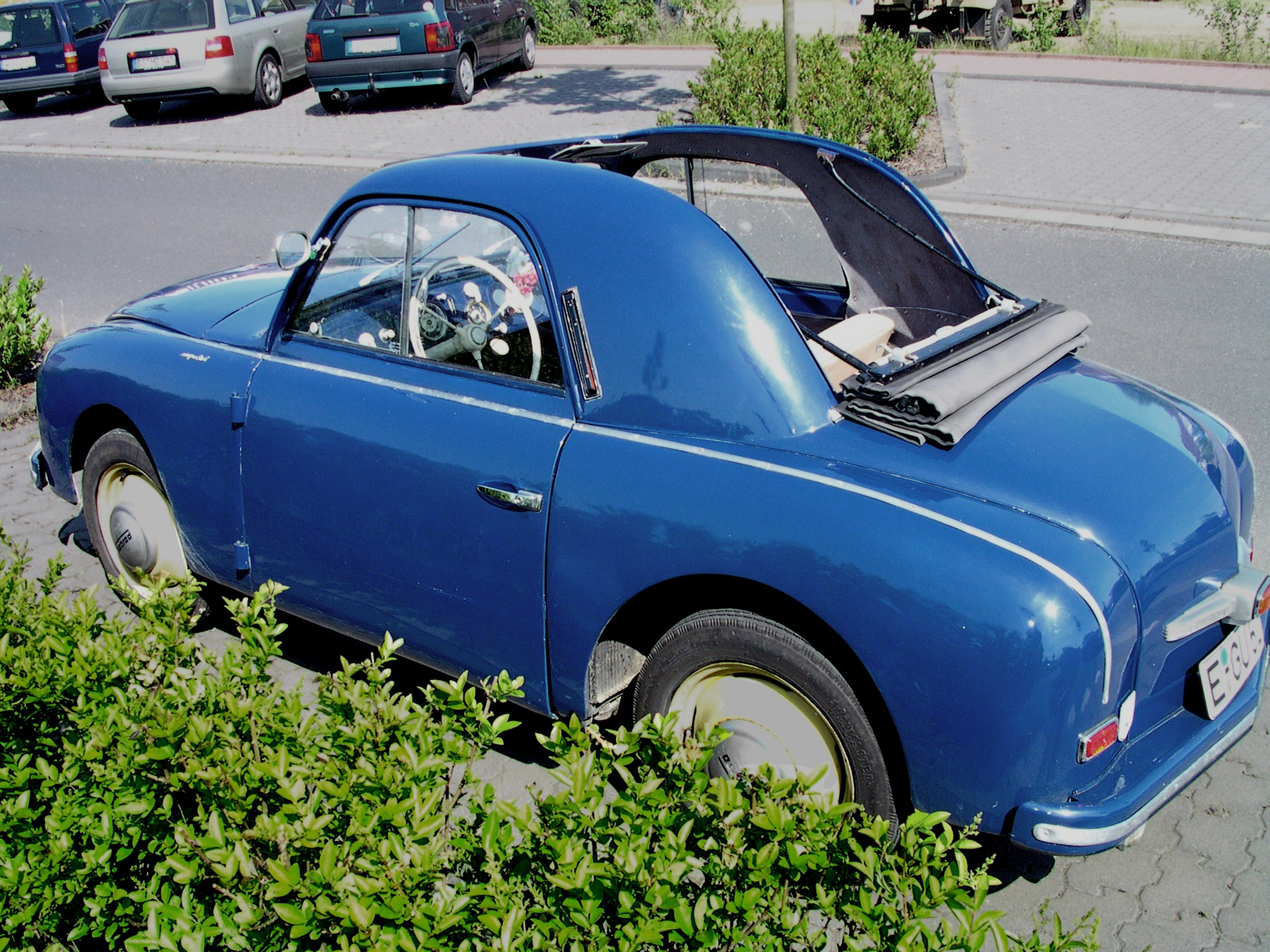
Gutbrod Superior

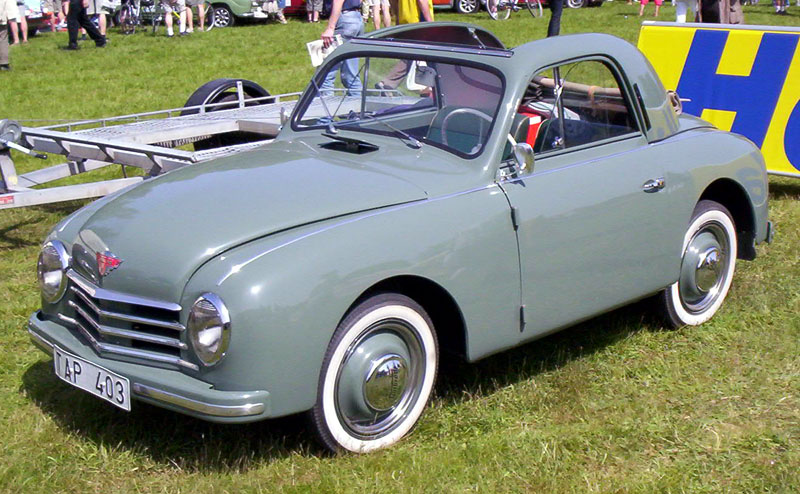
Gutbrod Superior 1951

Gutbrod was a German manufacturer of cars, motorcycles and small agricultural machinery. The firm was founded in Ludwigsburg, Germany by Wilhelm Gutbrod in 1926. It originally built "Standard" branded motorcycles. In 1933 the company relocated to the nearby Stuttgart suburb of Feuerbach, and from 1933 to 1935, Standard Superior cars were built with rear-mounted engines.

An updated version of the Gutbrod Superior introduced in 1953 benefited from developments towards fuel injection undertaken by Mercedes-Benz dating initially from 1935: this Gutbrod was the first car in the world to be offered with fuel injection, some three years before fuel injection appeared in a production engine offered by Mercedes themselves.

The small Gutbrod Superior model was produced from 1950 to 1954 using the company's own, front-mounted twin-cylinder two-stroke engines initially of 593cc. In April 1953 the engine size was increased to 663 cc for more expensive 'Luxus 700' versions of the car, while the standard model continued to be offered with the original smaller engine. Claimed power output was 20 hp (15 kW) for the base version, while for the larger engine 26 hp (19 kW) or 30 hp (22 kW) was claimed according to whether fuel feed came via a carburettor or a form of fuel injection. Press reports commended the speed and secure handling of the cars but indicated that the sporty handling came in return for sacrificing some comfort. It was also noted that normal conversation became impossible at speeds above about 80 km/h (50 mph) due to the noise.

7726 cars were produced before the factory was forced to close. The car was developed at the company's small factory at Plochingen am Neckar by Technical Director Dr. Hans Scherenberg during the time of Walter Gutbrod who had taken over the firm in 1948 on the death of his father, Wilhelm Gutbrod (26 February 1890 - 9 August 1948). Scherenberg arrived at Gutbrod from Mercedes where the victorious war-time allies had enforced a pause in engine fuel-injection development, and in 1952 he would return to that firm.

A Gutbrod injection engine can still be seen in the Deutsches Museum in Munich.

It was a small two seater car, the overall length was 3.5 m (11 ft), width 1.4 m (4.6 ft) and the total weight 650 kg (1,433 lb), max speed 90 km/h (56 mph). The car was offered as standard version for a price of DM 3990, and as Superior Luxus for DM 4380. Recently, a restoration project of an injection model was sold in Geneva for CHF 3000.

In 1956, the Norwegian Troll car was built on a Gutbrod chassis. pioneering the use of fibreglass in automobile coachwork along with the Chevrolet Corvette as well as some other small scale car manufacturers.

== Vehicles ==
Threewheeler

- Progress 200
- Standard Hermes
- Standard P203 and P503
- Standard E1

Vans and pickup trucks

- Standard Merkur
- Standard Progress
- Standard H204, H504, HV504, H254
- Standard Heck 504, 604
- Gutbrod Atlas 800, 1000, 1000/3, 800/H, 700

Passenger cars

- Standard Superior 500
- Gutbrod Superior, Superior Sport-Roadster, Superior Kombinationswagen (Stationwagon), SuperiorLuxus 700
- Gutbrod Superior Viersitzer 600 (Fourseater)
- Gutbrod Farmax

Tractors

- Gutbrod ND 15
- Gutbrod ND 25
- Gutbrod ND 36
