= Gutbrod Atlas =

1950s German van or pickup truck

Gutbrod Atlas 800
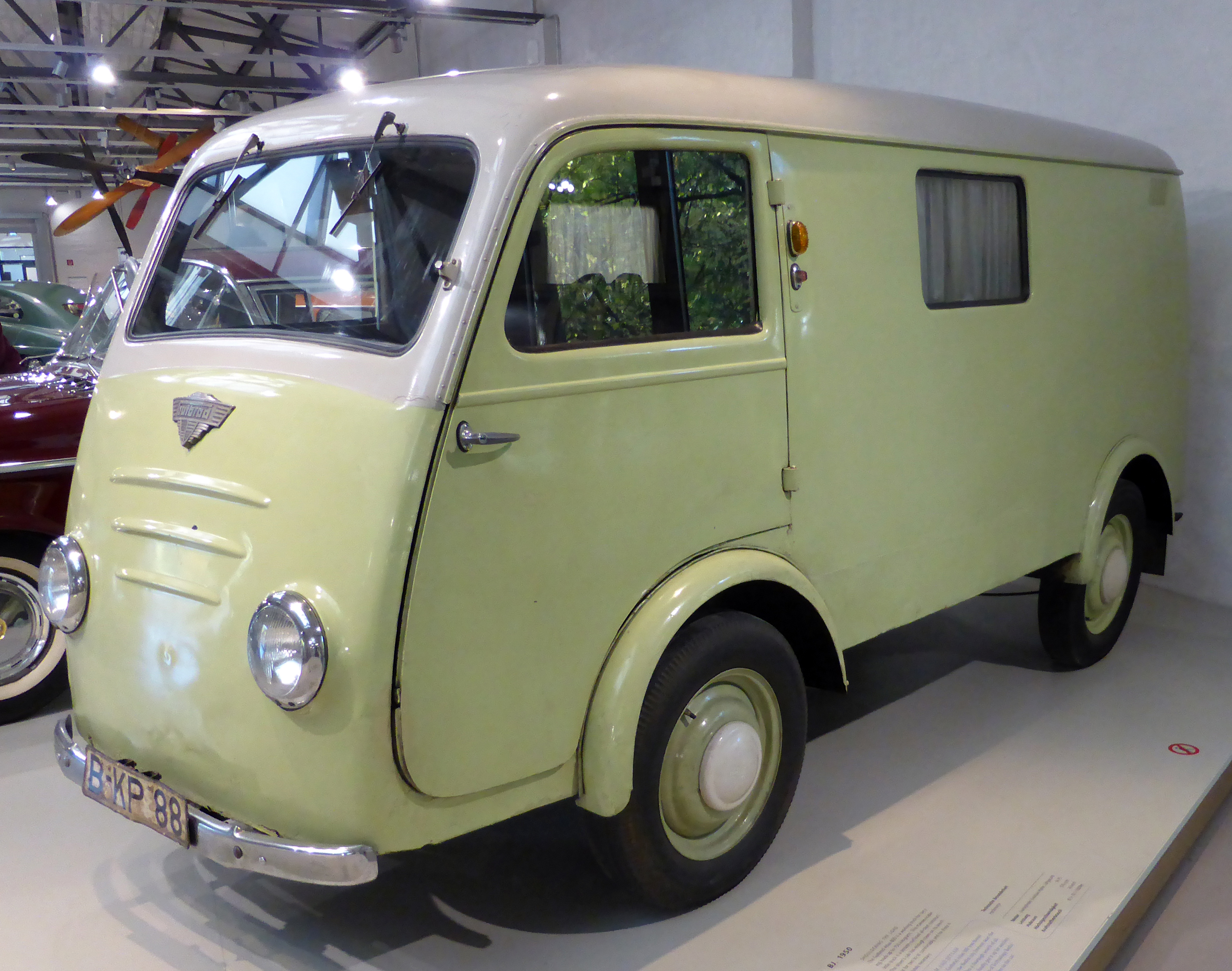

Overview
- Manufacturer: Calw division of Gutbrod Motorenbau G.m.b.H.
- Production: 1950 – 1954

Body and chassis
- Body style: panel van or pickup truck
- Layout: RR layout

Powertrain
- Engine: 576 cc two cylinder two-stroke engine
- Transmission: 3-speed gearbox

Dimensions
- Wheelbase: 2,200 mm (86.6 in)
- Length: 4,150 mm (163.4 in) flatbed 3,000 mm (118.1 in) panel van
- Width: 1,850 mm (72.8 in) flatbed 1,750 mm (68.9 in) panel van
- Height: 1,800 mm (70.9 in)
- Curb weight: 910–1,710 kg (2,006–3,770 lb) or 975–1,775 kg (2,150–3,913 lb)

Chronology
- Successor: none

The Gutbrod Atlas was a light panel van or pickup truck made by the Calw division of Gutbrod Motorenbau G.m.b.H. In 1950, its series production started in Calw, Germany. The vehicle's maximum permissible payload was either 700, 800, or 1000 kg. Top speed was 70 km/h (44 mph) with a fuel consumption of 9.8 l/100 km (24 mpg US); the fuel had an oil/gasoline ratio of 1:25. The Atlas was fitted with a 27-liter fuel tank.

The pilot production commenced in late 1949. Only in front did the vehicle have shock absorbers. A 400 mm steering wheel in with a 11:1 steering ratio was used. The Atlas has a 6 volts starter motor and a 75 Ah battery. Tires with a size of 5.50×16" were used. The vehicle's turning radius was 9.6 m (31.5 ft). The doors used were suicide doors, making the vehicle look very similar to its competitors Tempo Matador / Wiking and Goliath GV800. The VW T1 also competed the marked.

The following variations were produced:

- Atlas 800, January 1950 – February 1953
- Atlas 800/H, February 1953 – Mid 1954
- Atlas 1000, June 1951 – Mid 1954
- Atlas 1000/3, February 1953 – Mid 1954
- Atlas 700, June 1953 – Mid 1954

In April 1954, Gutbrod went bankrupt, and the vehicle production came to an end.
