= Goliath Goli =

German pickup truck

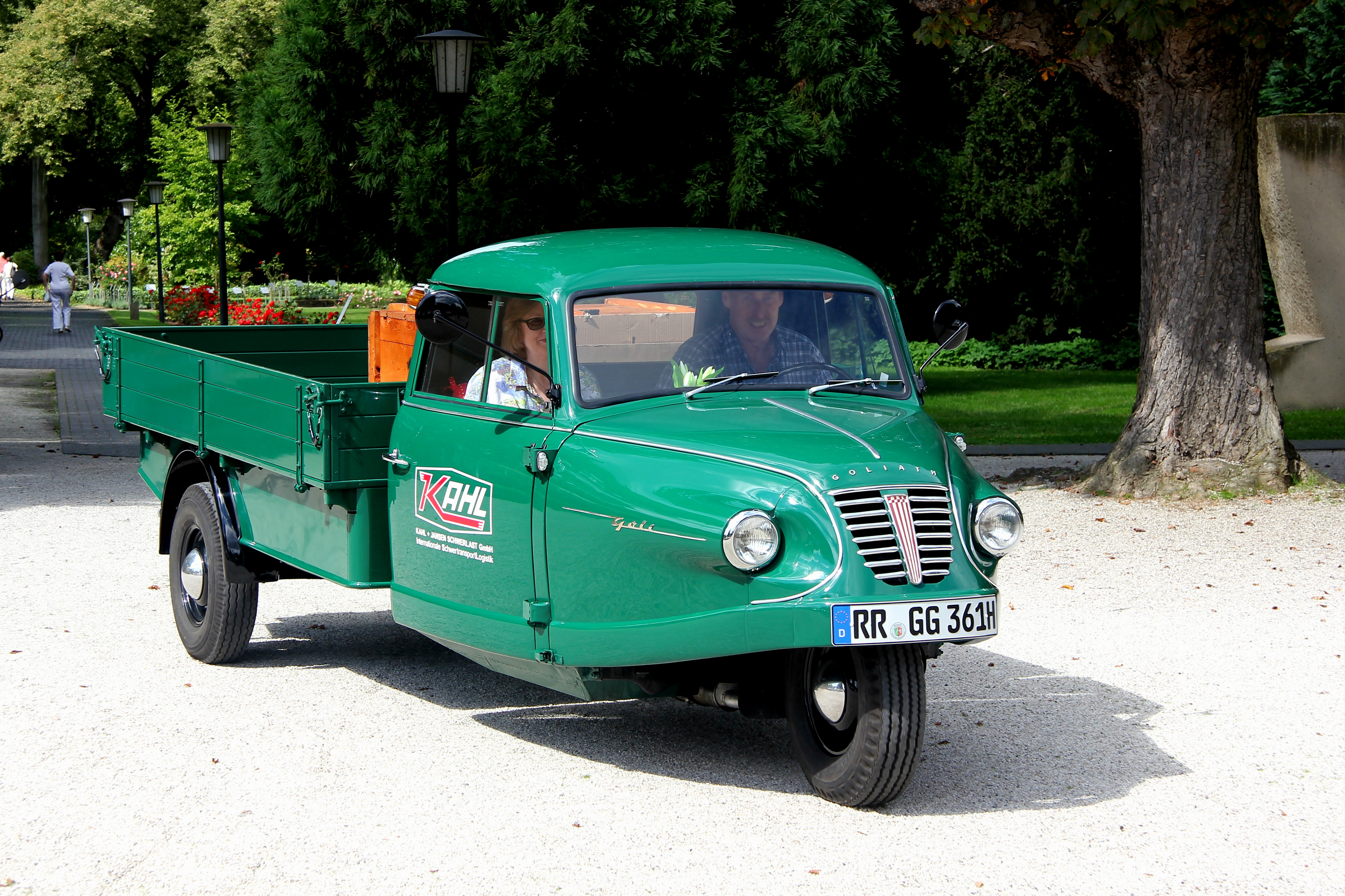
- Goliath Goli pickup truck

Overview
- Manufacturer: Hansa-Lloyd and Goliath-Werke
- Production: Goliath Company, Bremen, Germany
- Model years: 1955-1961

Body and chassis
- Class: light truck
- Body style: pickup truck, panel van, freight box
- Layout: MR layout

Powertrain
- Engine: two-stroke 465 cc 2l-engine 11 kW (15 hp) at 4000–4500 rpm
- Transmission: unsynchronized manual 4-speed gear-box

Dimensions
- Wheelbase: 116–132 in (2,950–3,350 mm)
- Length: 179–207 in (4,550–5,250 mm)
- Width: 69–75 in (1,750–1,910 mm)
- Height: 40,640 mm (1,600 in)
- Curb weight: 1,609–3,968 lb (730–1,800 kg) or 1,742–3,968 lb (790–1,800 kg)

Chronology
- Predecessor: Goliath GD750
- Successor: none

The Goliath Goli was a pickup truck or panel van built from 1955 to 1961 by the Goliath division of Borgward in Bremen, Germany. It is the successor of the Goliath GD750 and the last German built three-wheeler truck. Only 9,904 vehicles of this model were produced.

== Technology ==
With its three wheels and a water-cooled two-cylinder two-stroke engine, the Goliath Goli continued a design principle that had long been a thing of the past for other vehicle manufacturers. Decisive for the use of only three wheels was the vehicle's approximately 30% lower production price. The Goliath Goli incorporated a sophisticated design. The engine was mounted behind the front wheel and provided a low centre of gravity, and the 6.40×13 tires ensured an optimum of stability and drive safety for a freight tricycle. Initially, an air-cooled engine rated 12.5 kW was used, but it had thermal problems. From 1957, a different 465 cm³ engine with water-cooling was used. The power of this engine was 11 kW. It was deemed too weak for a 0.75 t freight vehicle. Maximum torque was only 34 N·m at 2500 rpm. At full load, the vehicle had a power-to-weight ratio of 160 kg/kW. To avoid further bad criticism, Goliath offered replacing the air-cooled engine with a passively thermosiphon-cooled one for free. The Goli had a U-profile ladderframe, a control arm with a quarter elliptical spring for its front wheel, a solid rear axle with progressive leaf springs, a worm drive steering system, a hydraulic three wheel braking system, a parking brake for the rear wheels, and an all-steel cab. The 6 volts electric starter did not have a magnetic switch, instead, it was manually connected to the engine using a hand lever. The Goli's top speed was 60 km/h (37 mph). Fuel consumption was 7.5 l/100 km (31 mpg). Climb rate limit at full load was 23, 12, 7, 3% (depending on the gear). The turning radius is 11 m (36 ft).

== Variants ==
The flatbed version was available in a low and a high variant. The lower variant offered a capacity of 6 m³ (211 cft). There was also the full-metal panel van and separated freight box body variant. The vehicles external dimensions of the freight box variant were 2200 × 1460 × 1230 mm (68 × 58 × 9 inch). Depending on body and tires, the payload was 750 to 950 kg (1653 to 2094 lb).

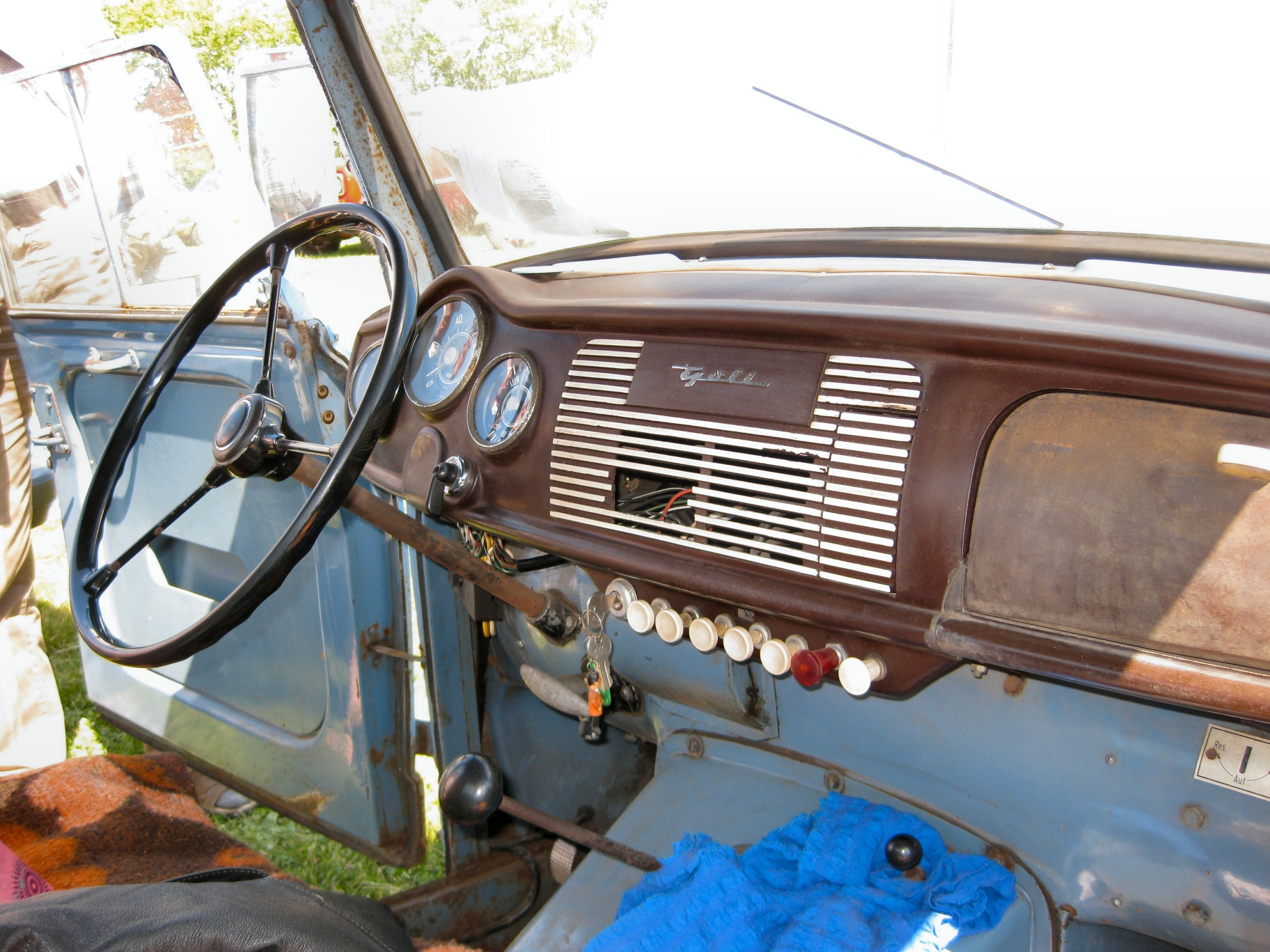
Dashboard of the Goli

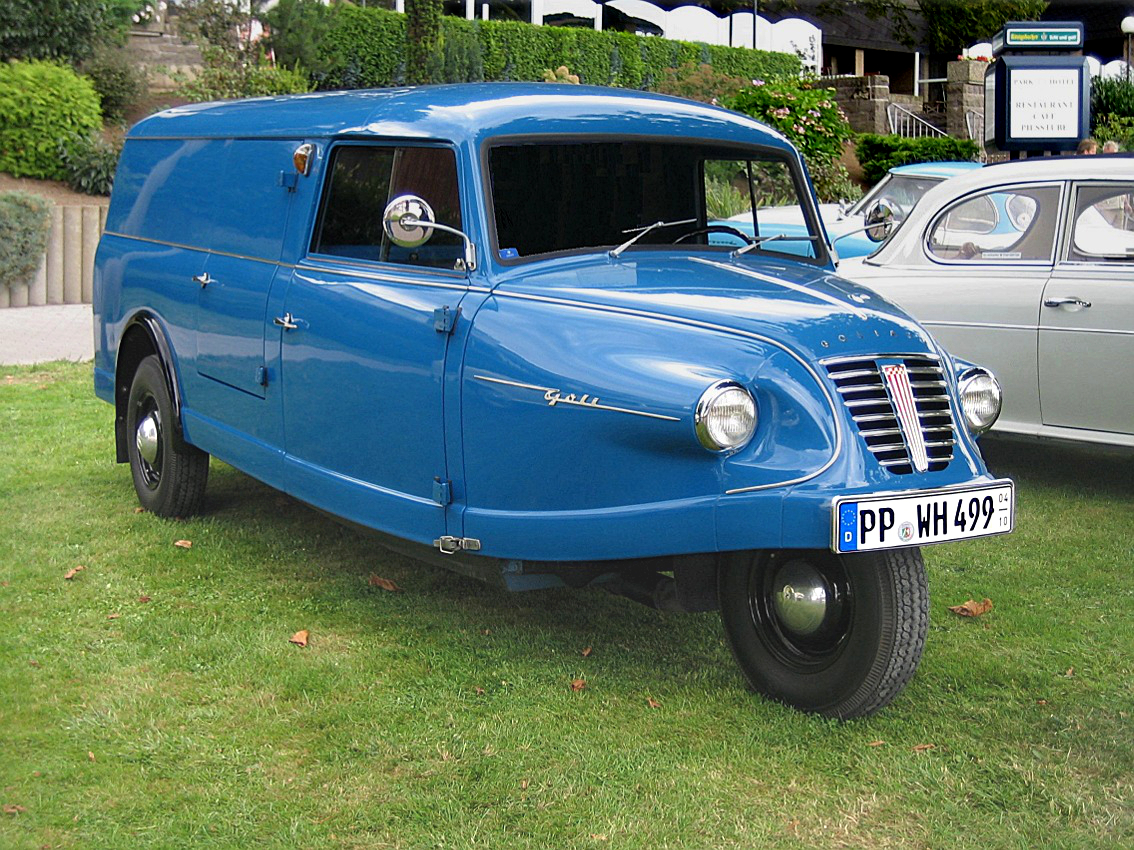
Goli with panel van body

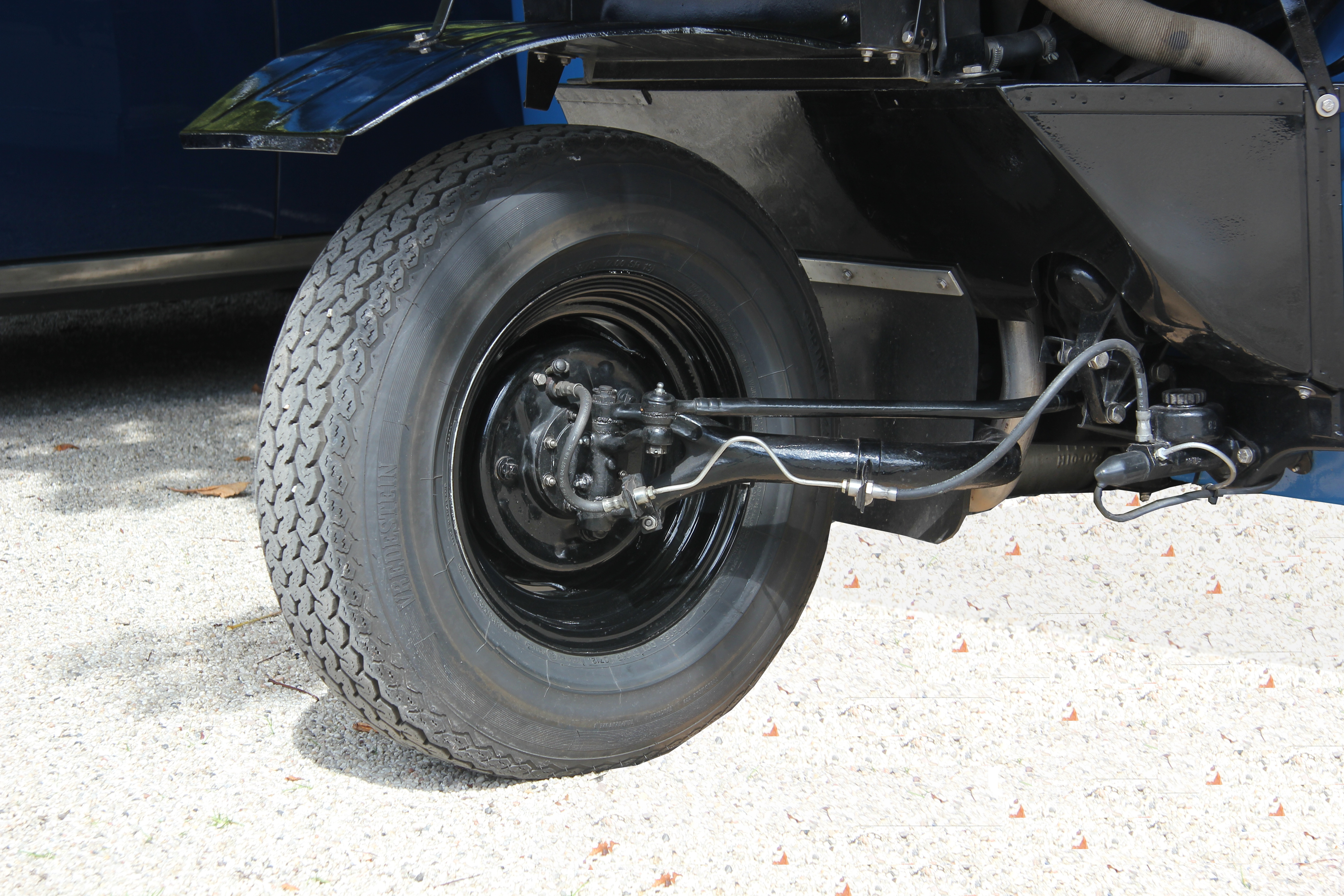
Wheel suspension and steering
