= Goliath GD750 =

German pickup truck

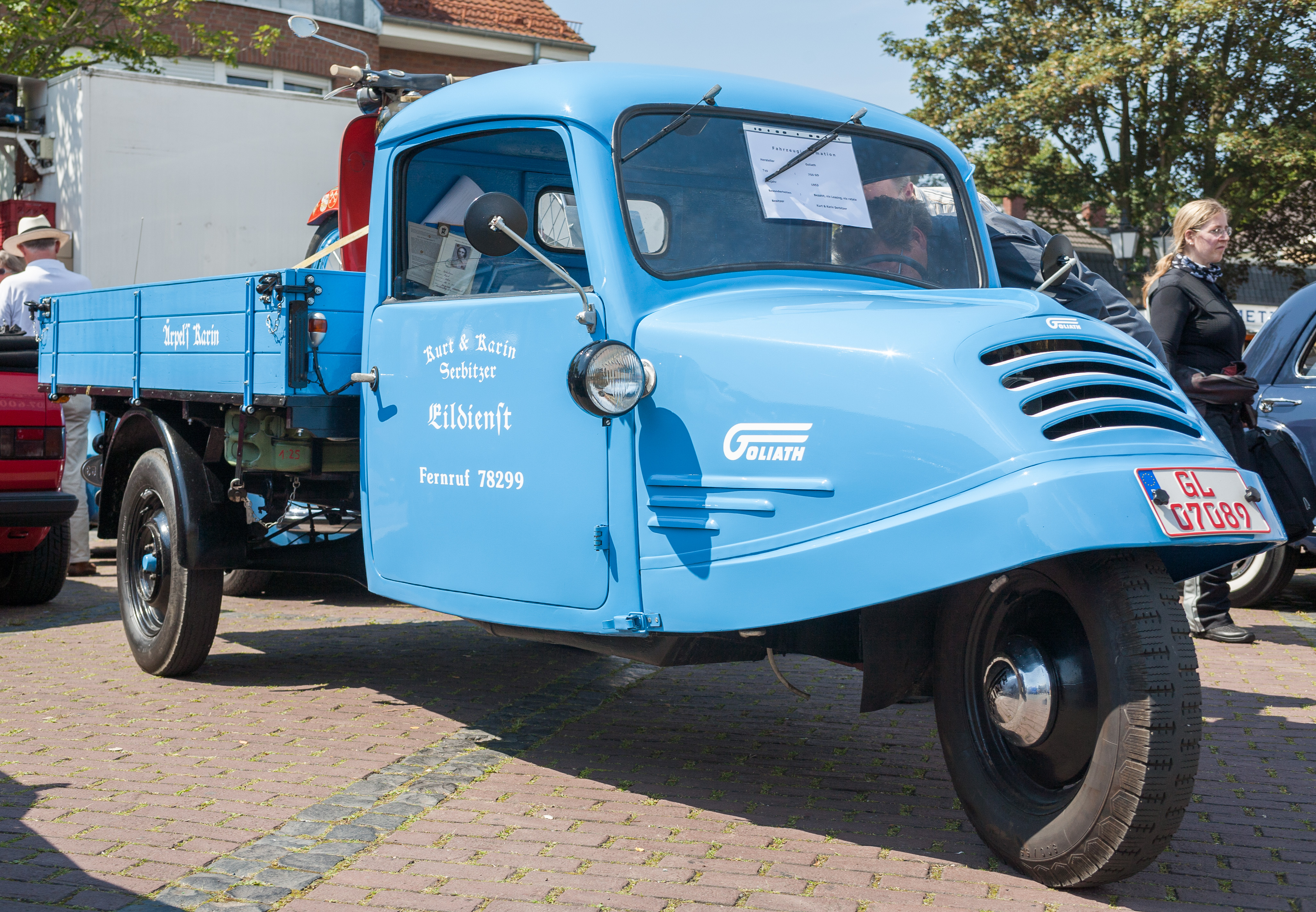
- 1953 Goliath GD750

Overview
- Manufacturer: Hansa-Lloyd and Goliath-Werke Borgward & Tecklenburg
- Production: Goliath Company, Bremen, Germany
- Model years: 1949-1955

Body and chassis
- Layout: MR layout

Powertrain
- Engine: straight-2 two stroke engine: 0.4–0.5 Liter (10–11 kW)
- Transmission: constant-mesh 4-speed manual gearbox

Dimensions
- Wheelbase: 116–132 in (2,950–3,350 mm)
- Length: 174–203 in (4,410–5,160 mm)
- Width: 68–80 in (1,720–2,020 mm)
- Height: 65 in (1,650 mm)
- Kerb weight: 1,532–3,208 lb (695–1,455 kg) or 1,786–3,858 lb (810–1,750 kg)

Chronology
- Predecessor: Goliath FW200 and FW400
- Successor: Goliath Goli

The Goliath GD750 was a three-wheeler pickup truck built by the Goliath division of the Borgward Group in Bremen from April 1949 to 1955 in various body variants. In the early 1950s, low-cost vans were popular with small craft businesses. In 1949, the purchase price for flatbed variant was DM 3600. In total, 30,093 units of the GD750 were built. In 1950 and 1951, a huge quantity of vehicles were built, 8468 and 7136 units respectively. The number 750 in the type designation indicated the possible payload of 750 kg (1653 lb).

== Technical description ==
The GD750 had a water-cooled two-cylinder two-stroke engine, displacing 396 cm³ (60 mm bore × 70 mm stroke). It that was rated 13 PS (9.6 kW) at 4000/min (factory documents vary from 13 to 14.5 PS). The vehicle's top speed is 50-55 km/h (31-34 mph). A constant-mesh four-speed gearbox was standard. The torque was sent to the rear axle with cardan shaft, as opposed to the front-wheel drive Tempo freight tricycles. An air-cooled 494 cm³ engine (67 mm bore × 70 mm stroke) with 16 PS (11.8 kW) was available as a factory option that cost DM 75. With this engine, the rated top speed was still 50-55 km/h. The engine was installed behind the front wheel. Unlike in the pre-war models F200 and F400, which used engines made by ILO-Motorenwerke, the engines for the GD750 were made by Goliath, and designed by August Momberger's engineering office INKA (engineer-construction-consortium).

The truck had a U-profile, V-shaped frame; the front wheel had single control arm suspension with a semi elliptic spring, the rear axle was a live axle with semi elliptic leaf springs. The brakes were mechanically operated; from 1953 onwards, they were hydraulically actuated. The chassis was available with different flatbed and box variants with a wheelbase of either 2950 or 3350 mm, and a tread width of either 1400 or 1600 mm. The length of the GD750 varied as well as its width; three different lengths were available (4410, 4660 or 5160 mm), and four different widths (1720, 1770, 1929 or 2020 mm), the height of all vehicles was 1650 mm. The fuel consumption was rated 7 l/100 km (40 mpg (Imp.)). Initially, the GD750 was fitted with a 6 V, 90 W generator; later, it received a 6 V, 130 W one.

== Variants ==
Most GD750 units produced were equipped with a flatbed. In addition to the flatbed and the box bodies, there were also numerous special body variants available; for instance, a livestock transporter and a mobile shop. In total, 26 different body variants were offered. The kerb weight was between 695 and 810 kg, the permissible total weight between 1455 and 1750 kg, depending on the body. In 1950, the prices were DM 3475 for the smallest flatbed, DM 4300 for the estate, and the "special carriage for livestock transport" cost DM 4805; a heater was a DM 65 extra, hydraulic brakes cost an additional DM 115.

== Advertising for the Goliath GD750 ==
In contemporary advertisements, the Goliath tricycle was often compared with the competitor "Tempo". Unlike the Tempo, the Goliath had rear-wheel drive, which was emphasised: "The reliable rear-wheel drive masters every incline even on snowy and slippery roads", "Goliath with rear-wheel drive, the economical 3/4 ton freight truck with the driving characteristics of a four-wheel car". To prove the quality of the tricycle chassis, Goliath built a world record vehicle with chassis parts from the GD750, a passenger car engine from the Goliath GP700, and an aluminum streamline body. In August 1951, this world record vehicle reached an average speed of 155 km/h for a time period of over two hours on the Monthléry race track. In total, it broke 38 world records. Goliath's success caused many newspaper articles and thus free advertising. In attempts to break even more records, Goliath factory driver Hugo Steiner died in an accident on the Hockenheimring, which caused Goliath to stop breaking world records with freight vehicles.

Goliath GD750

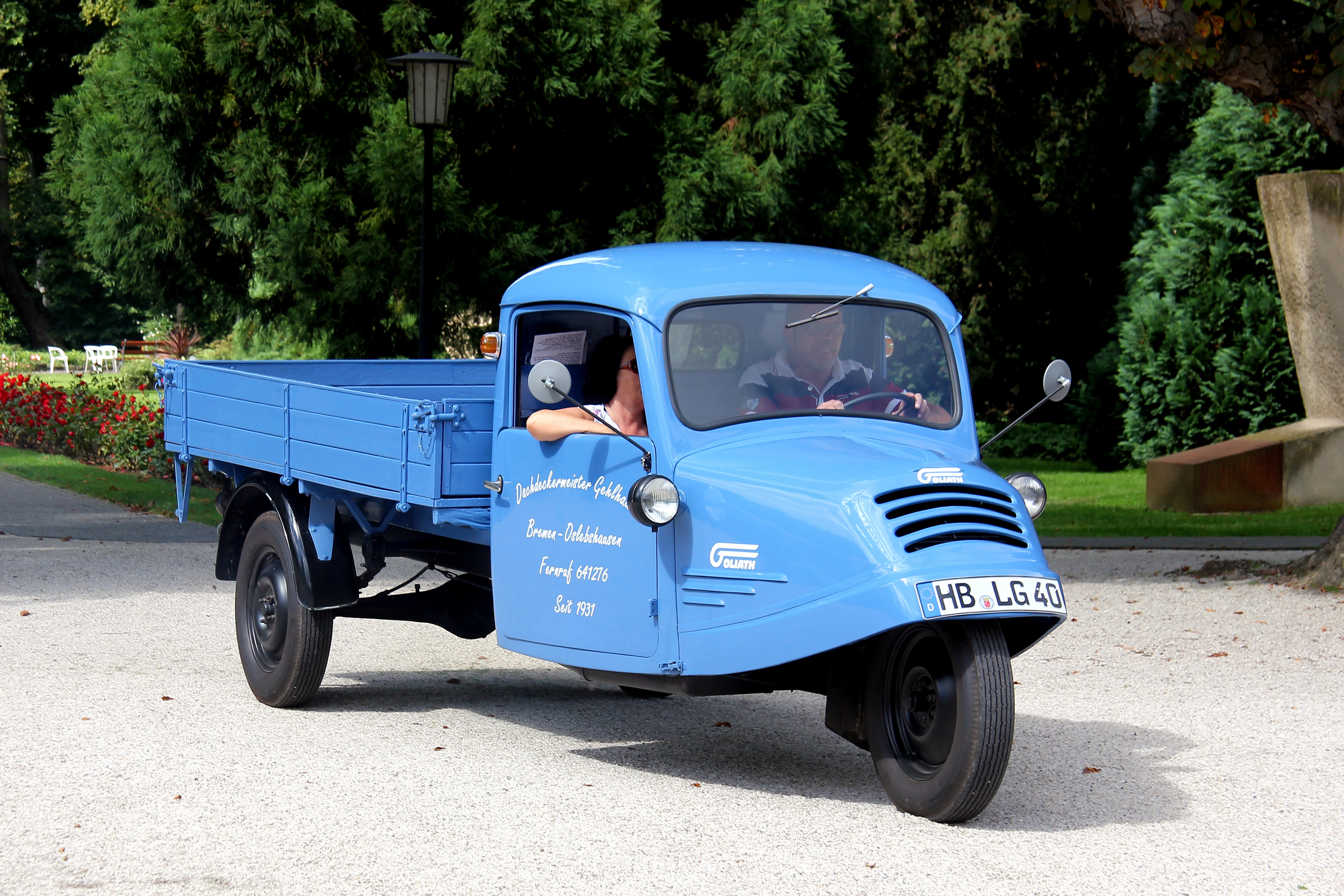
Flatbet

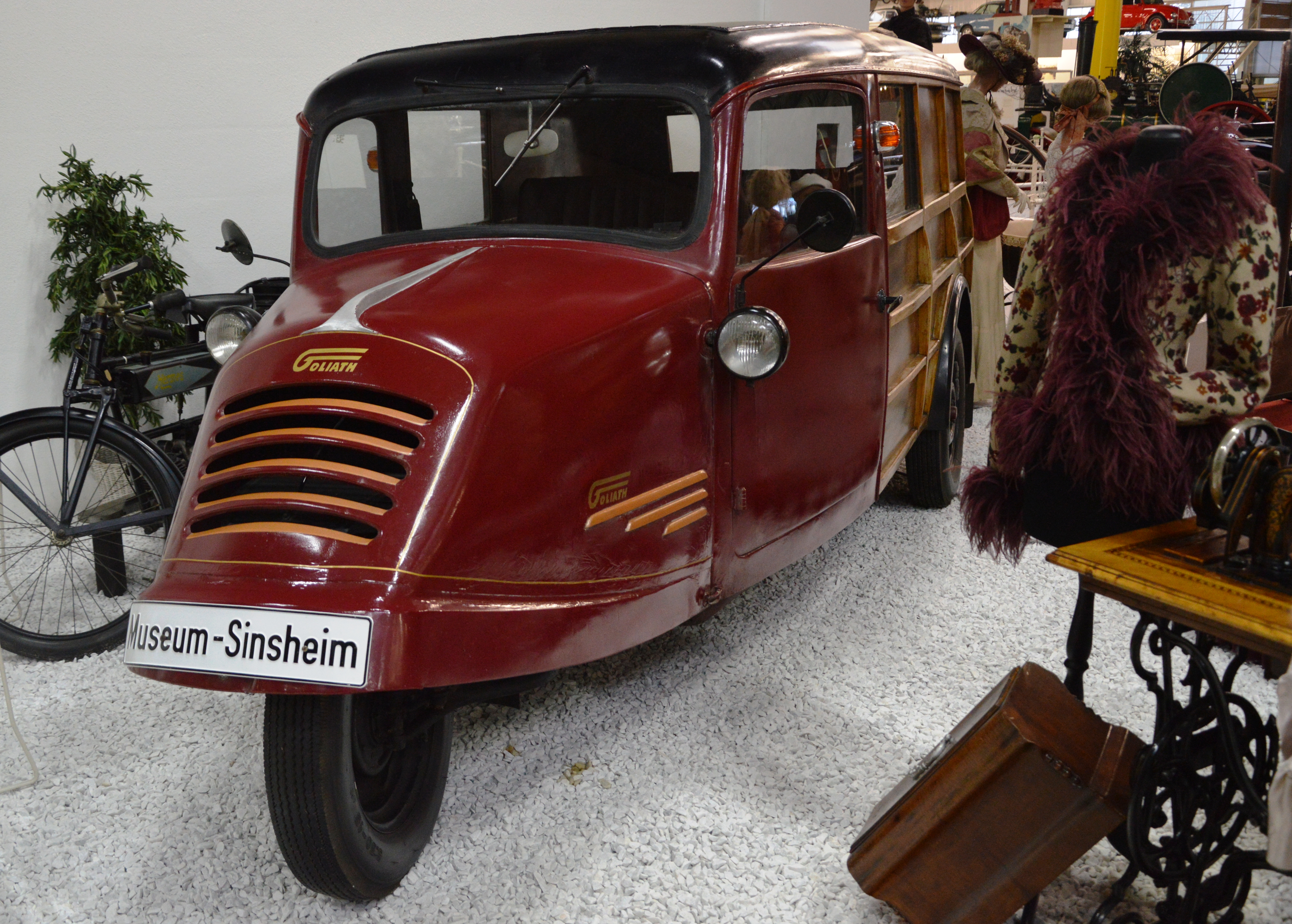
Wood body „Woody“

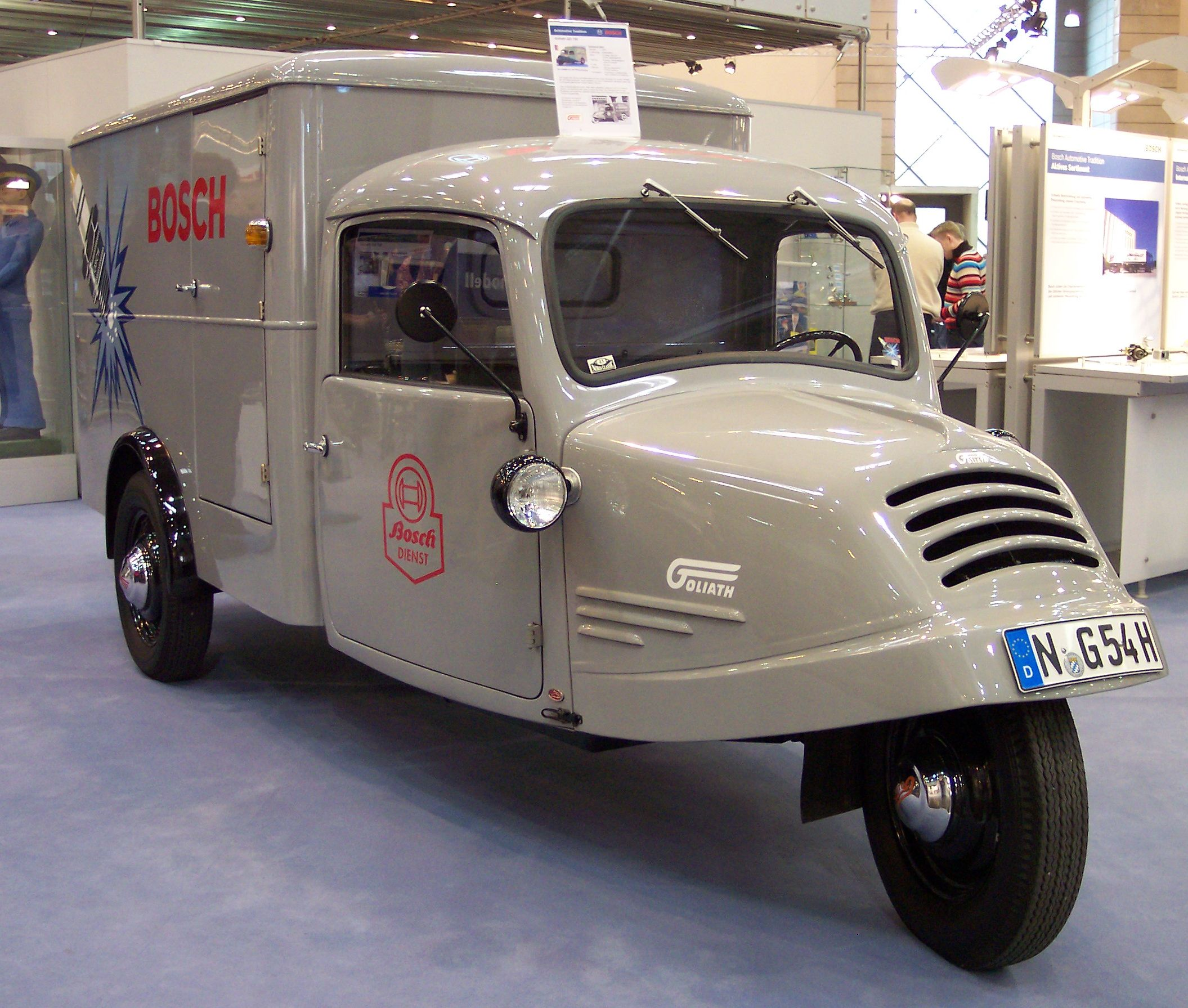
Panel van

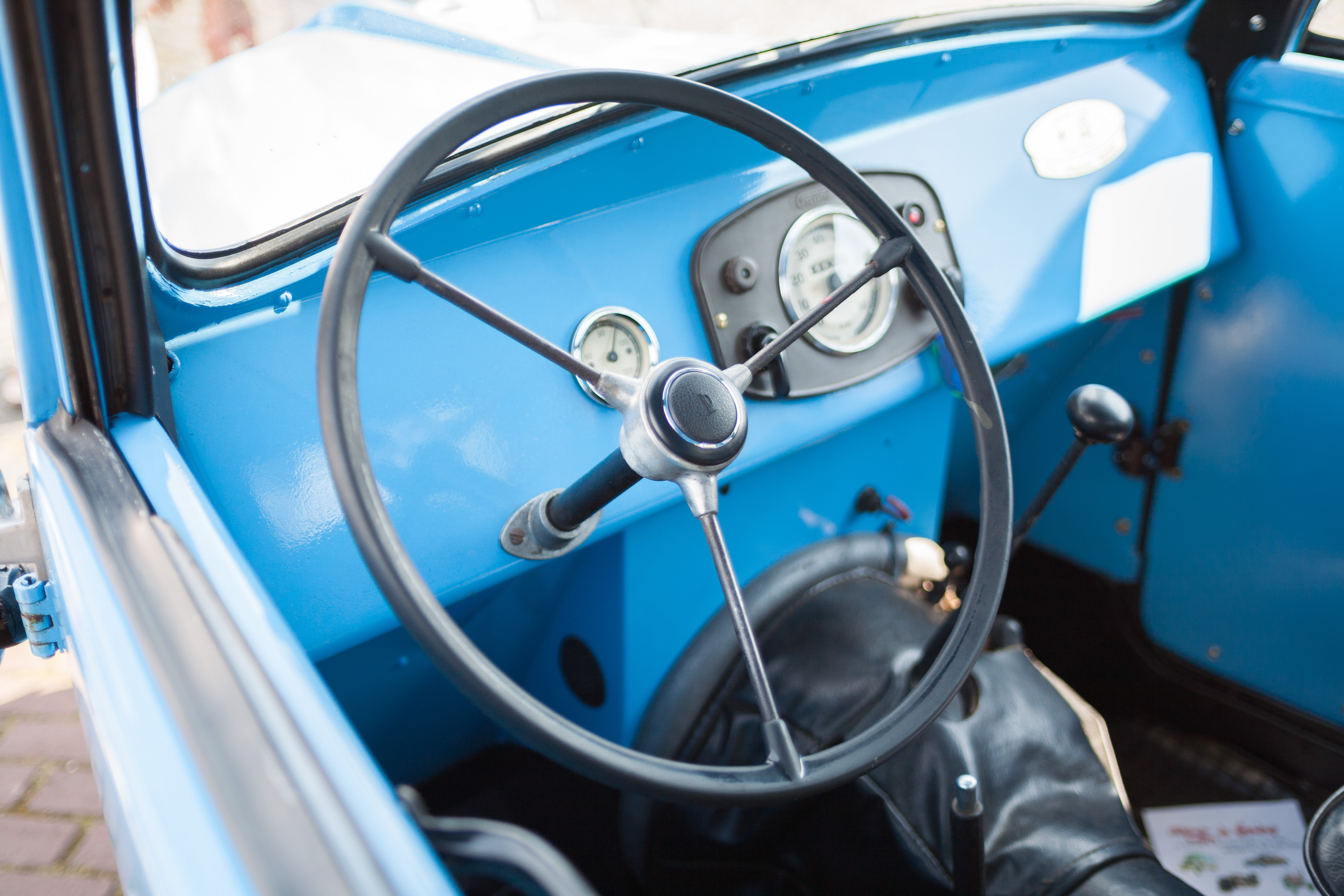
Dashboard

== Competitors ==
- Agria Triro
- Tempo Boy
- Piaggio Ape
- Innocenti Lambretta FD
- Glas Goggo 200 Lastenroller, cabless only (1954-1955)
