= Economy car =

Car designed for low-cost purchase and operation

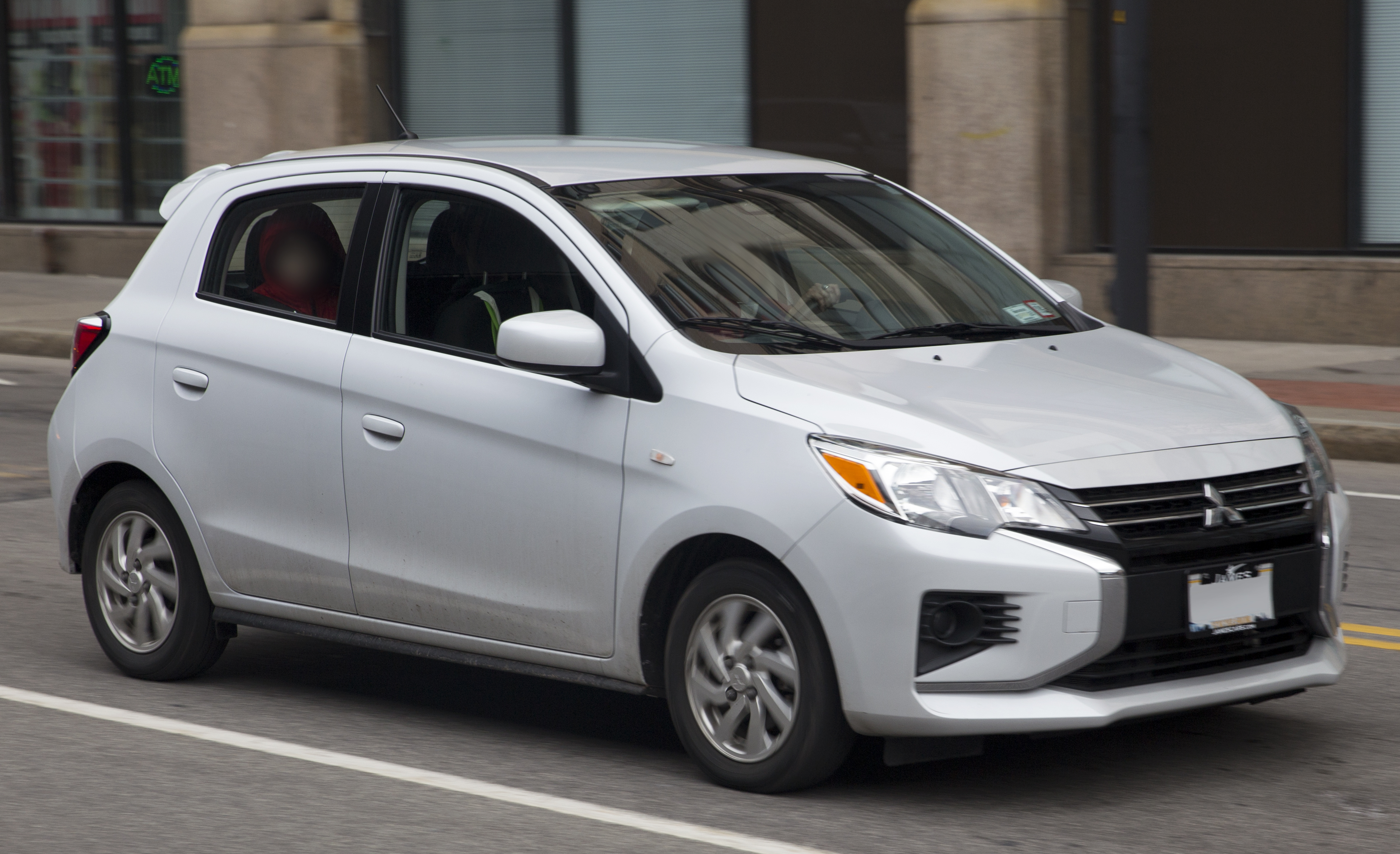
As of 2025, the Mitsubishi Mirage is the cheapest new car for sale in the US with a claimed 43 mpg_{‑US} (5.5 L/100 km; 52 mpg_{‑imp})

Economy car is a term mostly used in the United States for cars designed for low-cost purchase and operation. Typical economy cars are small (compact or subcompact), lightweight, and inexpensive to both produce and purchase. Stringent design constraints generally force economy car manufacturers to be inventive. Many innovations in automobile design were originally developed for economy cars, such as the Ford Model T and the Austin Mini.

== Definition ==
The precise definition of what constitutes an economy car has varied with time and place, based on the conditions prevailing at the time, such as fuel prices, disposable income of buyers, and cultural mores. It typically refers to a car that is designed to be small and lightweight to offer low-cost operation. In any given decade globally, there has generally been some rough consensus on what constituted the minimum necessary requirements for a highway-worthy car, constituting the most economical car possible. However, whether that consensus could be a commercial success in any given country depended on local culture. Thus in any given decade, every country has had a rough national consensus on what constituted the minimum necessary requirements for the least expensive car that wasn't undesirable, that is, that had some commercially attractive amount of market demand, making it a mainstream economy car. In many countries at various times, mainstream economy and maximum economy have been one and the same.

== Background ==
From its inception into the 1920s, the Ford Model T fulfilled both of these roles simultaneously in the U.S. and in many markets around the world. In Europe and Japan in the 1920s and 1930s, this was achieved by the much smaller Austin 7 and its competitors and derivatives. From the 1940s and into the 1960s, the Volkswagen Beetle played both roles throughout much of the world, particularly in Germany and Latin America – due to high fuel consumption, British, French, Italian, and Japanese models, all with better fuel economy, were able to capture the maximum-economy position in their home countries. By the 1970s the hatchback had become the standard body type for new economy car models.

From 1960-1994 the Soviet Union sold the economy car Zaporozhets (and in the 80s, its successors, ZAZ-1102, and VAZ-1111) on the world market. In the mid-1980s, the Yugoslavian Zastava Koral (Yugo), was being sold as the cheapest new car on the U.S. market. South Korea's Hyundai models also sold well in the U.S., and have gone on to be successful around the world.

Since the 1990s, the automotive industry has become extensively globalized, with all major manufacturers being multinational corporations who use globally sourced raw materials and components, with most moving assembly to the lowest labour cost countries. Today, a majority of major manufacturer offers economy cars, including at least one truly small car that may fall into subclassifications such as subcompact car, supermini, B-segment; city car; microcar; and others.

Gordon Murray, the Formula 1 and McLaren F1 designer, said when designing his new Murray T.25 city car: "I would say that building a car to sell for six thousand pounds and designing that for a high-volume production, where you have all the quality issues under control, is a hundred times more difficult than designing a McLaren F1, or even a racing car. It is certainly the biggest challenge I've ever had from a design point of view."

== History ==
=== 1886–1920 ===
The history of the automobile after many experimental models dating back at least a hundred years, started with the first production car – the 1886 Benz Tricycle. This began a period that was later known as the Brass era which is considered to be from 1890 to 1918 in the U.S. In the UK this is split into the pre-1905 Veteran era and Edwardian era to 1918. The U.S. Veteran era is usually dated pre-1890.

In the 1890s and into the first decade of the twentieth century; the motorized vehicle was considered a replacement for the carriages of the rich, or simply a dangerous toy, that annoyed and inconvenienced the general public. For example, the 1908 children's book The Wind in the Willows, pokes fun at early privileged motorists. The automotive industry in France were the world leaders during this period – the Locomotives Act 1865 (the 'Red Flag Act') had obstructed automotive development in the UK until it was mostly repealed by the Locomotives on Highways Act 1896. The high wheeler was an early car body style virtually unique to the United States. It was typified by large-diameter slender wheels, frequently with solid tires, to provide ample ground clearance on the primitive roads in much of the country at the turn of the 20th century. For the same reason, it usually had a wider track than normal automobiles.

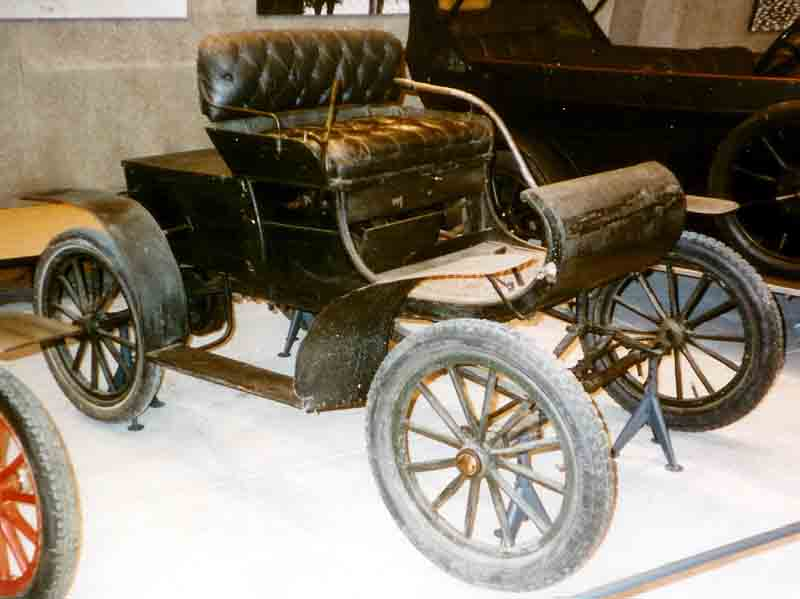
1902 Oldsmobile Curved Dash runabout

The first car to be marketed as an 'economy car' was the 1901–1907 Oldsmobile Curved Dash - it was produced by the thousands, with over 19,000 built in all. It was inspired by the buckboard type horse and buggy, (used like a small two-seat pickup truck) popular in rural areas of the U.S. It had two seats, but was less versatile than the vehicle that inspired it. It was produced after a fire at the Oldsmobile plant, when the prototype was saved by a nightwatchman named Stebbins (who later became the Mayor of Detroit) and was the only product available to the company to produce.

Although cars were becoming more affordable before it was launched, the 1908–1927 Ford Model T is considered to be the first true economy car, because the very few previous vehicles at the bottom of the market were 'horseless carriages' rather than practical cars. The major manufacturers at the time had little interest in low-priced models. The first 'real' cars had featured the FR layout first used by the French car maker Panhard and so did the Model T.

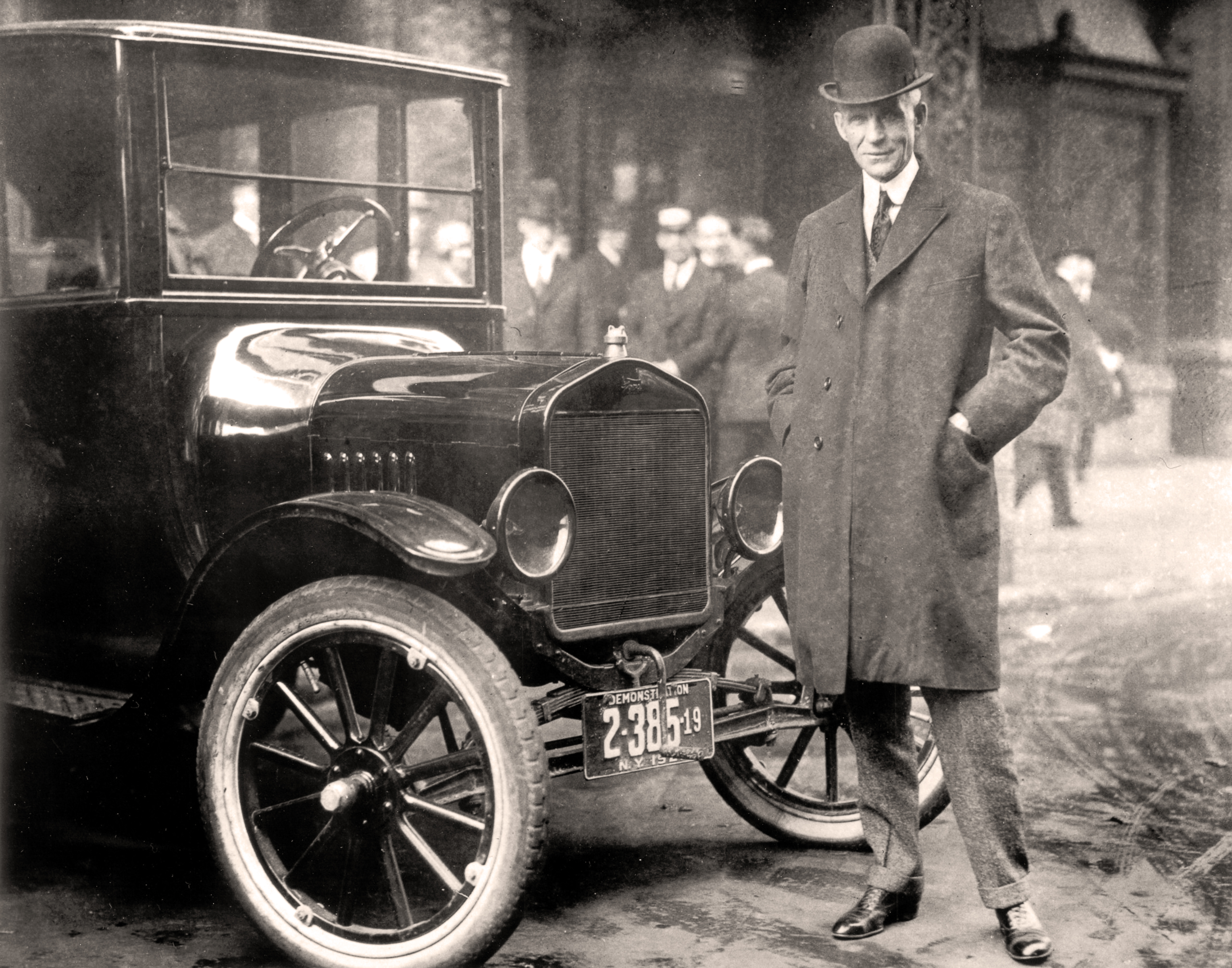
Henry Ford with Model T, 1921

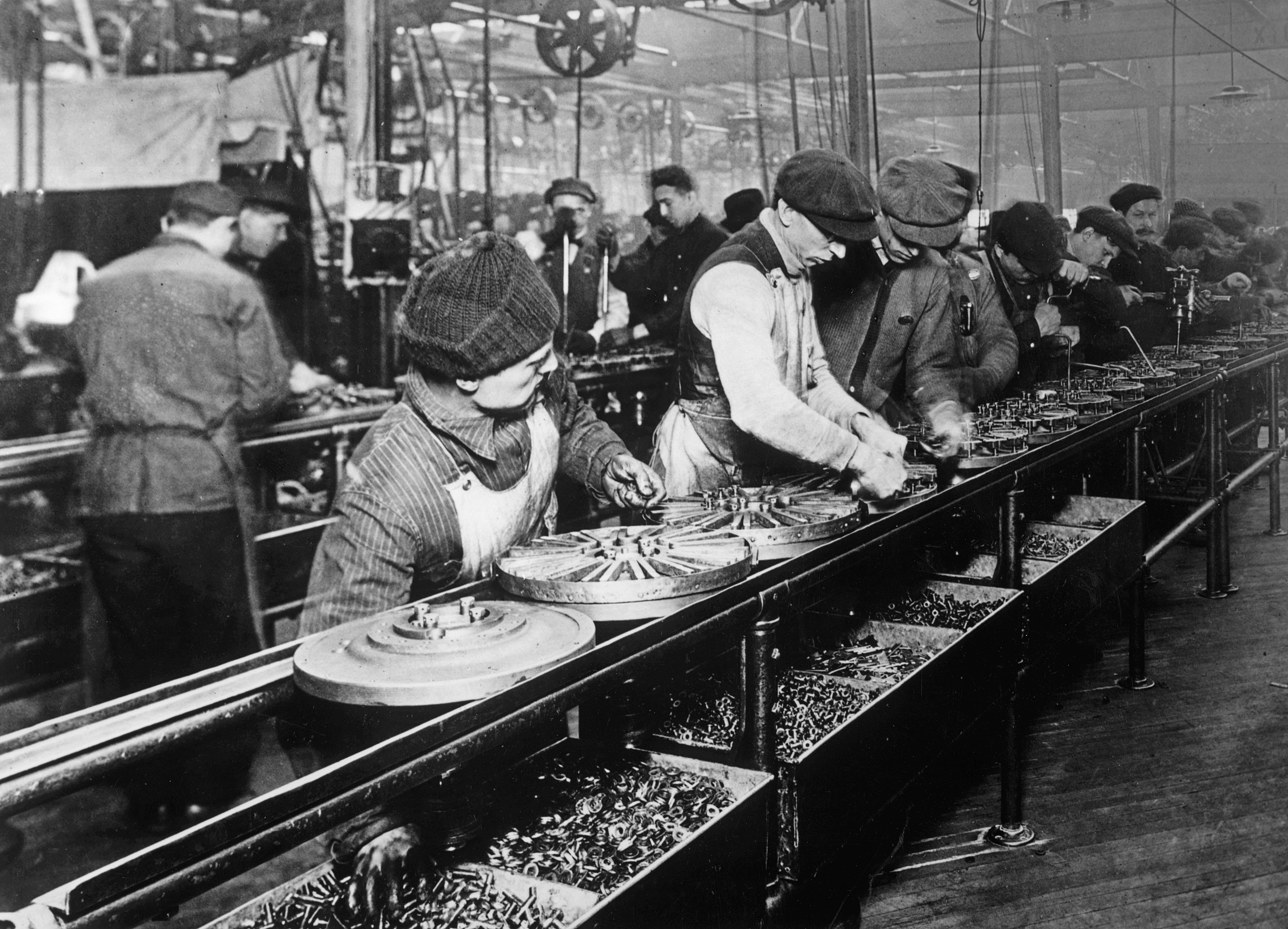
Ford assembly line, 1913. The magneto assembly line was the first.

Henry Ford declared at the launch of the vehicle:

I will build a car for the great multitude. It will be large enough for the family, but small enough for the individual to run and care for. It will be constructed of the best materials, by the best men to be hired, after the simplest designs that modern engineering can devise. But it will be low in price that no man making a good salary will be unable to own one - and enjoy with his family the blessing of hours of pleasure in God's great open spaces.

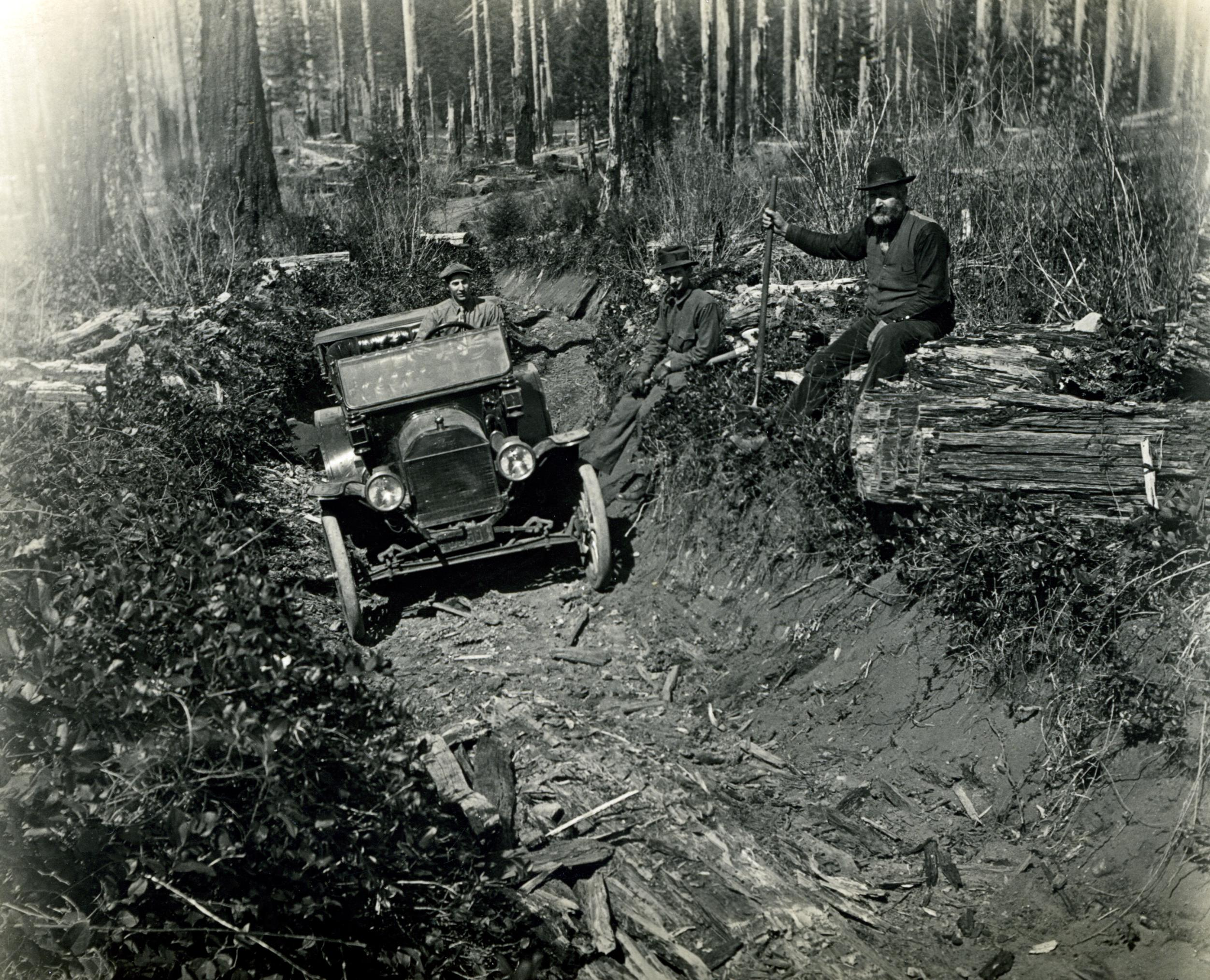
Model T on a New Road

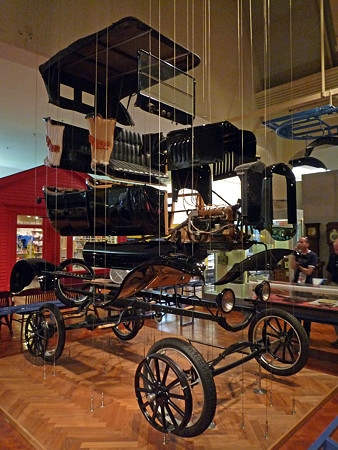
'Exploded' Ford Model T at the Henry Ford Museum

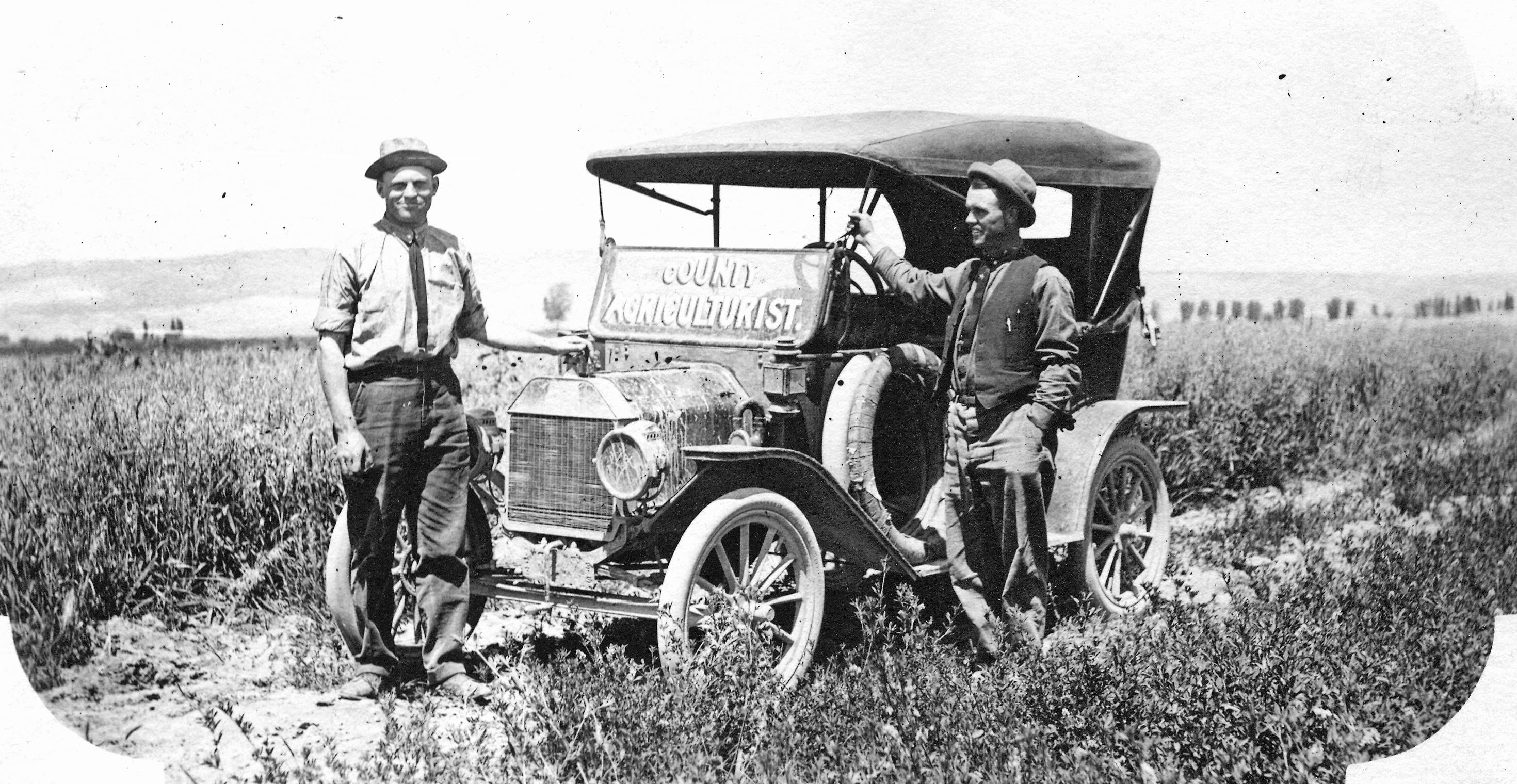
Agricultural extension agents in Eastern Oregon, 1915

The Ford Model T was a large scale mass-produced car; that very innovation, along with the attributes it required a simple inexpensive design, that allowed it to be the first car to exemplify the ideals of the economy car. Although it followed the Panhard mechanical layout, it used an epicyclic gearbox more like later automatic gearboxes, rather than the Panhard type manual gearbox, which in a developed form is still in common use today. The innovations involved in making it a successful design were in its production and materials technology; particularly the use of new vanadium steel alloys. Model T production was a leading example of the Taylorism school of scientific management (also known as Fordism) and its production techniques evolved at the Highland Park Ford Plant that opened in 1910, after it outgrew the Piquette Avenue Plant. The River Rouge Plant which opened in 1919, was the most technologically advanced in the world, raw materials entered at one end and finished cars emerged from the other. The innovation of the moving assembly line, was inspired by the 'dis-assembly' plants of the Chicago meat packing industry, reduced production time from twelve and a half hours, to just an hour and thirty-three minutes per car. Black was the only colour available because it was the only paint that would dry in the required production time. The continuous improvement of production methods, and economies of scale from larger and larger scale production, allowed Henry Ford to progressively lower the price of the Model T throughout its production run. It was far less expensive, smaller, and more austere than its hand-built pre-first world war contemporaries. The size of the Model T was arrived at, by making its track to the width of the ruts in the unsurfaced rural American roads of the time, ruts made by horse-drawn vehicles. It was specifically designed with a large degree of axle articulation, and a high ground clearance, to deal with these conditions effectively. It had an under stressed 177 cu in (2.9 L) engine. It set the template for American vehicles being larger than comparable vehicles in other countries, which would later on have economy cars scaled to their narrower roads with smaller engines.

In 1912 Edward G. Budd founded the Budd Company, which initially specialized in the manufacture of pressed-steel frames for automobiles. This built on his railroad experience. In 1899 he had taken his knowledge of pressed steel to the railroad industry. He worked with the Pullman Company on a contract for Pennsylvania Railroad, building the first all-steel railcar.

In 1913 in the UK, the 1018 cc "Bullnose" Morris Oxford was the first model launched by Morris Motors. Only 1302 were made. The Oxford was available as a two-seater, or van but the chassis was too short to allow four-seat bodies to be fitted. It made extensive use of bought in components, including many from the U.S. to reduce costs. The 1915-1919 Morris Cowley (about 1400 produced) powered by a new US Continental engine was a bigger stronger better finished version of the first Oxford. The post–First World War Oxford was a deluxe version of that, now made plainer, 1915-1919 Cowley. They were larger cars with 50% bigger engines than the 1913 Oxford. By 1925 Cowleys and Oxfords were 41 per cent of British private car production and limousine and landaulet bodies for 14/28 Oxfords were supplied ex-factory. Morris then added a commercial vehicle operation and bought Wolseley Motors the following year. Cecil Kimber, a Morris employee, founded MG (Morris Garages) aiming to sell more Morrises. After the Second World War Morris Motors, having swept in Riley, merged with the Austin Motor Company together forming the British Motor Corporation.

In 1913 the British Trojan company had its prototype ready for production. It had a two-stroke engine with four cylinders arranged in pairs, and each pair shared a common combustion chamber - a doubled-up version of what would later be called the "split-single" engine. The pistons in each pair drove the crankshaft together as they were coupled to it by a V-shaped connecting rod. For this arrangement to work, it is necessary for the connecting rod to flex slightly, which goes completely against normal practice. The claim was that each engine had only seven moving parts, four pistons, two connecting rods and a crankshaft. This was connected to a two-speed epicyclic gearbox, to simplify gear changing, and a chain to the rear wheels. Solid tyres were used, even though these were antiquated for car use, to prevent punctures and very long springs used to give some comfort. Before production could start war broke out and from 1914 to 1918, the company made tools and gauges for the war effort.

In 1914 Ford was producing half a million Model Ts a year, with a sale price of less than US$500. This was more than the rest of the U.S. auto industry combined and ten times the total national car production of 1908, the year of the cars launch. Also in that year Ford made headlines by increasing the minimum wage of his workers from $2.83 for a nine-hour day to $5.00 for an eight-hour day, to combat low workforce morale, and employee turnover problems because of the repetitive and stressful nature of working on the production line, and more radically, to turn his semi-skilled workers into potential customers.

The Ford Model T was the first automobile produced in many countries at the same time. It was the first 'World Car', since they were being produced in Canada and in Manchester, England starting in 1911 and were later assembled in Germany, Argentina, France, Spain, Denmark, Norway, Belgium, Brazil, Mexico, and Japan.

At the New York Motor Show in January 1915, William C. Durant the head of Chevrolet (and founder of GM), launched the Chevrolet Four-Ninety, a stripped-down version of the Series-H, to compete with Henry Ford's Model T, and went into production in June. To aim directly at Ford, Durant said the new car would be priced at US$490 (the source of its name), the same as the Model T touring. Its introductory price was US$550, however, although it was reduced to US$490 later when the electric starter and lights were made a US$60 option. Henry Ford responded by reducing the Model T to US$440.

In 1916 Edward G. Budd's first big order for the Budd Company was from the Dodge brothers, who purchased 70,000 bodies, mounting the steel bodies onto conventional chassis frames.

=== 1920s ===
During the 1920s Edward G. Budd's pressed steel bodies were fast replacing traditional coachbuilt bodies all around the world. These were fully closed roofed bodies, until this time open tourer bodies were the standard body on the market. Budd envisioned pushing his technology even further, and in 1924 he found another visionary in André Citroën. By 1934, they had developed the Citroën Traction Avant, the first unibody, pressed-steel automobile. Budd also pioneered the use of electric arc welding in automobile manufacturing. It would be the 1930s before this technology was generally applied to economy cars.

The cyclecar was an attempt in the period before 1922 in the post-First World War austerity period, as a form of "four-wheeled motorcycle", with all the benefits of a motorcycle and side-car, in a more stable package.

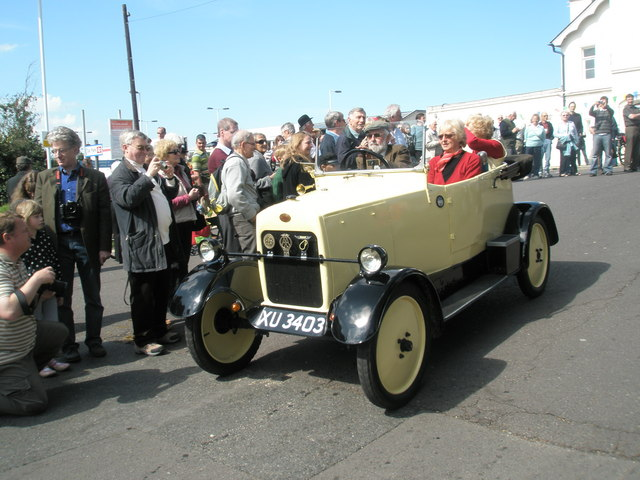
Trojan Utility Car

In 1920 Trojan in Britain made its first series of six cars from a works in Croydon and the final revised production version was shown at the 1922 London Motor Show. An agreement was reached with Leyland Motors to produce the cars at their Kingston upon Thames factory where work on reconditioning ex RAF wartime trucks was running down. This arrangement would continue until 1928 when Leyland wanted factory space for truck production. During the nearly seven years of the agreement 11,000 cars and 6700 vans were made. The car known as the Trojan Utility Car went onto the market at £230, reducing to £125 in 1925, the same as a Model T Ford. Nothing was conventional. Rather than a chassis the car had a punt shaped tray which housed the engine and transmission below the seats. This is a similar idea to the chassis-less design of the contemporary 1922 Italian Lancia Lambda luxury car. The transmission used a chain to drive the solid tyre shod wheels. The 1527-cc engine to the ingenious Hounsfield design was started by pulling a lever on the right of the driver. To prove how economical the car was to run, the company ran the slogan "Can you afford to walk?" and calculated that over 200 miles (320 km) it would cost more in shoes and socks than to cover the distance by Trojan car.

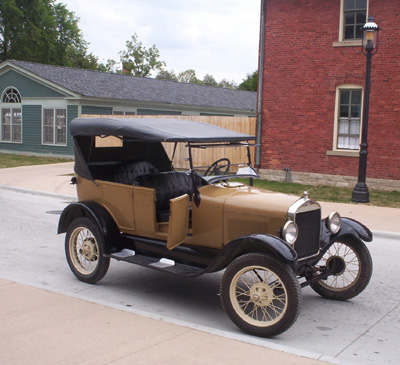
Late model Ford Model T used for giving tourist rides at Henry Ford Museum Greenfield Village

The astronomical success of the Model T accelerated after the First World War, and by the time Ford made his 10 millionth car, half of all cars in the world were Fords. It was so successful that Ford did not purchase any advertising between 1917 and 1923; more than 15 million Model Ts were manufactured, reaching a rate of 9,000 to 10,000 cars a day in 1925, or 2 million annually, more than any other model of its day, at a price of just $240. The need for constant reductions in price through the 1920s reflected increasing competition from newer designs for the relatively unchanged and increasingly obsolescent Model T.

In 1923 Chevrolet developed a new car to compete with the Model T, the Chevrolet Series M 'Copper-Cooled', air-cooled car, designed by General Motors engineer at AC Delco Charles Kettering, (who invented the points/condenser ignition system that was in use until the 1980s). It was a rare failure for him, due to uneven cooling of the inline four-cylinder engine.

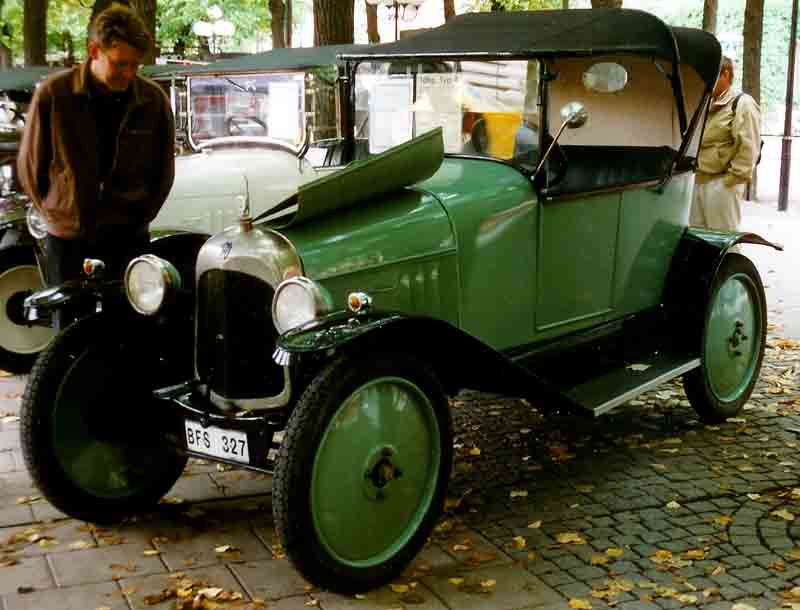
Citroën Type A Torpedo 1919

The most development of small economy cars occurred in Europe. There was less emphasis on long-distance automobile travel, a need for vehicles that could navigate narrow streets and alleys in towns and cities (many were unchanged since medieval times), and the narrow and winding roads commonly found in the European countryside. Ettore Bugatti designed a small car for Peugeot. The 1911 Peugeot Bébé Type 19. It had an 850 cc 4-cylinder engine. The Citroën Type A was the first car produced by Citroën from June 1919 to December 1921 in Paris. Citroën had been established to produce the double bevel gears that its logo resembles, but had ended the First World War with large production facilities, from the production of much needed artillery shells for the French army. Andre Citroën was a keen adopter of U.S. car manufacturing ideas and technology in the 1920s and 1930s. Andre Citroën re-equipped his factory as a scaled down version of the Ford River Rouge Plant, that he had visited in Detroit Michigan. It was advertised as "Europe's first mass production car." The Type A reached a production number of 24,093 vehicles. The Opel 4 PS, Germany's first 'peoples car', popularly known as the Opel Laubfrosch (Opel Treefrog), was a small two-seater car introduced by the then family owned auto maker Opel, early in 1924, which bore an uncanny resemblance to the little Torpedo Citroën 5 CV of 1922.

On an even smaller scale, European cars, such as the 747 cc Austin Seven, (which made cyclecars obsolete overnight.) The Austin 7 was considerably smaller than the Ford Model T. The wheelbase was only 1,905 millimetres (6 ft 3 in), and the track only 1,016 millimetres (40 in). Equally it was lighter - less than half the Ford's weight at 360 kilograms (794 lb). The engine required for adequate performance was therefore equally reduced and the 747 cubic centimetres (45.6 cu in) sidevalve was quite capable with a modest 7 kilowatts (10 bhp) output. It would also start to catch on in Japan during the same time period, as a Datsun Type 11 that may have been pirated, at the start of their own automobile industry. It was also produced as a BMW Dixi and BMW 3/15 in Germany, Rosengart in France with French styled bodywork, and by American Austin Car Company with American styling, (later American Bantam) in the U.S. It displaced the motorcycle and sidecar combination that was popular in Europe in the 1920s. It spawned a whole industry of 'specials' builders. Swallow Sidecars switched to making cars based on Austin Seven chassis during the 1920s, then made their own complete cars in the 1930s as SS. With the advent of Nazi Germany the company changed its name to Jaguar. The Seven continued to be produced until the late 1930s along with an updated and restyled closed body, known as the "Big Seven" until World War II, but still on the early 1920s running gear, but with a slightly enlarged chassis and widened track.

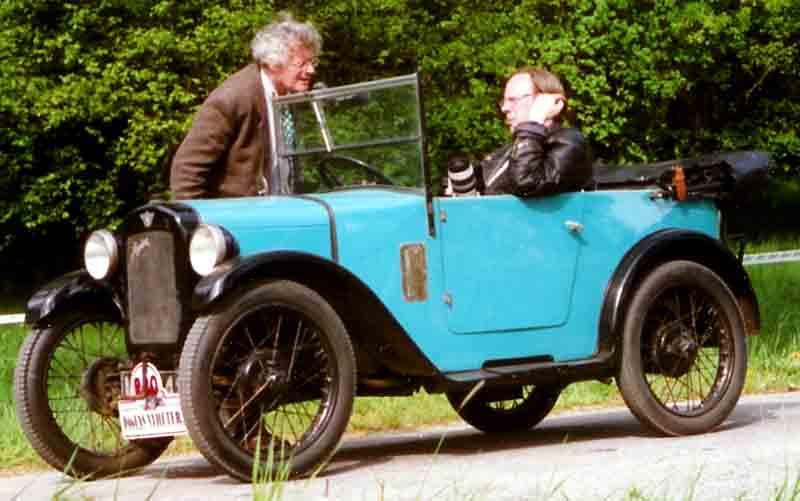
Austin 7 Chummy Tourer 1929

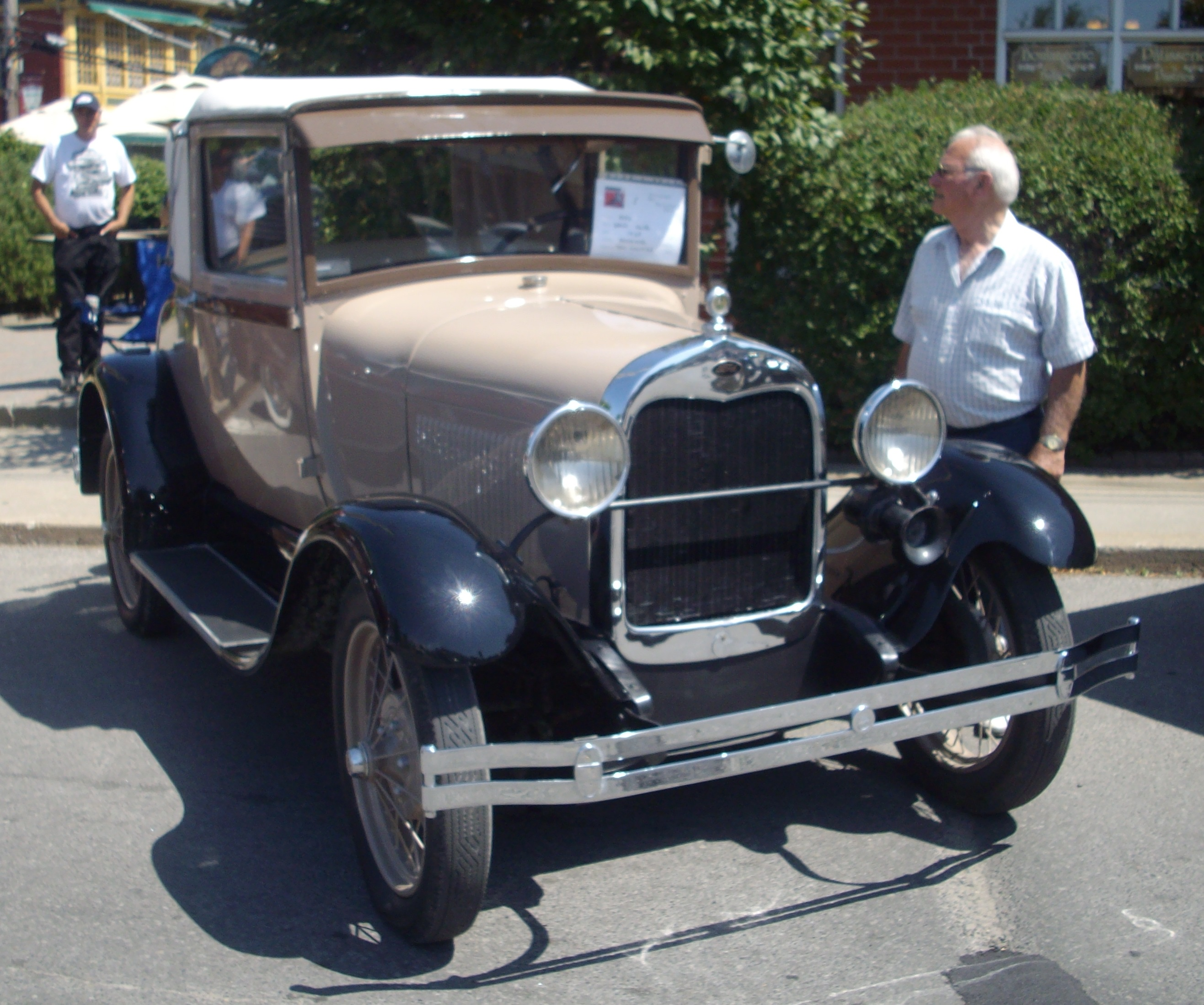
Ford A Tudor Sedan, 1929

In the late 1920s, General Motors finally overtook Ford, as the U.S. new car market doubled in size, and fragmented into niches on a wave of prosperity, with GM producing a range of cars to match. This included a Chevrolet economy car that was just an entry-level model for the range of cars. It was only a small part of the marketing strategy - "A car for every purse and purpose" of GM head Alfred P. Sloan. Harley Earl was appointed as head of the newly formed GM "Art and Color Section" in 1927. Harley Earl and Alfred P. Sloan implemented planned obsolescence and the annual model change to emphasise design as an engine for the success of the company's products. This moved cars from being utilitarian items to fashionable status symbols - that needed regular replacement "to keep up with the Joneses." Later in 1937, the Art and Color Section was renamed the Styling Section, and a few years afterward became one of the GM technical staff operations as the Styling Staff. It was funded by high-interest/low-regular-payments consumer credit, as was the 1920s boom in other consumer durable products. It marked the beginning of mass market consumerism, that had been enabled by the efficiency of mass production and the moving production line. Until this time, manufacturers of consumer goods were concerned, by the possibility that the market would be fulfilled and demand would dry up. The seller's market in new cars in the U.S. was over, as customers wanted choice. The 'one model' policy had nearly bankrupted the Ford Motor Company. By the end of production in 1927 it seemed outdated, and was replaced by the Model A. The Ford Model T was voted Car of the Century on December 18, 1999 in Las Vegas, Nevada.

In 1929 Chevrolet replaced the 171 cu in (2.8 L) straight-4 engine that dated from 1913, with the 194 cu in (3.2 L) Stovebolt Six engine that was to last until the 1960s as Chevrolet's base engine. A few years later Ford developed the Model 18 with the 221 cu in (3.6 L) flathead V8. The same car was available with a slightly reworked Model A engine, marketed until 1933 (in U.S.) as the Model B. In Europe, it remained in the Ford lineup, as the Ford V8 in Britain in the 1930s which was re-styled and relaunched as the post-war Ford Pilot. They were viewed as large cars in Europe. The 1932 Ford V8 (Model 18) coupe became the car of choice for post-war hot rodders. It was the first V8 engine in a low priced car, and along with the Chevrolet 6, showed how the U.S. was diverging from the rest of the world in its ideas about what constituted a basic economy car.

In 1928 Morris launched the first Morris Minor (1928) in Britain to compete with the Austin Seven. Also that year German motorcycle manufacturer DKW launched their first car, the P15, a rear-wheel-drive, wood-and-fabric bodied monocoque car, powered by a 600 cc inline two-cylinder two-stroke engine.

Also, in the 1920s, Ford (with the Model T in Manchester, England), General Motors (who took over Opel in Germany and Vauxhall in Britain), expanded into Europe. Most Ford and GM European cars, especially economy cars, were technologically conservative and all were rear-wheel-drive to a smaller European size, with improvements focused mainly on styling, (apart from the introduction of the 1935 monocoque Opel Olympia, and the Macpherson strut by Ford in the 1950s), until the late 1970s and early 1980s.

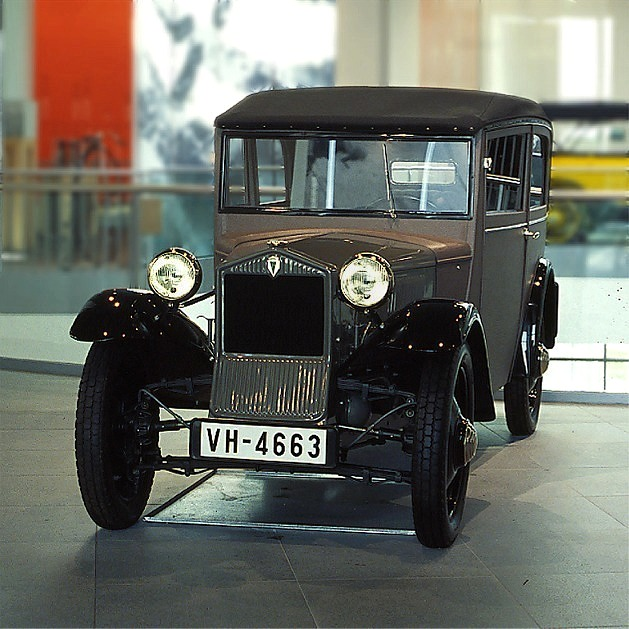
DKW F1 Saloon

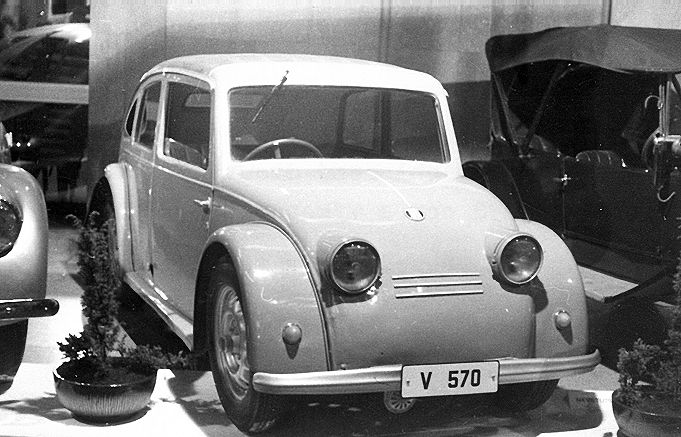
Tatra V570 1933

=== 1930s–1945 ===
In 1931 the DKW F1 was launched. This was the first successful mass-produced front-wheel drive car in the world. It was priced at 1,700 ℛ︁ℳ︁. (The British 1928-30 Alvis cars 'FWD' models had handling problems and only 150 were made. The British 1929 BSA was a three-wheel competitor to Morgan and the motorcycle combination market, the 1931 four-wheeler was very short-lived. The 1929 U.S. Cord L-29 having been seriously flawed, production ended at 4,429. The 1930 U.S. Ruxton made about 500, production lasted for only four months.) The F1 featured a front-engine, front-wheel-drive layout using a water-cooled 494 cc or 584 cc transverse two-cylinder two-stroke engine with chain drive. This was developed through the 1930s into the 1938 F8 model and the F9 that was not put into production because World War II started, 250,000 were made. By this time DKW had become the largest manufacturer of motorcycles in the world. Their two-stroke engine technology was to appear in the postwar products of Harley-Davidson, BSA, Trabant, Wartburg, Saab, Subaru, Piaggio, Puch, Kawasaki, Mitsubishi, Mazda, Daihatsu, Honda, and Suzuki. The DKW type of two stroke engine was replaced with four strokes in western economy cars by the 1960s, but lived on in stagnating and cash strapped Communist East Germany's Trabant and Wartburg and Communist Poland's FSO Syrena until the 1980s.

In the late 1920s in Germany, Josef Ganz independent car engineer/inventor and editor of Motor-Kritik magazine had been a fierce opponent of the status quo of car design. He became a consultant engineer to Adler in December 1930. In the first months of 1931, Ganz constructed a lightweight economy car or peoples car, prototype at Adler with a tubular chassis, a mid-mounted engine, and swing axle independent rear suspension. After completion in May 1931, Ganz nicknamed his new prototype Maikäfer (German for cockchafer) which is a species of beetle. In July 1931 he was also consultant engineer to BMW on the 1932-34 BMW 3/20 successor to the BMW 3/15 model. It featured transverse leaf independent front and rear suspension and an updated overhead-valve cylinder head version of the Austin 7 based engine. After a demonstration of the Adler Maikäfer by Ganz, the German Standard Fahrzeugfabrik company (unrelated to the British 'Standard' company), then purchased a license from Ganz to develop and build a small car according to his design. The prototype of this new model, which was to be called Standard Superior, was finished in 1932. It featured a tubular chassis, a mid-mounted engine, and independent wheel suspension with swing-axles at the rear. At about the same time from 1931, two years prior to Hitler's accession to power, Ferdinand Porsche founded Dr. Ing. h. c. F. Porsche GmbH - the Porsche company to offer motor vehicle development work and consulting. Together with Zündapp they developed the prototype Porsche Type 12 "Auto für Jedermann" ("car for everyone"), which was the first time the name "Volkswagen" was used. Porsche preferred a 4-cylinder flat engine, but Zündapp used a water-cooled 5-cylinder radial engine. In 1932 three prototypes were running but were not put into production. All three cars were lost during the war, the last in 1945 in Stuttgart during a bombing raid.

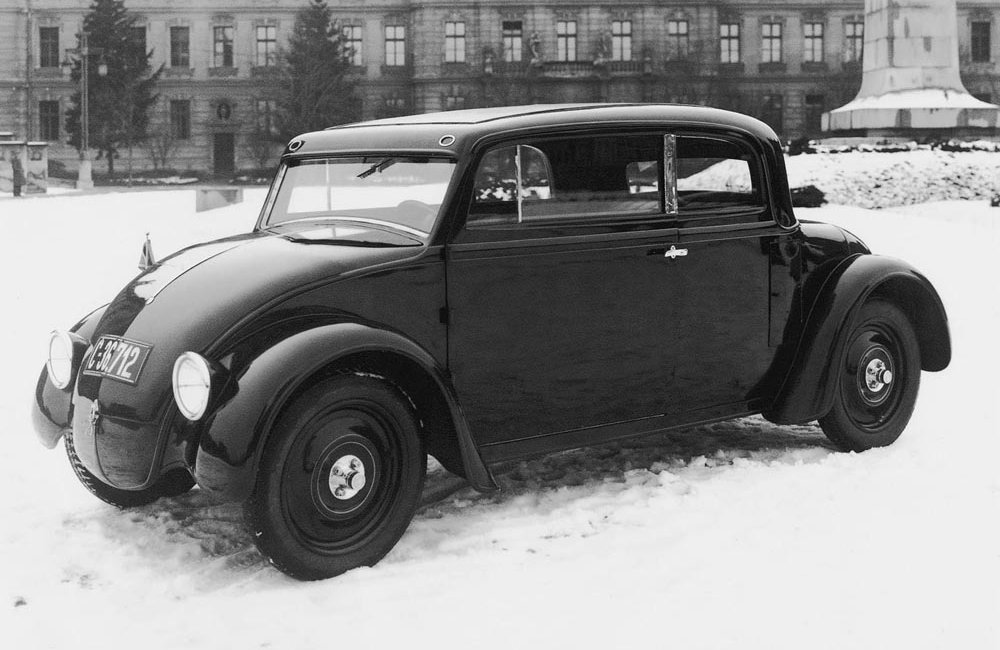
Škoda Š 932 prototype, 1932

In 1932 ASAP-Škoda in Mladá Boleslav Bohemia Czechoslovakia, produced a type Škoda 932 prototype of a streamlined 4-seater two-door car with a rear air-cooled flat-four engine designed by Karel Hrdlička and Vsevold Korolkov. This car's bodywork closely resembled the small car designs yet to come.

In Berlin in February 1933, the first production model of the Standard Superior was introduced at the IAMA (Internationale Automobil- und Motorradausstellung). It had a 396 cc 2-cylinder 2-stroke engine. Because of some criticism of the body design, not in the least by Josef Ganz in Motor-Kritik, it was followed in April 1933 by a slightly altered model. In November 1933, the Standard Fahrzeugfabrik introduced yet another new and improved model for 1934, which was slightly longer with one additional window on each side and had a small seat for children or as luggage space in the back. This car was advertised as the German Volkswagen. During the early 1930s German car manufacturers one by one adopted the progressive ideas published in Motor-Kritik since the 1920s. In the meantime in May 1933, the Jewish Josef Ganz was arrested by the Gestapo on trumped up charges of blackmail of the automotive industry, at the instigation of those that he had ferociously criticized. He was eventually released, but his career was systematically destroyed and his life endangered. He fled Germany in June 1934 – the same month Adolf Hitler gave Ferdinand Porsche the brief for designing a mass-producible car for a consumer price of 1,000 ℛ︁ℳ︁. Production of the Standard Superior ended in 1935. The Standard company was forbidden by the Nazis from using the term 'Volkswagen'.

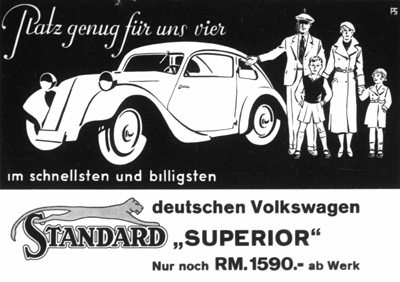
Brochure for the Standard Superior, 1934 – "Enough space for us four in the quickest and cheapest"

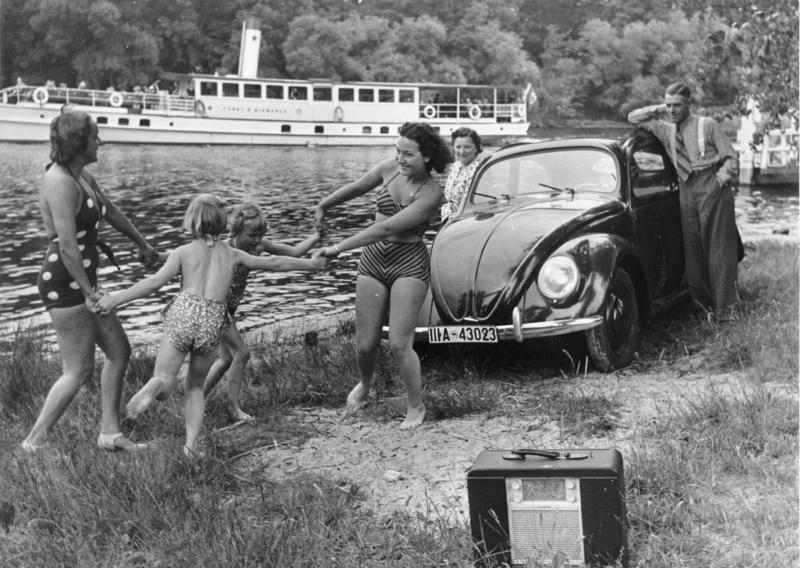
KdF Propaganda – "A family playing by a river with a KdF-VolksWagen and radio receiver" (see Volksempfänger)

The Volkswagen Beetle would be the longest-lasting icon of this 1930s era. Adolf Hitler admired the ideals exemplified by the Ford Model T, (even though he didn't drive himself), and sought the help of Ferdinand Porsche to create a 'peoples-car' ("volkswagen"), with the same ideals for the people of Germany. This car was to complement the new Autobahns that were to be built. They had been planned under the Weimar Republic, but he stole the credit for them. Many of the design ideas were plagiarised from the work of Hans Ledwinka, the Tatra T97 and Tatra V570 with the Czechoslovak Tatra (car) company. It was also suspiciously similar in many ways to the Josef Ganz–designed cars, it even looked very similar to the Mercedes-Benz 120H prototype of 1931. The Nazi Kraft durch Freude (German for Strength through Joy, abbreviated KdF) "KdF-Wagen" or "Strength through Joy - Car" project ground to a halt before serious production had started because of World War II. The KdF, was the Nazi state propaganda organisation to promote holiday and leisure activities of the population, approved of, and monitored by, the state. The 'price' of the free or subsidised activities was extensive Nazi ideological indoctrination. When the German car industry was unable to meet Hitler's demand that the Volkswagen be sold at 1,000 ℛ︁ℳ︁ or less, the project was taken over by the German Labour Front (Deutsche Arbeitsfront, DAF). This was the national labour organization of the Nazi Party, which replaced the various independent trade unions in Germany during the process of Gleichschaltung or Nazification. Now working for the DAF, Porsche built a new Volkswagen factory at Fallersleben, called "Stadt des KdF-Wagens bei Fallersleben" (Wolfsburg after 1945), at a huge cost which was partly met by raiding the DAF's accumulated assets and misappropriating the dues paid by DAF members. The Volkswagen was sold to German workers on an installment plan where buyers of the car made payments and posted stamps in a stamp-savings book, which when full, would be redeemed for the car. Due to the shift of wartime production, no consumer ever received a "Kdf-Wagen" (although after the war, Volkswagen did give some customers a DM 200 discount for their stamp-books). The project was not commercially viable and only government support was able to keep it afloat. The Beetle factory was primarily converted to produce the Kübelwagen (the German equivalent of the jeep). The few Beetles that were produced went to the diplomatic corps and military officials. After the war, the Volkswagen company would be founded to produce the car in the new democratic West Germany, where it would be a success.

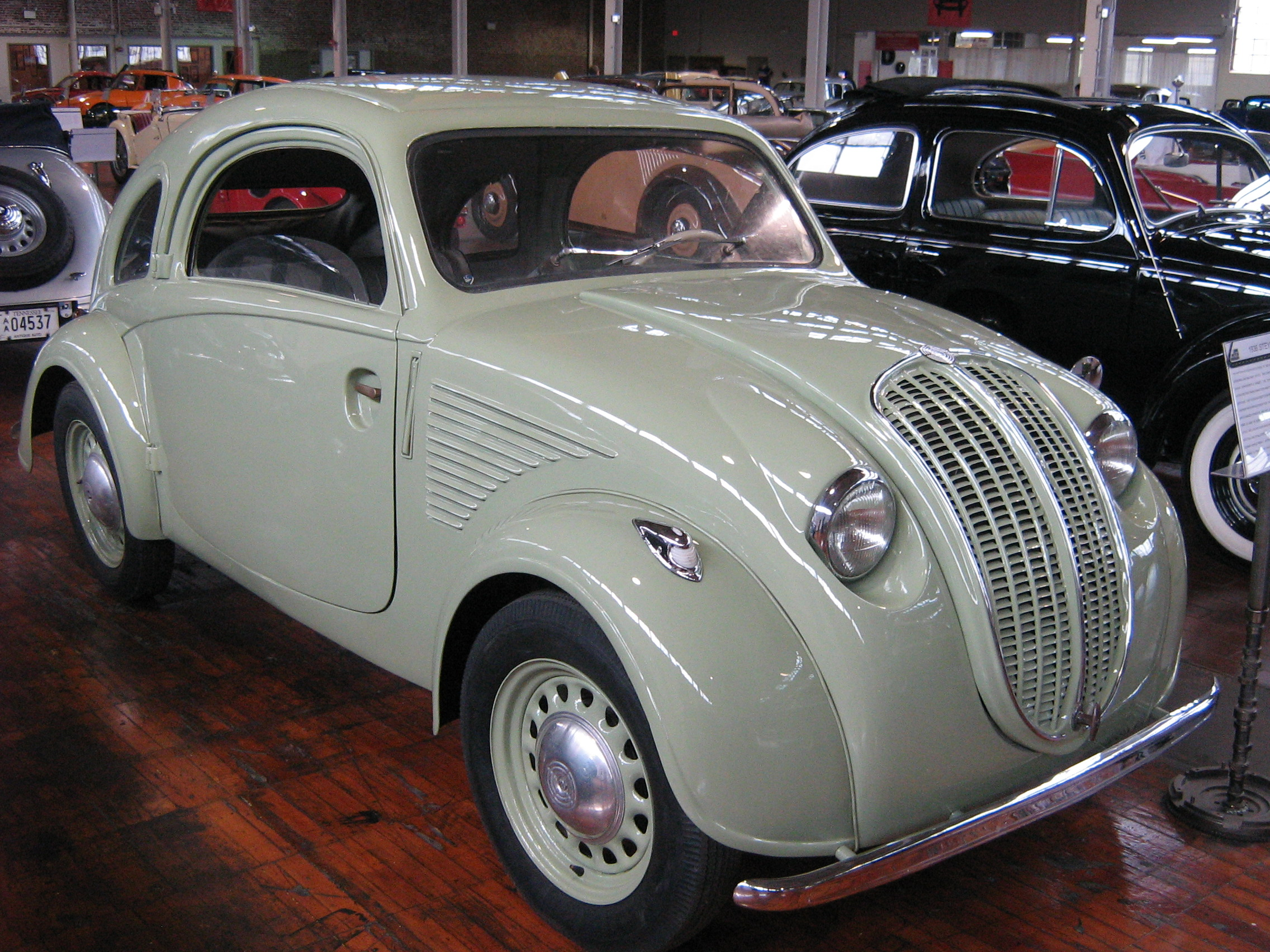
1936 Steyr 50 Baby

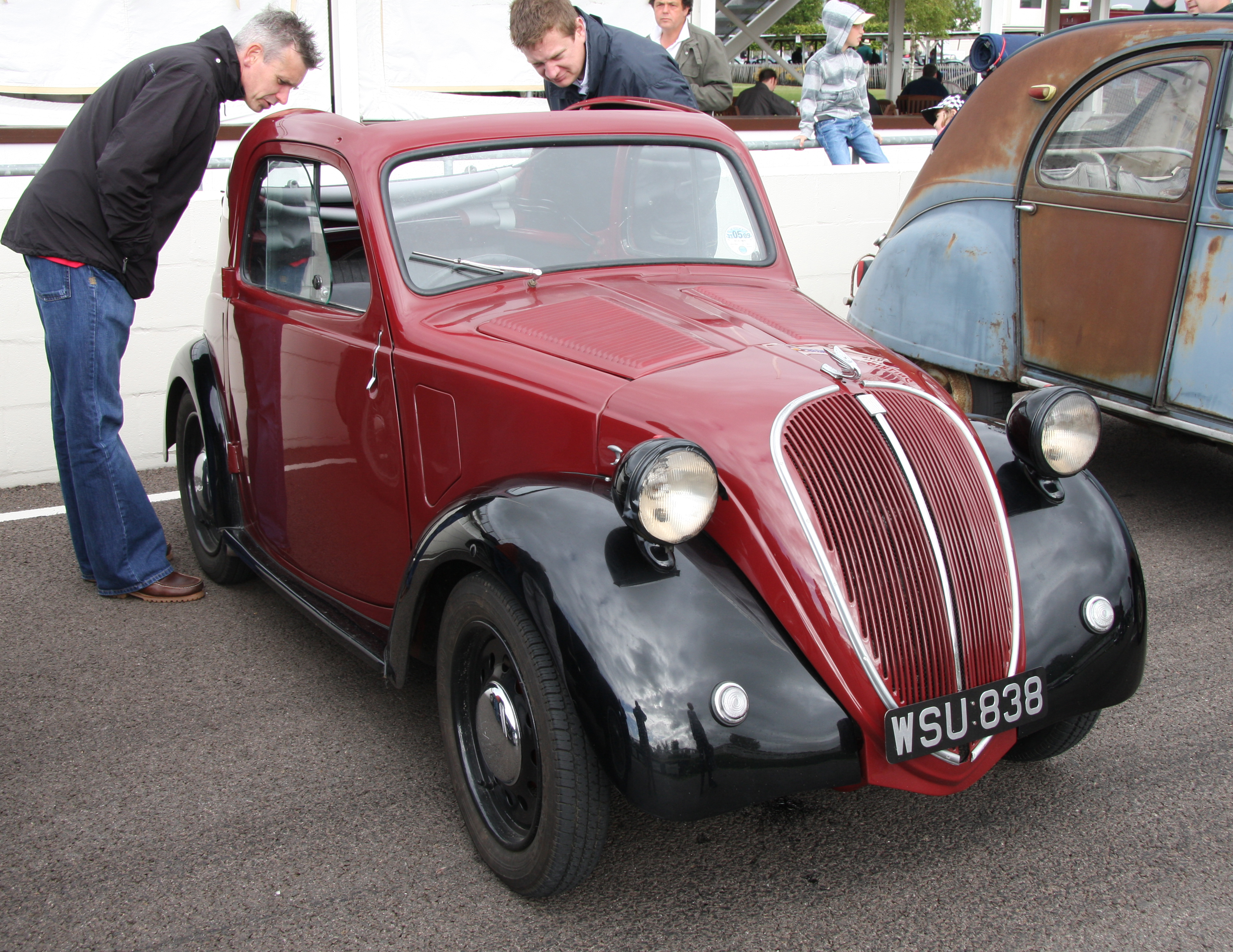
Fiat Topolino

From 1936 to 1955, Fiat in Italy produced the advanced and very compact FR layout Fiat 500 "Topolino" or "little mouse", the precursor of the 1950s Fiat 500, it was designed by Dante Giacosa. The inline four cylinder 569 cc 13 1/2 hp engine was placed right at the front of the chassis with the radiator behind it. This allowed for a sloping front and good legroom when combined with lowered seating. This also allowed Fiat to lower the roofline. Although nominally a two-seater more were often squeezed in behind the seats. Initially it had quarter elliptic leaf spring rear suspension, but with an axle locating trailing arm, that was upgraded to stronger semi-elliptic to cope with overloading by customers. The front suspension was independent and was used as the basis of the suspension of the first English Cooper racing cars in the 1940s that became successful in the 1950s. It had a four speed gearbox (when three was common) and all hydraulic brakes. It was a similar size to the Austin Seven but much more advanced. It was exported all over the world and produced at the NSU factory in Germany, Steyr-Puch in Austria and Simca in France. It was facelifted with American influenced 'full width styling' of the frontal panels after the war, with headlights integrated into the wings/fenders.

The Fiat 1100 was first introduced in 1937 as an updated version of the 508 "Balilla" (its real name was the 508C) with a look similar to the 1936 Fiat 500 "Topolino" and the larger 1500, with the typical late-thirties heart-shaped front grille, with styling by the emerging designer, Dante Giacosa. It was powered by a 1,089 cc four cylinder overhead-valve engine. Drive was to the rear wheels through a four-speed gearbox, and for the period, its comfort, handling, and performance were prodigious, making it "the only people's car that was also a driver's car".

The Steyr 50 streamlined small car was introduced in 1936 by the Austrian manufacturer Steyr-Puch. The car had a water-cooled four-cylinder boxer engine driving the rear wheels through a four-speed transmission. It had a similar engine and radiator layout as the Fiat Topolino that was launched at about the same time. To save room and weight a dynastarter was used, which doubled as the axle of the radiator fan. It was regarded as the "Austrian Peoples' Car" and was affectionately referred to as the Steyr "Baby". Professor Porsche had, despite rumors, not been involved in the design or production of the 50. Moreover, the little Steyr offered better seating and luggage space than Porsche's Volkswagen with shorter overall length, a large sheet metal sliding roof and was available with hydraulic brakes (instead of the early Volkswagens' cable-operated ones). In early 1938, the car was revised. It got a more powerful engine and a longer wheelbase. The new model was called the Steyr 55 and went on sale in 1940. A total of 13,000 Steyr "Babies" were sold. The production of Steyr cars was discontinued during World War II, after bombing of the factory. After the war, the factory was rebuilt and specialized in Austrian versions of the Fiat 500 and Fiat 1500. Today the Steyr factory produces the BMW X models for Europe.

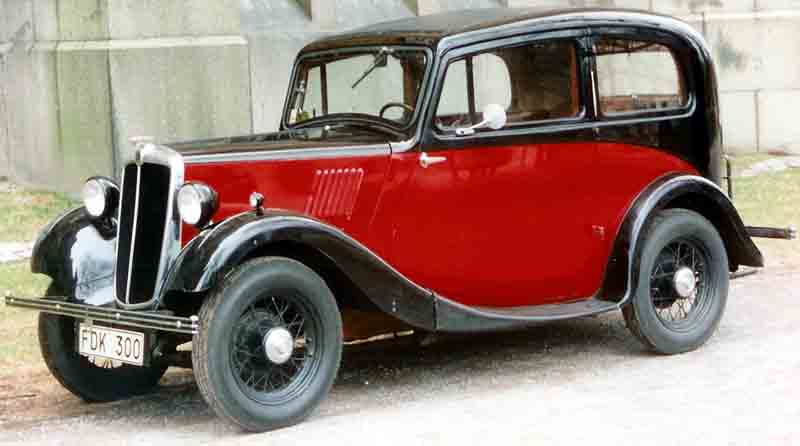
Morris 8 1936

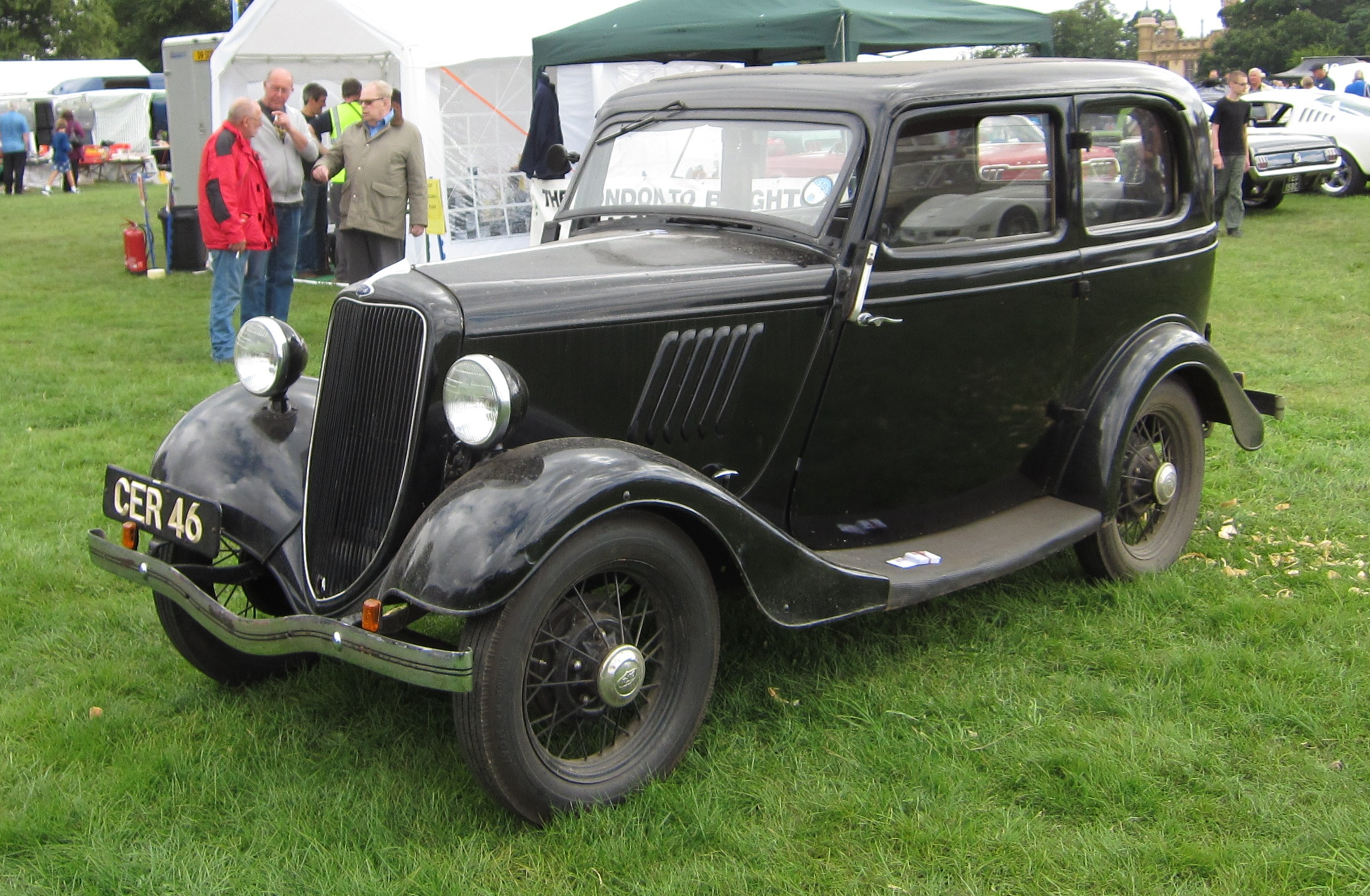
Ford 8 / Ford Model Y 933cc 1937

The pre-war European car market was not one market. Trade barriers fragmented it into national markets, apart from luxury cars where the extra cost of tariffs could actually make cars more exclusive and desirable. The only way for a car maker to enter another national market of a major European car making country, (and their colonial markets of the time), was to open factories there. For example, Citroën and Renault opened factories in England in this period. This situation only changed with the post-war growth of the EEC (European Community) and EFTA. The British RAC (Royal Automobile Club) horsepower taxation system had the secondary function of excluding foreign vehicles. It was specifically targeted at the Ford Model T, which the then government feared would wipe out the fledgling indigenous motor industry. It crippled car engine design in Britain in the inter-war period, causing British car makers to produce under-square, low revving, long stroke engines. It was abolished after World War II as part of the British export drive for desperately needed, hard foreign currency, because it made British cars uncompetitive internationally. The technologically conservative 1930s Morris Eight, Ford Eight (Ford Model Y which was related to the German Ford Köln), and Standard Eight (Standard, later became Triumph) were named after their RAC horsepower car tax rating. The Ford Model Y had replaced the Model A in Europe in 1932 and ran until 1937. It was a much smaller and lighter car, weighing one third less, with an engine two thirds smaller in capacity than the Model A. The basic Model Y 'Popular' was an important milestone in British economy cars, being the first steel-bodied four-seater saloon to sell for £100; previously the only four-wheeled car to sell for that price had been the two-seater tourer model of the Morris Minor. The Model Y was reworked into the more streamlined Ford 7Y for 1938-1939. This was restyled again into the 1939 launched Ford Anglia. Initial sales in Britain actually began in early 1940. Production was suspended in early 1942, and resumed in mid-1945. Production ceased in 1948 after a total of 55,807 had been built. The Anglia was restyled again in 1948. Including all production, 108,878 were built. When production as an Anglia ceased in October 1953, it continued as the extremely basic Ford Popular entry-level car until 1959. The Ford Prefect was a differently styled and slightly more upmarket version of the Anglia launched in October 1938 and remained in production until 1941, returning to the market in 1945. The car was face lifted in 1953 from its original perpendicular or sit-up-and-beg style to a more modern three-box structure. It was sold until 1961. The Anglia, Popular and Prefect sold well for a long time despite their old fashioned technology using transverse leaf springs and beam axles for front and rear suspension, side valve engines and only partly synchromeshed three speed gearboxes. They sold on price because of limited car supply on the used car market due to the Second World War, and new car market because of the British government's post war policy of exporting cars. The Morris Eight, introduced in 1935, was a deliberate close copy of the Ford and served as a lower cost, more profitable replacement for the 1928-vintage Morris Minor which had not achieved the hoped-for success. Prices for the Morris started at £112 and it offered more equipment than the Ford and a much more modern design than the ageing Austin Seven, which meant it became the UK's bestselling car by 1939.

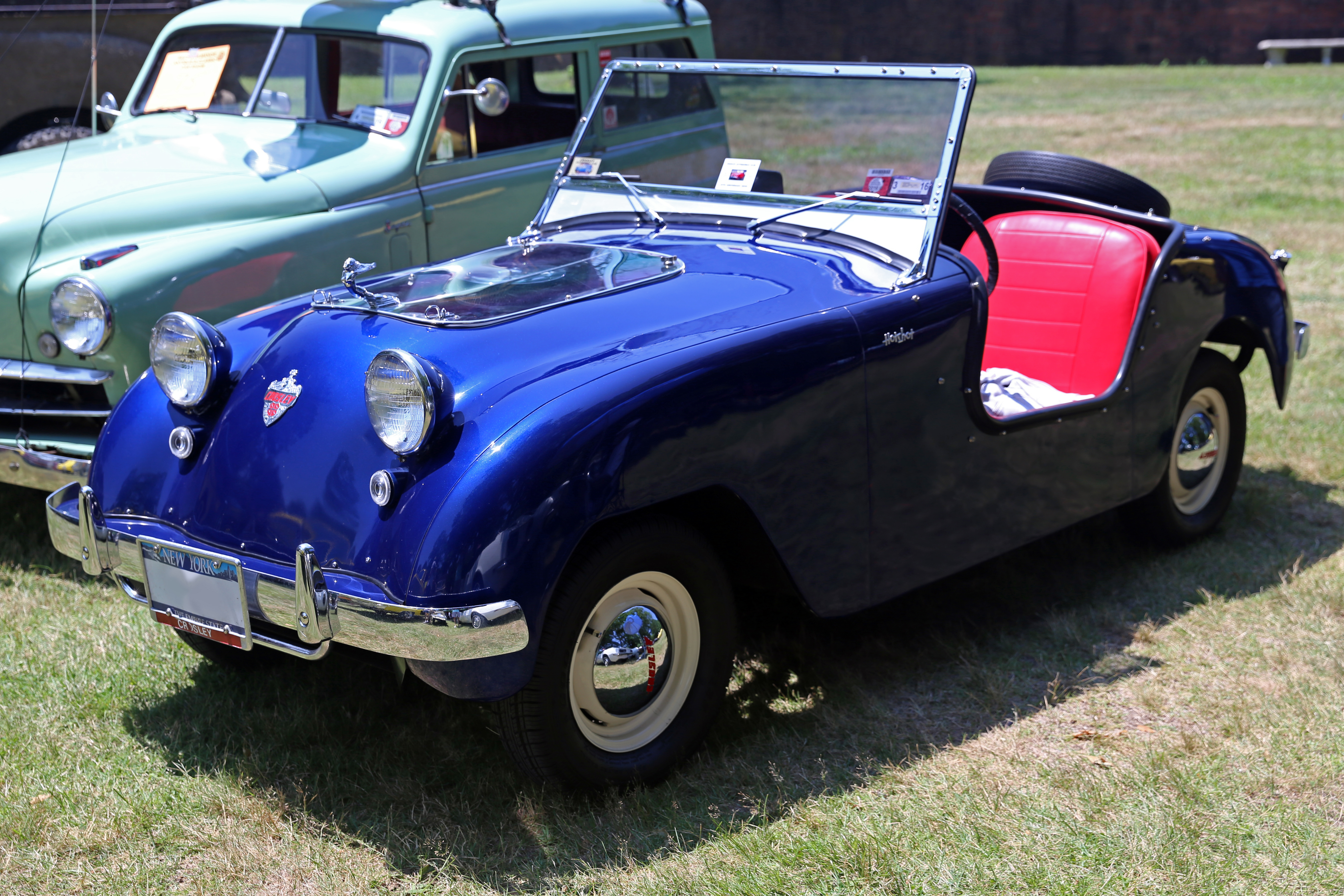
The 1949 Hotshot

U.S. Industrialist Powel Crosley Jr. with a long track record in diverse car products and other consumer products such as phonograph cabinets, radios, and home appliances with his company Crosley, started production of cars from 1939 (switching to war production in 1942-45) until 1952. They produced small economy cars of a European rather than American scale. These featured a variety of innovative in-house designed engines of less than one litre capacity. They were popular in the 1940s due to their high fuel economy during fuel rationing because of the war. There were a wide variety of two-door body styles; Sedan, Convertible Sedan, Coupe, Convertible Coupe, Covered Wagon, and Station Wagon. Also, there was a successful sports car, the Crosley Hotshot. The styling of 1951 Crosley Super Sport is very similar to the 1958 Frogeye/Bugeye Austin-Healey Sprite. Production peaked at 24,871 cars in 1948. Sales began to slip in 1949, as the post war American economy took off, and even adding the Crosley Hotshot and a combination farm tractor-Jeep-like vehicle called the Farm-O-Road in 1950, could not stop the decline. In 1952, only 1522 Crosley vehicles were sold. Production was shut down and the plant was sold to the General Tire and Rubber Company.

=== 1945–1960 ===
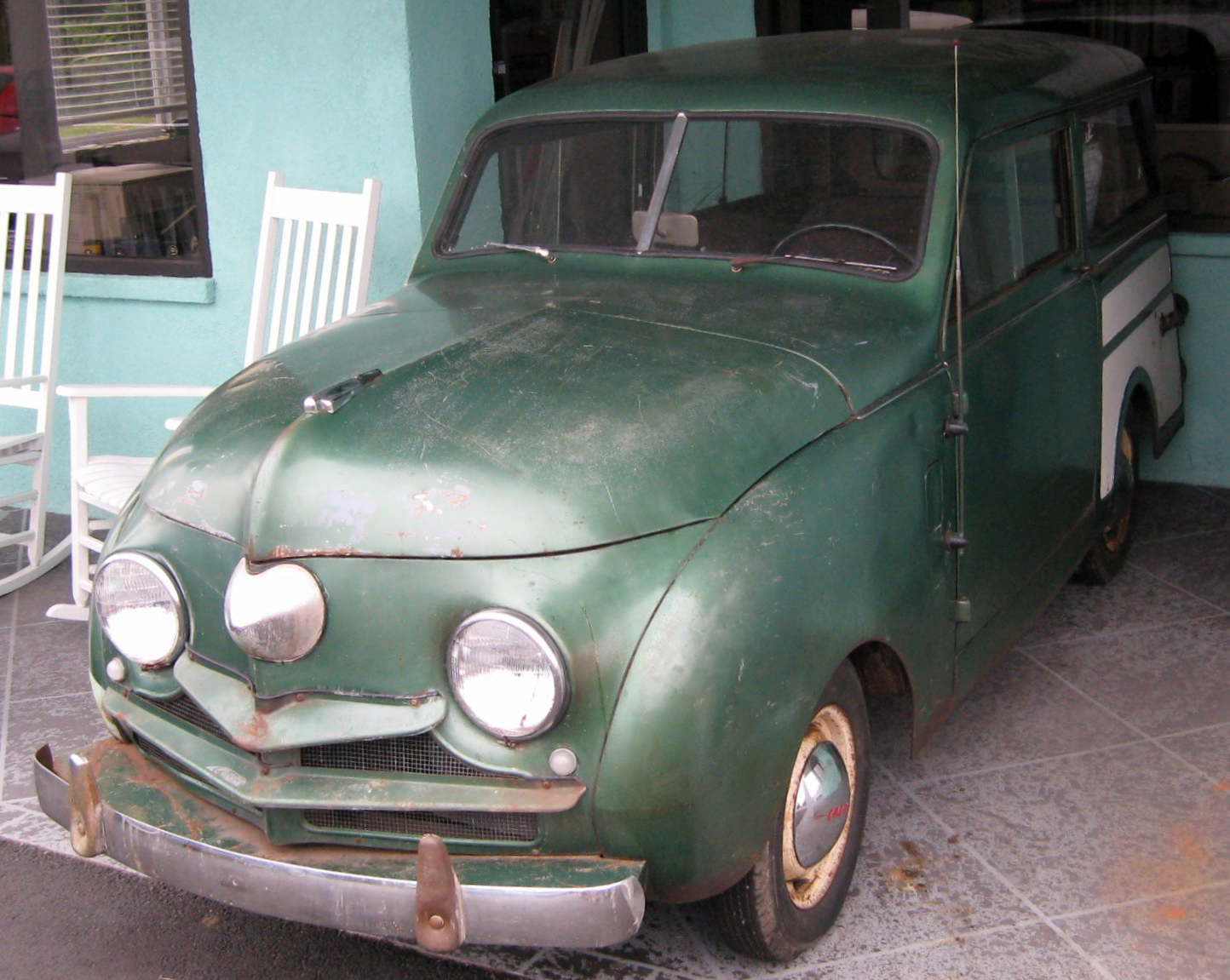
1948 Crosley station wagon

In anticipation of a repeat of the post First World War economic recession, GM started the "Chevrolet Cadet" project (a compact car intended to sell for less than US$1,000), that ran from 1945 to 1947, to extend the Chevrolet range downwards in the U.S. new car market. Chevrolet head of engineering Earle S. MacPherson was in charge of development. It had a unibody structure, an over-square over head valve engine, a strut-type front suspension, small-diameter road wheels, a three-speed gearbox, brake and clutch pedals suspended from the bulkhead rather than floor-mounted, and integrated fender/body styling. It was light and technically advanced, but GM's management cancelled it, stating that it was not economically viable - the anticipated post Second World War U.S. car market recession hadn't materialised. The MacPherson strut, probably the world's most common form of independent suspension, evolved in the GM Cadet project by combining long tubular shock absorbers with external coil springs, and locating them in tall towers that directed the vertical travel of the wheels and also formed the "king pin" or "swivel pin axis" around which the front wheels could turn. It was elegantly simple, with just three links holding the wheel in place - the strut itself, the single-piece transverse lower arm, and the anti-roll bar that doubled as a drag link for the wheel hub. MacPherson took his ideas to Ford instead. They were first used in the French 1948 Ford Vedette. Next in the 1950 British Ford Consul and Zephyr (British mid-size cars, the same size as the Cadet), which owed more to the Cadet than just the MacPherson strut suspension, and caused a sensation when they were launched. In 1953, a miniaturised economy car version, the Anglia 100E was launched in Britain. These early 1950s British Fords used styling elements from the U.S. 1949 Ford 'Shoebox'.

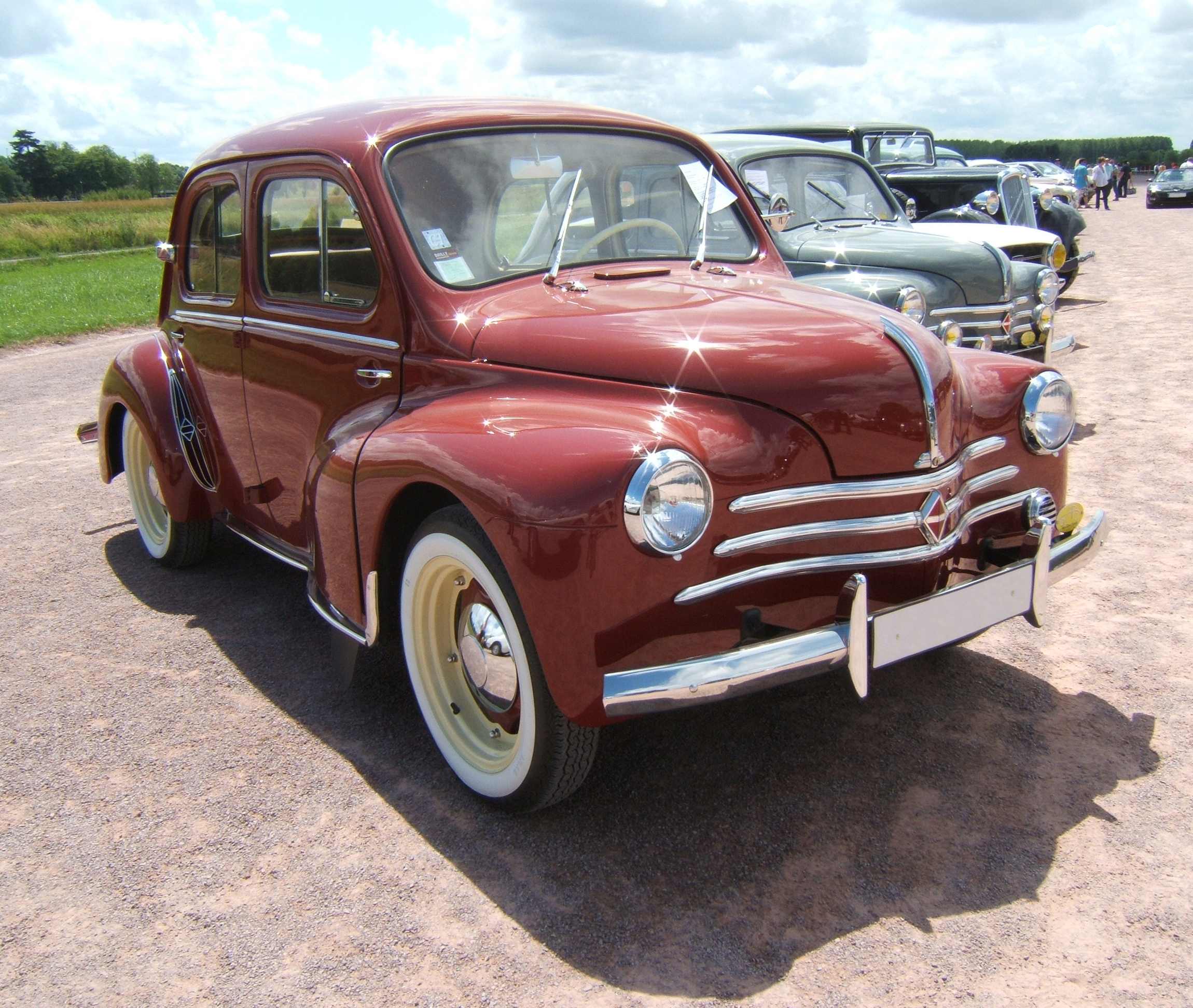
Renault 4CV

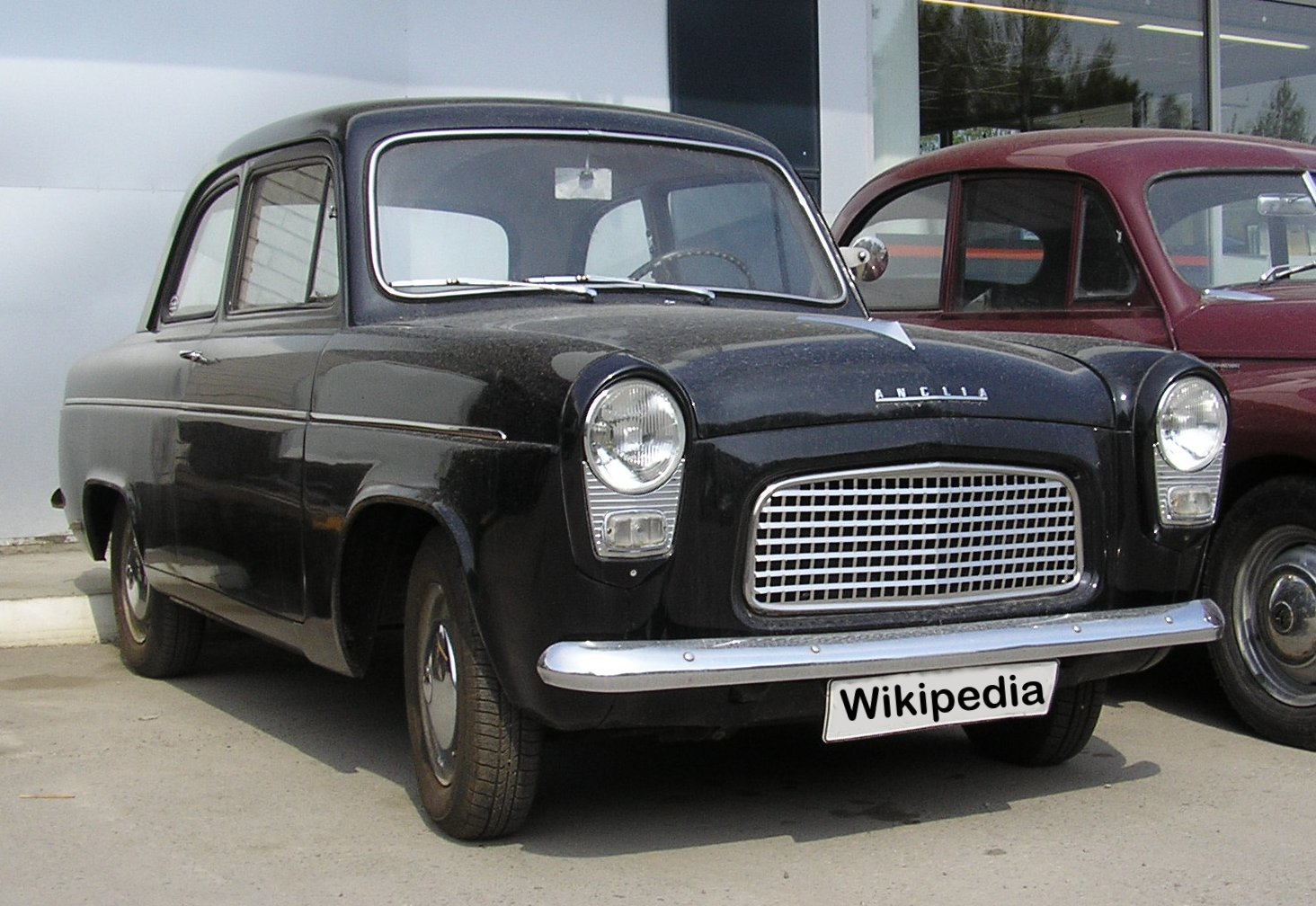
Ford Anglia 101E

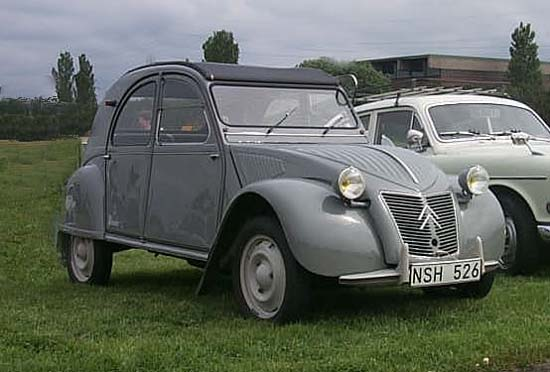
First generation "Ripple Bonnet" Citroën 2CV built 1949–1960

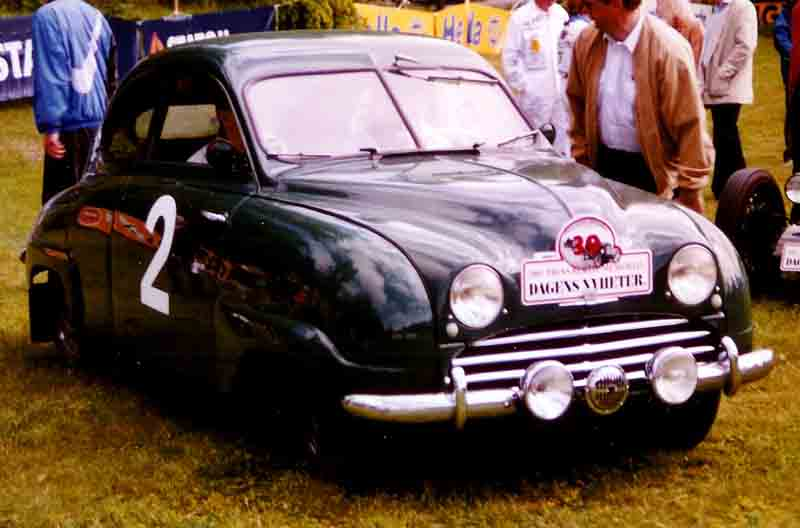
SAAB 92 1949

As Europe and Japan rebuilt from the war, their growing economies led to a steady increase in demand for cheap cars to 'motorise the masses'. Emerging technology allowed economy cars to become more sophisticated. Early post-war economy cars like the VW Beetle, Citroën 2CV, Renault 4CV, and Saab 92 looked extremely minimal; however, they were technologically more advanced than most conventional cars of the time.

The 4CV was designed covertly by Renault engineers during the World War II German occupation of France, when under strict orders to design and produce only commercial and military vehicles. Between 1941 and 1944, Renault was under the Technical Directorship of a francophile German installed former Daimler Benz engineer called Wilhelm von Urach who turned a blind eye to the small, economy car project suitable for the period of post war austerity. The design team went against the wishes of Louis Renault who in 1940 believed that post-war Renault should concentrate on mid-range cars. Only after a row in May 1941 did Louis Renault approve the project. In October 1944 after the liberation, Louis Renault who was imprisoned on charges of collaboration, died in suspicious circumstances. In January 1945, newly nationalised Renault had officially acquired a new boss, the former resistance hero Pierre Lefaucheux, (he had been acting administrator since September 1944). Lefaucheux had been arrested by the Gestapo in June 1944, and deported to Buchenwald concentration camp. The Gestapo transferred him to Metz for interrogation, but the city was deserted because of the advancing allied front, the Germans abandoned their prisoner. In November 1945 the French government invited Ferdinand Porsche to France looking to relocate the Volkswagen project as part of war reparations. On 15 December 1945, Porsche was invited to consult with Renault about the Renault 4CV. Lefaucheux was enraged that anyone should think the almost production-ready Renault 4CV was in any way inspired by the German Volkswagen, and that the politicians should presume to send Porsche to advise on it. The government insisted on nine meetings with Porsche which took place in rapid succession. Lefaucheux insisted that the meetings would have absolutely no influence on the design of the Renault 4CV, and Porsche cautiously went on record saying that the car would be ready for large scale production in a year. Lefaucheux was a man with contacts, as soon as the 4CV project meetings had taken place, Porsche was arrested in connection with war crimes allegations involving the use of forced labour including French in the Volkswagen plant in Germany. Ferdinand Porsche, despite never facing any sort of trial, spent the next twenty months in a Dijon jail. The 760 cc rear-mounted four-cylinder engine, three-speed manual transmission 4CV was launched at the 1946 Paris Motor Show and went on sale a year later. Volume production with the help of Marshall Plan aid money, was said to have commenced at the company's Parisian Boulogne-Billancourt plant a few weeks before the Paris Motor Show of October 1947, although the cars were in very short supply for the next year or so. On the 4CV's launch, it was nicknamed "La motte de beurre" (the lump of butter); this was due to the combination of its shape and the use of surplus paint from the German Army vehicles of Rommel's Afrika Korps, which were a sand-yellow color.

The VW featured a 1.1-litre, rear engined air-cooled 'boxer' flat four with rear-wheel drive, all round fully independent suspension, semi monocoque construction and the ability to cruise on the autobahn for long periods reliably. This cruising ability and engine durability was gained by high top gearing, and by restricting the engine breathing and performance to well below its maximum capability. Production was restarted after the war by the British Army Royal Electrical and Mechanical Engineers, under Major Ivan Hirst after it was dismissed as valueless for war reparations by the Western Allies. In 1948 Hirst recruited Heinrich Nordhoff to run Volkswagen GmbH and in 1949 ownership was handed over to the West German government. The Volkswagen Type 1 'Beetle' was to become the most popular single design in history. Its production surpassed The Ford Model T on February 17, 1972. It was withdrawn from the European market in 1978. The Volkswagen Beetle was an icon of the post-war West German reconstruction known as the Wirtschaftswunder.

The 375 cc Citroën 2CV had interconnected all round fully independent suspension, rack and pinion steering, radial tyres and front-wheel drive with an air-cooled flat twin engine and four-speed gearbox. It was some 10 to 15 MPG (Imperial) more fuel efficient than any other economy car of its time – but with restricted performance to match. It was designed to motorise rural communities where speed was not a requirement. The original design brief had been issued before the Second World War in the mid-1930s. It had been completely redesigned three times, as its market and materials costs had changed drastically during its development period. Engine size increased over time; from 1970 it was a still tiny 602 cc. It was in production until 1990.

The Saab 92 had a transversely mounted, water-cooled two-cylinder, two-stroke based on a DKW design, driving the front wheels. It had aircraft derived monocoque construction, with an aerodynamic (drag coefficient) value of 0.30 – not bettered until the 1980s. It was later developed into the Saab 93, Saab 95, and Saab 96. It was produced until 1980, switching to a V4 four stroke engine in the 1960s. The mechanicals were used in the Saab Sonett sports cars.

Also in the immediate postwar period, the monocoque FR layout Morris Minor was launched in 1948. To reduce costs it initially reused the pre-war side-valve 918 cubic centimetres (56.0 cu in) Morris 8 engine instead of an intended flat-four. Later, after the 1952 formation of British Motor Corporation it had the Austin designed 948cc and later 1098cc OHV BMC A-Series engine. It had a strong emphasis on good packaging and roadholding, with independent front suspension and rack and pinion steering, and American influenced styling. It was produced in different body styles including a 2-door and 4-door saloon, a 2-door convertible, a 'woody' estate car / station wagon, a van with a rear box and a pick-up truck. 1.3 million had been built by the end of production in 1971. It was designed by Alec Issigonis.

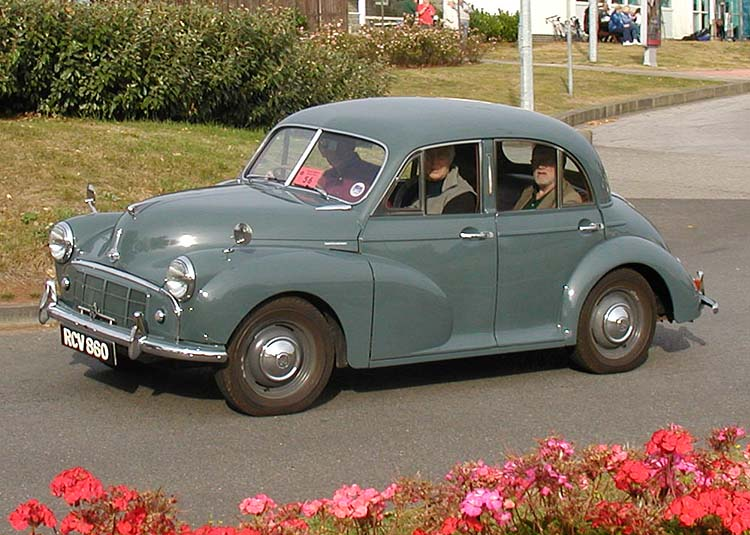
1953 Morris Minor

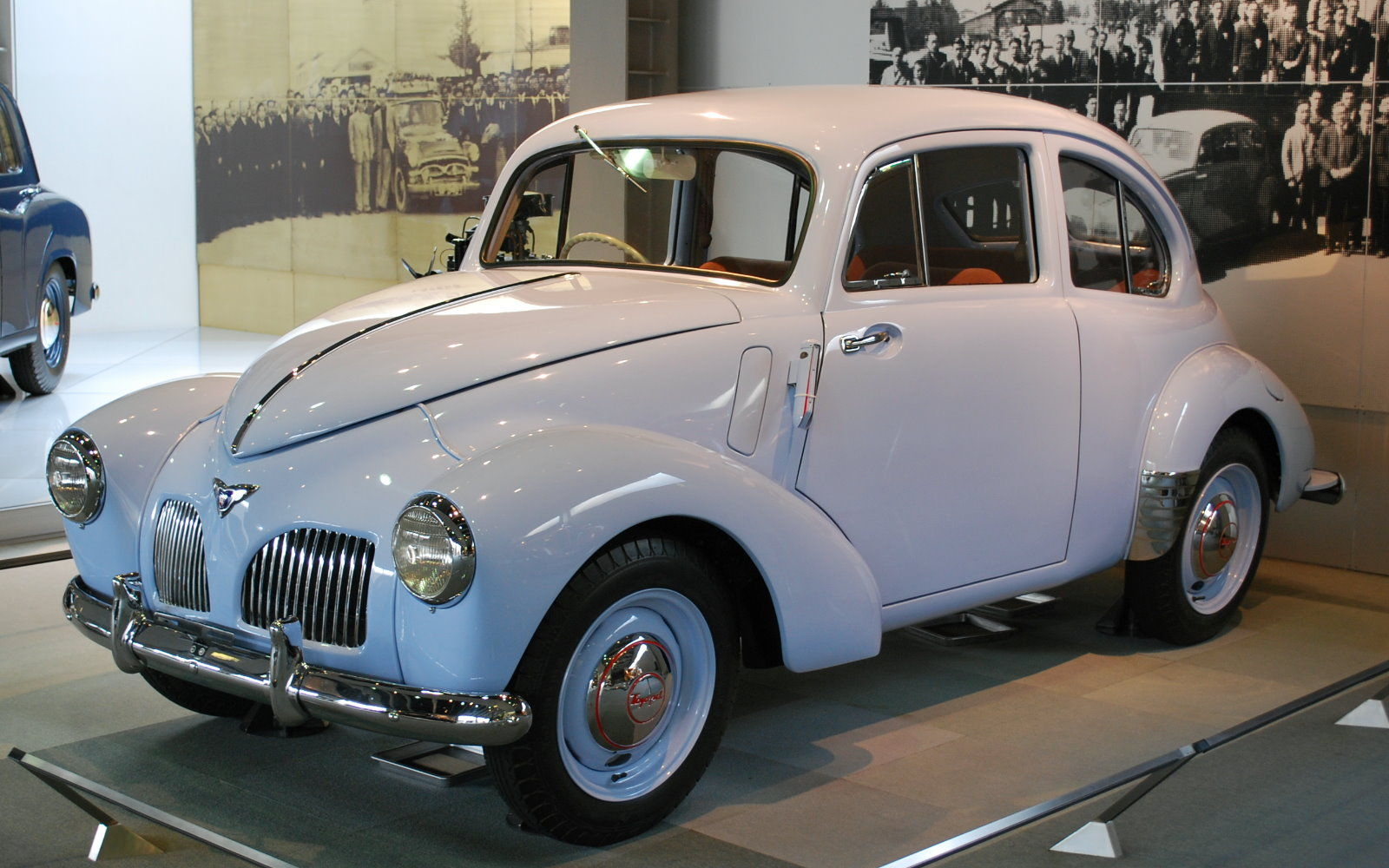
1947 Toyota Toyopet Model SA

The 1947 FR layout Toyota SA was Toyota's first true post war design. Although permission to begin full production of passenger cars in Japan was not granted until 1949, limited numbers of cars were permitted to be built from 1947, and the Toyota SA was one such car. It had a 4-cylinder engine, 4-wheel independent suspension and a smaller, aerodynamic body. The project was driven by Kiichiro Toyoda, but most of the design work was done by Kazuo Kumabe. The two-door body was aerodynamic in a style similar to the Volkswagen Beetle. The doors were hinged at the rear (often called suicide doors). The front window was a single pane of flat glass with a single wiper mounted above the driver. Only right hand drive was offered. Toyota engineers (including Dr Kumabe) had visited Germany before World War II and had studied Porsche and Volkswagen designs (independent suspension, aerodynamic bodies, backbone chassis, rear-mounted air-cooled engines, economical production cost). Many Japanese companies had ties with Germany during the war years. But unlike other Japanese car firms Toyota did not partner with Western companies after the war, so it was free to use German designs. Many features of the prototype Beetle were subsequently put into the SA, although the Beetle's rear-mounted air-cooled engine feature was not used. Later on, Toyota revisited the economic principles exemplified by the Beetle when designing the 1950s successors to the SA and the later Publica and Corolla.

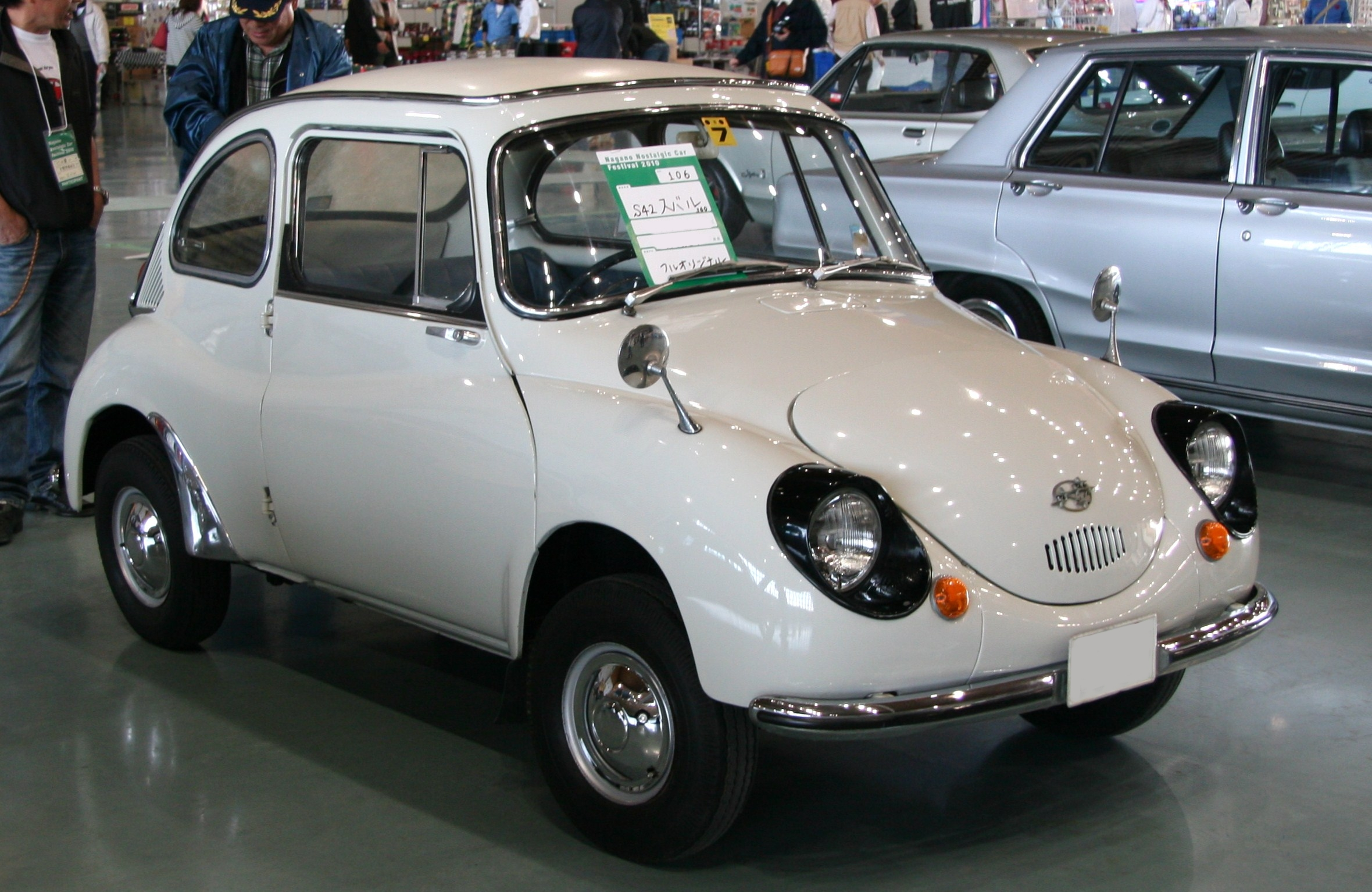
1967 Subaru 360

In the post war austerity of the late 1940s, when most of the Japanese population could not afford a car, but could afford a motorcycle, the Japanese codified a legal standard for extremely economical small cars, known as the keicar. The aim was to promote the growth of the car industry, as well as to offer an alternative delivery method to small business and shop owners. Originally limited to a mere 150 cc (100 cc for two-strokes) in 1949, dimensions and engine size limitations were gradually increased (in 1950, 1951, and 1955) to tempt more manufacturers to produce kei cars. It wasn't until the 1955 change to 360 cc as the upper limit for two-strokes as well as four-strokes that the class really began taking off, with cars from Suzuki Suzulight (front-wheel drive based on the German Lloyd with a DKW type engine) and then Subaru 360, finally able to fill people's need for basic transportation without being too severely compromised. Early generation keicars on the market were mostly rear-engined, rear drive RR layout cars. From the end of the 1960s Keicars switched to front-engined, front-wheel-drive FF layout. This market has thrived ever since, with the cars increasing in size and engine capacity, including sports cars such as the Honda Beat and Suzuki Cappuccino, and even miniaturised MPVs.

In 1953, in Japan Hino entered the private car market, by manufacturing the Renault 4CV under licence. Also, in 1953 the Fiat 1100 in Italy was completely redesigned as a compact four-door sedan, with a modern monocoque bodywork and integrated front lights.

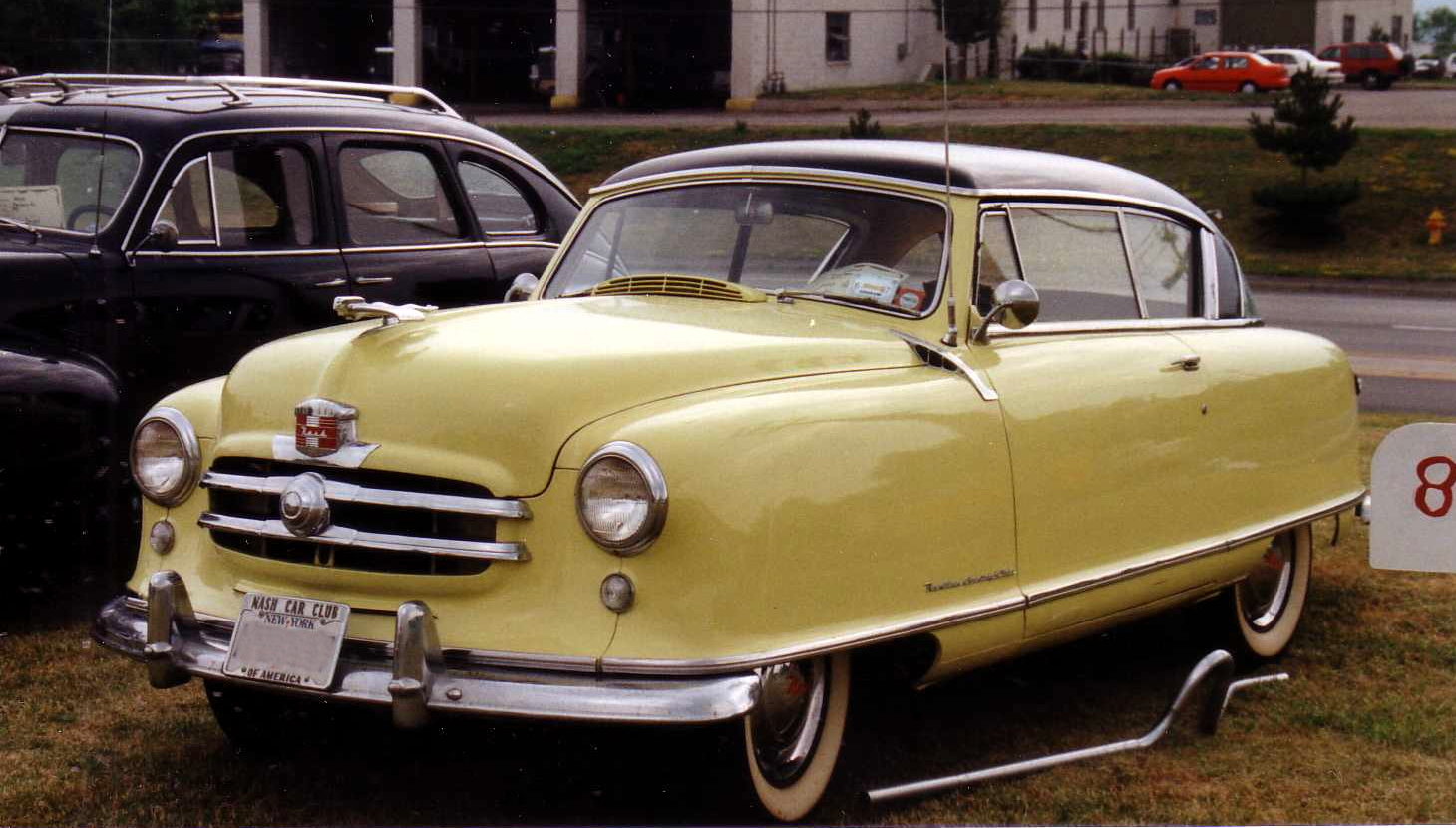
1951 Nash Rambler 2-door hardtop

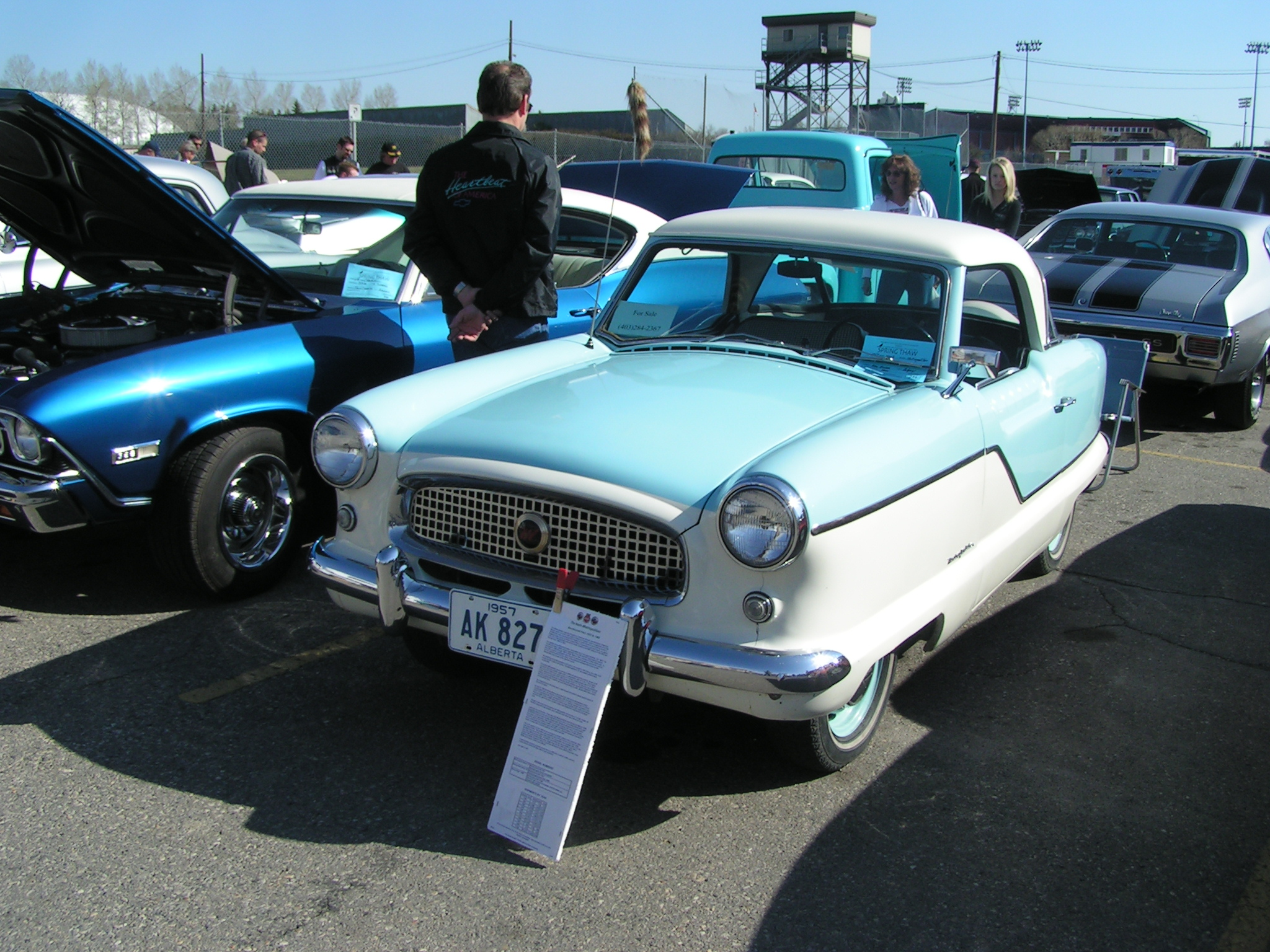
Nash Metropolitan

While economy cars flourished in Europe and later Japan, the booming postwar American economy combined with the emergence of the suburban and interstate highways in that country led to slow acceptance of small cars. Brief economic recessions saw interest in economical cars wax and wane. During the early 1950s, the independent lower volume American auto manufacturers launched new 'small' cars. They were designed to be smaller than contemporary American cars, but would still have mainstream appeal, because they could still accommodate five passengers comfortably with conventional engineering and FR layout, establishing the American sized 'Compact car'. Nash Motors launched the Nash Rambler and Kaiser-Frazer introduced the Henry J in 1950. Willys-Overland (the designers of the Second World War Jeep MB) the Willys Aero in 1952, and Hudson the 1953 Hudson Jet. This niche market avoiding competition with the 'Big Three' of GM, Ford and Chrysler was not large enough to sustain all these competing models. They were priced too near the cost of a base model full sized car from the big three, that in the 1950s had a price war. US Fuel prices during this period were very low and the maintenance costs of the compacts were almost as much as full sized cars, so total running cost were not that much cheaper. Only the Nash Rambler made it to a second generation. The losses caused to the other car makers initiated the succession of mergers that eventually resulted in the American Motors Corporation (AMC). Nash also contracted with British Motor Corporation to build the American designed Metropolitan using existing BMC mechanical components, (the 1.5 Liter engine is a BMC B-Series engine also used in larger sizes in the MG MGA and MG MGB). Imported cars began to appear on the U.S. market during this time to satisfy the demands for true economy cars. An initial late 1940s–early 1950s success in a small way, was the monocoque Morris Minor launched in 1948, with its miniaturized Chevrolet styling. It was underpowered for the long distance roads of the U.S. and especially the freeways that were starting to spread across the country in the 1950s. The first British Motorway did not open until 1959. BMC preferred to develop the higher profit margin MGs for the American market and also worked with Nash and so passed on the opportunity. From the mid-1950s the Volkswagen Beetle using clever and innovative advertising and capitalising on its very high build quality, durability and reliability, was a spectacular success. Having been designed for cruising the autobahns, freeways were no problem for it. It disproved the scepticism of American buyers as to the usefulness of, by their standards, such small cars. In 1955 VW launched the Beetle-based Italian styled Karmann Ghia coupé, that was developed from a 1953 concept car. Production doubled soon after its introduction, becoming the car most imported into the U.S., with more than 445,000 imported. Initially the stylish Renault Dauphine derived from the Renault 4CV, looked like it would follow the VWs footsteps, but then was a failure due to mechanical breakdowns and body corrosion. This failure on the U.S. market in the late 1950s, may have harmed the acceptance of small cars generally in America.

In 1955, the Japanese Ministry of International Trade and Industry set a goal to all Japanese makers to create what was called a "national car" that was larger than the kei car. This influenced Japanese automobile manufacturers to focus their product development efforts for the smaller kei cars, or the larger "national cars". The concept stipulated that the vehicle be able to maintain a maximum speed over 100 km/h (62 mph), weigh below 400 kg (882 lbs), fuel consumption at 30 km/L (85 mpg_{‑imp}; 71 mpg_{‑US}) or more, at an average speed of 60 km/h (37 mph) on a level road, and not require maintenance or significant service for at least 100,000 km (62,000 mi). This established a "compact car" class, that is by far the most popular in Japan due to tax benefits stipulated by Japanese government regulations. One of the first compact cars that met those requirements was the FR layout Toyota Publica with a flat twin engine, and the RR layout Mitsubishi 500. The Publica and the Mitsubishi 500 were essentially "kei cars" with engines larger than regulations permitted at the time.

In the late 1950s the DDR German Democratic Republic produced its 'peoples' car'. The Trabant sold 3 million vehicles in thirty years due to its communist captive market. It had a transverse two-cylinder air-cooled two-stroke engine and front-wheel drive, using DKW technology.

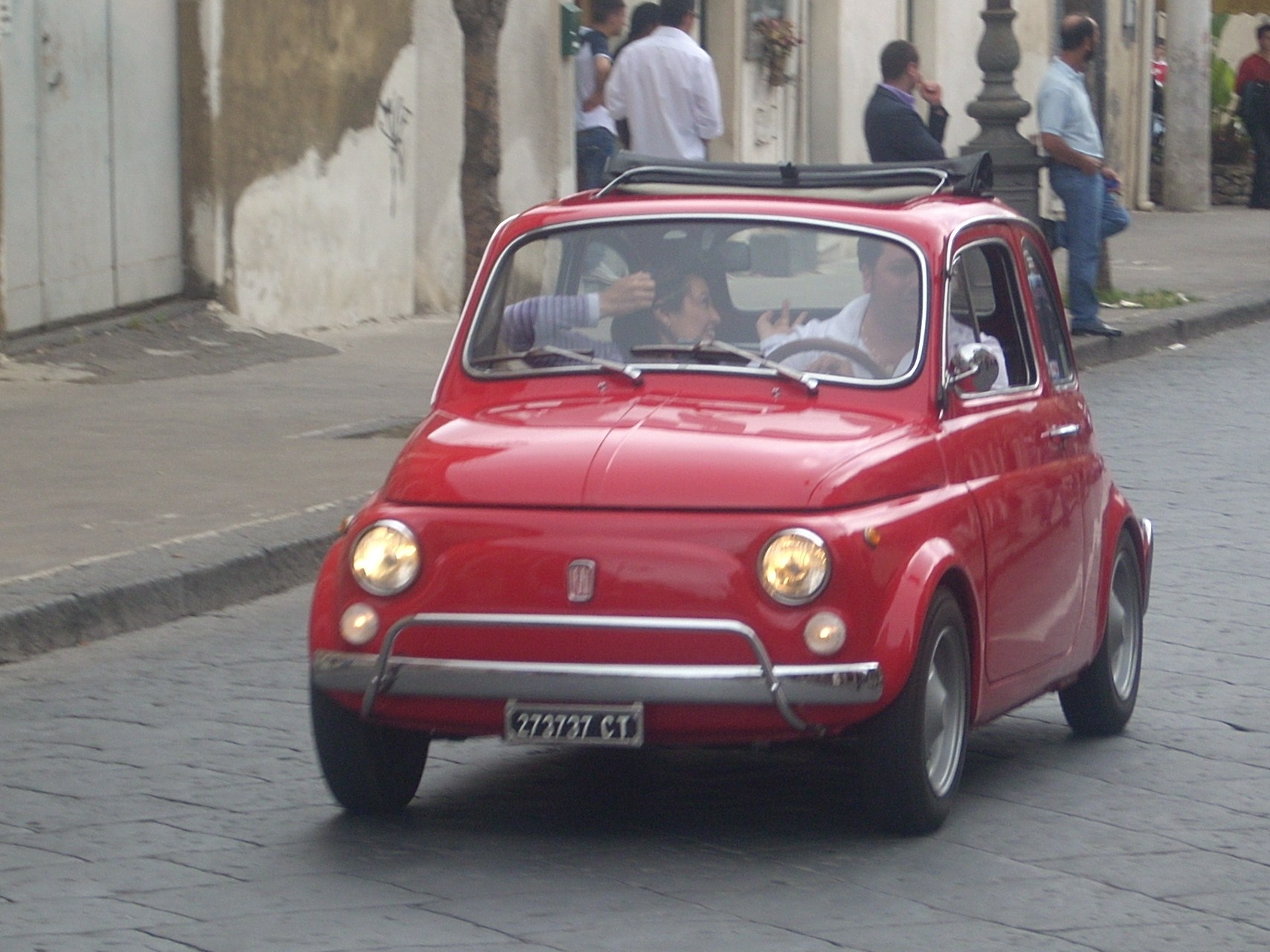
Restored original Fiat 500 in a street race in Sicily, Italy

In 1957, Fiat in Italy launched the 479 cc 'Nuovo' Fiat 500 designed by Dante Giacosa with frontal styling by Claus Luthe. It was the first real city car. It had a rear-mounted air-cooled vertical twin engine, and all round independent suspension. Its target market was Italian scooter riders who had settled down and had a young family in the post war baby boom, and needed their first car. It was also produced in Austria as the Puch 500. Fiat had also launched the larger 1955 Fiat 600 with a similar layout but with a water-cooled in-line four-cylinder engine, it even had a six-seater people carrier / MPV / mini-van version called the 'Multipla', even though it was about the same size as a modern supermini.

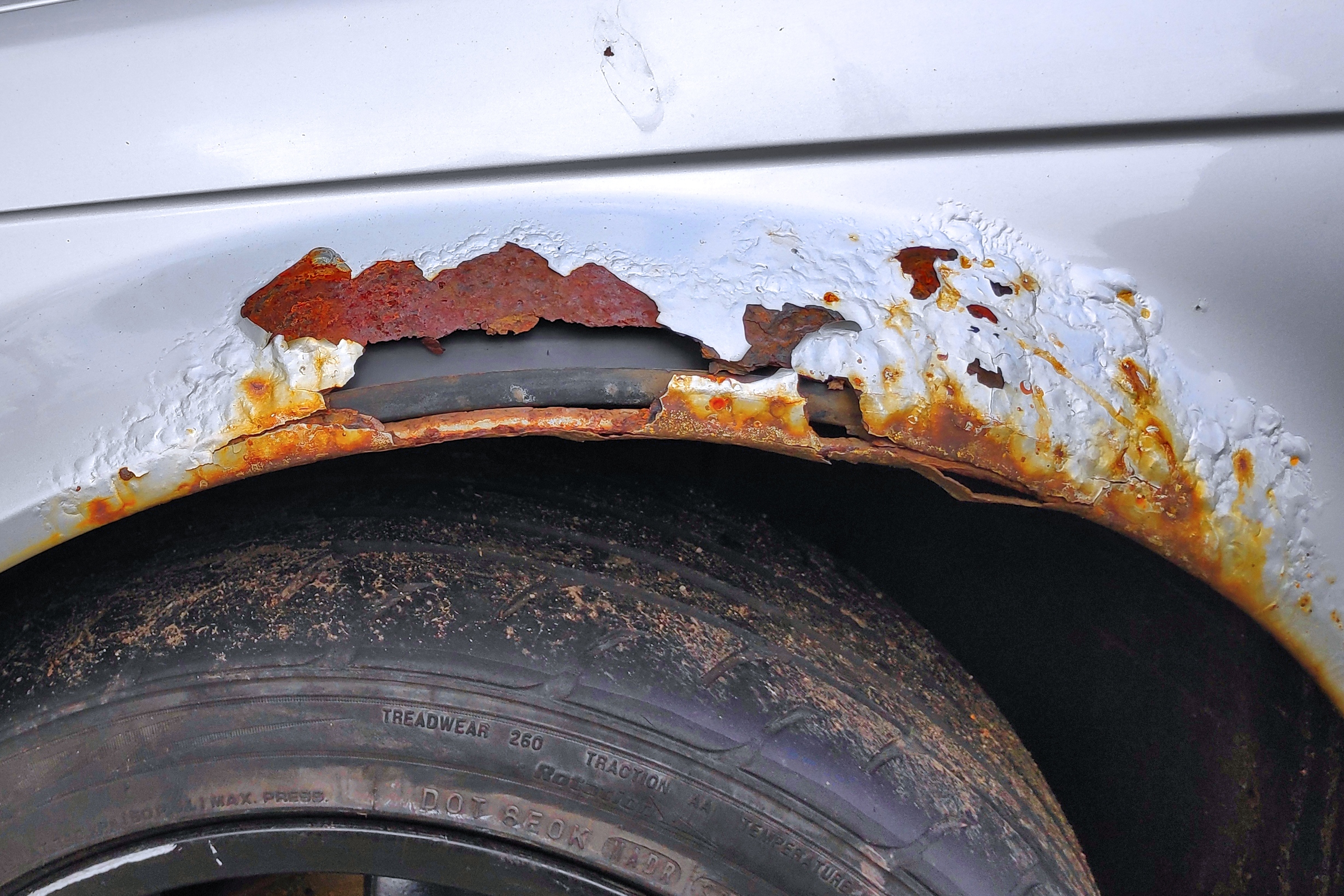
Car body corrosion

Car body corrosion was a particular problem from the 1950s to the 1980s when cars moved to monocoque or uni-body construction (starting from the 1930s), from a separate Body-on-frame chassis made from thick steel. This relied on the shaped body panels and box sections, like sills/rockers, providing the integrity of the body-shell rather than a separate frame (vehicle) for strength. A light car was a fast and/or economical car. The introduction of newly available computers for structural analysis from the 1960s, with computers like the IBM 360, the thickness of sheet metal in bodyshells was reduced to the minimum needed for structural integrity. However, corrosion prevention / rustproofing, that had not previously been significant because of the thickness of metal and separate chassis, had not kept pace with this new construction technology. The lightest monocoque economy cars would be the most affected by structural corrosion.

=== 1960s ===
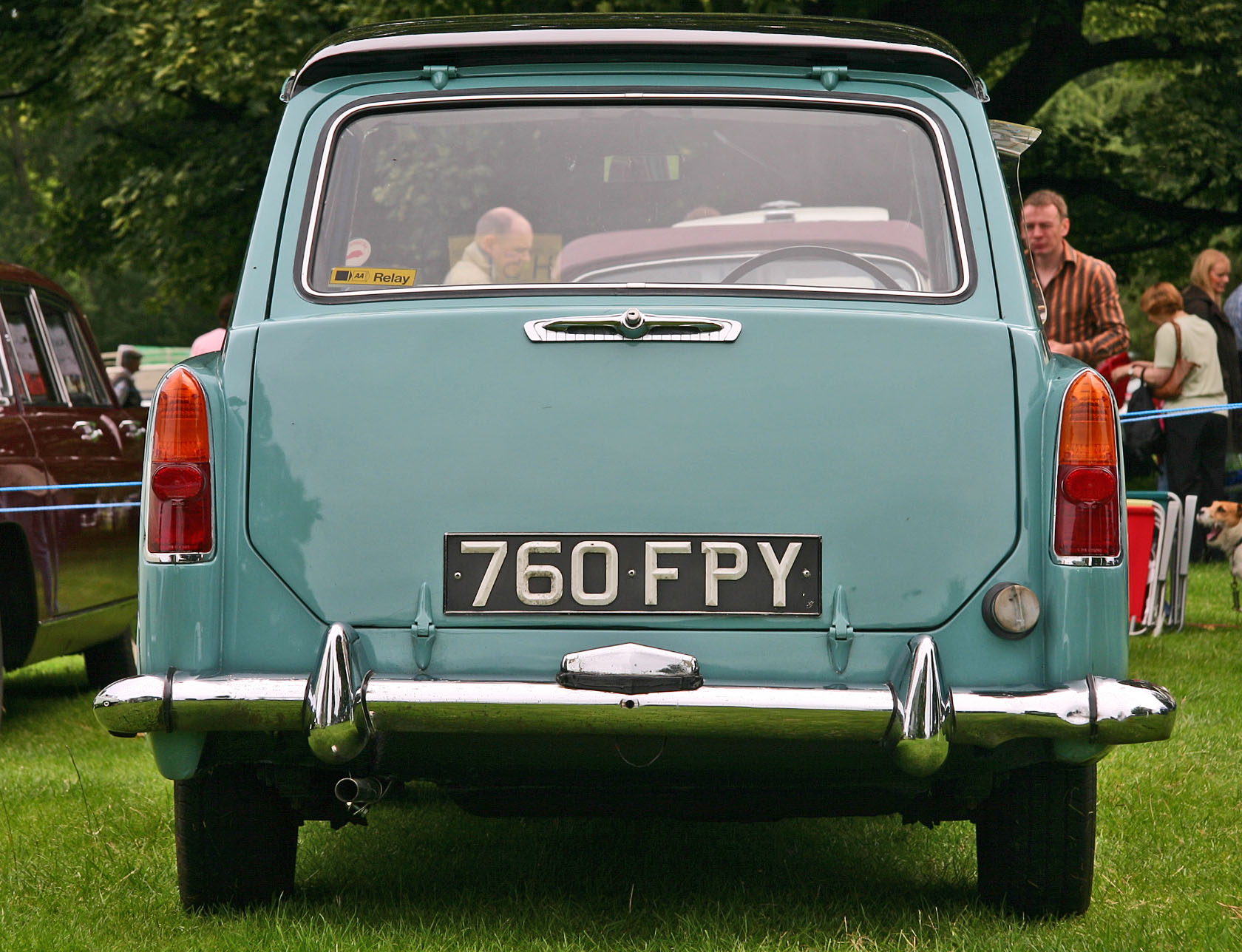
Austin A40 Farina MkII Countryman two piece tailgate

The world's first hatchback, the 1958 FR layout Austin A40 Farina Countryman model that was a co-development of BMC and the Italian design house Pininfarina at a time when this was unusual. It had a lift up rear window and drop down boot lid. It was also sold as a two-door saloon. It was built in the UK and also in Italy by Innocenti. For 1965 Innocenti designed a new single-piece rear door for their Combinata version of the Countryman. This top-hinged door used struts to hold it up over a wide cargo opening and was a true hatchback – a model never developed in the home (United Kingdom) market. The Countryman name has 'estate' type associations, and BMC successor company Rover used the name on estate cars / Station Wagons so it is largely forgotten.

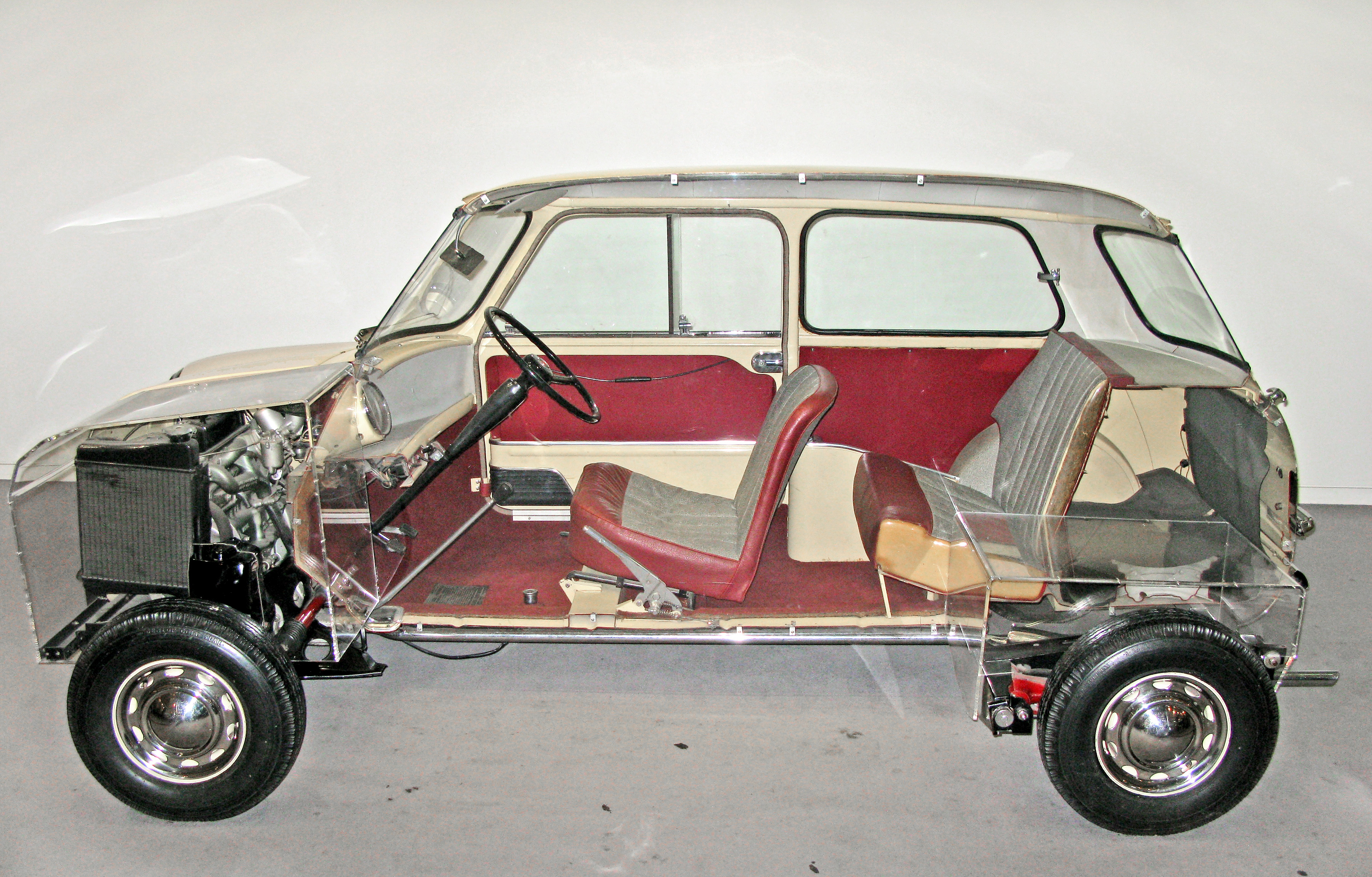
BMC Austin-Morris Mini cross section shows how packaging maximizes passenger space.

The next major advance in small car design was the 1959 848 cc FF layout Austin Mini from the British Motor Corporation, designed by Alec Issigonis as a response to the first oil crisis, the 1956 Suez Crisis, and the boom in bubble cars and Microcars that followed. It was the first front-wheel-drive car with a water-cooled in-line four-cylinder engine mounted transversely - the BMC A-Series engine. This allowed eighty percent of the floor plan for the use of passengers and luggage. The majority of modern cars use this configuration. Its progressive rate rubber sprung independent suspension (Hydrolastic 1964–1971), low centre of gravity, and wheel at each corner with radial tyres, increased the car's grip and handling over all but the most expensive automobiles on the market. The Mini was voted the second most important car of the 20th century after the Ford Model T. Badge engineered luxury versions with modified bodywork and wood and leather interiors were made under the names of Riley Elf and Wolesely Hornet. Customised versions were made by coach-builders like Harold Radford, and were very popular with the rich and famous of 1960s London. From 1964 a Jeep like version (that had been rejected by British Armed Forces), of the Mini, the Mini Moke was popular with the King's Road / Carnaby Street, Swinging London set. An Estate car / station-wagon (with a non-structural wood frame 'Countryman' version), a Van and Pick-up versions were also successful. In 1962, a slightly larger 1098cc (and later 1256cc) version of the Mini engineering design was launched, as the Austin/Morris 1100. It had front disc brakes as standard. It had Italian styling by Pininfarina and used front-to-rear interconnected independent Hydrolastic suspension. It was available in sporting MG versions, and luxury wood and leather interior Riley, Wolesely and Vanden Plas versions. It was for most of the 1960s, the top selling car in Britain, and was sold until the mid-1970s. It was sold as the Austin America in the U.S., Canada, and Switzerland between 1968 and 1972. It was also sold in South Africa - Austin Apache and Spain - Austin Victoria, with Triumph type Michelotti re-styling, built in local factories. BMC had hedged their bets after the launch of the front wheel drive Mini and 1100 and to meet the demands of more conservative customers, by keeping their rear wheel drive Austin A40 Farina in production until 1967 and Morris Minor until 1971, while front-wheel-drive was being accepted by the UK and European markets. Demand from older customers in particular kept the Minor in production, despite it being very outdated.

Ford in the UK in 1959 launched the Anglia 105E. It had a new overhead valve engine and a four speed gearbox, which was a great improvement over the previous model, the Anglia 100E that had a side-valve engine and only three speeds. It was rear wheel drive using a rear beam axle and leaf springs, with front MacPherson struts used like its predecessor. It used much miniaturised late 1950s American-influenced styling that was very fashionable, including a sweeping nose line, and on deluxe versions, a full-width slanted chrome grille in between prominent "eye" headlamps. The car also sported a backward-slanted rear window and tailfins. This dated the car over its nine-year production life. The Anglia's Ford Kent engine was in production in a developed form into the 21st century.

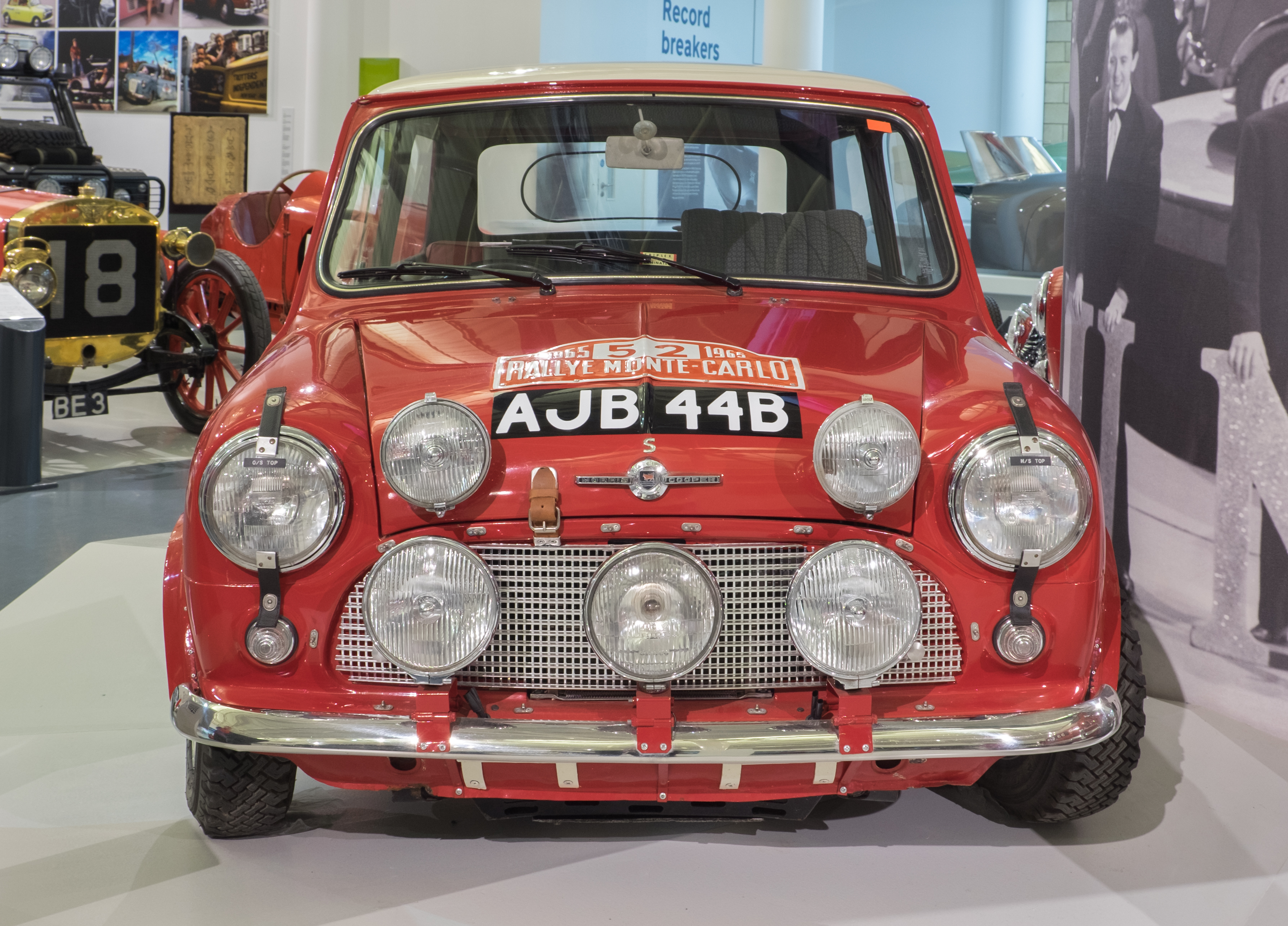
1965 Monte Carlo Rally winner: 1964 Morris Mini Cooper S

The launch in the 1960s of the Mini Cooper to exploit the exceptional grip and handling of the Austin Mini, along with its success in rallying, (Monte Carlo Rally in particular) and circuit racing, first showed that economy cars could be effective sports cars. It made traditional sports cars like the MG Midget look very old fashioned. The rear-wheel-drive Ford Lotus Cortina and Ford Escort 1300GT and RS1600, along with the Vauxhall Viva GT and Brabham SL/90 HB in the late 1960s opened up this market still further in Britain. Meanwhile, from the 1950s Abarth tuned Fiats and Gordini tuned Renaults did the same in Italy and France.

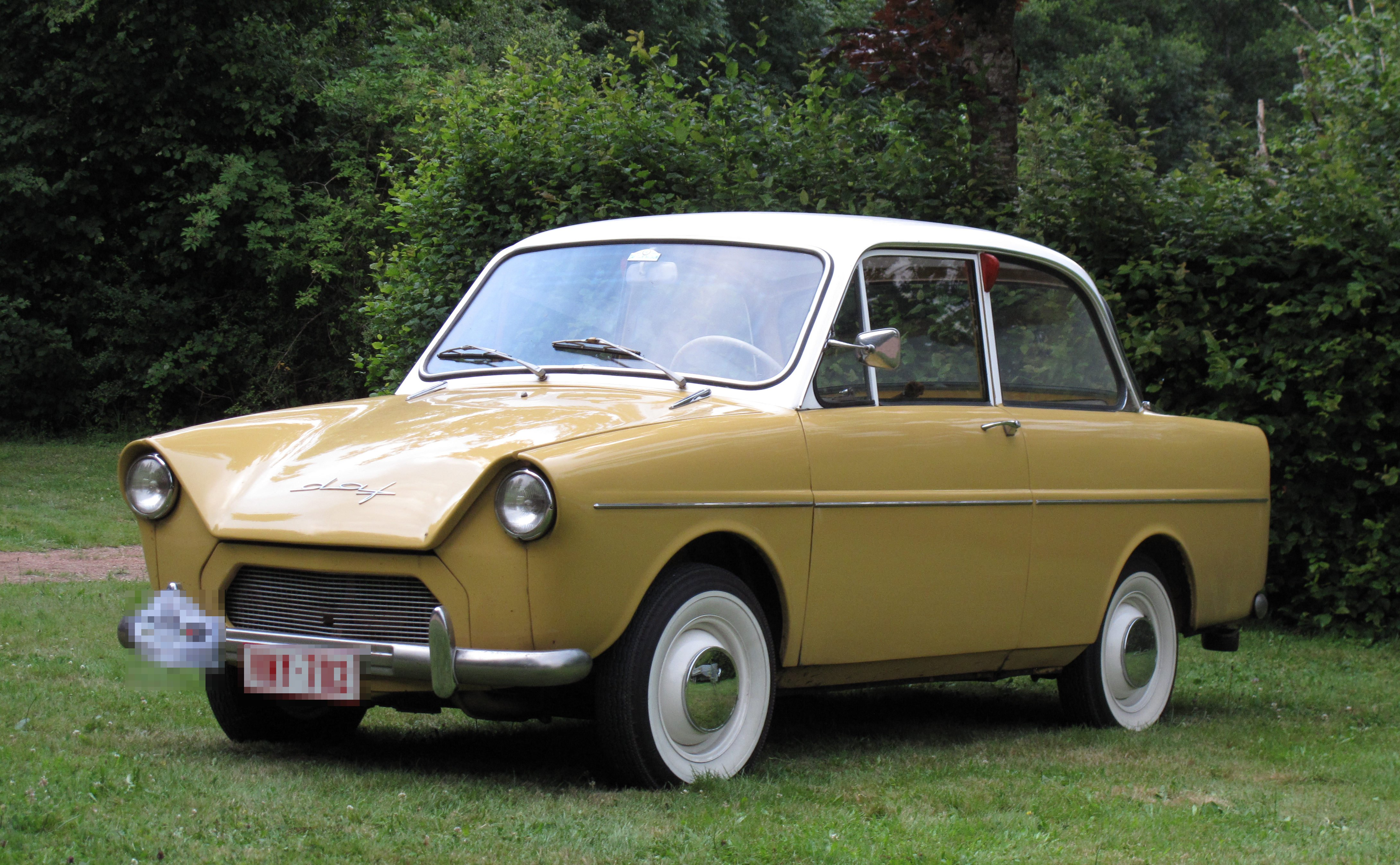
1959 DAF 600

Also in 1959 the FR layout DAF 600, with a rear-mounted automatic gearbox, was launched in the Netherlands. The 600 was the first car to have a continuously variable transmission (CVT) system—the innovative DAF Variomatic. It was the first European economy car with an automatic gearbox. The CVT was continued through the 1960s and 1970s by DAF with the DAF Daffodil, DAF 33, DAF 44, DAF 46, DAF 66, and later by Volvo after they merged with the Volvo 340. The 1960s Austin Mini/Austin 1100 compact and innovative automatic gearbox, developed by Automotive Products (with a conventional epicyclic / torque converter coupling) was much less efficient at transmitting drive.

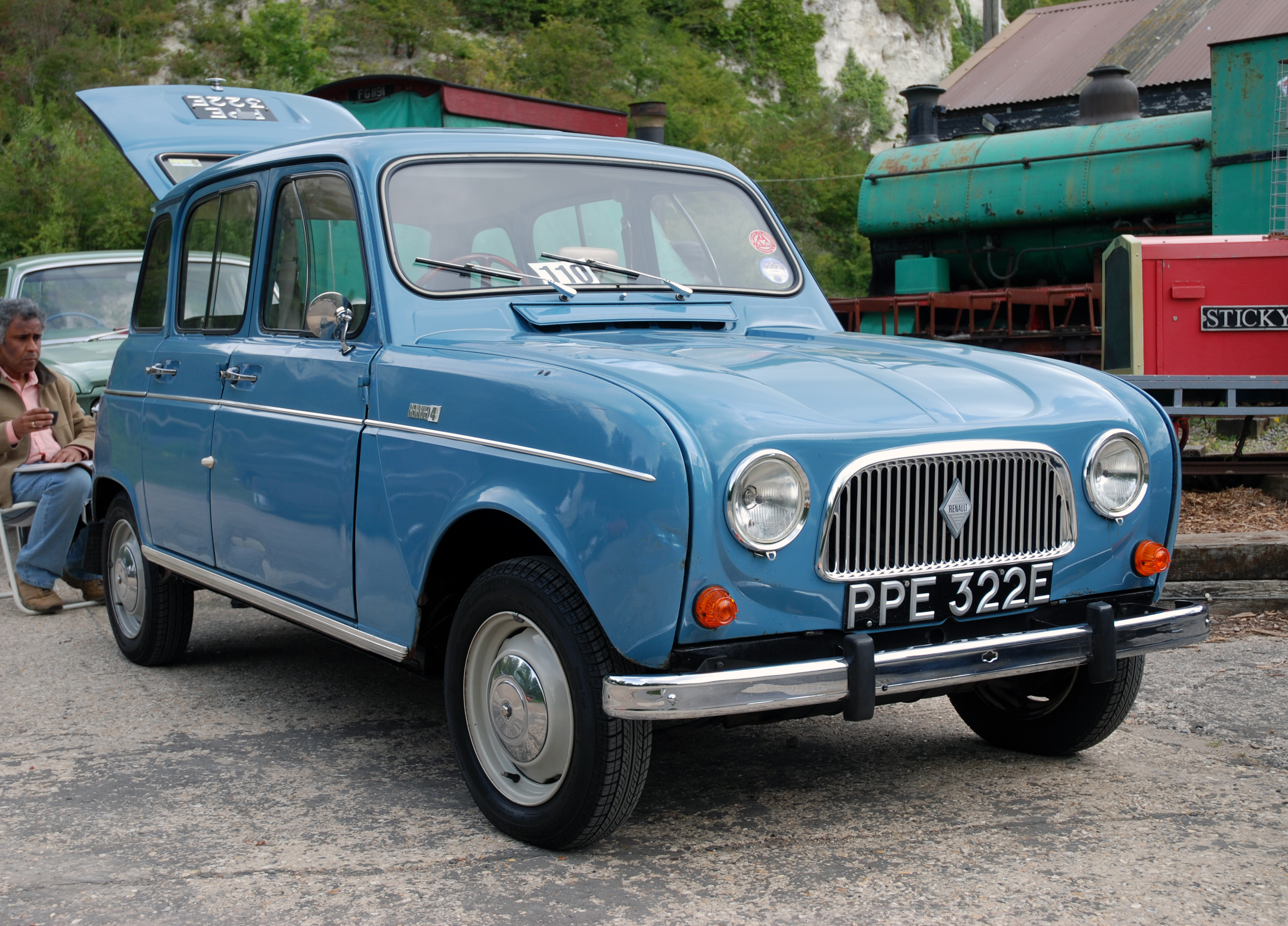
Renault 4 with open rear door

In the 1960s, the semi-monocoque/platform chassis 750 cc Renault 4 (arguably the first small five-door hatchback, but viewed as a small estate car or station wagon at the time) was launched in France. It had a very soft but well controlled ride like the Citroën 2CV. In layout, it was essentially an economy car version of the 1930s designed Citroën Traction Avant, in particular the 'Commerciale' derivative, but with fully independent rear suspension (the Commerciale used a flexible beam axle, similar to 1970s VW twist-beam rear suspension). The Commerciale had been smaller than an estate car with a horizontally split two-piece rear door before the second world war. When it was relaunched in 1954 it featured a one-piece top-hinged tailgate. Citroën responded with the 2CV-based 1960 602 cc Citroën Ami and hatchback 1967 Citroën Dyane. Also in France, in 1966 Renault launched the midrange Renault 16 – although it was not an economy car, it is widely recognised as the first non-commercial mass-market hatchback car. The hatchback was a leap forward in practicality. It was adopted as a standard feature on most European cars, with saloons declining in popularity apart from at the top of the market over the next twenty years. The hatchback improved the versatility of economy cars that were more limited in load carrying ability than larger cars.

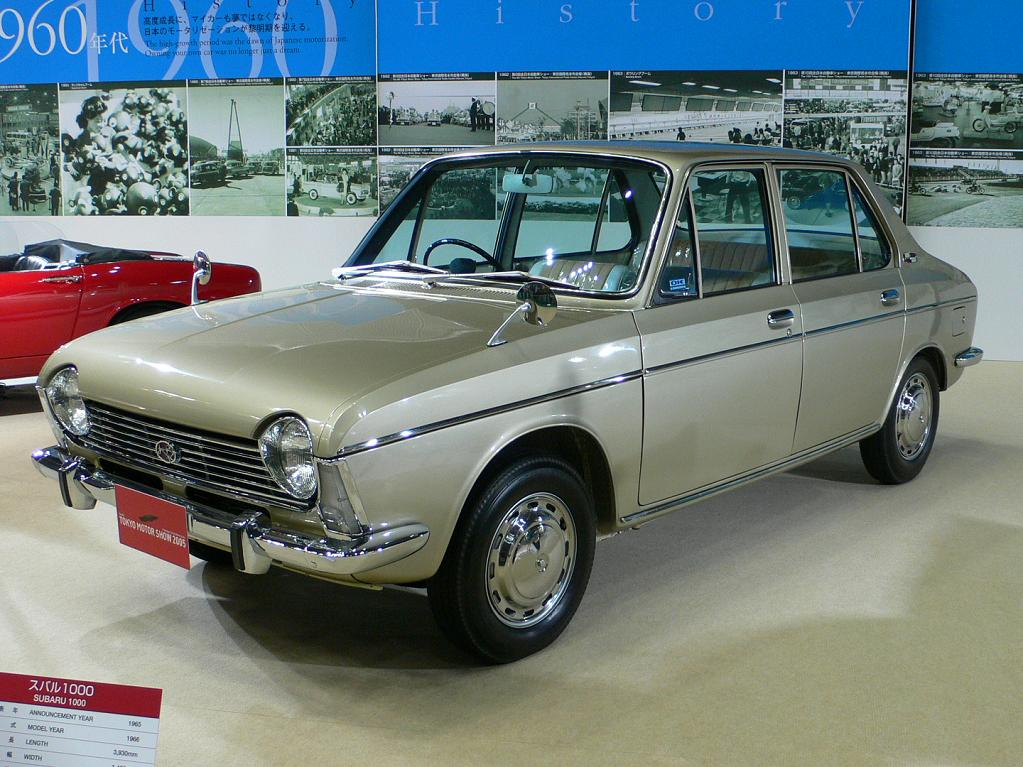
1966 Subaru 1000

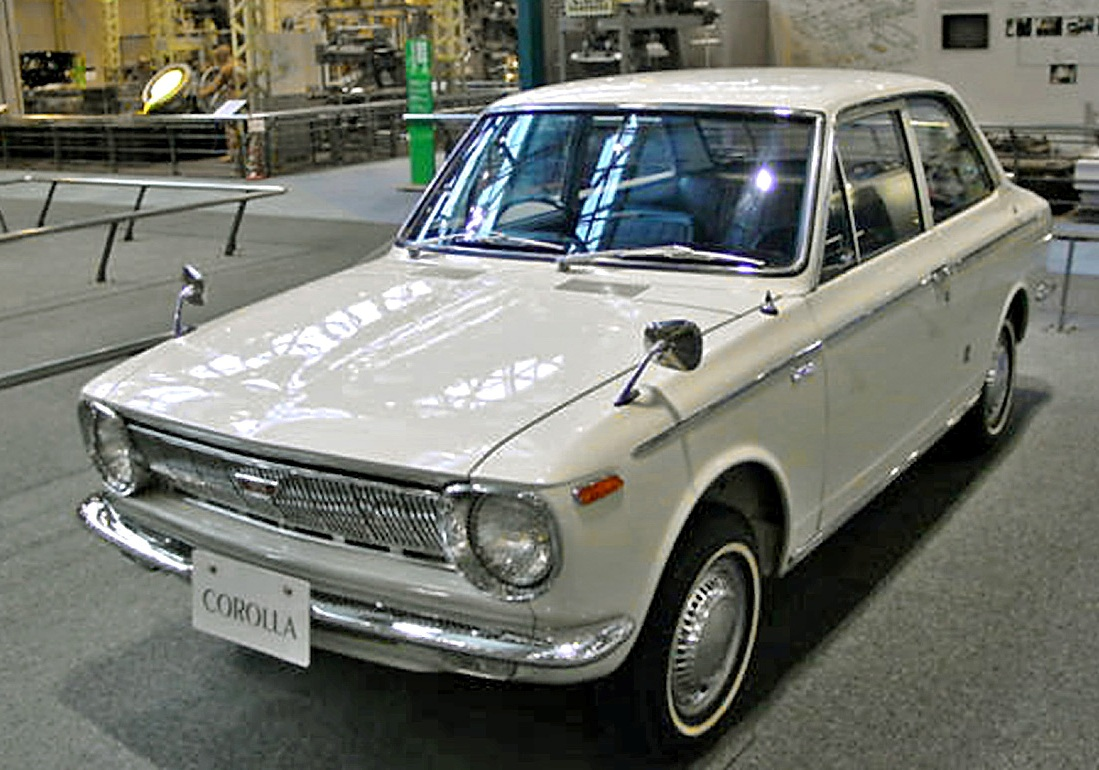
1966 Toyota Corolla

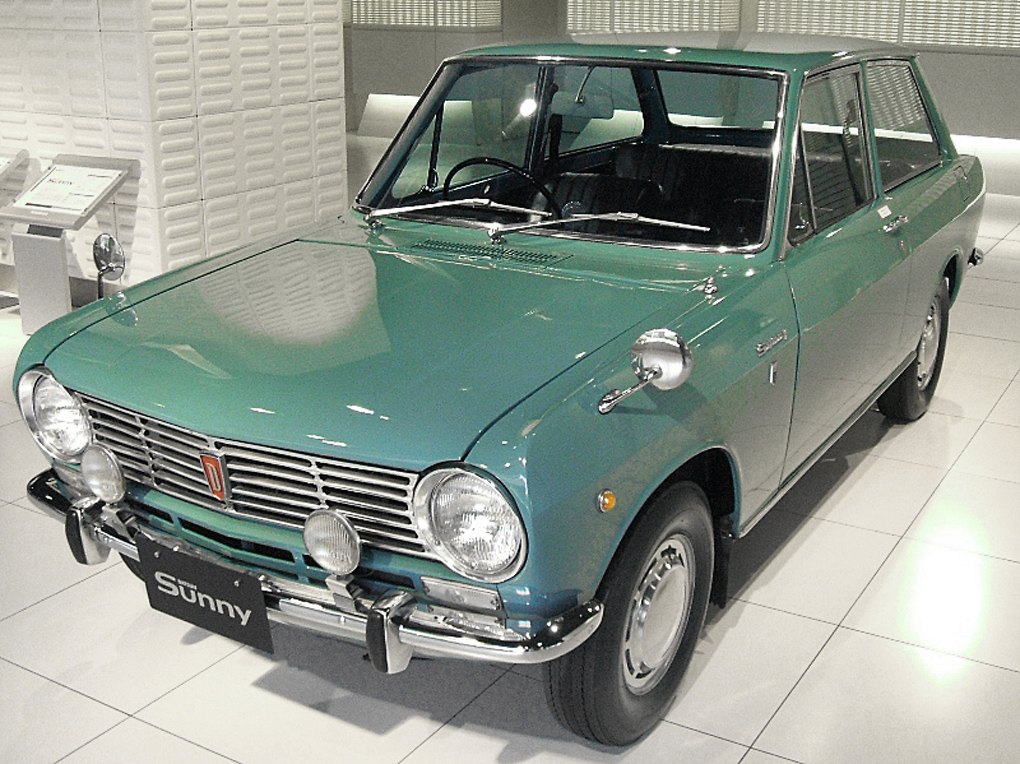
1966 Datsun/Nissan Sunny

In the 1960s the Japanese MITI "national car" class of vehicles, saw the launch of the Isuzu Bellett, Daihatsu Compagno and Mazda Familia in 1963, the Mitsubishi Colt in 1965, and the Nissan Sunny, Subaru 1000, and Toyota Corolla in 1966. Honda introduced their first four-door sedan in 1969, called the Honda 1300. In North America, these cars were classified as subcompact cars. The 1960s Toyota Corolla, Datsun Sunny refined the conventional small rear-wheel-drive economy cars were widely exported from Japan as postwar international competition and trade increased. Japan also instituted the "Shaken" road-worthiness testing regime, that required progressively more expensive maintenance, involving the replacement of entire vehicle systems, that was unnecessary for safety, year on year, to devalue older cars and promote new cars on their home market that were available for low prices. Most cars in Japan are less than five years old.

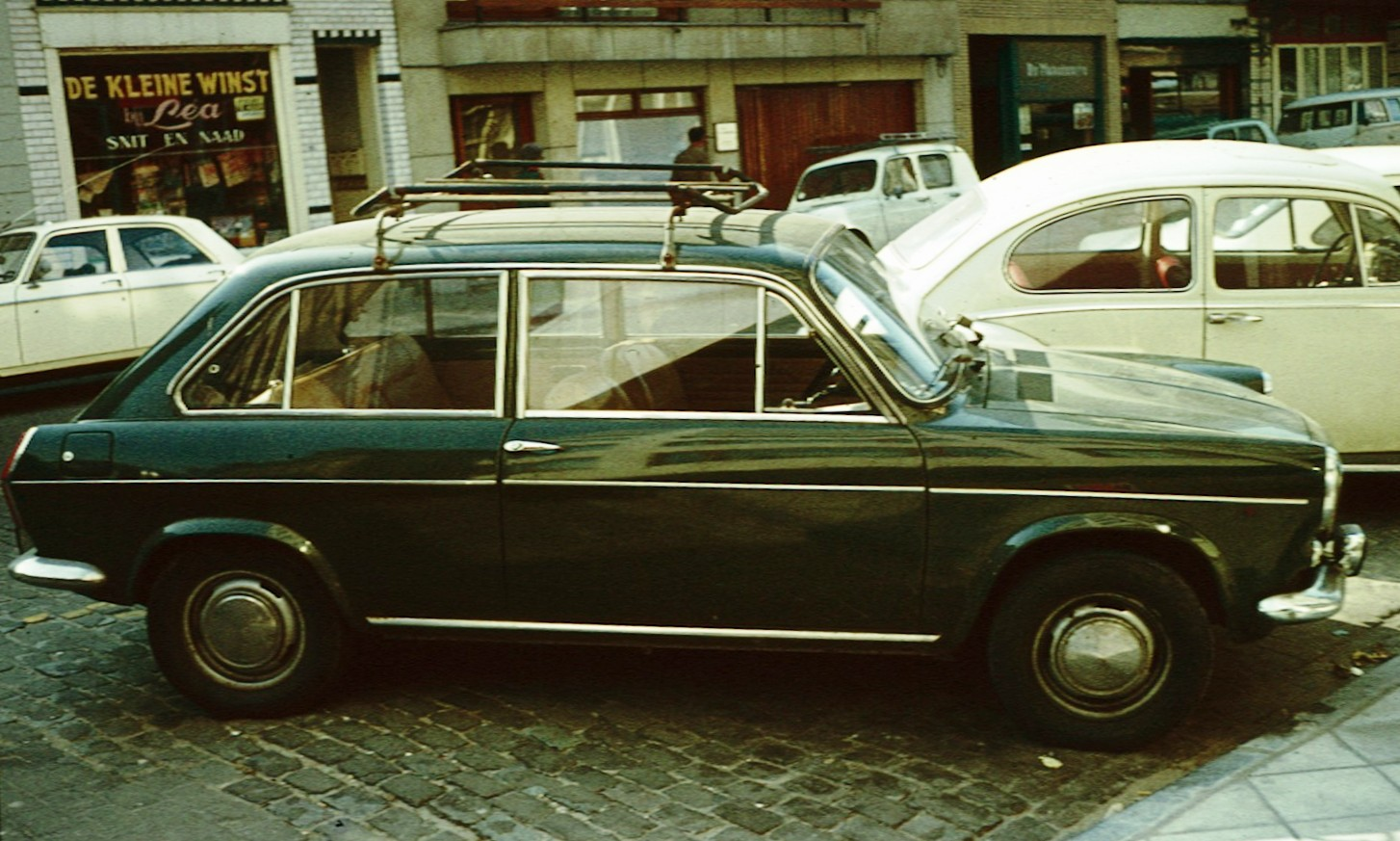
Autobianchi Primula

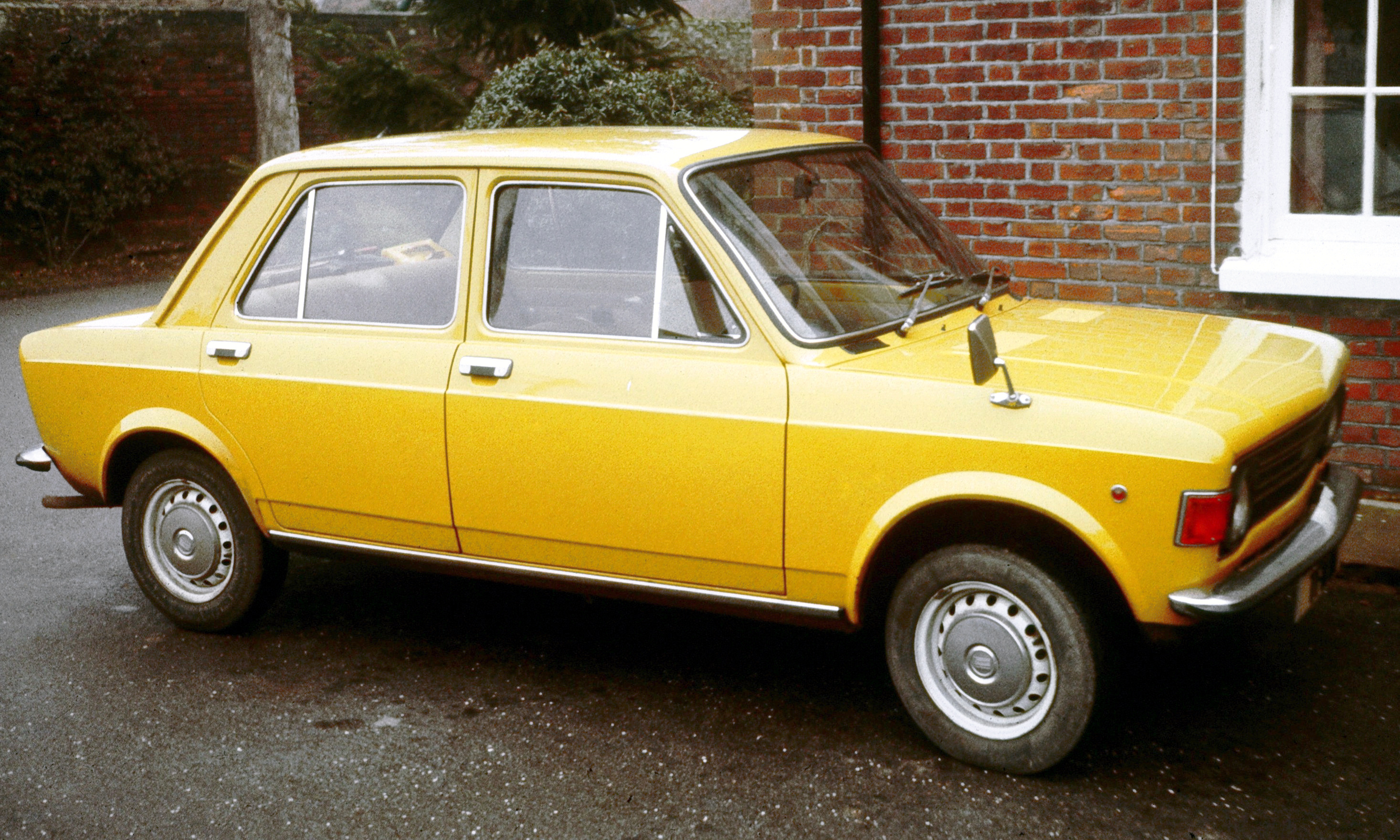
1970 Fiat 128

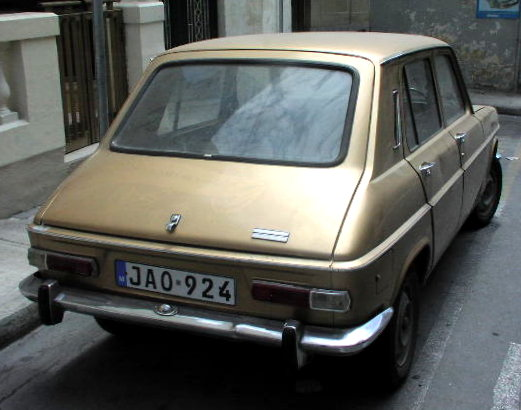
Simca 1100 Hatchback

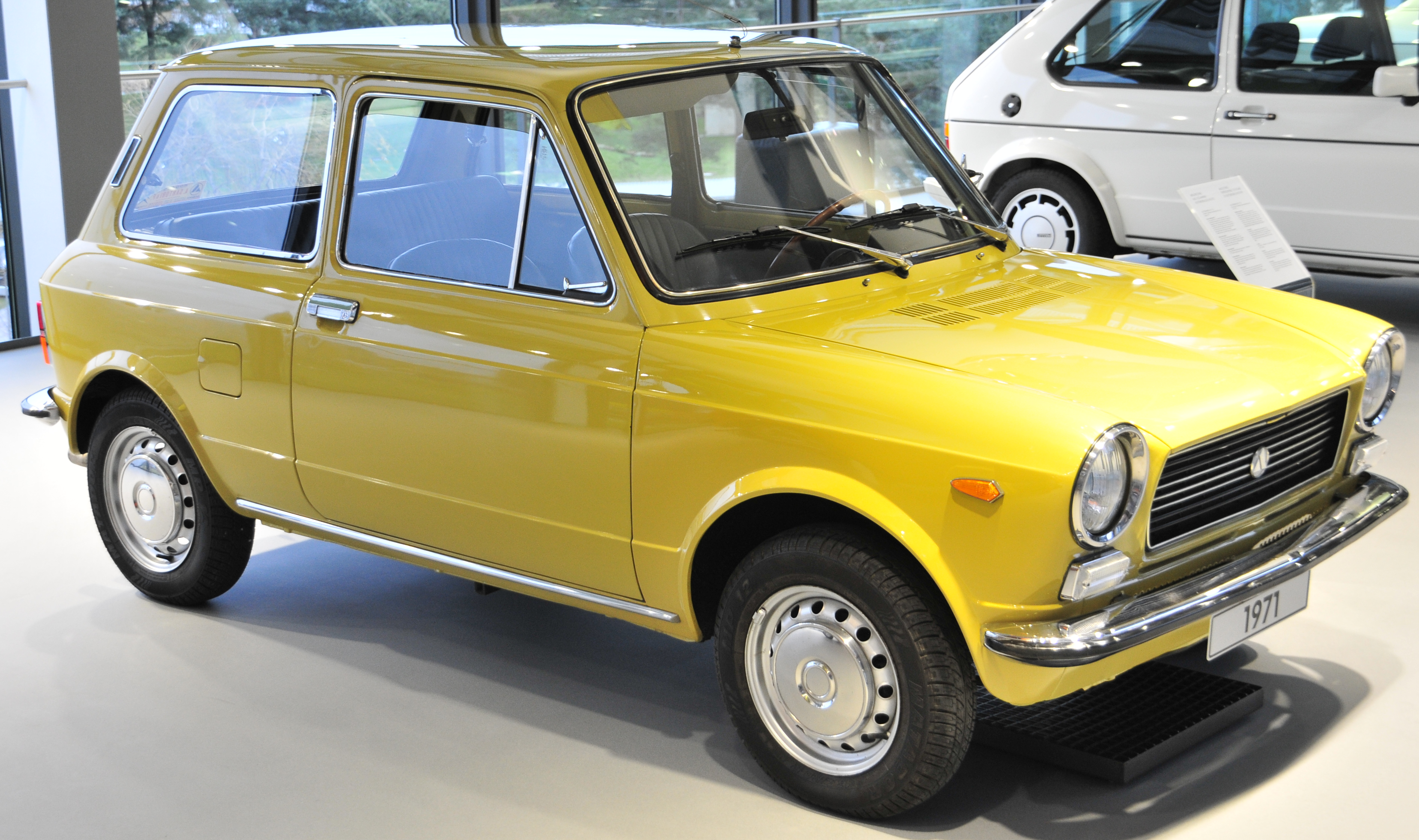
1971 Autobianchi A112

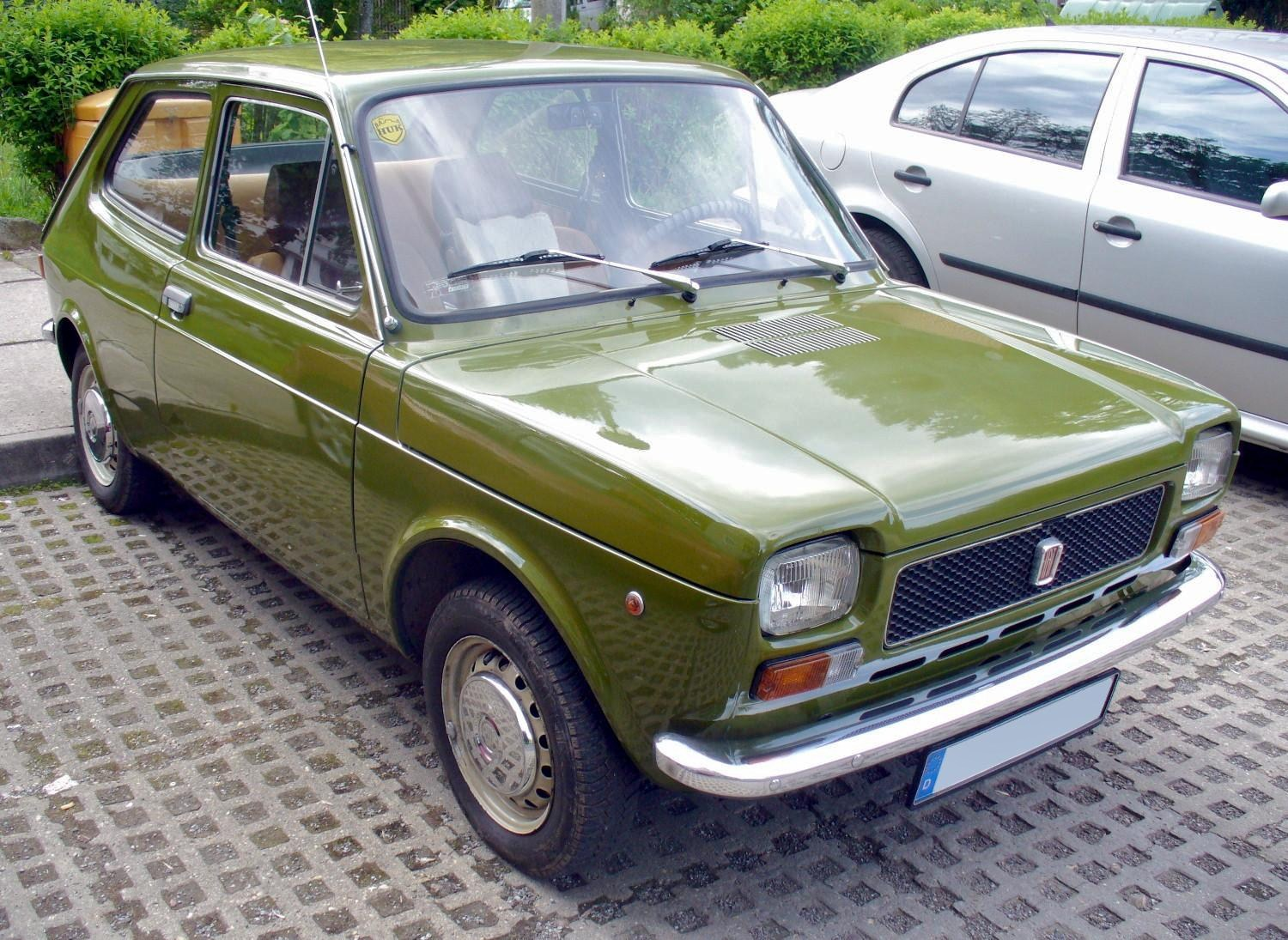
Fiat 127 MK1

In 1962 Fiat introduced the third generation FR layout Fiat 1100, called the 1100D. It was restyled into the 1100R from 1966. The Fiat 1100D was made in India from 1964 onwards. In 1973 (for that model year alone) it was named the Premier President. From 1974 onwards until it was finally discontinued in 2000, it was known as the Premier Padmini.

In 1964 Fiat under the engineering leadership of Dante Giacosa designed the first car with a transverse engine and an end on gearbox (using different length drive shafts) and a hatchback - the Autobianchi Primula, It had Pininfarina styling that bore a resemblance to the Austin 1100. It was put into limited production by Fiat under their Autobianchi brand. Fiat still produced the FR layout 1100 of about the same size, so that any potential technical teething problems would not damage their brand. Primula production ceased in 1970, by which time 74,858 had been built. It was replaced by the Autobianchi A112 and Autobianchi A111 with the same mechanical layout. They were only sold in mainland Europe, where they were popular into the 1980s (replaced by the Lancia Y10), but unknown in the UK. The French 1967 Simca 1100 (who had previously used Fiat technology under licence), the 1969 Fiat 128, and the 1971 Fiat 127 regarded as the first 'super-mini' brought this development to a wider audience. The 128 was Dante Giacosa's final project. This layout gradually superseded the gearbox in the engine's sump of BMC Austin Morris and later Peugeot PSA X engine, until the only car in production with this transmission layout by the 1990s, was the then long obsolescent Austin (Rover) Mini.

The Simca 1100 was also the first small car, that was designed from the outset, with an angled single piece hatchback tailgate to enter large scale production. The earlier Renault 4 tailgate was near vertical like an estate car, and the Austin A40 originally had a split tailgate. The Simca was successful in France, but less so elsewhere due to 'tappety' engines and body corrosion. A total of 2.2 million cars were produced by 1985. In 1972 Renault introduced the monocoque Renault 5 supermini hatchback, that used the proven and successful Renault 4 mechanicals and suspension. It was made until 1985, when it was replaced by the 'Super Cinq'. American Motors (AMC) marketed a version with sealed-beam headlamps and reinforced bumpers as the 'Le Car' in the U.S. from 1976 to 1983.

GM's British and German subsidiaries re-entered the small car market with then conventional FR layout cars for the first time since the Second World War in the early 1960s. The Vauxhall Viva, launched in September 1963, and was replaced in September 1966. It was also the first new small car produced by Vauxhall since 1936. The HA Viva was powered by a 1,057 cc (64.5 cu in), overhead valve, four cylinder, front-mounted engine driving the rear wheels. It was comparable in size and mechanical specifications with the new GM Germany Opel Kadett released in 1962 in continental Europe. The Opel featured a brand new OHV 993cc engine, that in a developed form lasted until the early 1990s. The Viva and Kadett were sold alongside each other in many markets. The HA Viva was just an inch longer than the Ford Anglia which dated back to 1959. It was offered only as a two-door saloon. The HB Viva, announced in September 1966 and sold by Vauxhall until 1970, was a larger car than the HA, featuring coke bottle styling, and was modelled after American General Motors (GM) models such as the Chevrolet Impala/Caprice of the period. It featured the same basic engine as the HA, but enlarged to 1,159 cc, but with the added weight of the larger body the final drive gearing was reduced to maintain performance. The Opel Kadett B was launched in 1965.

In 1968 Ford replaced the outmoded Anglia with the Ford Escort which was sold across Western Europe. It was longer and wider than its predecessor to fill the gap left by increasing the size of Ford's next model up in the range the Ford Cortina. It had the same mechanical layout and suspension as the Cortina and Anglia, but with contemporary 'Coke Bottle' styling. It struggled to compete with the larger and more comfortable second generation 1965 Opel Kadett in West Germany.

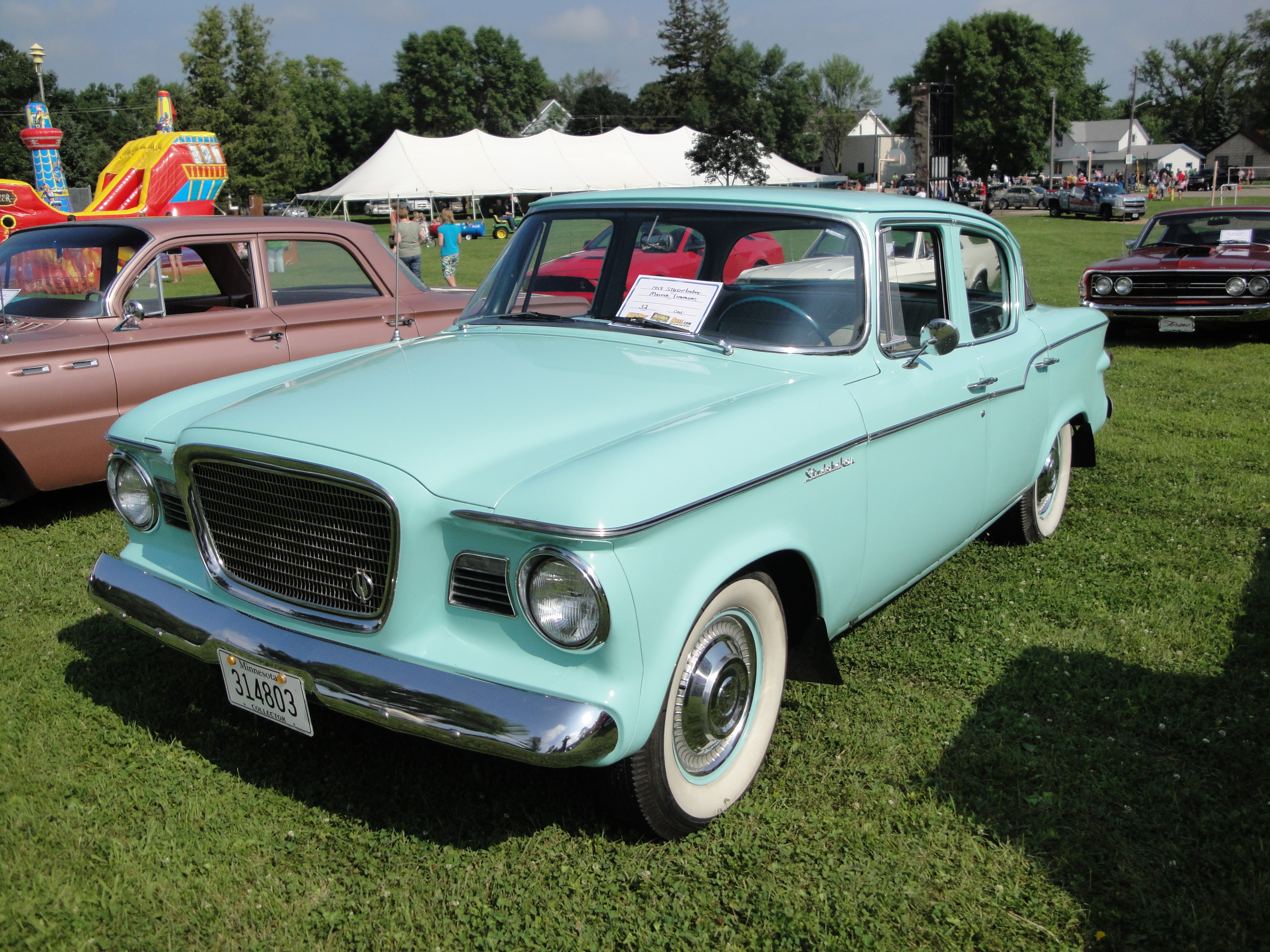
1959 Studebaker Lark

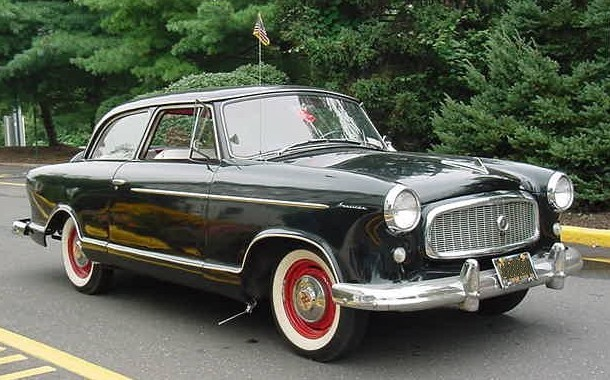
1959 Rambler American

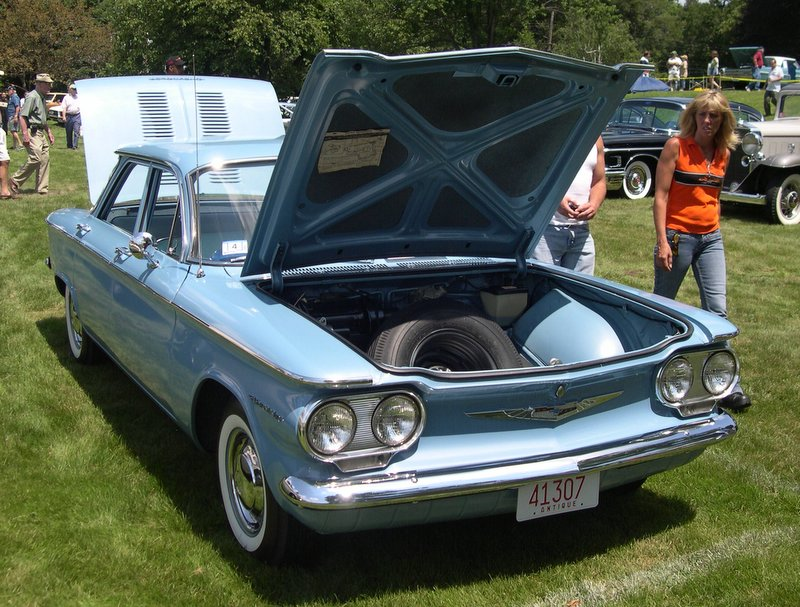
1960 Chevrolet Corvair

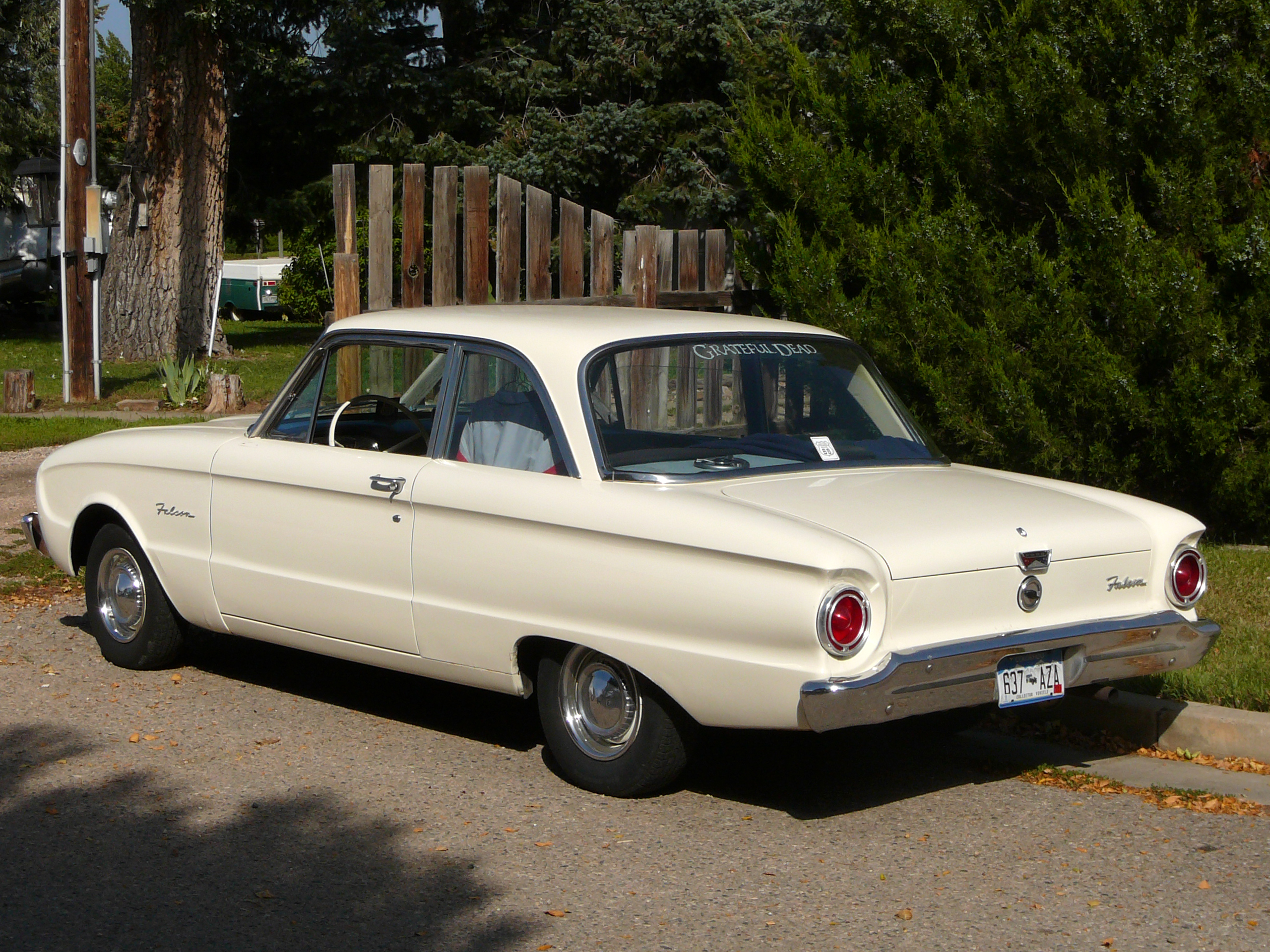
1960 Ford Falcon

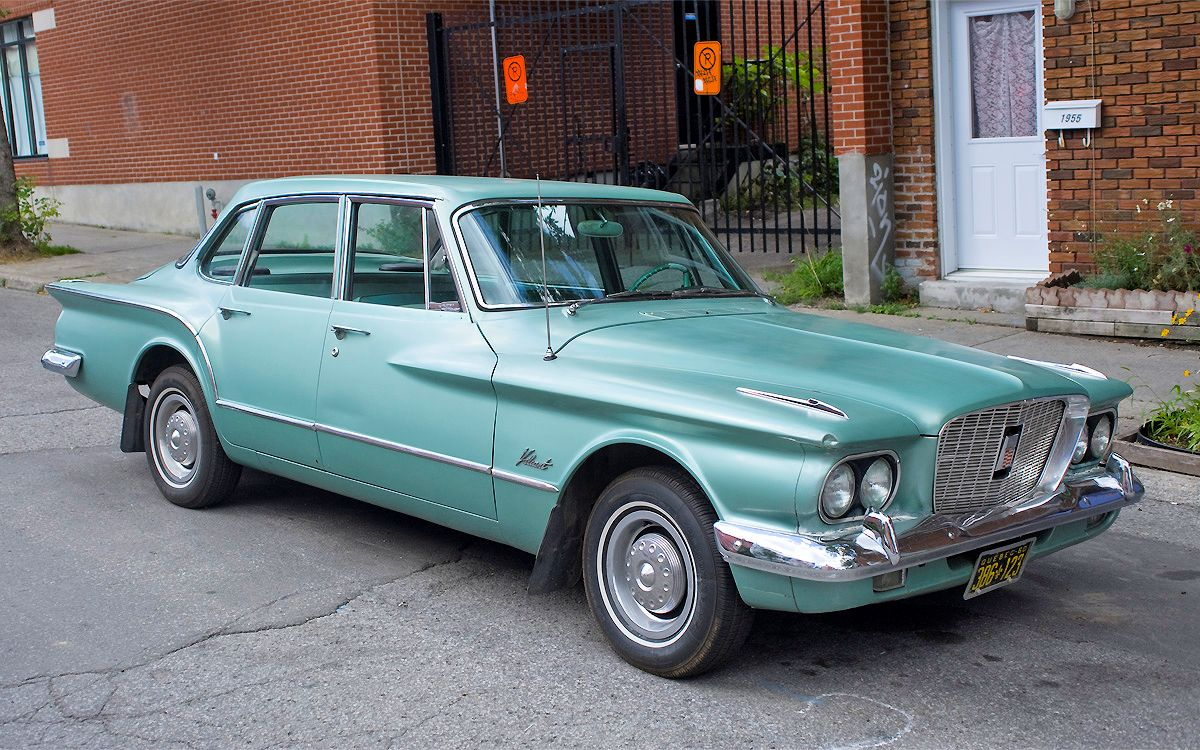
1960 Plymouth Valiant Sedan

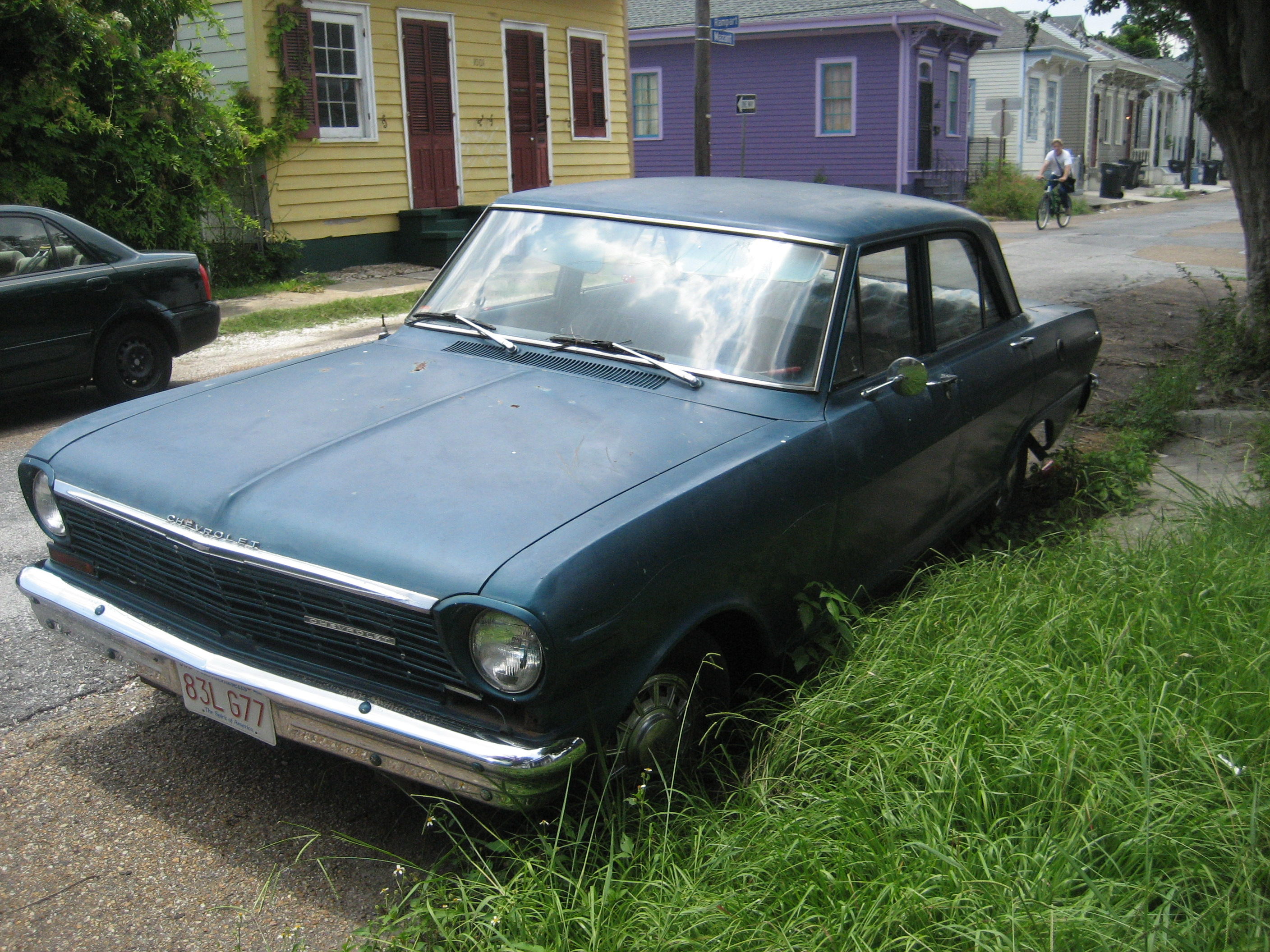
Chevy II 4 Door Sedan

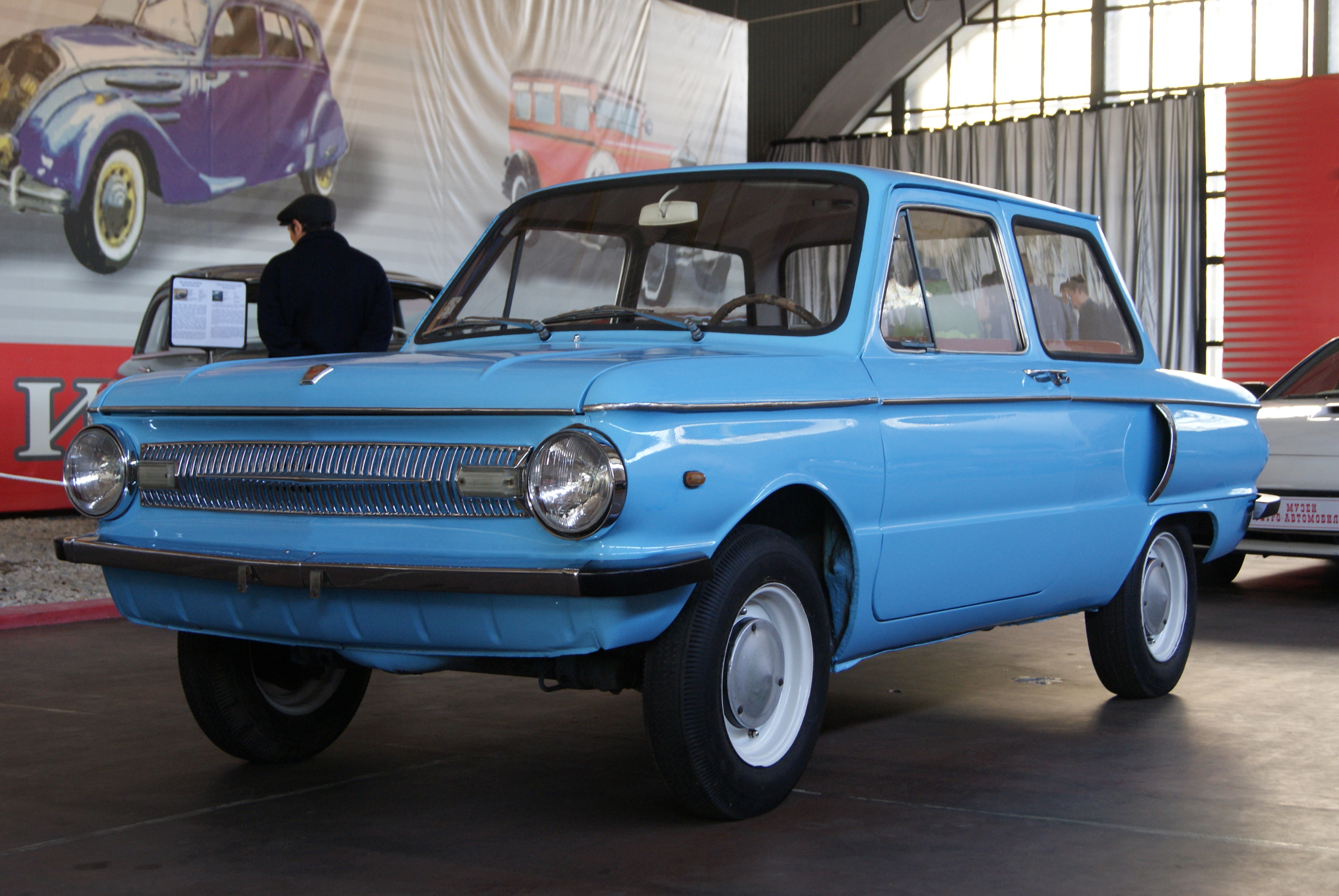
1966 ZAZ-966

In the U.S. market, in 1959 Studebaker launched the Studebaker Lark, then 1960 brought the Chevrolet Corvair, Ford Falcon, and Plymouth Valiant into the market segment dominated by Rambler. These vehicles were lower priced and offered better fuel economy than the standard domestic full-size models, that had grown in size and price through the 1950s. The Corvair, Chevrolet's rear-engined compact car, was originally brought to market to compete directly with the VW Beetle. Ford Falcon and Plymouth Valiant were conventional, compact six-cylinder sedans that competed directly with the Rambler American. In 1962 Chevrolet introduced the Chevy II / Nova line of conventional compacts first offered with 4- and six-cylinder engines. These American vehicles were still much larger than fuel-efficient economy cars popular in Europe and Japan. The Corvair is twenty inches longer, seven inches wider, eight hundred pounds heavier and includes an engine almost twice the size of the Beetle that inspired it. Corvair offered VW's rear engine advantages of traction, light steering, and flat floor with Chevrolet's six-passenger room and six-cylinder power American buyers were accustomed to. Later versions of the Corvair were considered sports cars rather than 'economy' cars including Monza Spyder models, which featured one of the first production car turbocharged engines. The Corvair Monza was followed by the Falcon-based Ford Mustang, introduced in 1964, establishing the "pony car" class which included Corvair's replacement, the Chevrolet Camaro in 1967, expanding the domestic pony car market segment started in mid-1960s.

The 1960s also saw the swan song of the rear-engined rear-wheel-drive car RR layout. The first models designed with this layout in Central Europe before the second world war, had better traction than any other two wheel drive car layout. They were very capable in the mountainous country there, that had many unsurfaced roads, just how capable was shown by the performance of the two wheel drive military Kübelwagen version of the VW Beetle. This layout also had better interior space utilisation than front engine rear-wheel-drive cars, and a better ride than those with a live rear beam axle. It was an affordable way to produce a car with all round independent suspension, without the need for expensive constant-velocity joints needed by front-wheel-drive cars, or axle arrangements of FR layout cars. They could have road-holding issues due to unfavorable weight distribution and wheel camber changes (rear wheel tuck under), of the lower-cost swing axle rear suspension design. These were highlighted and a little exaggerated by Ralph Nader. These problems were ameliorated on later Beetles and were eliminated on the second-generation Chevrolet Corvair with the switch to a four-link, fully independent rear suspension. The Hillman Imp, NSU Prinz 4 (styled by Claus Luthe) and Soviet Zaporozhets all had styling cues derived from the original Corvair. Connections to the Corvair are mentioned on their respective Wikipages. The only economy cars with this layout launched since the 1960s have been the turn of the millennium ultra compact two seater city car Smart Fortwo and Indian market Tata Nano.

RR layout cars launched in the 1960s include:

- The 874 cc Hillman Imp - UK.
- The 583 cc NSU Prinz, and the relatively unsuccessful attempt at diversification of the Volkswagen Type 3, Volkswagen Type 4 - West Germany.
- The 956–1289 cc Renault 8/10 and 777–1294 cc Simca 1000 - France.
- The 2296 cc Chevrolet Corvair - US.
- The first 1960s air-cooled two-stroke in-line twin-engined generation of the 360 cc Keicar class - the 1958 Subaru 360, Mitsubishi 360 1961, Mazda Carol 1962, Daihatsu Fellow 1966, Honda N360 and the Suzuki Fronte 1967 along with the non Keicar, Renault based Hino Motors 4CV was replaced by the 1961 Contessa - Japan.
- In Communist Eastern Europe there was the Škoda 1000MB/1100MB that was developed into the 1970s Škoda S100/110 and then the 1970s–1980s Škoda 105/120/125 Estelle - Czechoslovakia.
- Centrally planned as the small Soviet car, the Zaporozhets from the Ukrainian ZAZ factory (1960-1969 styled like a Fiat 600), (1966-1994 styled like NSU Prinz 4), was sold in the USSR and Warsaw Pact/COMECON countries of Eastern and Central Europe. It had a low price and good fuel economy and was designed to be DIY maintained by the customer, because of lack of maintenance facilities in communist countries. It was also issued to Soviet war amputees by the state through their social welfare system. In total, 3,422,444 air-cooled Zaporozhets made. - Soviet Union

=== 1970s ===
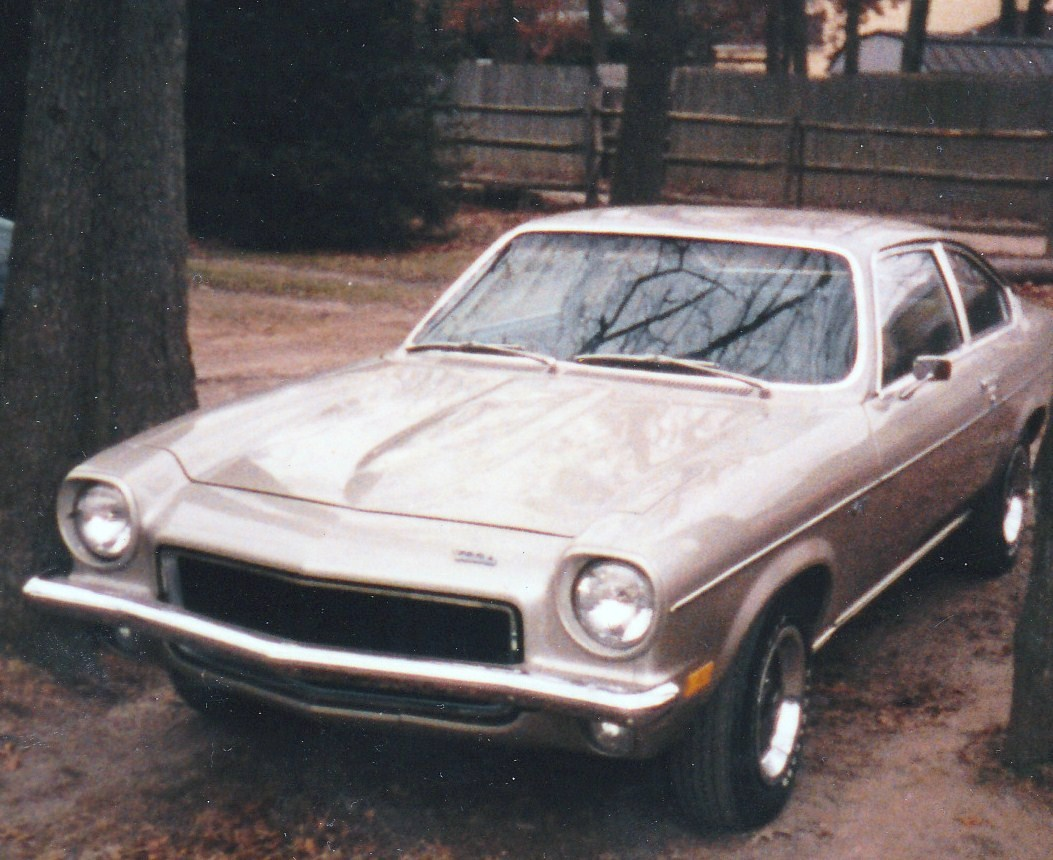
1973 Chevrolet Vega GT Hatchback

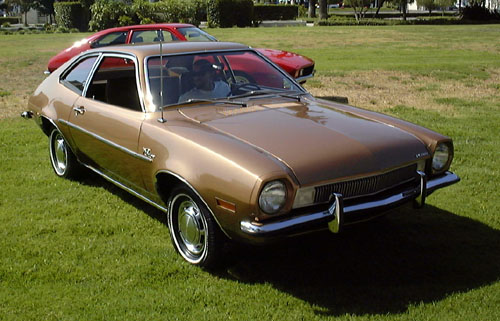
1972 Ford Pinto Sedan

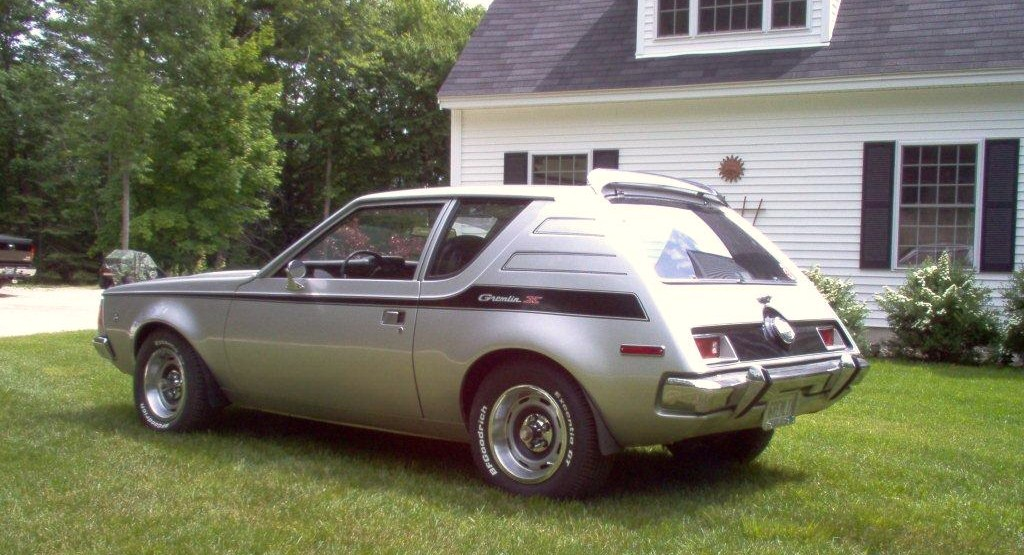
1971 AMC Gremlin X

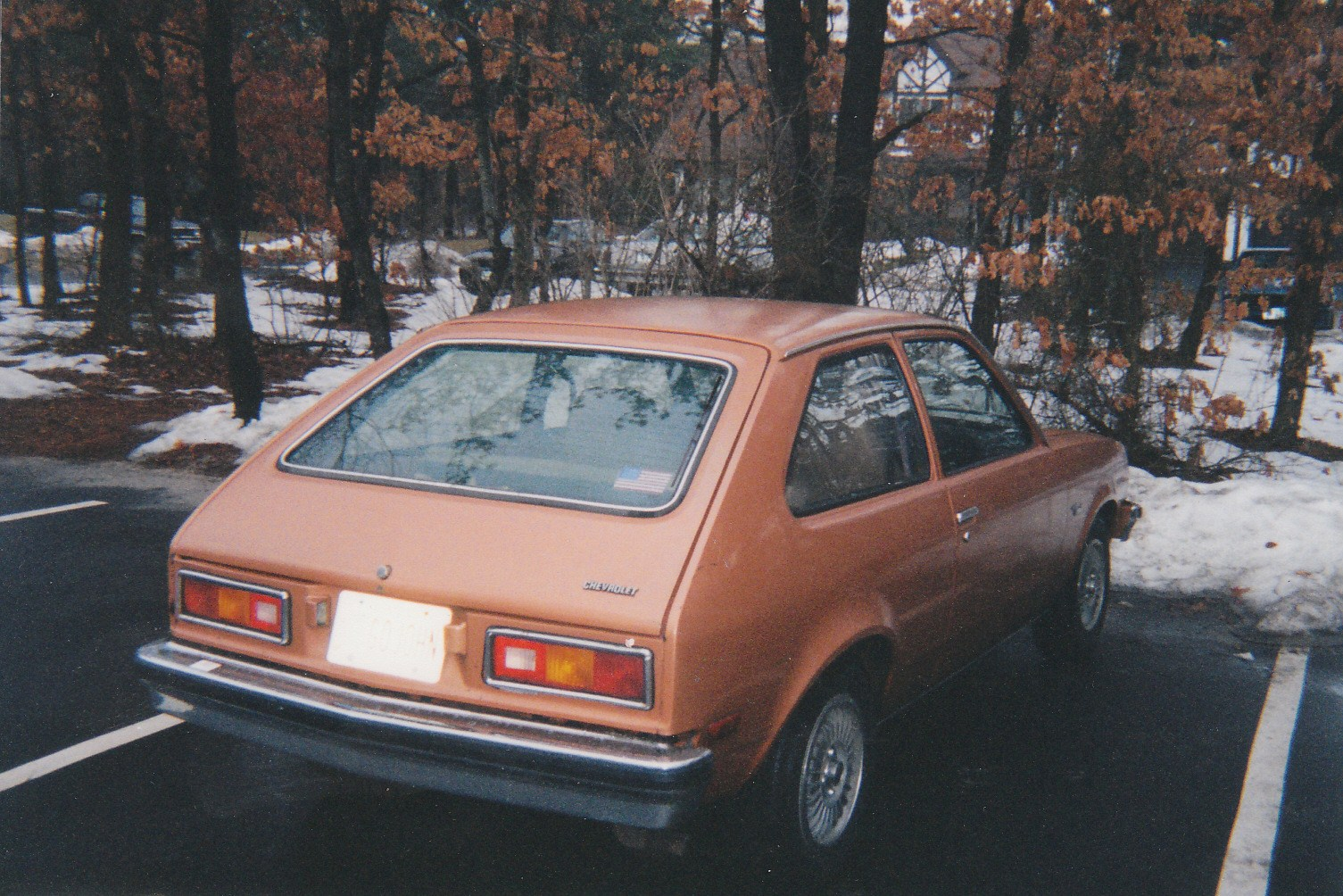
1977 Chevrolet Chevette Hatchback

The 1973 oil crisis (and again in 1979), emphasised the importance of fuel economy worldwide, as an increasing proportion of the cost of vehicle operation. This had particular impact in the United States with its greater distances, which was arguably the nation hardest hit because of the prevalence of large, fuel-thirsty cars. At the same time, new emissions and safety regulations were being implemented requiring major and costly changes to vehicle design and construction for the U.S. market. The sales of imported economy cars had continued to rise from the 1960s. The first response by domestic American car makers included the U.S. produced, FR layout cars, the AMC Gremlin, Chevrolet Vega, and Ford Pinto, along with captive imports.

AMC was determined to have the first subcompact offering and 1970 AMC Gremlin sales began six months ahead of the all-new 1971 models from GM and Ford. The Gremlin used the AMC Hornet's existing design with a shortened wheelbase and "chopped" tail, and had an important low-price advantage.

The Chevrolet Vega, featuring attractive miniaturised Camaro styling, introduced in September 1970, was GM's first subcompact, economy car. Nearly two million were sold over its seven-year production run, due in part to its low price and fuel economy. By 1974, the Vega was among the top 10 best-selling American-made cars, but the aluminum-block engine developed a questionable reputation. Chevrolet increased the engine warranty to 50,000 miles (80,000 km) to all Vega owners, which proved costly for Chevrolet. The 1976 Vega had extensive engine and body durability improvements and a five-year/60,000 mi (97,000 km) engine warranty. After a three-year sales decline, the Vega and its aluminium engine were discontinued at the end of the 1977 model year.

Pontiac's cheapest car was a re-badged Vega variant exclusively available in Canada for the 1973-74 model years, and introduced in the U.S. the following year. The final 1977 models featured the first use of Pontiac's Iron Duke inline-4 engine. Lower priced versions of the Chevrolet Monza were introduced for 1978 and rebadged variants of the discontinued Vega were also added to the Monza line - the Monza wagon using the Vega Kammback body was sold for the 1978-79 model years, and the Monza S hatchback, a price leader model using the Vega Hatchback body, was also offered for the 1978 model year.

The Ford Pinto was introduced one day after the Vega. It was small, economical, and a top seller. Controversy over the design of the fuel system and a Ford cost benefit analysis presented to the public as specific to the Pinto destroyed the reputation of the car. The Ford Pinto engine though was successful in European Fords for twenty years, in successive mid and large European sized mainstay models of the; UK Ford Cortina, German Ford Taunus, the Ford Sierra, and the Ford Granada amongst others.

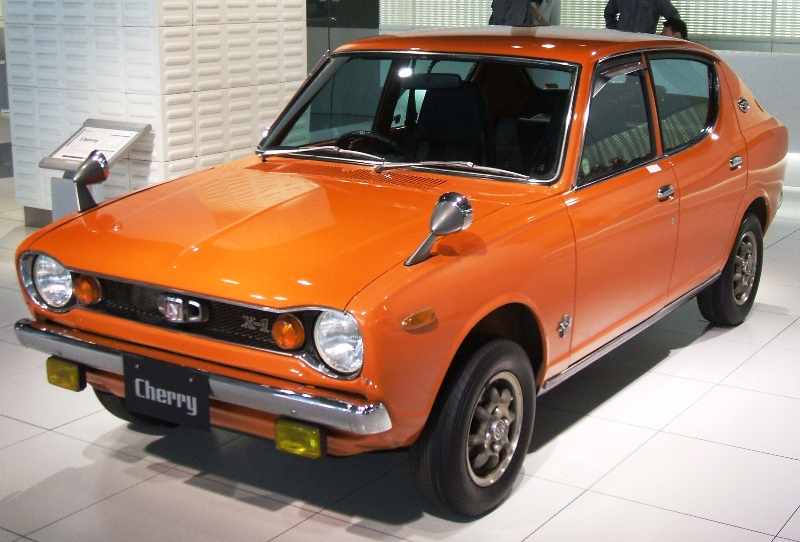
Nissan Cherry

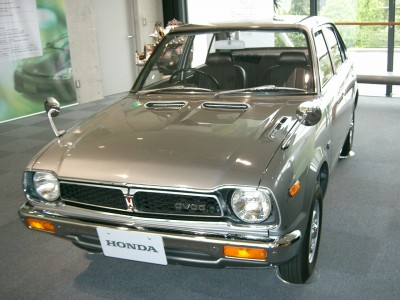
1976-77 Honda Civic Hatchback

By 1970, Nissan released their first front-wheel-drive car that was originally developed by Prince Motor Company which had merged with Nissan in 1966. This was introduced in 1970 as the Datsun/Nissan Cherry. In 1973, the Energy Crisis started, which made small fuel efficient cars more desirable, and the North American driver began exchanging their large cars for the smaller, imported compacts that cost less to fill up and were inexpensive to maintain. The Toyota Corona, the Datsun 510, the Mitsubishi Galant (a captive import from Chrysler sold as the Dodge Colt), the Subaru DL, and later the Honda Accord gave buyers increased passenger space and some luxury amenities, such as air conditioning, power steering, AM-FM radios, and even power windows and central locking without increasing the price of the vehicle. In 1972, the Honda Civic was launched, the CVCC (Compound Vortex Controlled Combustion) Stratified charge engine debuted in 1975 and was offered alongside the standard Civic engine. The CVCC engine had a head design that promoted cleaner, more efficient combustion, eliminating the need to use a Catalytic converter for the new California emission standards - nearly every other U.S. market car for that year needed exhausts with catalytic converters. The Japanese, who had previously competed on price, equipment and reliability with conservative designs, were starting to make advanced, globally competitive cars.

The Audi 50 designed by Claus Luthe was a front wheel drive supermini three door hatchback car launched in 1974 and produced until 1978, and sold only in Europe, 180,812 were built. A re-badged cheaper, lower equipment version was marketed as the Volkswagen Polo Mk1 (1975-1981) sold more than 500,000. It impacted sales of the Audi, causing production to come to an end early compared to the Polo. The Volkswagen Derby was the booted two door saloon (three-box) version of its Volkswagen Polo Mk1 supermini, between 1977 and 1981 in Europe.

Ford had sold 2 million Escorts across Europe by 1974, the year the MK2 was launched with a squarer flatter panel body re-style. The most successful market was the UK. The Escort's success was greatly helped by its numerous rallying successes in the 1970s, and the performance versions like the Escort Mexico and RS2000 that traded on that success, and provided a halo effect for the lesser models.

The Chevrolet Chevette was introduced in September 1975 and produced through to 1987. It was a successful and 'Americanized' version of the GM T platform (1973) 'world car' that was developed with Opel, GM's German subsidiary and Isuzu of Japan.

Chrysler having taken control of Simca (and Hillman in the UK) in the 1960s, as part of expansion plans to match GM and Ford, turned to their French subsidiary, when they needed to launch an American made sub-compact, to comply with federal Corporate Average Fuel Economy (CAFE) regulations that were being introduced starting with the 1978 model year cars. The replacement for the Simca 1100, the C2 project, became the (Simca) Talbot Horizon that won European Car of the Year 1978, and more than 3 million were sold in the United States as the Dodge Omni and Plymouth Horizon from 1978 to 1990. It had been re-engineered with a federal emission VW Golf 1.7L engine and MacPherson strut suspension for the U.S. market. Chrysler Europe was sold to Peugeot in 1978, due to mounting operating losses in Europe and the U.S. that required a U.S. government bailout.

Captive imports were the other response by U.S. car makers to the increase in popularity of imported economy cars in the 1970s and 1980s. These were cars bought from overseas subsidiaries or from companies in which they held a significant shareholding. GM, Ford, and Chrysler sold imports for the U.S. market. The Buick Opel, Ford Cortina, Mercury Capri, Ford Festiva, and Dodge Colt are examples.

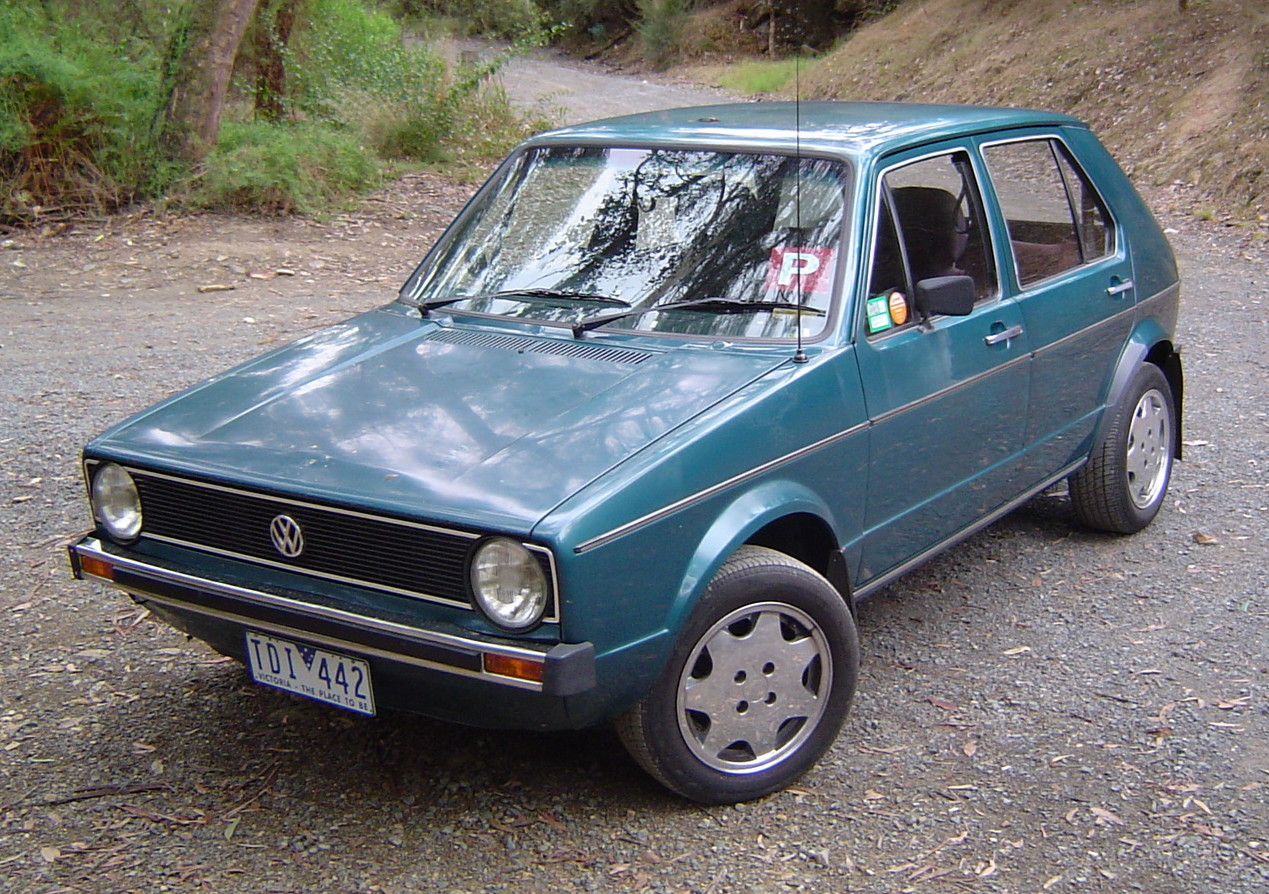
Volkswagen Golf 1976 Mk1 (Australia)

Technologies that developed during the post-war era, such as disc brakes, overhead-cam engines and radial tires, had become cheap enough to be used in economy cars at this time (radials began to be adopted in the 1950s and 1960s, and front disc brakes in the 1960s, towards the bottom of the market in Europe). This led to cars such as the 1974 Mk 1 Volkswagen Golf designed by Giorgetto Giugiaro, Fiat 128 and 1972 Honda Civic. Some previously exotic technology, electronic fuel injection, became affordable, which allowed the production of high-performance hot hatch sport compacts like the 1976 Volkswagen Golf GTI. This car combined economy of use and a practical hatchback body, with the performance and driving fun that kicked off the hot hatchback boom. Also introduced in 1976 was the 1.5 L VW Golf diesel—the first small diesel hatchback. It used new Bosch rotary mechanical diesel injection pump technology. Also in that year, Ford of Europe (produced by the merging of Ford national operations in Europe) launched their first front-wheel-drive small car, the Ford Fiesta, having gained experience from the Ford of Germany 1960s European midsized Ford Taunus P4 and Ford of Brazil Ford Corcel.

=== 1980s ===
GM Europe (Vauxhall/Opel) introduced their first European market front-wheel-drive car, the Opel Kadett D/Vauxhall Astra, Golf-sized car in 1979 by Opel in Germany and 1980 by Vauxhall in the UK.

In 1980, Fiat introduced the Giugiaro designed Mk 1 Fiat Panda. It was originally designed to be produced in China at its 1970s level of industrialisation. It was a utilitarian front-wheel-drive supermini with Fiat standard transverse engine and end-on gearbox. It featured mostly flat body panels and flat glass.

Also in 1980, the all new hatchback and front wheel drive third generation Ford Escort Mark III (Europe) was launched. Previous Escorts were saloon/sedans with front engine and rear wheel drive. In 1981 Ford launched the American version of the Ford Escort.

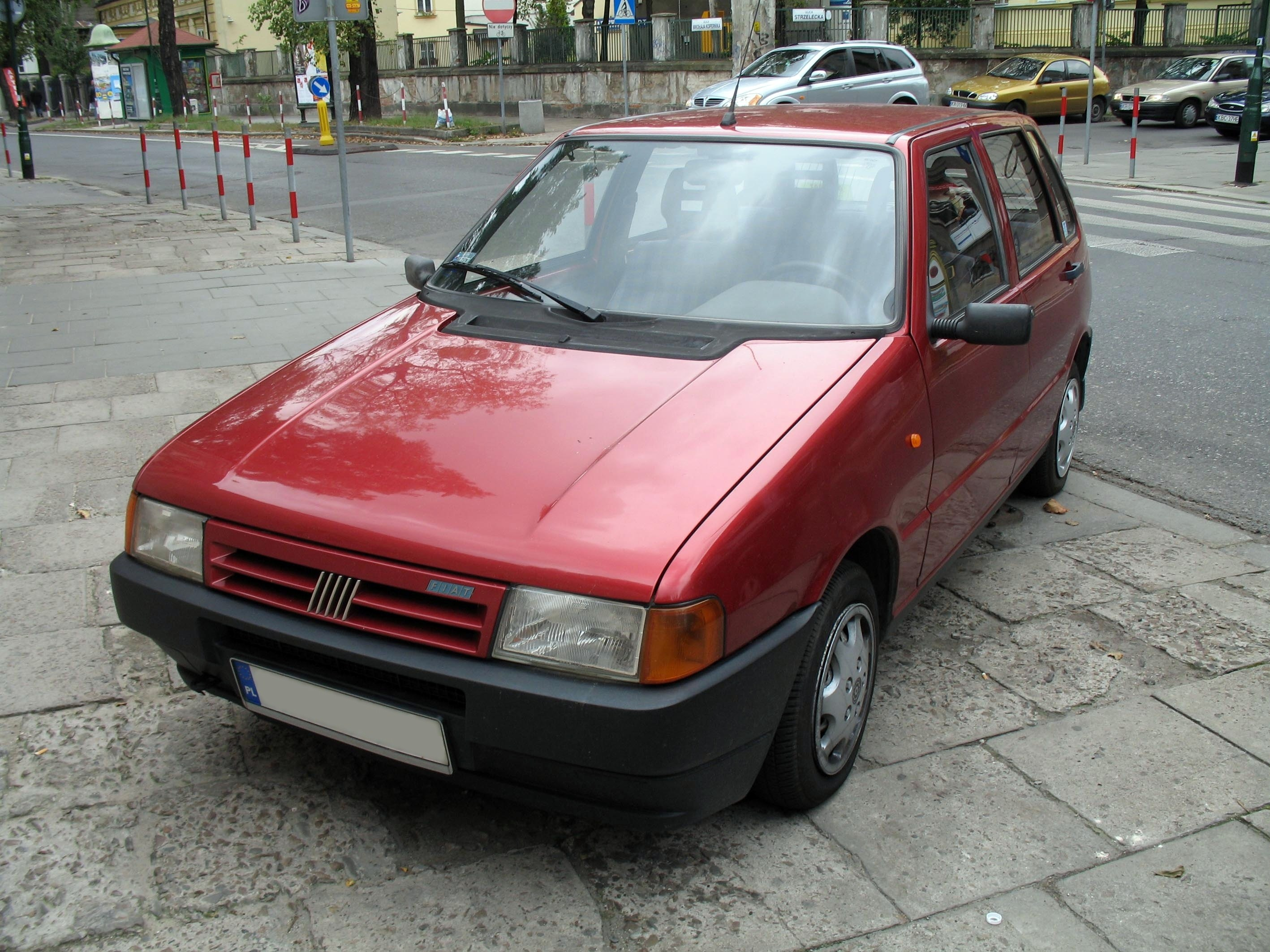
1990-95 Fiat Uno Cd 0.30

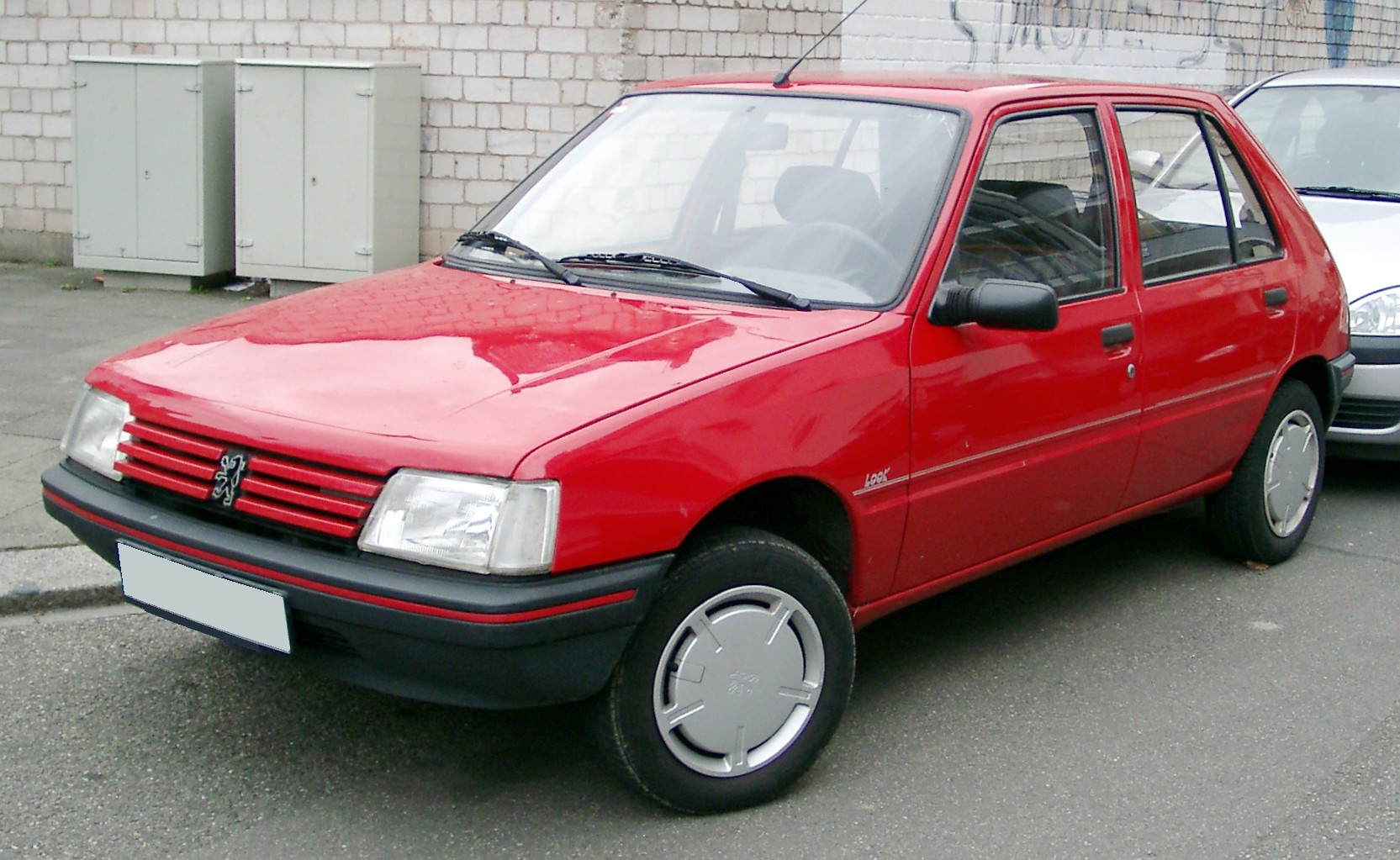
Peugeot 205

In 1982 GM launched their first front-wheel-drive supermini, the Opel Corsa/Vauxhall Nova in Europe.

In 1983 Fiat launched the next step forward in small car design, the Fiat Uno. It was designed by Giorgetto Giugiaro's ItalDesign. The tall, square body utilising a Kamm tail achieved a drag coefficient of 0.34, and it won much praise for an airy interior space and fuel economy. It incorporated many packaging lessons learnt from Giugiaro's 1978 Lancia Megagamma concept car, (the first modern people carrier-MPV-mini-van)—but miniaturised. Its tall car, high-seating packaging is imitated by every small car today. It showed that not just low sleek cars could be aerodynamic, but small boxy well packaged cars could be too. It was voted Car of the Year in 1984.

Also in 1983 Peugeot launched the Pininfarina-styled Peugeot 205. While not as radical as the Uno in body design, it was also very aerodynamic. It was the first European supermini with a diesel engine - the XUD. It provided performance of a 1.4 L petrol with economy - 55 miles per imperial gallon (5.1 L/100 km; 46 mpg_{‑US}) - that was better than the base 1 L petrol version. It could, like most diesel engines, last for several hundred thousand miles with regular servicing. It was, along with the larger (also XUD powered) Citroën BX, the beginning of the start of the boom in diesel sales in Europe. The 205 GTI was as popular as the Golf GTI in Europe. The 205 was named "Car of the Decade" in the UK, by CAR magazine in 1990.

In the US Chevrolet offered three new small economy cars in the 1980s to replace the Chevette: the Chevrolet Sprint, a three-cylinder Suzuki-built hatchback, The Chevrolet Spectrum built by Isuzu and the Chevrolet Nova built by NUMMI in California, a GM-Toyota joint venture.

=== 1990s ===
Chevrolet offered the Geo brand in the US in the 1990s featuring the Suzuki-built Geo Metro (marketed as the Suzuki Swift in Europe, Suzuki Cultus in Japan, and Holden Barina in Australia), the Isuzu-built Storm, and the NUMMI-built Prizm.

In Europe in 1993, Fiat launched the boxy and conservatively styled but very well packaged front wheel drive Fiat Cinquecento that could accommodate four adults that was only slightly larger than an Austin Mini. It eventually replaced the first Fiat Panda and also the aged rear engined rear wheel drive 1970s Fiat 126, as the smallest car in the Fiat range. But the real breakthrough in small car design was the 1993 Renault Twingo which was a revolution in styling by being the first 'one box' small car to reach production. The early pre-production Citroën AX supermini launched in 1987 was a 'monobox' design, but the production version was much more conservative after negative reactions in focus groups. Both had the interior space of a much larger car. The Twingo and Cinquecento relaunched the city car market in Europe - for decades the only competitors in this market were the Austin Mini and the Polish built Fiat 126 (developed from the 1950s Fiat 500).

=== Economy cars since 2000 ===
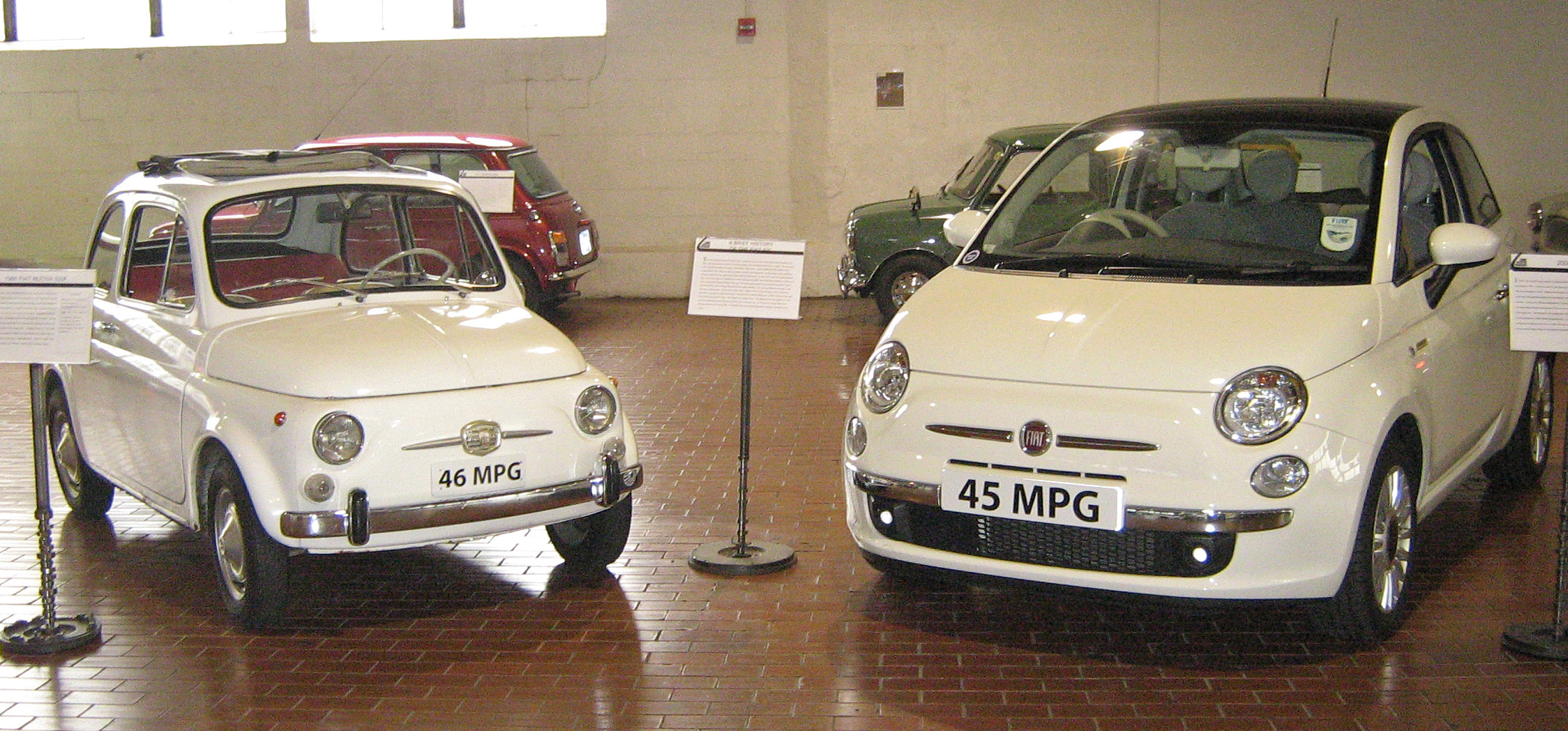
1966 and 2007 Fiat 500. The new 500 is larger, safer and more fuel efficient than the original.

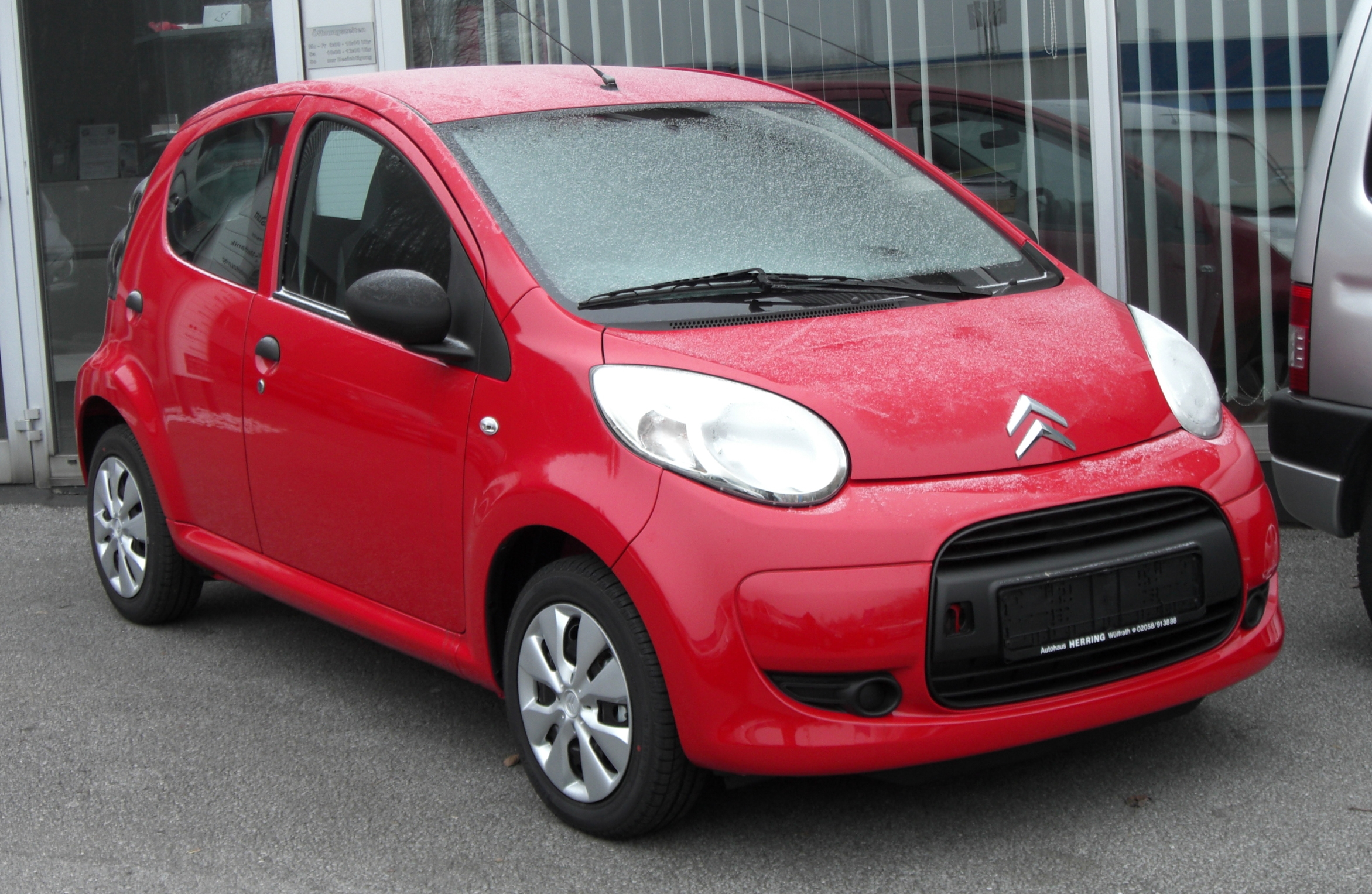
Citroën C1

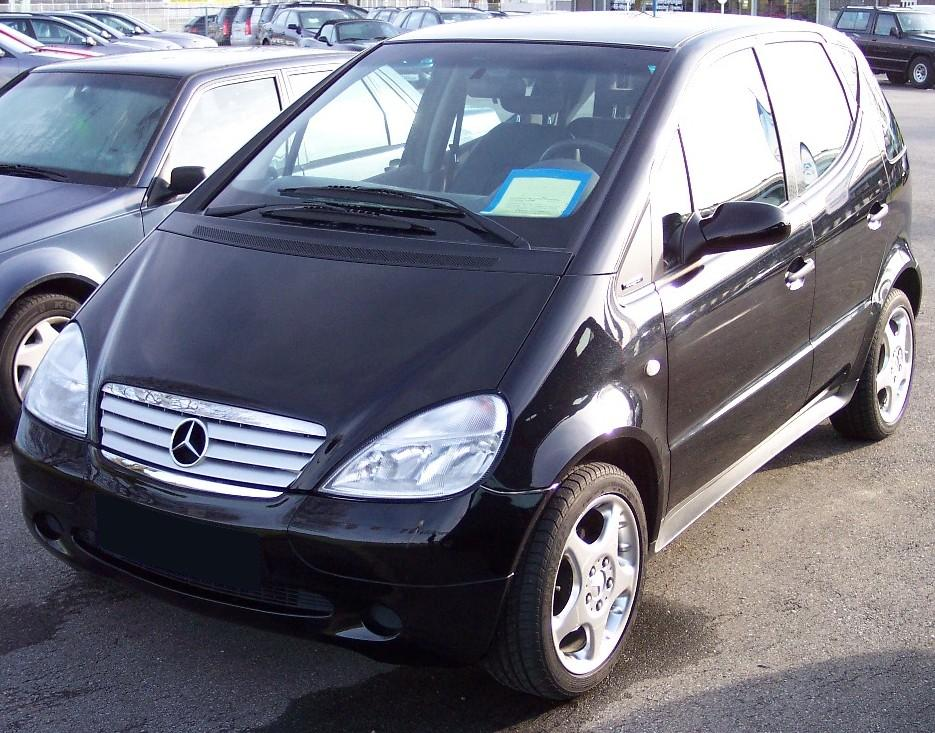
Mercedes-Benz A-Class

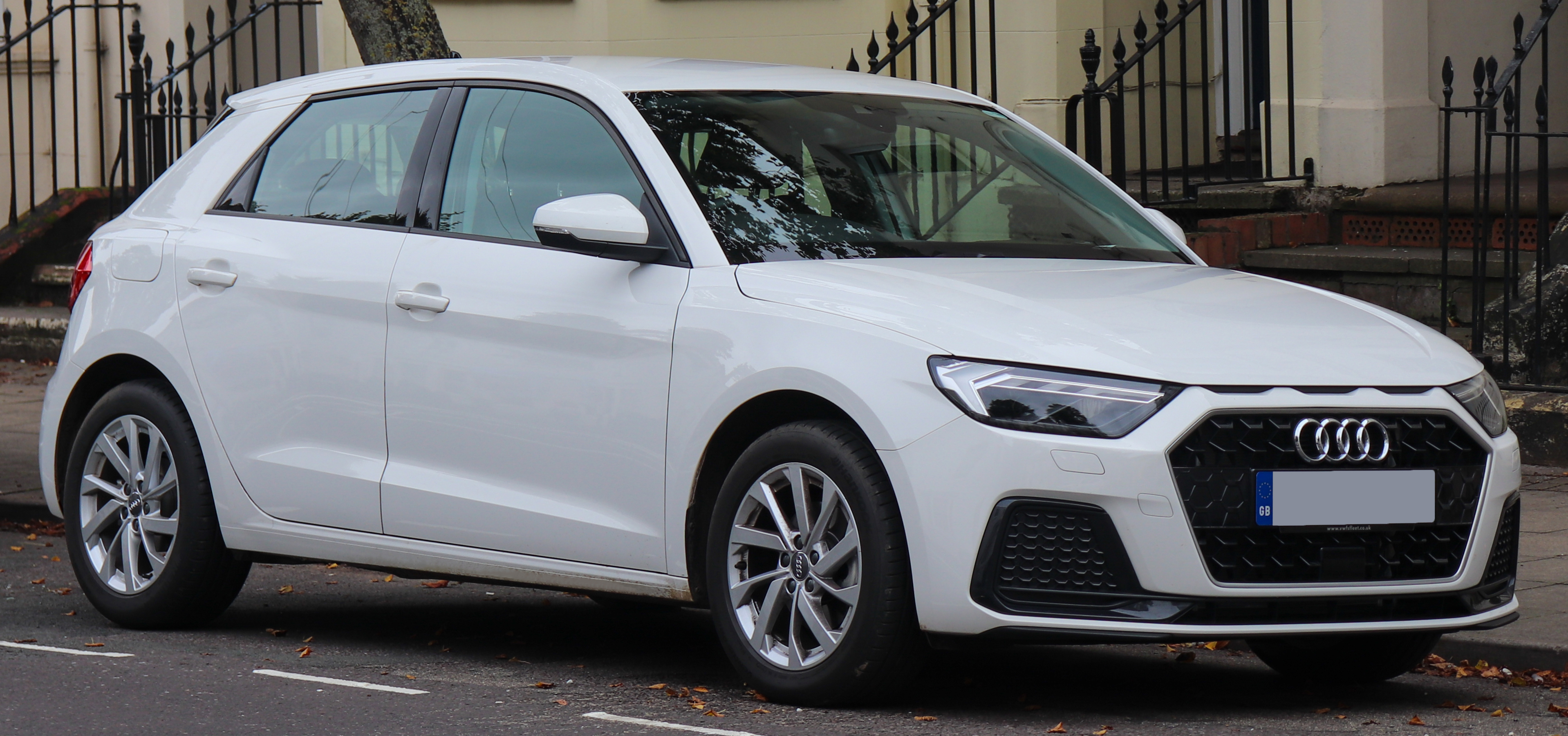
Audi A1

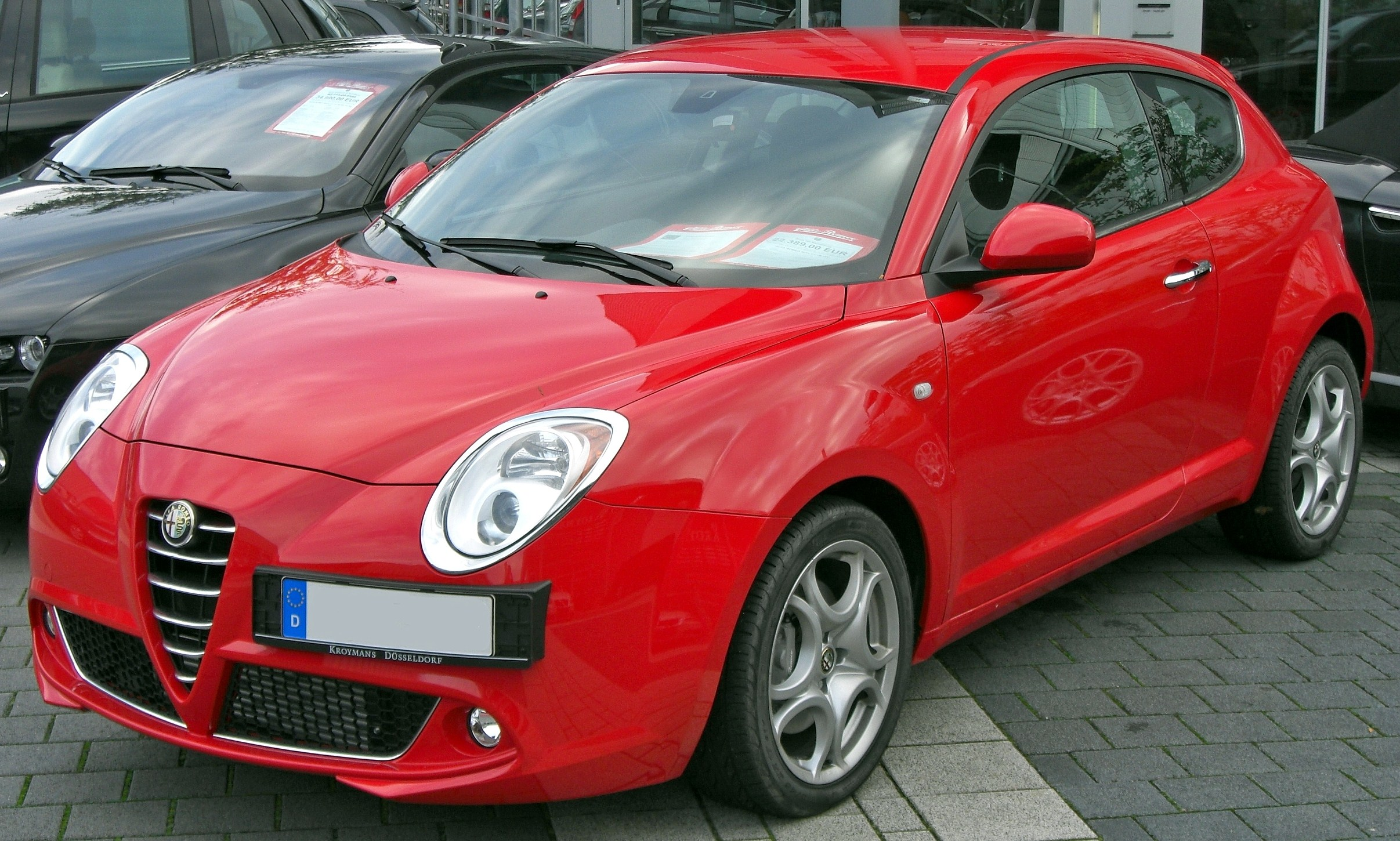
Alfa Romeo MiTo

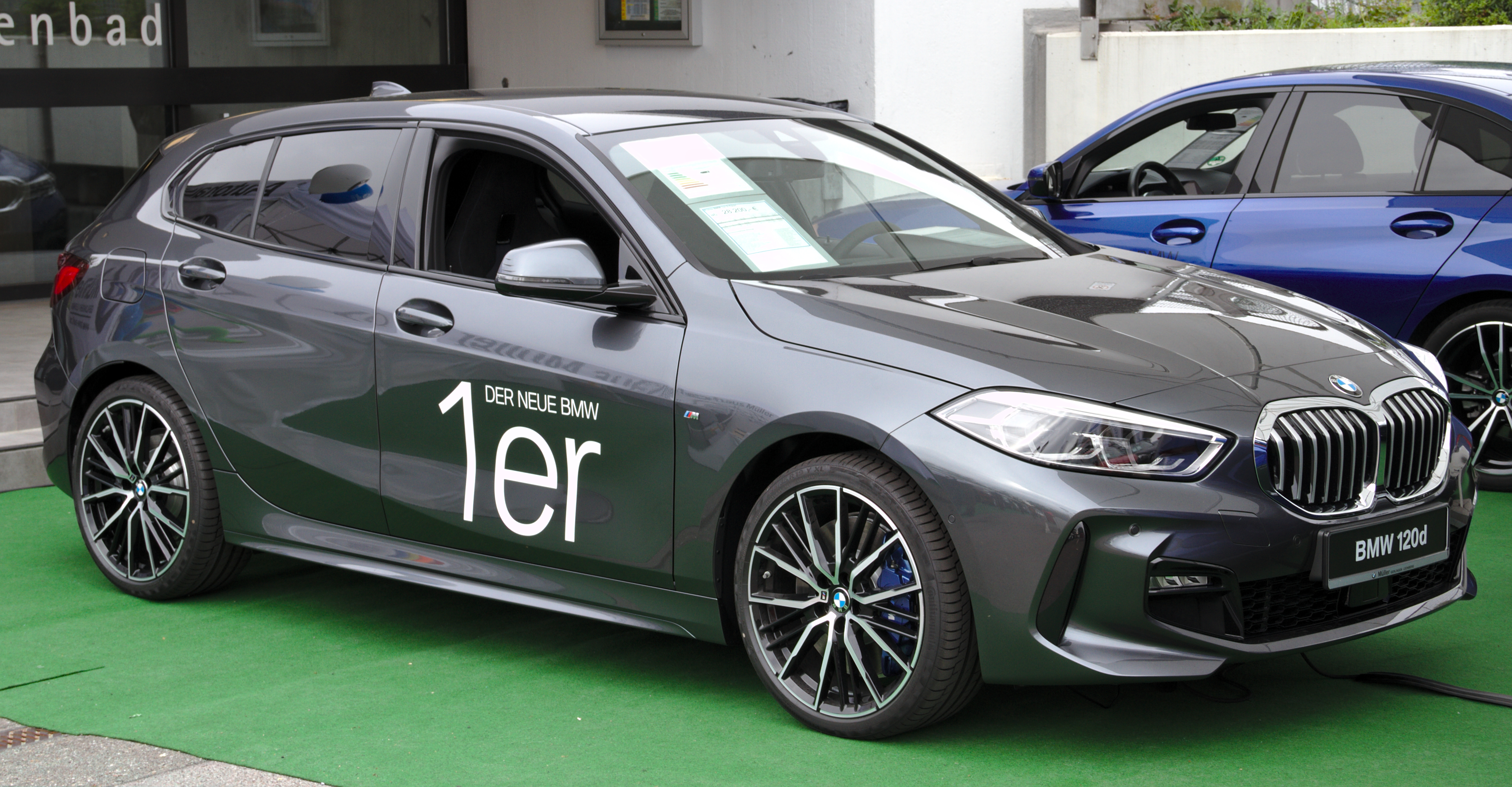
BMW 1 Series

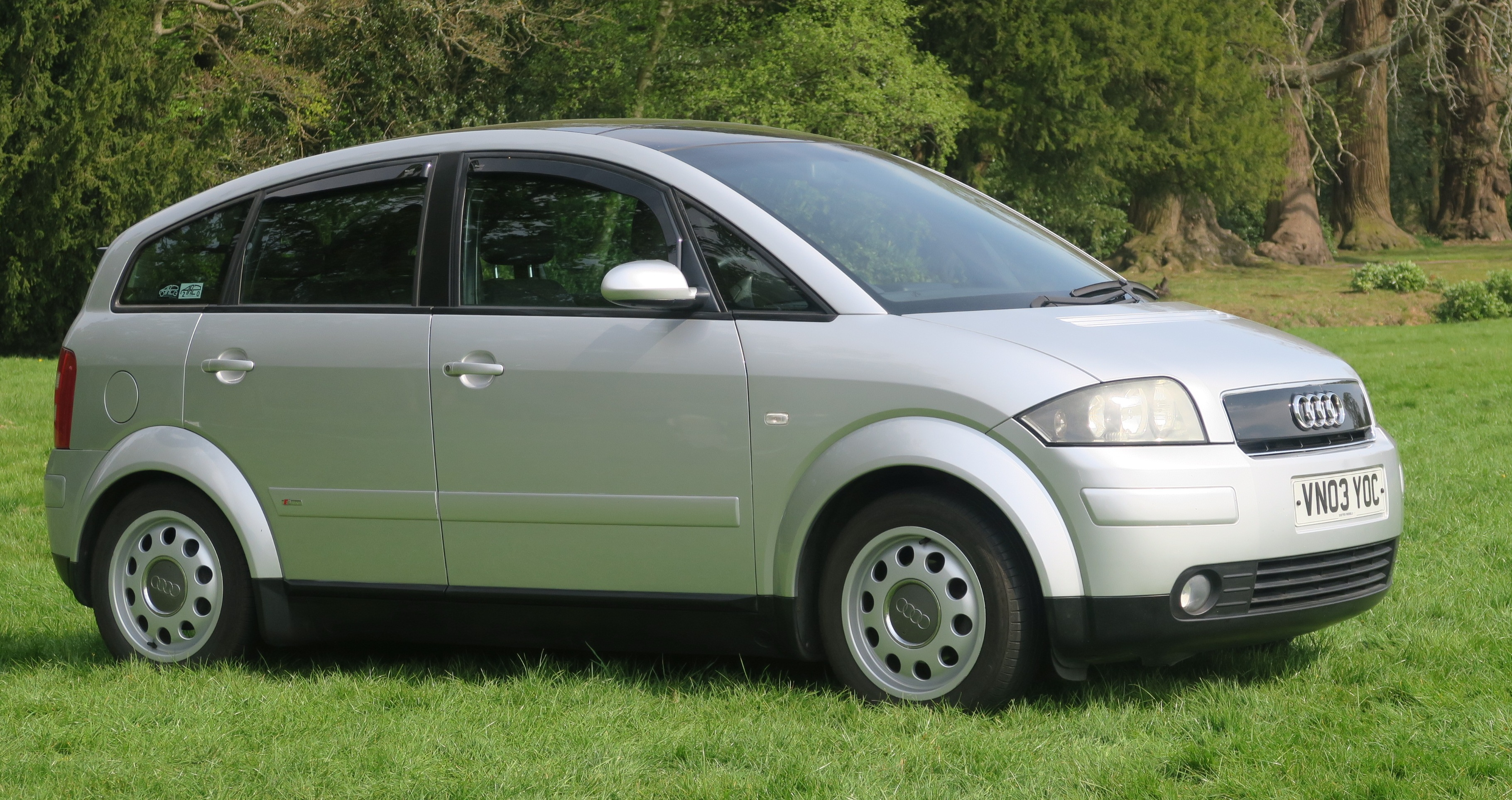
Audi A2

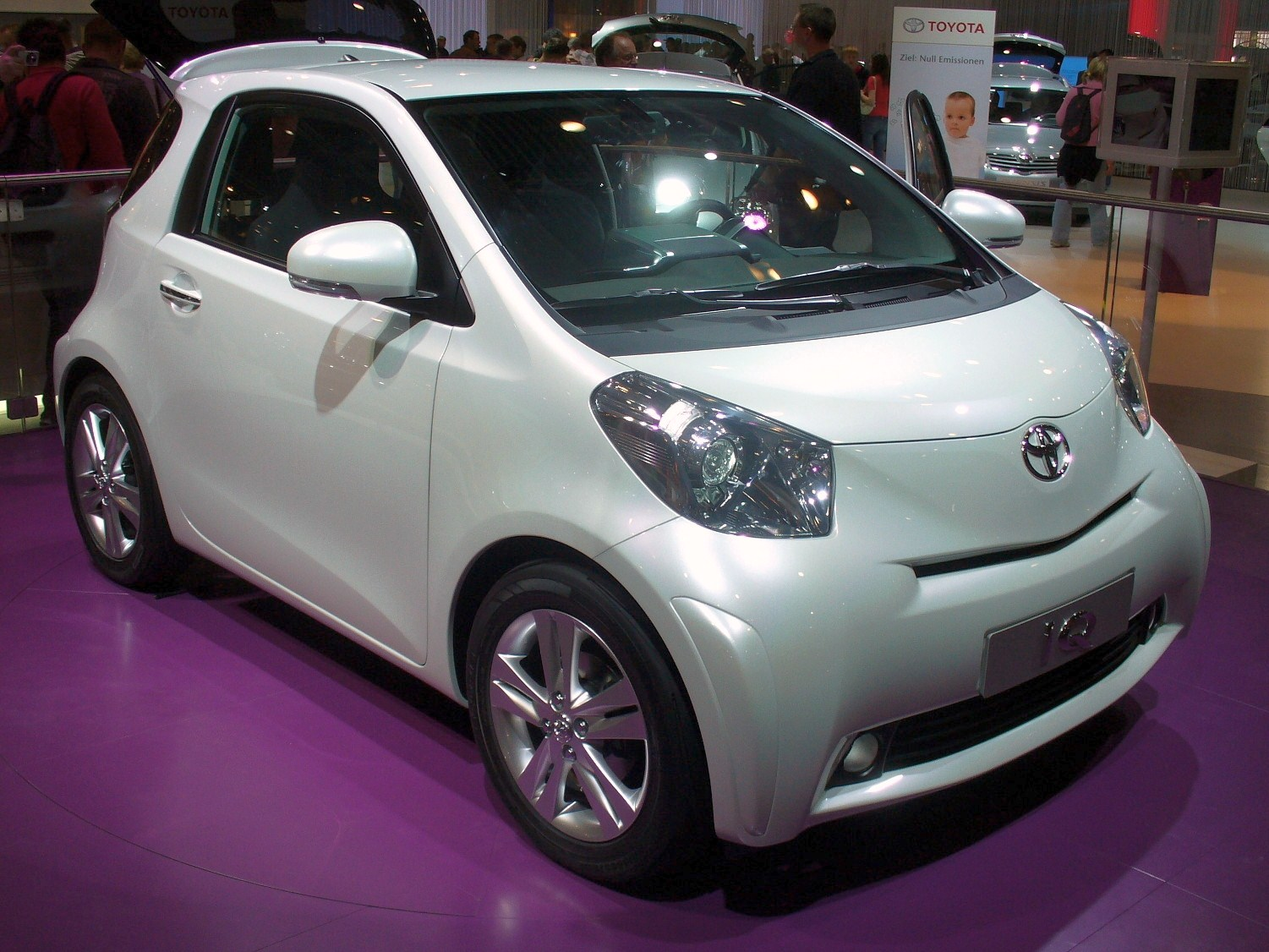
Toyota iQ production version

Today economy cars have specialised into market niches. The small city car, the inexpensive-to-run but not necessarily very small general economy car, and the performance derivatives that capitalise on light weight of the cars on which they are based. Some models that started as economy cars such as the Volkswagen Golf and Toyota Corolla, have increased in size and moved upmarket over several generations, and their makers have added smaller new models in their original market niches. The 2003 Volkswagen Golf Mk5 had put on so much weight, that some models weigh the same as a Volvo 200 Series. The supermini 2002 Volkswagen Polo Mk4 was longer and wider than the 1970s Volkswagen Golf Mk1. Gordon Murray the Formula 1 and Mclaren F1 designer, said when designing his new Murray T.25 city car in 2010: "Today with all the promises of hydrogen and hybrids and electric cars, if you could take ten percent out of the weight of every car, the effect in the next ten years would be more than that of all the hybrids and electric cars on the planet."

The city car market in Europe from the 1990s has seen increased competition, with the market split between standard and 'designer' city cars that are sold for a premium. These cars are at the lower end of supermini size or smaller. Standard city cars include the Toyota Yaris, Citroën C1/Peugeot 107/Toyota Aygo (built in the same factory), Fiat Panda, Kia Picanto, Chevrolet Matiz, Volkswagen Fox, Mitsubishi Colt, Volkswagen Lupo, and 2011 Volkswagen Up. The 'designer' city car became increasingly popular in Europe in the 1990s. The first car of this kind was a limited success, the 1985 Lancia Y10, because it had been hampered by its poor ride, from being based on the original utilitarian Fiat Panda. Also, Lancia was a dying brand in the UK at this time. The 1993 Renault Twingo and Ford Ka in 1996, marked an upsurge in sales for this niche. The Ka was to be launched along with the mid-1990s Fiesta with the innovative Australian two stroke Orbital engine, but tightening emissions laws meant that it was launched with an updated Ford Kent engine instead. This was followed by the innovative engineering designs; Mercedes-Benz A-Class with an under floor engine, the two seater rear engined Smart ForTwo, and the aluminium bodied Audi A2 which in its most aerodynamic form only achieved a drag coefficient of Cd=0.25. Sales really took off with the 2001 BMW Mini with its modern but conventional front wheel drive engineering and re-interpretation of the classic Austin Mini styling. This has sold well in other markets including North America. Other cars of this type include the Mitsubishi Colt-based Smart Forfour, VW Polo based Audi A1, Fiat Panda based Fiat Nuova 500, Citroën C3 based Citroën DS3, and Fiat Grande Punto based Alfa Romeo MiTo. The Toyota iQ, designed in France, went on sale in January 2009 in the UK. It is a competitor for the Smart ForTwo but with occasional rear seats. It follows the Issigonis philosophy of packaging, with innovations including a flat under floor fuel tank and specially located steering rack and final drive unit to maximise floor space for passengers. It seats four adults in a car 2.985 m (117.5 in) long, 1.680 m (66.1 in) wide, and 1.5 m (59.1 in) tall, and achieves 65.69 mpg_{‑imp} (4.300 L/100 km; 54.70 mpg_{‑US}) with a 99 g/km CO_{2} rating. It also achieved the top Euro NCAP 5/5 stars safety rating.

A development in recent years in Europe, has been the launch of small MPVs/people carriers. This is a development of the Giorgetto Giugiaro tall car, high-seating packaging innovation first used in the Fiat Uno. The niche first emerged in Japan with the 1993 Suzuki Wagon R Keicar class car. This was sold by GM in Europe from 2000 as the Vauxhall/Opel Agila. This was followed by the slightly larger supermini based cars like the Renault Modus, Citroën C3 Picasso, Fiat Idea, Nissan Note, and the Vauxhall/Opel Meriva that is also produced in Brazil. Their tall packaging designs offer the interior space of a larger car. The higher seating increases visibility for the driver that is useful in urban driving. They also make it easier to get in and out, which is useful for those with personal mobility problems, such as the elderly and the disabled.

The conflicting design goals for economy cars – small size with maximum usable interior space, low cost and light weight with acceptable safety performance (light cars have a higher ratio of unsprung suspension mass to sprung mass, which affects ride quality) and the need for light materials with acceptable durability – continue to stimulate innovative development. Technology improvements such as electronic engine management, adoption of four valves per cylinder, variable valve timing, direct injection of petrol/Gasoline and diesel, hybrid power, and smoother, more powerful diesel engines with very high pressure electronic injection, have dramatically improved fuel economy and performance and lowered emissions. The latest technologies to improve efficiency are engine downsizing and automatic engine stop-start. Automatic engine stop-start systems like VWs BlueMotion, shut the engine down when the car is stopped to reduce idling emissions and boost economy, and it is now mandatory not to idle unnecessarily in cities in Germany. It is an updated version of the 1980s VW 'Formel E' system that was developed into the 1990s VW 'Ecomatic' system. The application of turbo-charging to downsized engines is one way to achieve efficiency benefits into fuel economy and emission benefits instead of for performance. The recent Fiat 'Multiair' system, is an electro-hydraulic development of variable valve timing that allows the engine management computer to control valve timing, improving engine efficiency, giving better torque, power, economy, and emissions. Safety design is a particular challenge in a small, lightweight car. This is an area where Renault has been particularly successful. Sport compacts and hot hatches have developed into their own competitive genre. Although their economy has been compromised, these models offer higher performance because of the lightness of the platforms that they are based upon.

As an alternative to manual synchromesh gearboxes, automatic continuously variable transmission (CVT) gearboxes are optional on some economy cars, such as Audi, Honda, and the MINI ONE and MINI Cooper. Tata Motors from India, recently announced that it too would use a variomatic transmission in its US$2,500 Nano. CVT application to economy cars was pioneered by Fiat, Ford, and Van Doorne in the 1980s. Rather than the pulled rubber drive belts as used in the past by DAF, the modern transmission is made much more durable by the use of electronic control and steel link belts pushed by their pulleys.

A difference between the North American car market and the markets of Europe and Japan is the price of fuel. Fuel is heavily taxed and therefore relatively costly in most first-world markets outside North America; fuel is about two and a half times the price in the UK than the U.S. Fuel costs are also a much higher proportion of income, due to generally higher wages and lower living costs in the U.S. Only during occasional fuel price spikes such as those of 1973, 1979–81, and 2008-9 have North American drivers been motivated to seek levels of fuel economy considered ordinary outside North America.

The growth of developing countries has also created a new market for inexpensive new cars. Unlike in the postwar period this demand has not been met by utilitarian models, but advanced 'peoples' cars'. Adaptation of standard or obsolete models from the first world has been the norm. Production of car models superseded in first-world markets is often moved to cost-sensitive markets like South Africa and Brazil; the Citi Golf is an example.

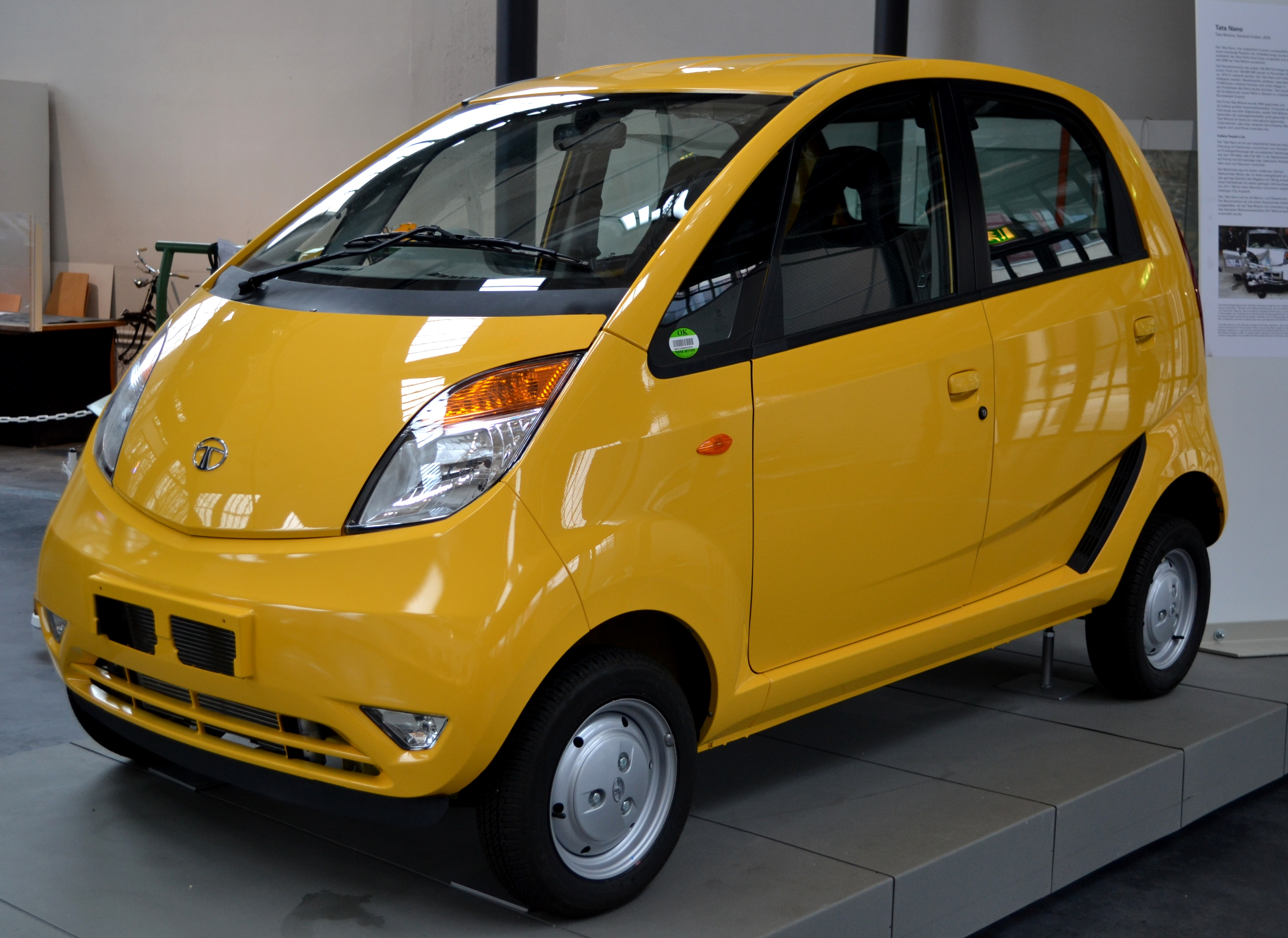
Tata Nano

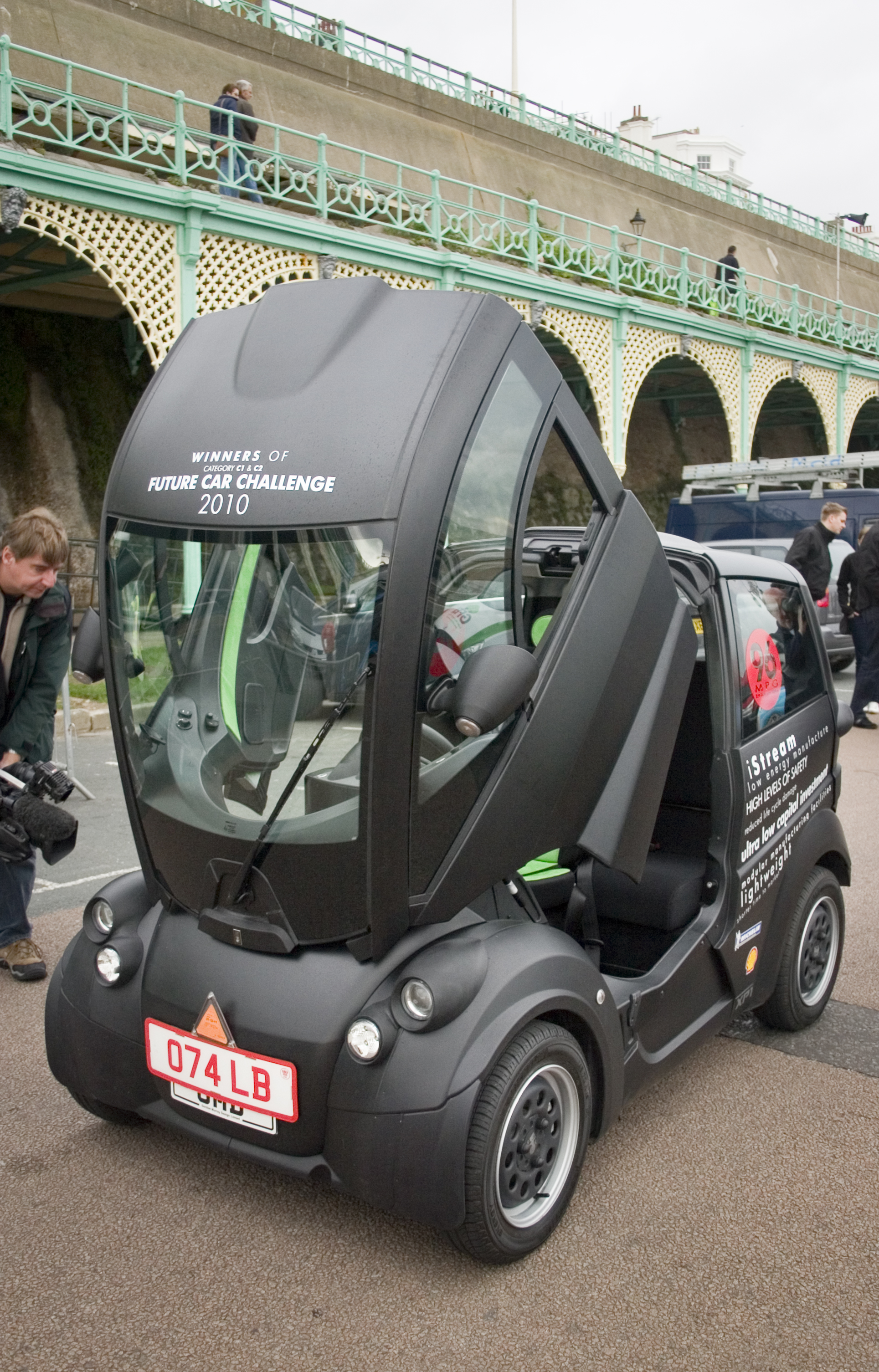
Gordon Murray Design T.25

Some mainstream European auto makers have developed models specifically for developing countries, such as the Fiat Palio, Volkswagen Gol and Dacia Logan. Renault has teamed up with India's Mahindra and Mahindra to produce a low-cost car in the range of US$2,500 to US$3,000. The Tata Nano launched in January 2008, in India by Tata Motors, was claimed by Tata to be the world's cheapest car at US$2,500. The Nano, like the 1950s Fiat 500, has a rear engine and was styled by Italians. It is designed to get whole families off scooters and onto four wheels. The Nano fell short of the sales projections of Tata. Like the US market rejection of the Austin 7 in the 1920s, many Indian consumers felt the car was too compromised to be acceptable, and it faced strong price competition from Indian motorcycle producers. Production ended in 2018. The Tata Indica that was formerly sold in Europe as the City Rover until the 2005 collapse of Rover, sold poorly in the UK as it was overpriced for a basic car.

The narrow profit margins of economy cars can cause financial instability for their manufacturers. Historically, Volkswagen in the 1970s and Ford in the 1920s almost collapsed because of their one model economy car business strategy. Ford was saved by the Model A and Volkswagen was saved by the Golf. Ford started the Mercury and Lincoln brands to diversify its product range. VW moved away from the narrow profit margins of economy cars, by expanding its range so that now it spans from very small city cars like the Volkswagen Up to Audis and Bentleys, and it also owns SEAT and Škoda.

China has become one of the fastest growing car markets, recently overtaking the U.S. as the largest producer of cars in the world. It is followed by India which specialises in inexpensive, simple cars.

India is becoming a global outsourcing production centre for small cars. The Suzuki Alto and Hyundai i10 are already being exported to Europe from India. In March 2010 at Chennai, the Renault-Nissan Alliance opened a US$990 million plant to produce 400,000 units per year at full production. The first vehicle to be produced at the plant will be the new Nissan Micra, for the Indian market as well as for export to over 100 countries in Europe, the Middle East and Africa. Production of the Micra has been re-located from the UK and other developed countries. In 2011, the plant will start production of the Renault Koleos and Fluence, for the Indian market based on the same platform. The Maruti version of the Suzuki Swift is also produced in India.

Gordon Murray the Formula 1 and Mclaren F1 designer, has pointed out the difficulty of making economy cars cost-efficient. His solution is a laser cut tubular steel space-frame chassis built with an automated tube mill, braced with bonded low-cost composite sheets that would be a cheaper and greener means of production. Murray's 'iStream' simplifies each process with an eighty percent smaller factory with lower cost production, making light weight efficient cars. There are no sheet metal presses, spot welders or paint plants. It would be built local to its market. Murray was reported to be negotiating production licences. The T25 and T27 were projected to be available in 2016.

== See also ==
- Fuel economy in automobiles
- Automobile costs

== Bibliography ==
- Sloan, Alfred P. (1964), McDonald, John (ed.), My Years with General Motors, Garden City, NY, US: Doubleday, LCCN 64011306, OCLC 802024. Republished in 1990 with a new introduction by Peter Drucker (ISBN 978-0385042352).
