= Typ =

Typ is German for “type” and is sometimes used internationally, e.g. to refer to automobile models (for example: Volkswagen Polo Mk1, known as Typ 86; SEAT Arosa (Typ 6H); Škoda Felicia (Typ 791), etc.). typ or typ. is also short for "typical(-ly)"

TYP or typ may refer to:

- TYP, an Israeli musical band
- Kuku-Thaypan language (Australia), ISO 639-3 code
