= Volkswagen Polo Mk1 =

Volkswagen Polo Mk1 (86)
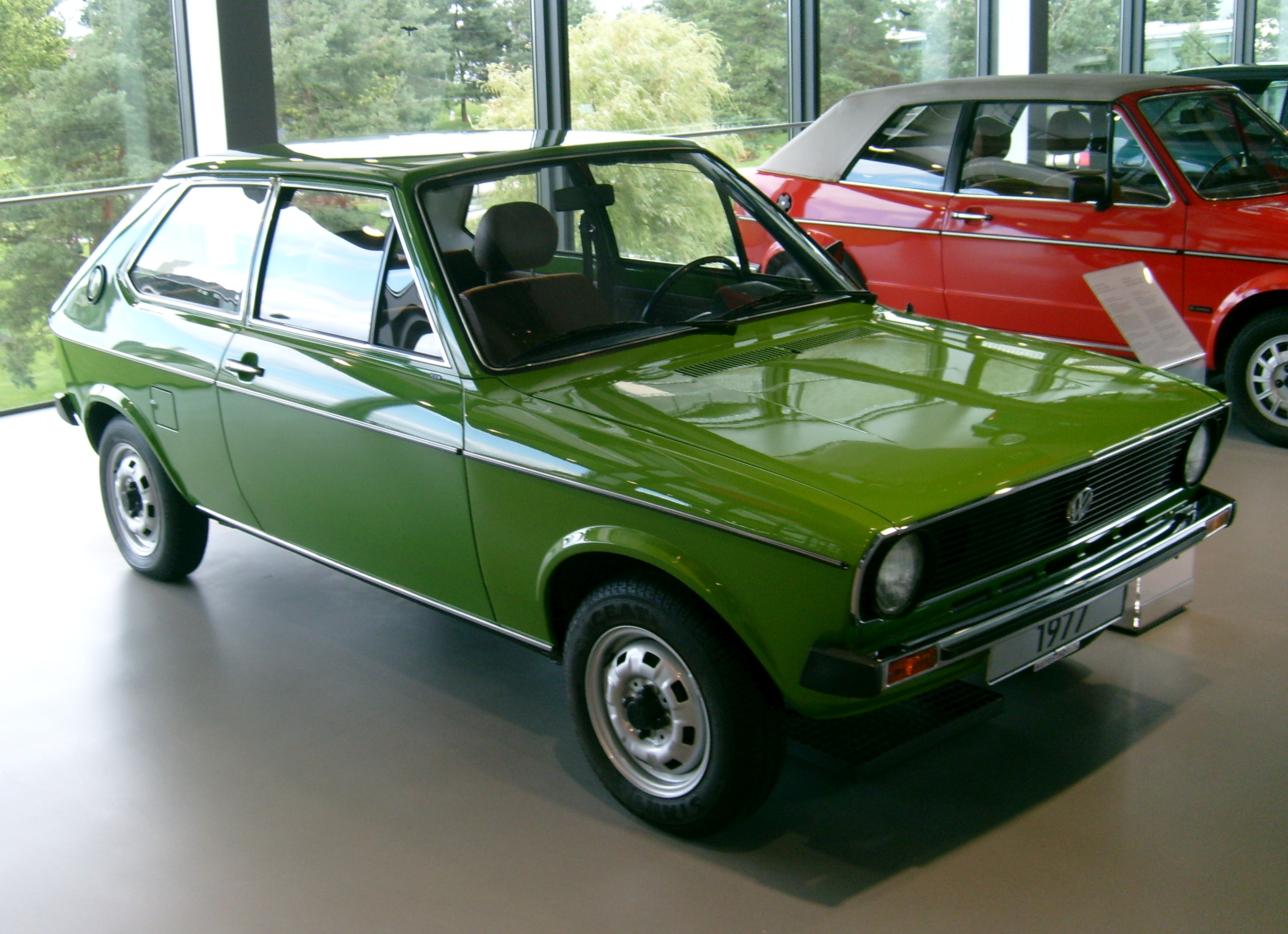

Overview
- Manufacturer: Volkswagen
- Also called: Volkswagen Derby (saloon); Volkswagen MiniGolf (Romania)
- Production: March 1975 – October 1981
- Assembly: Germany: Wolfsburg
- Designer: Marcello Gandini at Bertone

Body and chassis
- Class: Supermini (B)
- Body style: 3-door hatchback 2-door saloon
- Platform: Volkswagen Group A01
- Related: Audi 50

Powertrain
- Engine: 771 cc HE I4; 895 cc HA I4; 1043 cc GL I4; 1093 cc HB/HC I4; 1272 cc HJ/HH I4
- Transmission: 4-speed manual

Dimensions
- Wheelbase: 2,335 mm (91.9 in)

Chronology
- Successor: Polo Mk2

The Volkswagen Polo Mk1 (sometimes written in Roman numerals as Mark I) is the first generation of the Volkswagen Polo supermini. It was produced from 1975 until 1981.

== Polo Mark 1 (1975–1979) ==
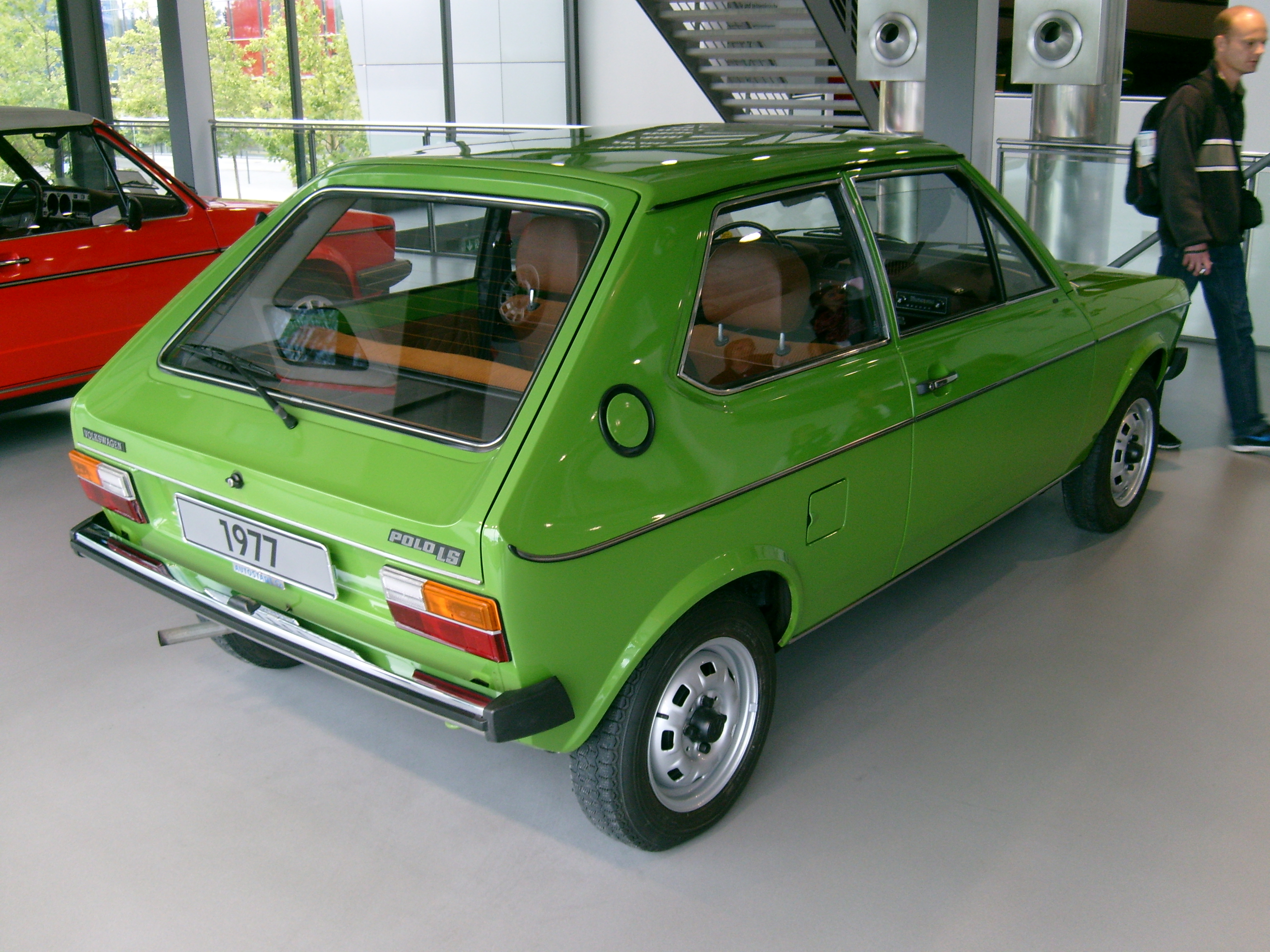
1977 Volkswagen Polo LS rear

Volkswagen Polo Mk1
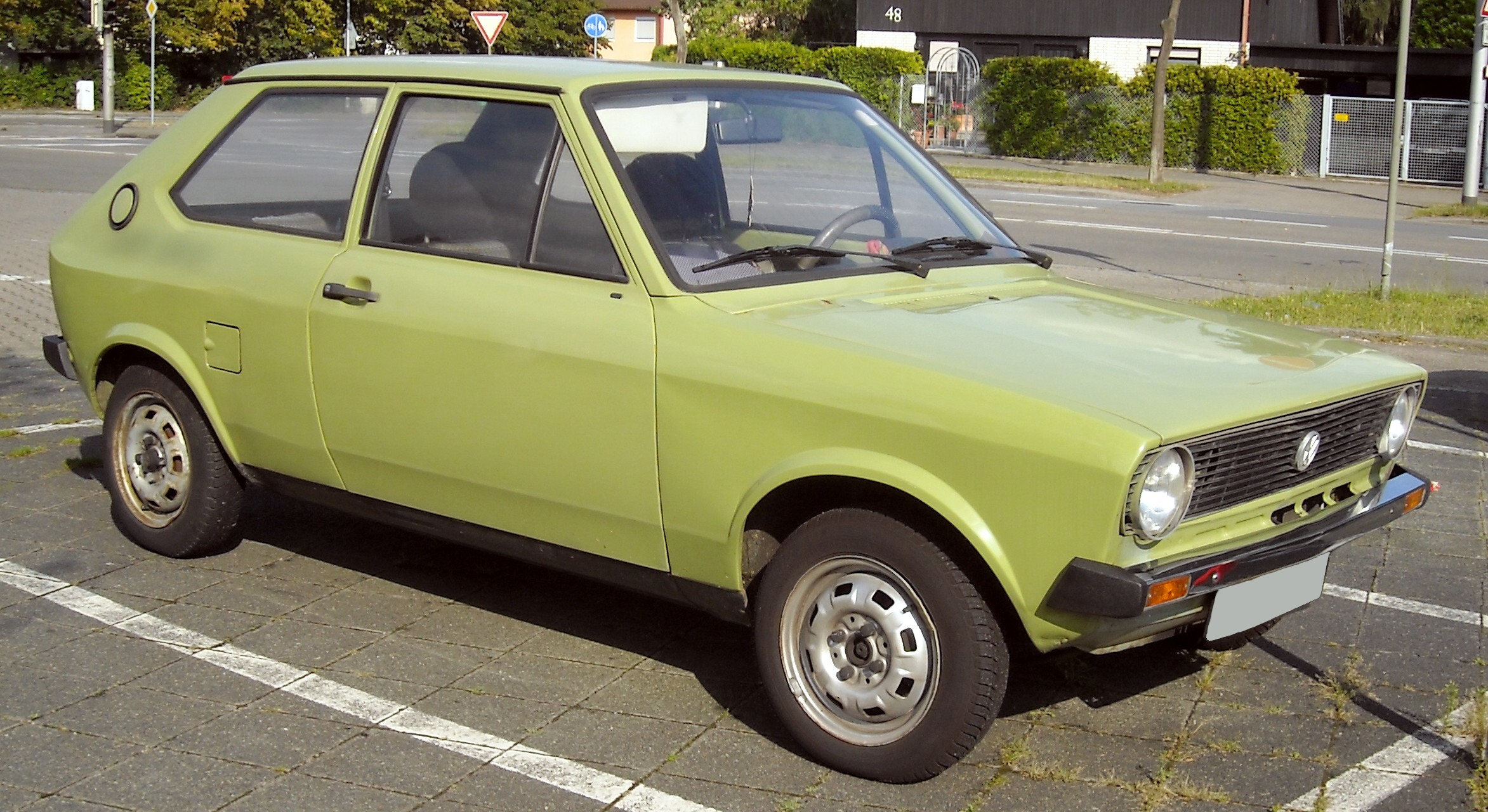

Overview
- Also called: Volkswagen Derby
- Production: 1975–1979

Body and chassis
- Body style: 3-door hatchback 2-door saloon

Chronology
- Successor: Polo Mk1F

The original Polo (known internally as the Typ 86), a rebadged version of the Audi 50, was introduced in 1975 on mainland Europe and was launched in the UK and the Isle of Man in 1976. The differences between the Audi and VW models were minor, with the Polo being cheaper and much more basic. The two cars were initially sold alongside each other, but the Audi 50 never sold as well, and was withdrawn in 1978.

The manufacturer let it be known that Bertone had been involved in the styling of the Polo and its Audi sibling, although the car was essentially an in-house Audi design, with the Italian design studio's contribution restricted to the circular extractor vent cover at the base of the C pillar, and the small "flick-up" at the rear end of the waist line.

The Polo was manufactured at the Volkswagen plant in Wolfsburg. In 1977, the Derby saloon was released, which was simply a Polo, identical to the hatchback from the C-pillar forward, with a large boot attached (an old Audi proposal, but never sold by this brand).

When first on sale the range topping car, the LS model, featured the 50 PS (37 kW) 1043 cc engine found in the Audi 50. Other specifications included parking lights, rear wash wipe, sun visors, chromed bumpers and 4.5J X 13" wheels. The N model was the basic starting spec lacking many of the features of the LS. In 1979 the GLS was introduced, replacing the LS as the range-topping car; specification upgrades included chrome headlight and grille surrounds, sunroof, a cigarette lighter and chrome wheel trims.

895 cc, producing 40 bhp (30 kW; 41 PS), 1093 cc, and 1272 cc engines were used, with the smaller one used only in the Polo hatchback, and the 1272 cc only in the Derby, Audi 50, and the rare Polo GT. Different levels of compression were used on each size to achieve different power outputs, and the variations are numerous, often differing depending on the country of sale, ranging from 34 to 60 PS (26 to 44 kW). For Sweden and certain other markets a version with a 771 cc engine was developed for the 1976 model year, as new very strict emissions regulations were introduced but did not apply to engines of less than 0.8 L (49 cu in). The Swedish model was discontinued after 1977, as sales of the underpowered car were sluggish, but the HE engine option continued to be mentioned in period journals (also for the Derby) until the Mark I was replaced in 1981.

=== Powertrain ===
The Polo Mk1 was available with the following engines:

- 895 cc, straight 4 petrol (hatchback only)
- 1,093 cc straight 4 petrol, 37 kW (50 hp)
- 1,272 cc, straight 4 petrol, (Polo GT, Derby sedan models, Audi 50 only)

Different levels of compression were used on each size to achieve different power outputs, and the variations are numerous, often differing depending on the country of sale, ranging from 26 to 44 kW (35 to 59 hp).

== Polo Mark 1 facelift (1979–1981) ==
Volkswagen Polo Mk1F
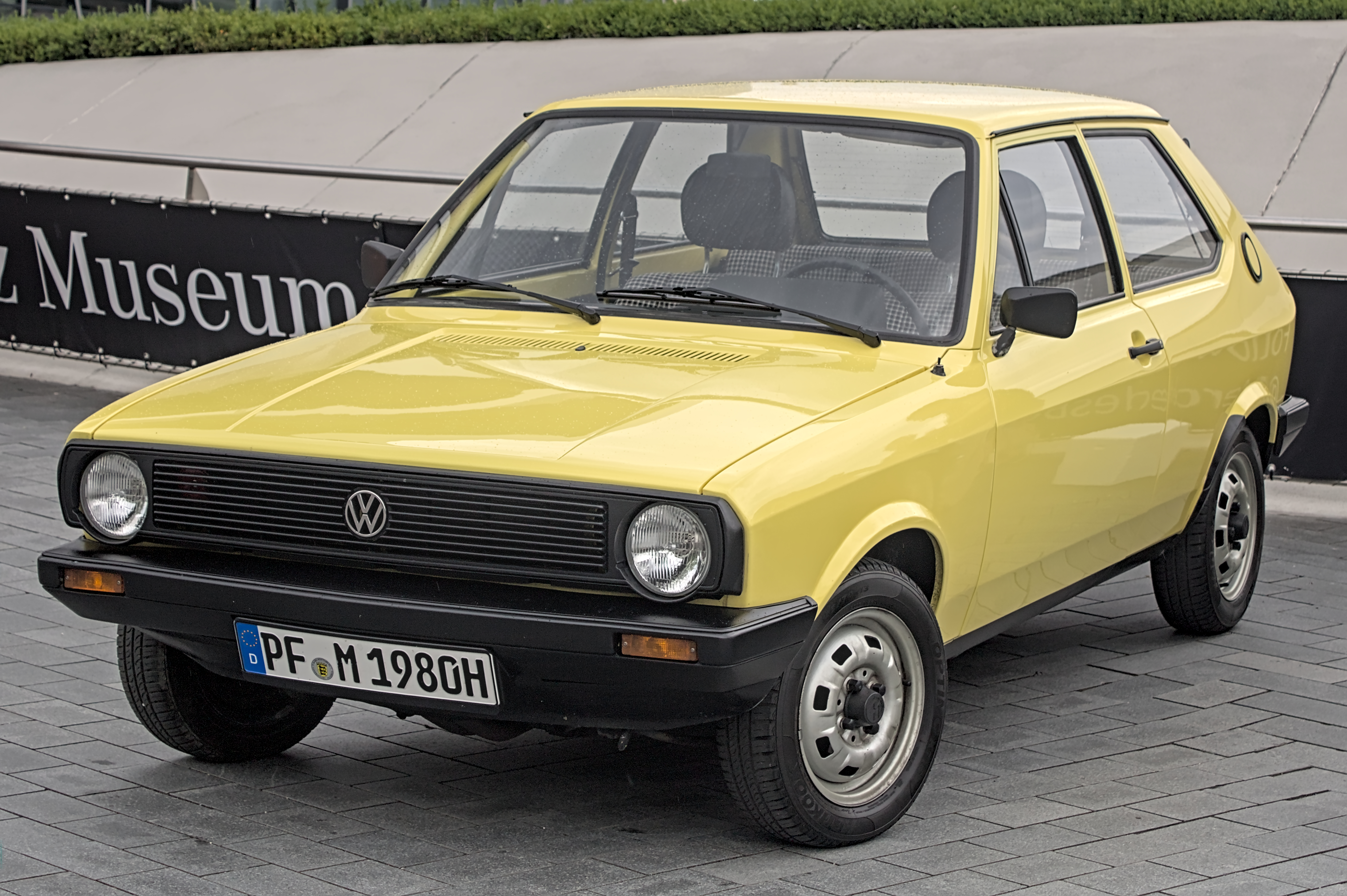

Overview
- Also called: Volkswagen Derby
- Production: 1979–1981

Body and chassis
- Body style: 3-door hatchback 2-door saloon

Chronology
- Successor: Polo Mk2

The Mark 1 Polo and Derby were facelifted in 1979 (unofficially referred to as the Mark 1F) with plastic bumpers, a different front grille and a revised dashboard. They were first shown in February 1979 at the Amsterdam Motor Show. The round headlights of the Derby were replaced with square ones, bringing it inline with the similar Golf-based Jetta saloon.

Further models were added including CLS, S and a run-out LX model. The Mark 1's production run finally ended in October 1981 with over 500,000 Polos sold worldwide.

== See also ==
- Volkswagen Polo for an overview of all models
- Volkswagen Polo Mk2
- Volkswagen Polo Mk3
- Volkswagen Polo Mk4
- Volkswagen Polo Mk5
- Volkswagen Polo Mk6

Preceded by N/A	Volkswagen Polo Mk1; 1975–1981	Succeeded by Volkswagen Polo Mk2
