= NSU Prinz =

Automobile produced in West Germany by the NSU Motorenwerke AG from 1958 to 1973

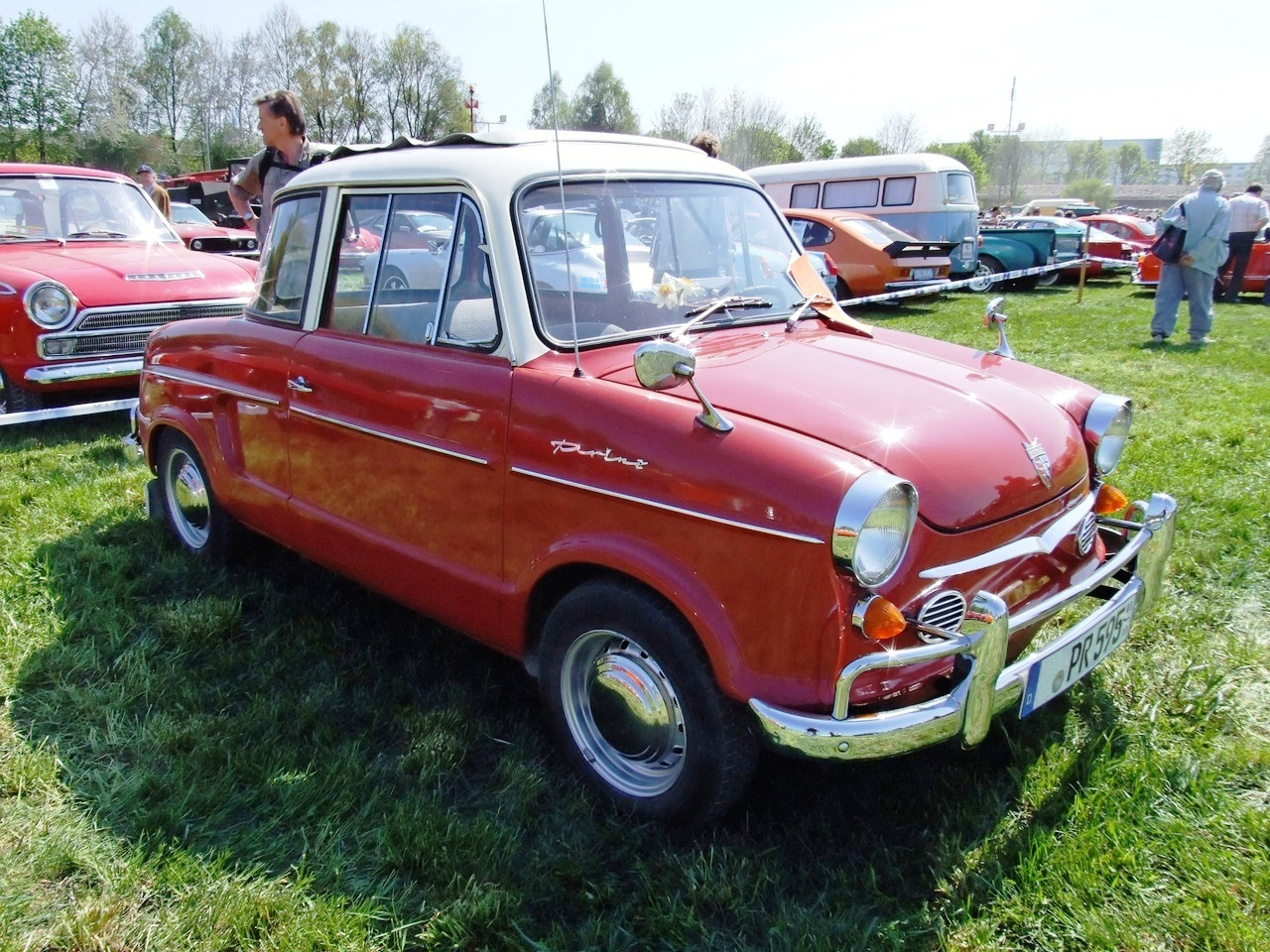
An NSU Prinz in 2007

The NSU Prinz is an automobile which was produced from 1958 to 1973 in West Germany by the NSU Motorenwerke AG which in the mid 1950s had been the biggest motorcycle producer in the world. The production of German motorcycles declined sharply as customers needed weather protection for daily driving, with demand shifting first towards microcars and then towards affordable cars.

== NSU Prinz I, II, and III ==
NSU Prinz I, II, and III
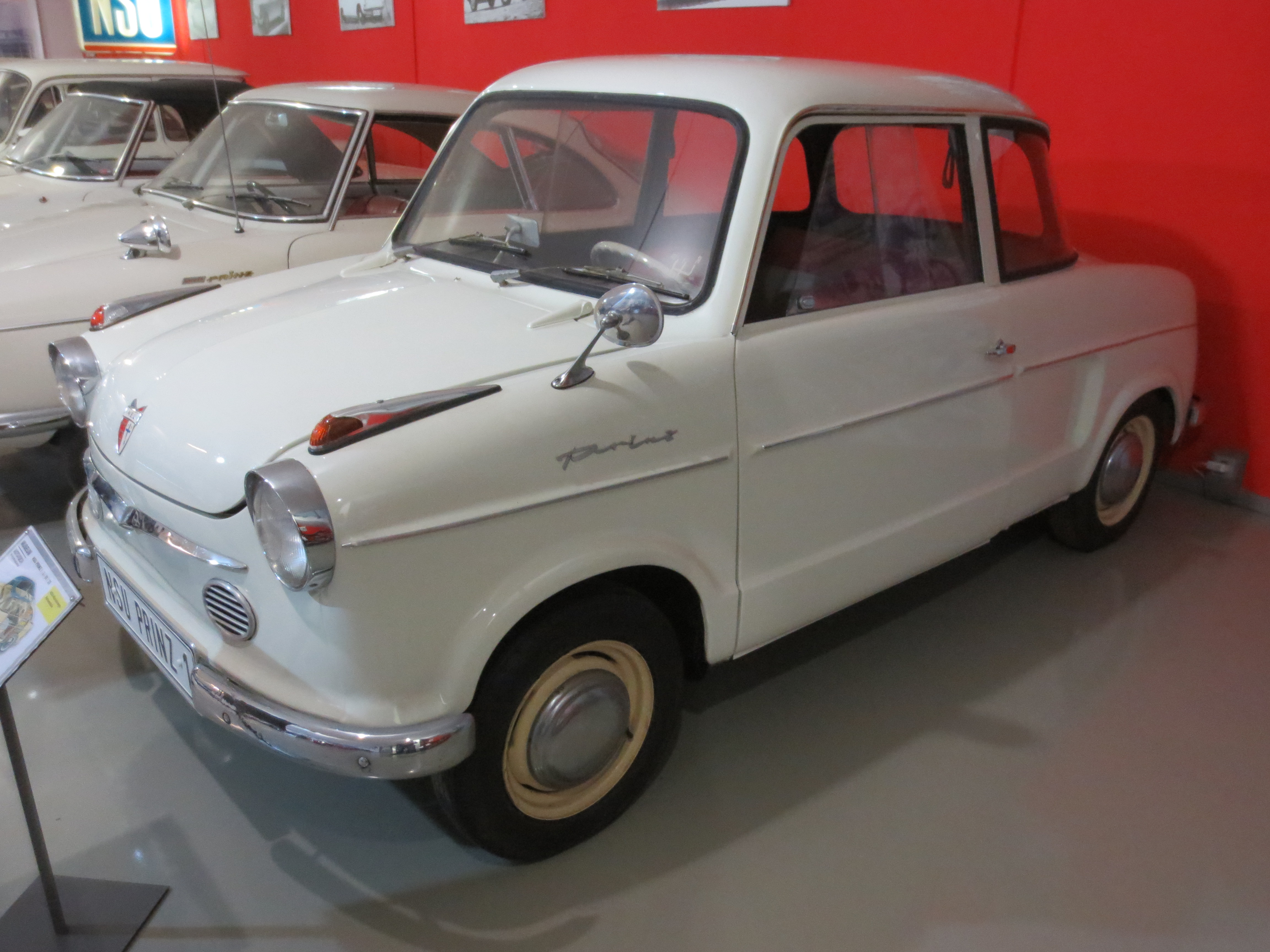
- NSU Prinz I

Overview
- Production: 1958–1962
- Assembly: West Germany: Neckarsulm; Chile: Arica; Australia: Heidelberg, Victoria

Body and chassis
- Body style: 2-door saloon
- Layout: Rear engine, rear-wheel drive
- Related: NSU Spider; Ramses (Utilica)

Powertrain
- Engine: 583 cc (35.6 cu in) I2 rear-mounted air-cooled
- Transmission: 4-speed manual 4-speed manual all-synchromesh

Dimensions
- Wheelbase: 78.7 in (2,000 mm)
- Length: 124 in (3,150 mm)
- Width: 56 in (1,422 mm)
- Height: 53 in (1,346 mm)

NSU's first post-war car, the Prinz I, was launched at the Frankfurt Motor Show in September 1957 with the advertising slogan "Fahre Prinz und Du bist König" ("Drive a Prince and you're a king"). After a pilot run of 150 preproduction cars, volume production began in March 1958.

The Prinz I was available as a two-door saloon featuring an upright roof line and seating for four people. The doors opened wide enough to permit reasonable access even to the rear seats, although leg room was severely restricted if attempting to accommodate four full sized adults. In addition to a luggage compartment accessed via a hatch at the front of the car and shared with the spare wheel and fuel filler, there was a narrow but deep full width space behind the rear seat sufficient to accommodate a holiday suitcase.

The Prinz was exported to the United States, but it did not sell well and was dropped after 1960. The Prinz was used by a US astronaut. While others chose Chevrolet Corvettes that were offered to them by GM, Mercury astronaut John Glenn used the Chevrolet connection to lease a station wagon to haul his kids around in, while using an NSU Prinz 1 as daily driver. The Prinz got better fuel mileage than the Chevrolet, and as Glenn had a longer commute than his fellow astronauts, the more economical Prinz allowed him to save for his children’s college fund.

The noisy two-cylinder 600 cc 20 PS (14.7 kW; 19.7 hp) air-cooled engine was located at the back where it drove the rear wheels, initially via a "crash" gearbox. Later versions gained a four-speed all-synchromesh gearbox. Contemporaries were impressed by the brevity of the maintenance schedule, with the engine, gear box and final drive operating as a single chamber and all lubricated by means of oil, added through a filler in the rocker box cover. There were just two grease nipples requiring attention, positioned on the steering kingpins. The engine was also commended in contemporary reports for its fuel economy and longevity. Although noisy, the engine offered impressive flexibility, recalling NSU's strengths as a motorcycle manufacturer.

The Prinz II was a more 'luxurious' version released in 1959, with better trim and an all-synchromesh gearbox. A 30E export version was equipped with a 30 PS (22.1 kW; 29.6 hp) engine. The Prinz III was launched in October 1960 featuring a new stabilizer bar and the 30 hp motor.

NSU received government approval to build the Prinz in Brazil in the late 1950s, but nothing came of the project.

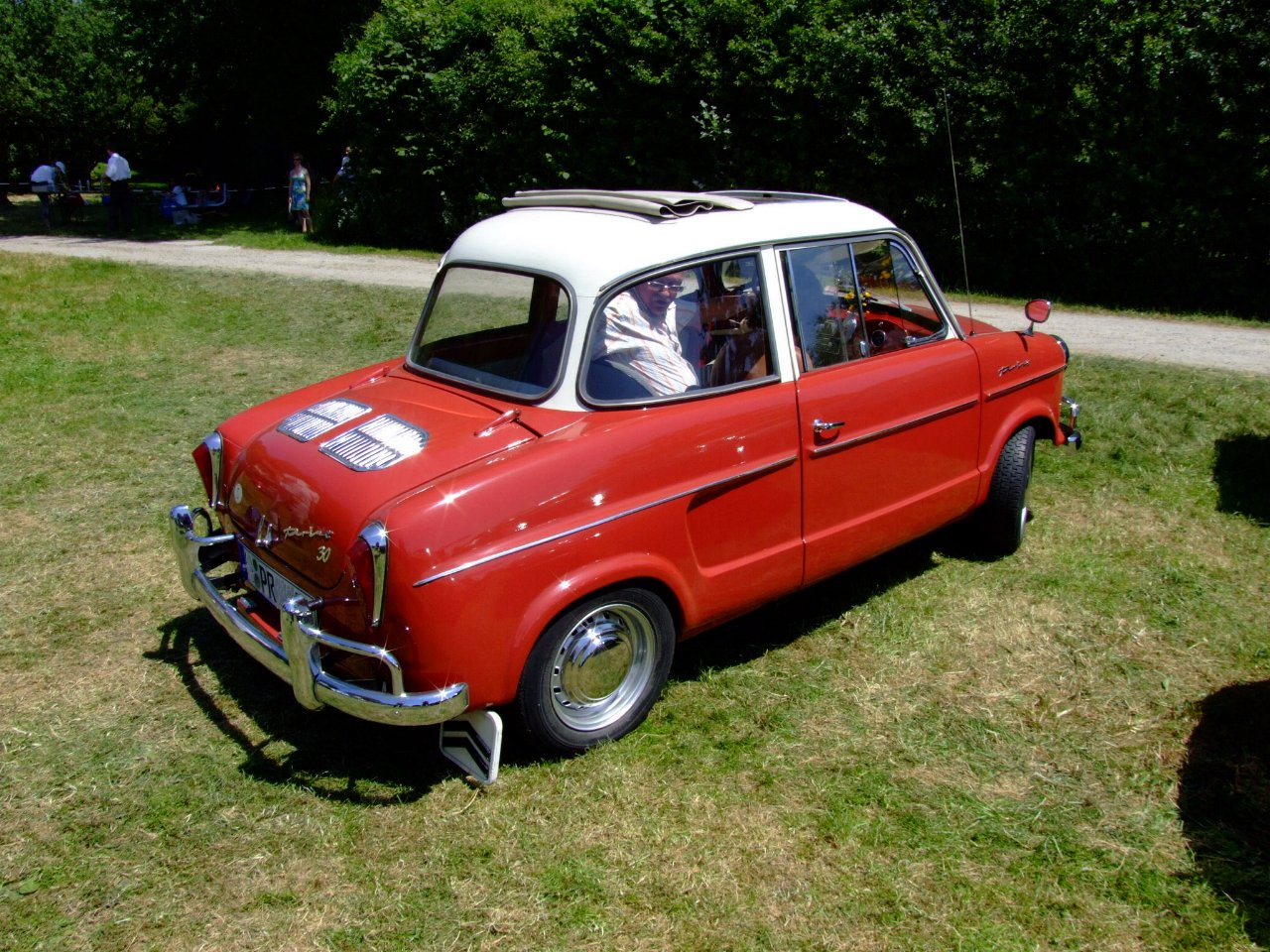
NSU Prinz 30E

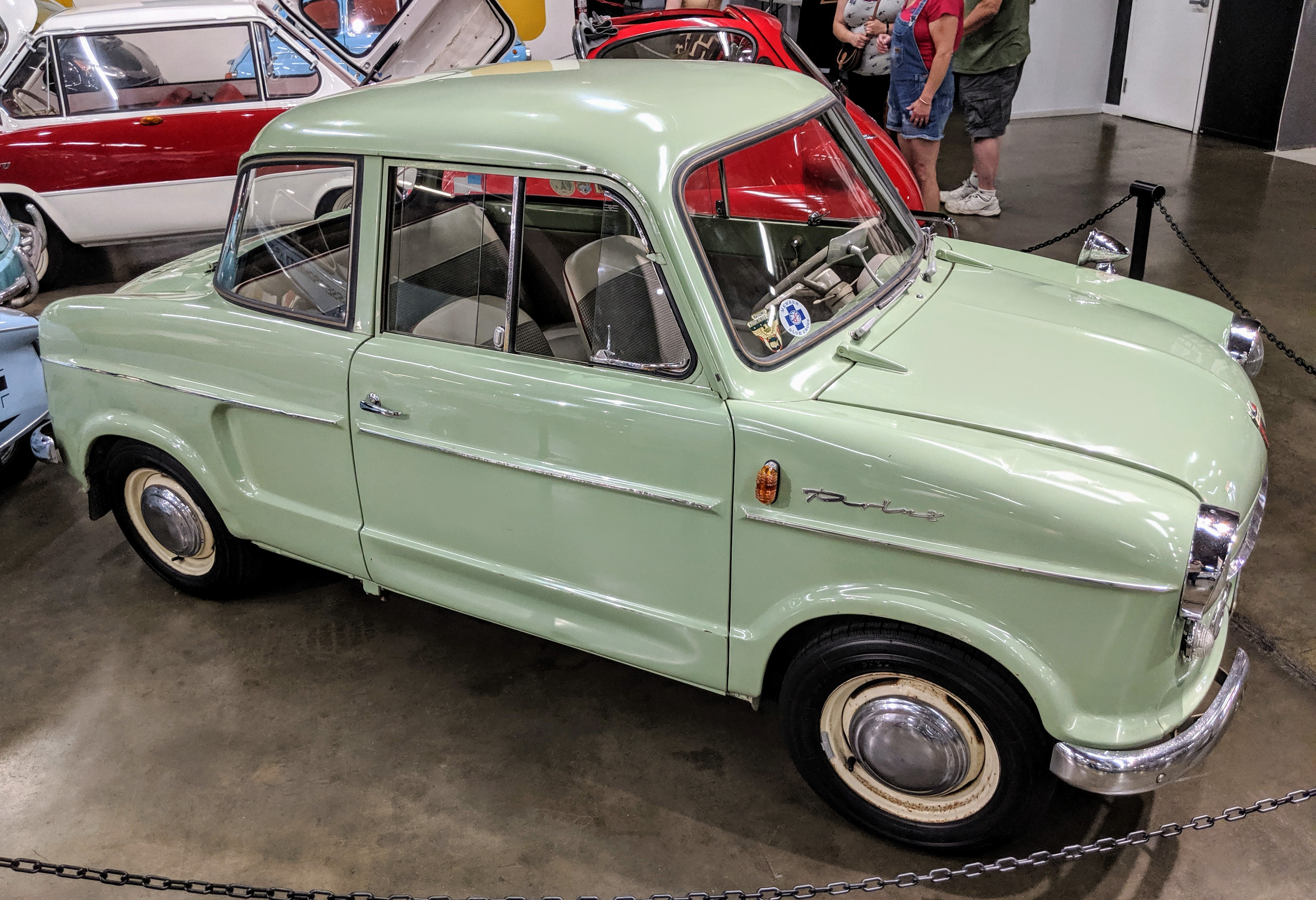
1960 NSU Prinz II

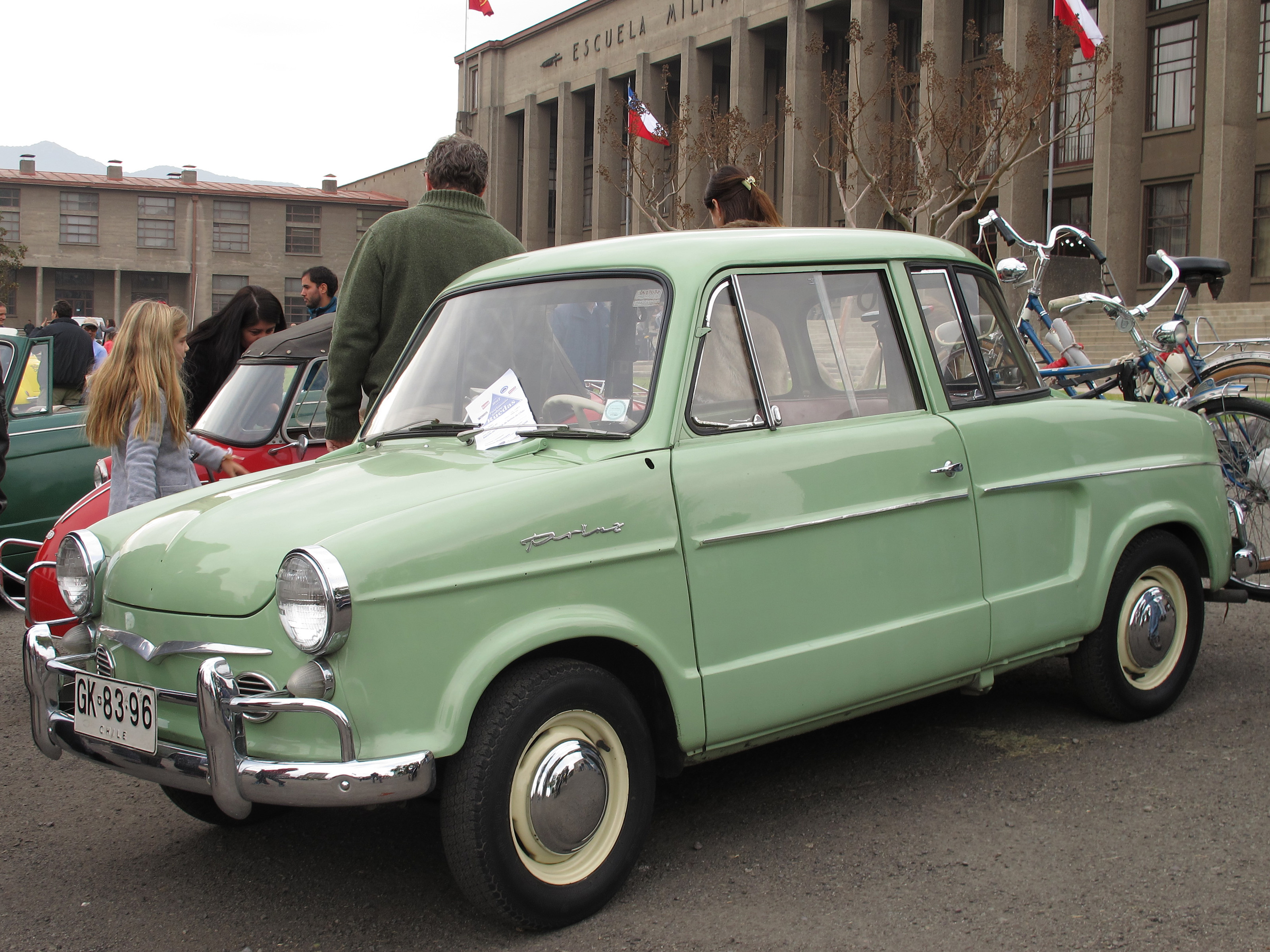
1961 NSU Prinz III

== NSU Sport Prinz ==
NSU Sport Prinz
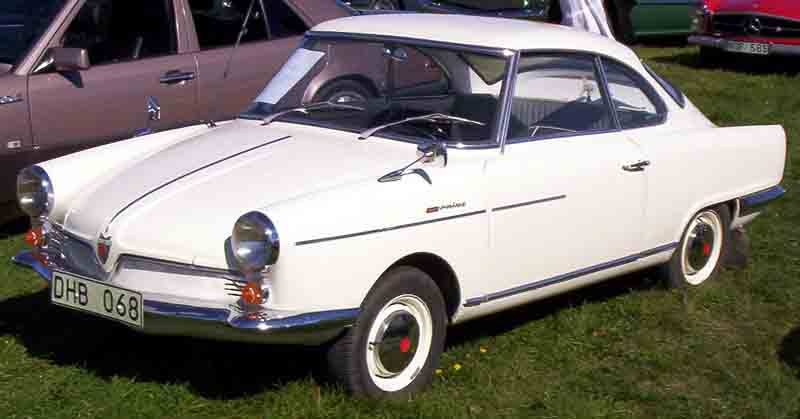
- 1964 NSU Sport Prinz

Overview
- Production: 1958–1968; 20,831 produced
- Assembly: West Germany: Neckarsulm; Italy: Turin (Bertone)

Body and chassis
- Body style: 2-door coupé
- Layout: Rear engine, rear-wheel drive
- Related: NSU Spider

Powertrain
- Engine: 583 cc I2; 598 cc I2

Chronology
- Successor: Audi TT

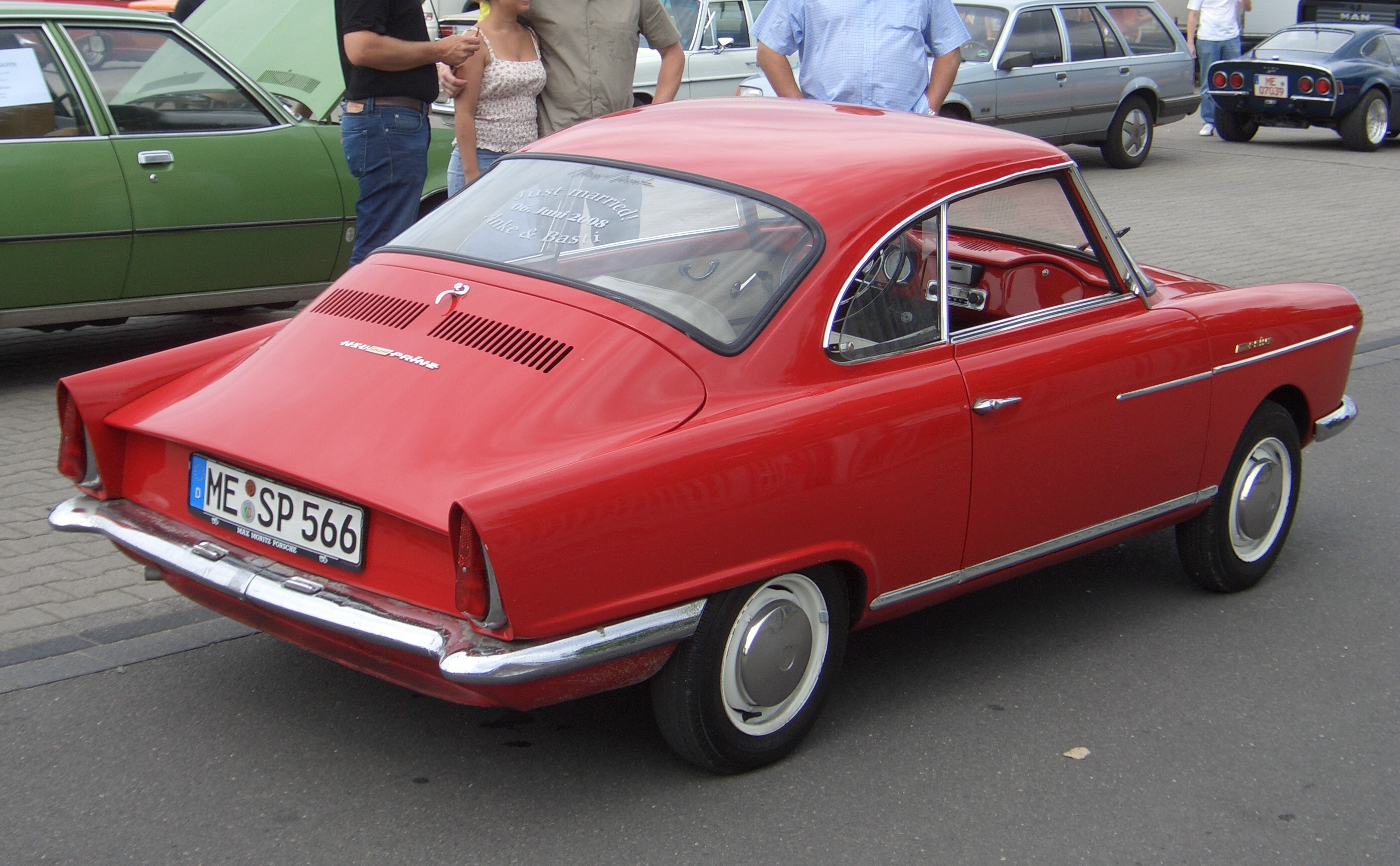
Sport Prinz, rear view

The Sport Prinz was a two-seater sports coupé variant. It was designed by Franco Scaglione at Bertone studios in Turin. 20,831 were manufactured between 1958 and 1968. The first 250 bodies were built by Bertone in Turin. The rest were built in Heilbronn at Karrosseriewerke Drauz, which was later bought by NSU.

The Sport Prinz was initially powered by the 583 cc (35.6 cu in) Prinz 50 straight-twin engine but a maximum speed of 160 km/h (99 mph) was nevertheless claimed. From late 1962 a 598 cc (36.5 cu in) engine was fitted.

The NSU Spider was a Wankel rotary-powered two-seater roadster based on the Sport Prinz platform.

== NSU Prinz 4 ==
NSU Prinz 4

Overview
- Also called: Ramses II (Egypt); NSU P-1000 (Uruguay, 1963–1964)
- Production: 1961–1973

Body and chassis
- Body style: 2-door saloon
- Layout: Rear engine, rear-wheel drive
- Related: NSU P6 (Uruguay, 1963–1967)

Powertrain
- Engine: 598 cc air-cooled OHV I2
- Transmission: 4-speed manual all-synchromesh

Dimensions
- Wheelbase: 2,040 mm (80.3 in)
- Length: 3,440 mm (135 in)
- Width: 1,490 mm (58.7 in)
- Height: 1,360 mm (53.5 in)

Chronology
- Successor: Audi 50

Rear view

One of the revelations of the Frankfurt Motor Show in September 1961, the Prinz 4 replaced the original Prinz. Its new body closely resembled the then fashionable Chevrolet Corvair, but was of course much smaller. Like the original Prinz, it was powered by a two-cylinder air-cooled engine in the rear. The Prinz 4 was much improved and continued to be a well-engineered car, like its predecessors. The engine carried on the NSU tradition of an eccentric rod-driven camshaft inherited from their motorcycle engines, and had a dynastart (combined starter/generator) built into the crankcase. The dynastart also works as a flywheel of the engine. Later, four-cylinder engines adopted the more conventional (pre-engaged) separate starter motor and alternator.

In 1968, Britain's Autocar road tested a Super Prinz. They had tested a Prinz 4 in 1962, and in commenting on how little the car had changed in the intervening six years quipped some of their road testers appeared to have gained more weight than the commendably light-weight Prinz in that period. The test car achieved a top speed of 70 mph (113 km/h) and accelerated to 60 mph (97 km/h) in 35.7 seconds. The home grown Mini 850 reached 60 mph in 29.5 seconds in an equivalent contemporary test and also managed to beat the NSU's top speed, albeit only by about 3%. At this time, the UK car market was heavily protected by tariffs, and the Prinz's UK manufacturer's recommended retail price was £597, which was more than the (possibly below cost) £561 asked for the 850 cc Mini, but certainly not completely out of touch with it. The testers concluded their report that the car was competitively priced in its class and performed adequately. They opined, cautiously, it offered 'no more than the rest' but neither did it 'lack anything important'.

== NSU Prinz 1000, TT ==
NSU Prinz 1000/1000 C/TT/TTS
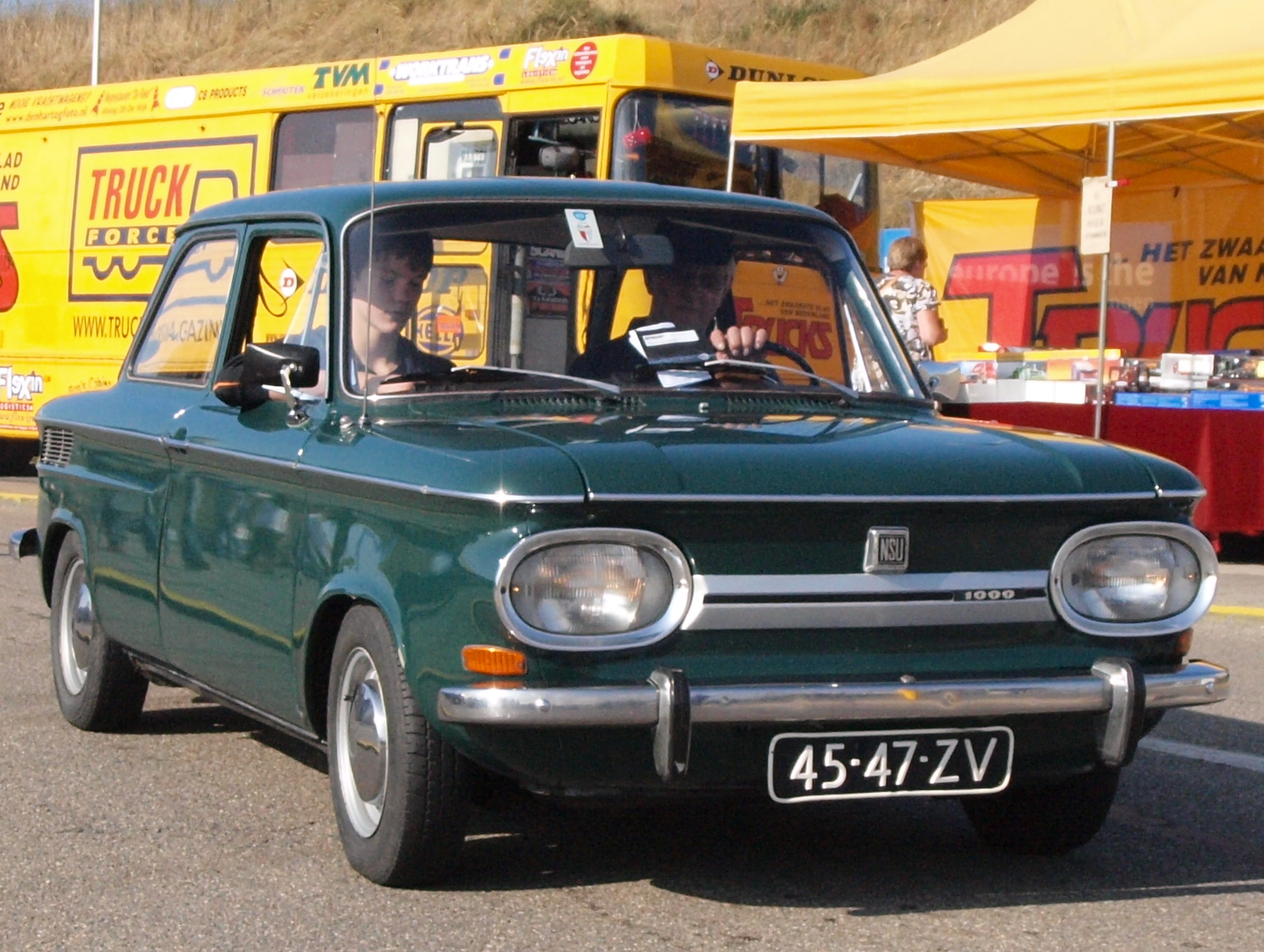
- NSU 1000 C

Overview
- Production: 1963–1972

Body and chassis
- Body style: 2-door saloon
- Layout: Rear engine, rear-wheel drive
- Related: NSU P10 (Uruguay, 1970–1971)

Powertrain
- Engine: 996 cc air-cooled OHC I4; 1085 cc air-cooled OHC I4; 1177 cc air-cooled OHC I4
- Transmission: 4-speed manual all-synchromesh

Dimensions
- Wheelbase: 2,250 mm (88.6 in)
- Length: 3,760 mm (148.0 in) (1000 C); 3,793 mm (149.3 in) (TT/TTS)
- Width: 1,490 mm (58.7 in)
- Height: 1,364 mm (53.7 in)

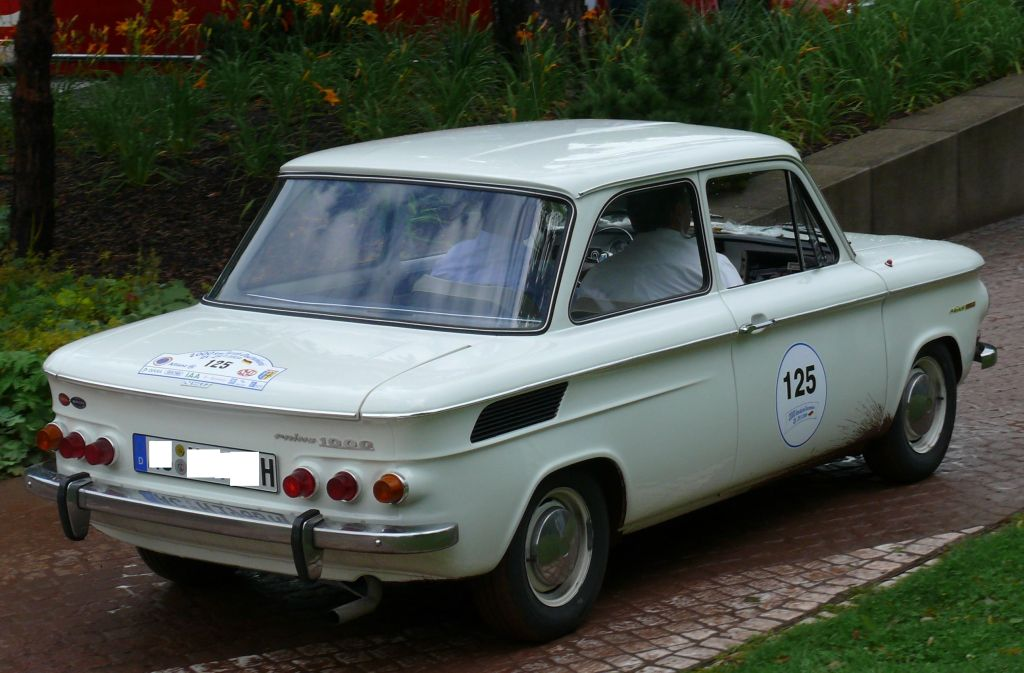
NSU Prinz 1000

The NSU Prinz evolved into the somewhat larger bodied NSU Prinz 1000 (Typ 67a), introduced at the 1963 Frankfurt Motor Show. A sporting NSU 1000 TT (with a 1.1 litre engine) also appeared, which was later developed into the NSU (1200) TT and NSU TTS models. All had the same body with inline-four air-cooled OHC engines and were frequently driven as sports cars, but also as economical family cars as well. The mostly alloy engines were very lively, and highly reliable. The OHC arrangement was quite advanced for the time on a small family car as most home-grown cars were still using less efficient pushrod engines. The Prinz 1000 lost the "Prinz" part of the name in January 1967, becoming simply the NSU 1000 or 1000 C depending on the equipment. It has 40 PS (29 kW) DIN, while the 1200 TT has 65 PS DIN (48 kW) and the most potent TTS version has 70 PS DIN (51 kW) from only one litre. The 1000 received large oval headlights, while the sportier TT versions have twin round headlights mounted within the same frame. The first 1000 TT has 55 PS (40 kW) DIN and uses the engine first introduced in the larger NSU Typ 110.

The NSU Prinz 1000 TT was built in 14,292 examples between 1965 and 1967, when it was replaced by the bigger engined TT. This, with a 1.2-liter engine, was built until July 1972 for a total of 49,327 examples. The TT can be recognized by its broad black stripe between its headlights. The TTS was built especially for competition, being successful in both hillclimbs and circuit racing. It has a front-mounted oil cooler and was built in 2,402 examples from February 1967 until July 1971. It was briefly referred to as the "Prinz 1000 TTS" when first introduced. There was also a competition model of the TTS available for sale, with 83 PS DIN (61 kW). Production of the Typ 67a (NSU 1000) came to a halt in December 1972.

In 1965, an even larger model was added, initially called Typ 110, and from 1967 on NSU 1200. It offered more space, so it was a better family car, but was not as sporty as the smaller models. Therefore, the NSU 1200TT used the 1200 cc engine of the 1200 in the smaller body of the NSU 1000.

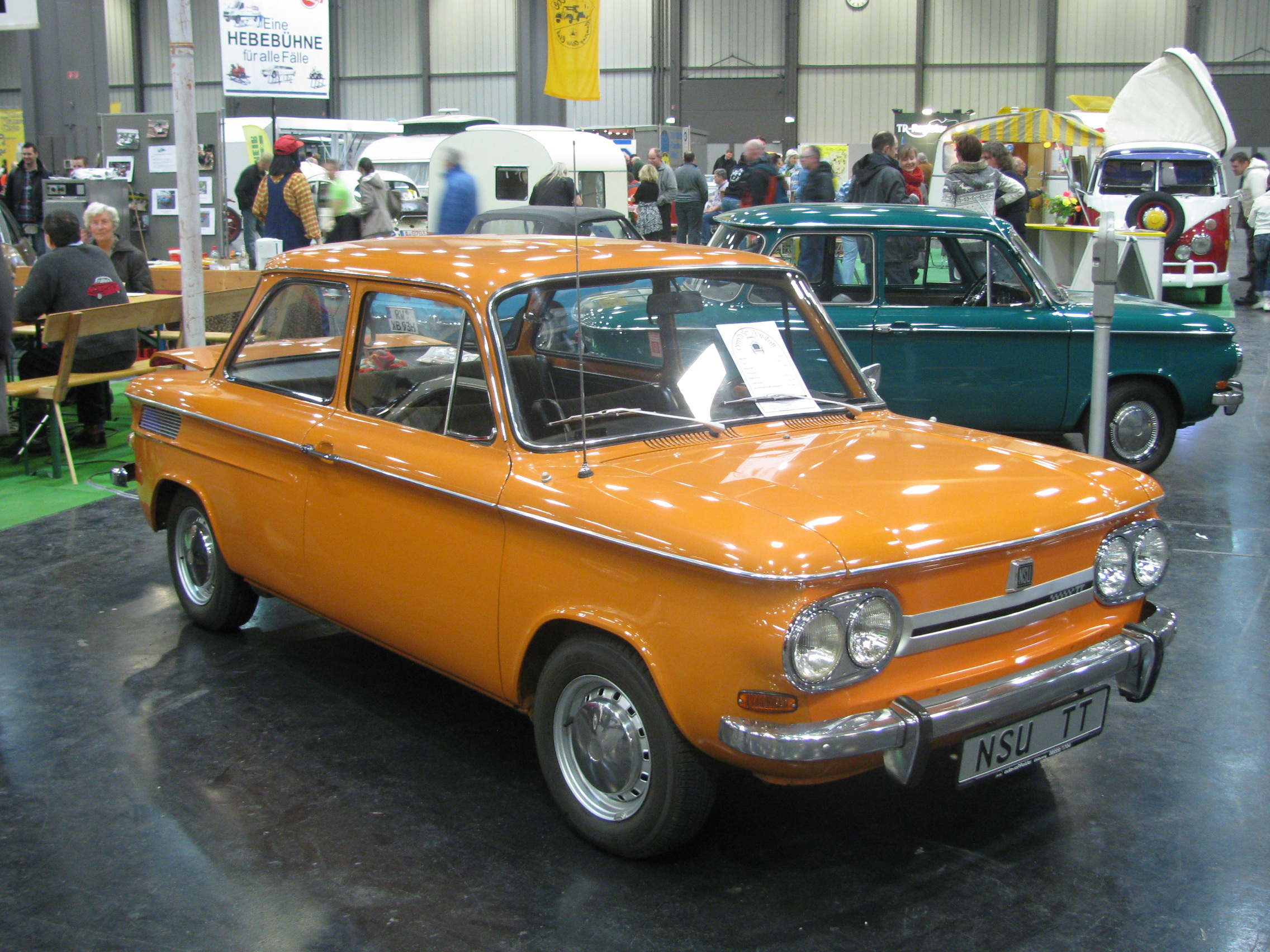
1969 NSU TT

=== End of production ===
NSU was acquired by Volkswagen in 1969 due to financial difficulties at NSU and merged with Auto Union AG. Auto Union had been taken over by VW in 1964 and was producing mid-sized cars under the revived Audi marque. The name of the new company was Audi NSU Auto Union AG. The small, rear-engined NSUs were phased out in 1973, as production capacity was needed for larger and more profitable Audis. Audi's contender in the Prinz' market segment was the front-wheel drive Audi 50, later rebadged as the Volkswagen Polo.

== Related models ==
The Prinz was manufactured under license in Sarajevo, Yugoslavia (now in Bosnia-Herzegovina), by PRETIS (Preduzeće Tito Sarajevo). Around 15,000 vehicles were made.

The Prinz was also manufactured in Argentina by Autoar, making mainly models Prinz II and Prinz III / 30. A total of 2,432 units were built between 1959 and 1963. It is said that only 40-45 Sportprinz and fewer than ten Prinz IV were imported.

The Ramses was the first car produced in Egypt, and was the result of a co-operation between the new Egyptian car firm Egyptian Light Transport Manufacturing Company, and NSU. The factory was located right next to the Great Pyramids. Plans were to produce around 10,000 cars a year, most of the work being manual labor.

The 1.2-liter Prinz four-cylinder air-cooled engine was also famously adopted by Friedl Münch in 1966 for the hand-built Münch Mammut motorcycle, at the time the fastest and most expensive motorcycle in production.

In Uruguay, the Prinz 4 was built by Nordex S.A., and a new model, the P6, combined the engine and mechanics of the NSU model with a separate body completely redesigned by Carlos Sotomayor. From 1970, the P10 was built as the successor model to the NSU P6. This had the larger engine of the NSU Prince 1000 and a 21 cm extended wheelbase.

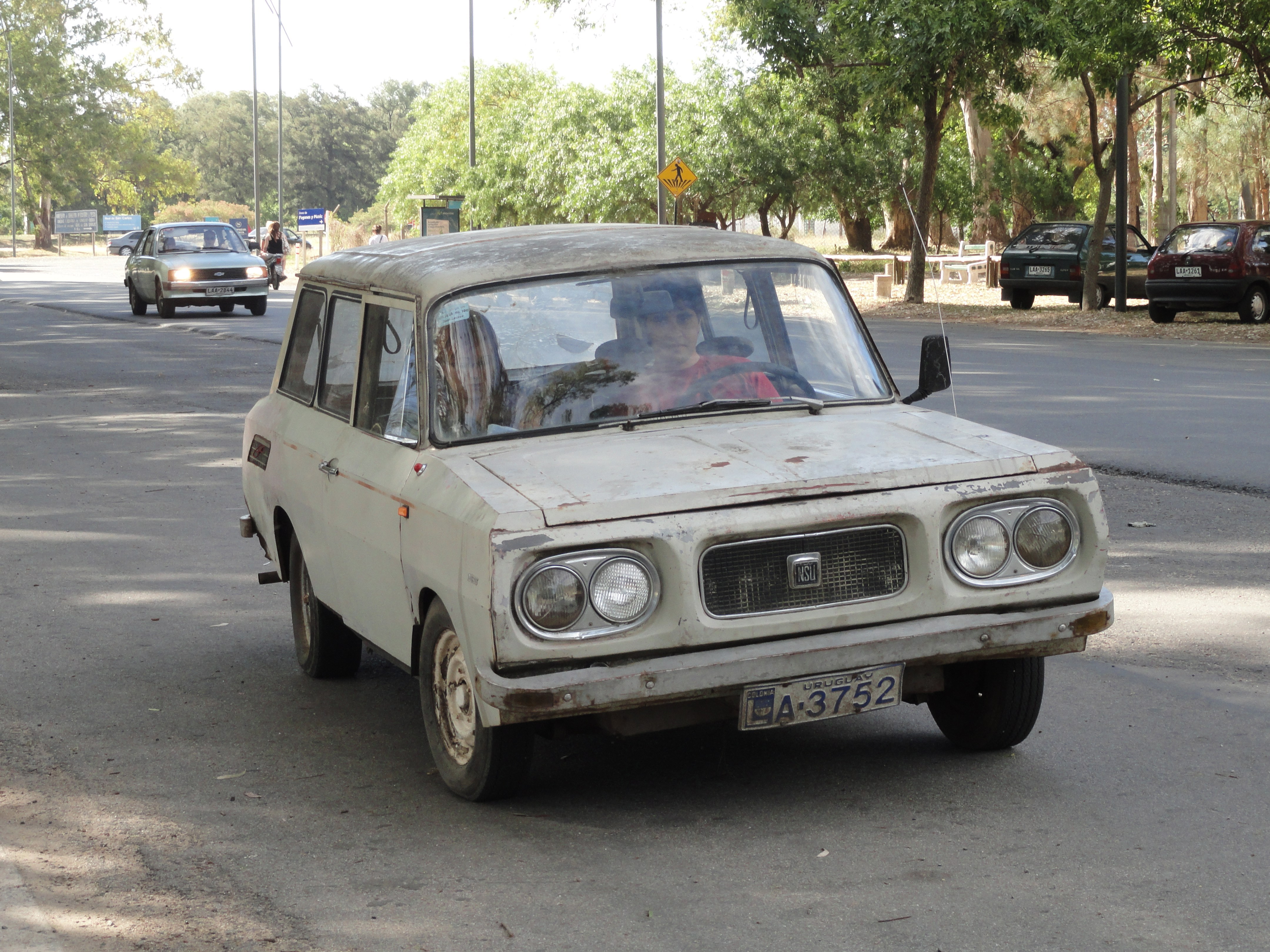
1970 NSU P10, produced by Nordex in Uruguay.
