= NSU Typ 110 =

NSU Typ 110 (1965–1967) NSU 1200 (1967–1972)
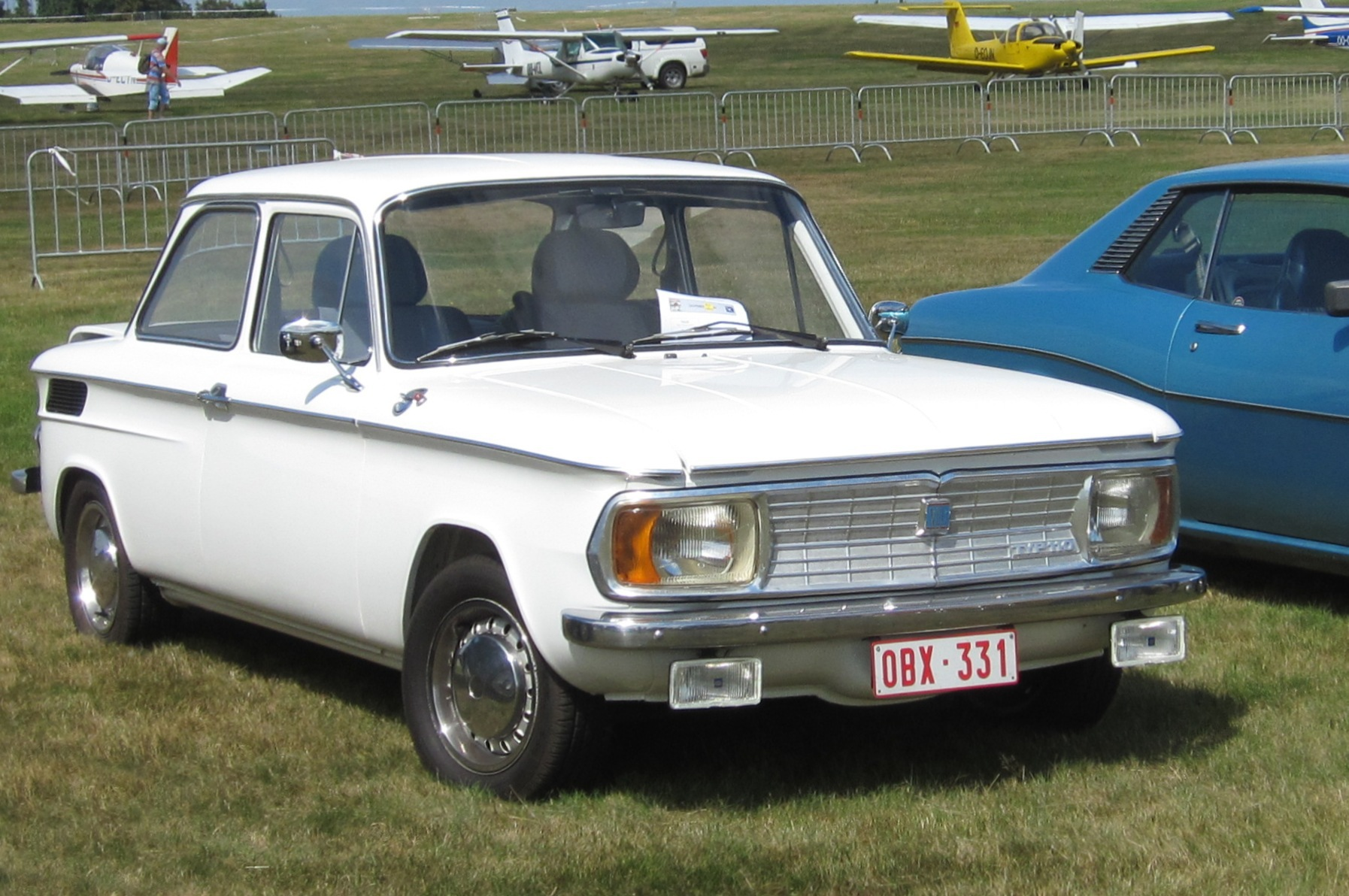
- NSU Typ 110

Overview
- Manufacturer: NSU Motorenwerke AG
- Production: 1965–1972
- Assembly: West Germany: Neckarsulm

Body and chassis
- Body style: 2-door sedan
- Layout: RR layout

Powertrain
- Engine: 1,085 cc (66.2 cu in) air-cooled four-cylinder (1965–1967); 1,177 cc (71.8 cu in) air-cooled four-cylinder (1967–1972)
- Transmission: 4-speed manual all-synchromesh with hydraulically operated single plate dry clutch

Dimensions
- Wheelbase: 2,440 mm (96 in)
- Length: 4,000 mm (160 in)
- Width: 1,490 mm (59 in)
- Height: 1,390 mm (55 in)

Chronology
- Predecessor: DKW F12
- Successor: Audi 50

The NSU Typ 110 is a small car that was made by NSU between 1965 and 1972 (branded as the NSU 1200 after 1967). It was first presented at the 1965 Frankfurt Motor Show, widening NSU's range in the process. It was based on the NSU Prinz 1000 but with a longer wheelbase and a front overhang, which increased available space both in the passenger cabin and in the luggage compartment. With an external length of four metres the car took NSU into the lower rungs of the middle class saloon sector, as it existed at that time in West Germany. It was to distance the model from the small car sector that for this model NSU abandoned the Prinz name which had till then been carried by their passenger cars.

== Design ==
Viewed from the front, large rectangular headlights differentiate the Typ 110 from the smaller models, flanking a large chrome-effect panel that might have passed for a false grille. Inside, domestic market cars featured a fashionable strip speedometer reminiscent of that found on the Opel Rekord B which had been introduced a couple of months earlier. The Typ 110 came with a strip of 'simulated wood' veneer across the width of the dash board, while a new heating and ventilation system testified to the car's middle class aspirations. Reclining front seats were available at extra cost.

The Typ 110 and the Prinz 1000 were powered by rear-mounted air-cooled four-cylinder engines. These were noted for their relatively advanced configuration for the times, being mounted transversely and having a chain-driven single overhead camshaft with an inline-mounted distributor. Initially the Typ 110 came with a 1085 cc engine with a claimed output of 49 PS (36 kW), which would also find its way into the sporting smaller Prinz 1000 TT, albeit with a slightly higher claimed output of 40 kW (54 PS; 54 hp). In the autumn of 1966 a larger engine of 1177 cc 60 PS (44 kW) became available in a version designated as the NSU Typ 110 S or 110 SC.

The independent rear suspension design was of semi-trailing arm configuration and, similarly to most of the body and floor pan structure aft of the A-Pillar, was shared between the 1000 and Type 110. However, the front suspension of the Typ 110 was a new double-wishbone design with longer wishbones, better noise isolation and longer wheel travel than those of the 1000 models.

== Renaming ==
Later in 1967, NSU simplified their model range. The NSU Typ 110 was rebranded as the NSU 1200, with claimed engine output now reduced back to 40 kW (54 PS; 54 hp). In this form it continued to be offered in Germany until December 1972. A "C" ('comfort') version had a 'generous range of special equipment'.

In January 1966, Britain's Autocar magazine tested a 1085 cc NSU Typ 110. In July 1967, the larger-engined 1177 cc Typ 110SC having become available in right hand drive form on the UK market, they tested the newer model and compared results from the two tests. The top speed achieved had increased from 87 mph (140 km/h) to 93 mph (150 km/h). The acceleration time from 0 to 50 mph (80 km/h) had come down from 12.3 seconds to precisely 10.0 seconds. There was also a 10% improvement in overall fuel consumption for the test from 26.9 mpg_{‑imp} (10.5 L/100 km; 22.4 mpg_{‑US}) to 29.7 mpg_{‑imp} (9.5 L/100 km; 24.7 mpg_{‑US}). Other sources indicate even better performance for the Typ 110 SC, but by any reckoning it is apparent that the car's relative lightness of build and its energetic engine tended to place it at or near the top of performance tables for smaller saloons, albeit at a time when the German market best seller was still the relatively heavy Volkswagen Beetle offered, at this stage, only with 1200 or 1300 cc engines. Disc brakes at the front ensured reasonable stopping power. Less in the NSU's favour was its poor directional stability in cross winds, a particular issue for Autobahn cruising. German reports nevertheless commended the car's ease of handling in city traffic and on mountain roads where the positioning of the engine above the driving wheels, at the rear of the vehicle, conferred a traction advantage in winter conditions.

In 1967 the British car market still sheltered behind significant import tariffs: in the UK the Typ 110 SC carried a manufacturer's recommended retail price of £799 at a time when the similarly angular (if 4 inches (10 cm) shorter) Triumph Herald 12/50 was retailing on its own home market for £678.

The Typ 110 was also unusually easy to repair, with care taken to ensure easy replacement of key components: it was claimed that the entire clutch could be changed in just 30 minutes. Zinc coating on the underbody promised superior rust resistance. Recommended service intervals of 7,500 kilometres (4,700 mi) at a time when competitor vehicles typically required a routine service every 5,000 kilometres (3,100 mi) also gave the car an advantage in a cost conscious market place, and pointed to a future when less than a decade later NSU's new parent company, Volkswagen would lead the way in extending recommended service intervals to 15,000 kilometres (9,300 mi) with their new front engined ranges.

Between 1965 and 1967 approximately 74,000 NSU Typ 110/110SCs were built. After the car was rebranded, approximately 256,000 NSU 1200s were built between 1967 and 1972.

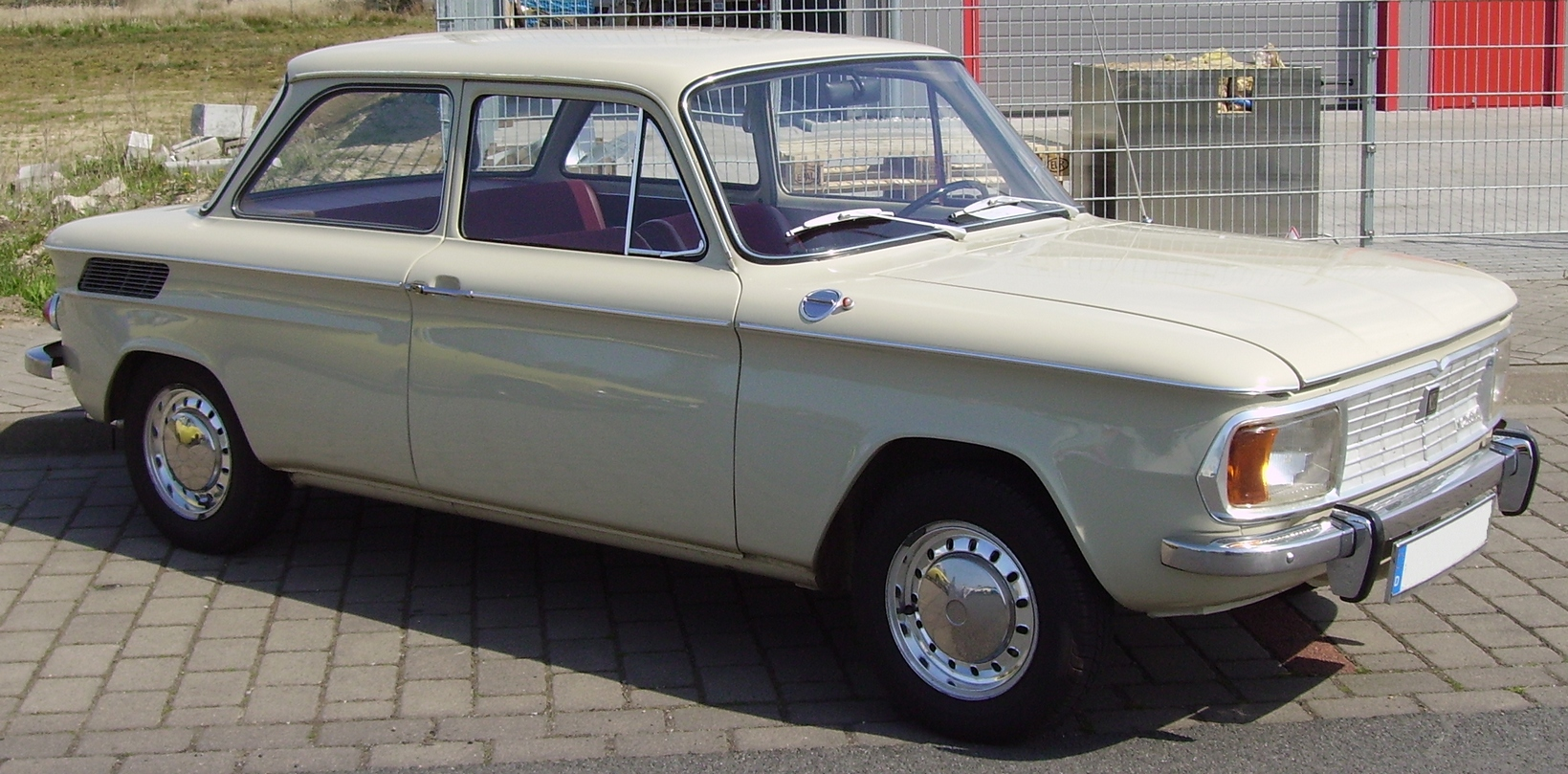
NSU 1200
