= NSU Spider =

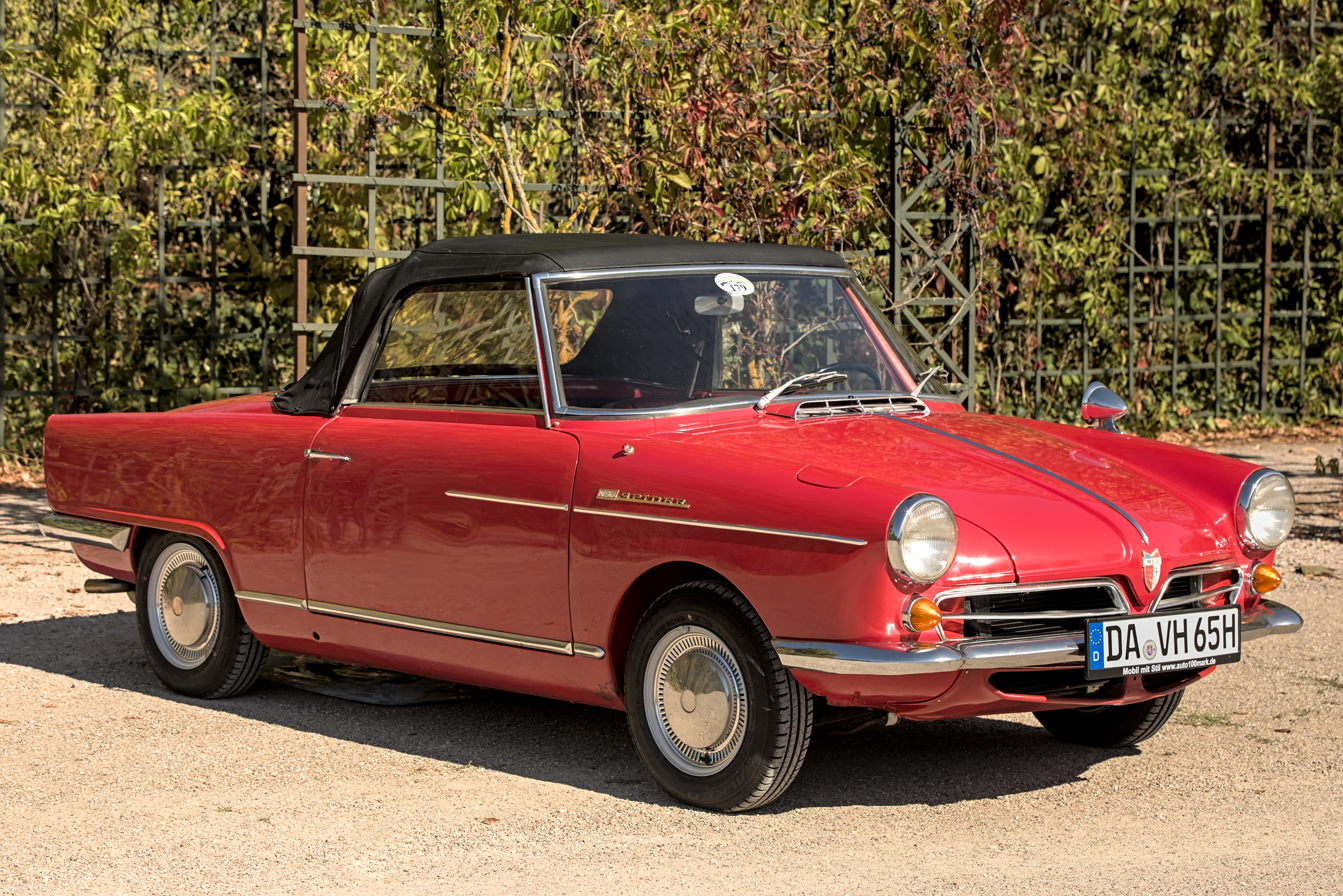

Overview
- Manufacturer: NSU Motorenwerke AG
- Production: 1963–1967; 2,375 built
- Assembly: West Germany: Neckarsulm
- Designer: Bertone

Body and chassis
- Body style: 2-door cabriolet
- Layout: RR layout
- Related: NSU Sportprinz

Powertrain
- Engine: 996 cc KKM 502 (Wankel)
- Transmission: 4-speed all-synchromesh manual

Dimensions
- Wheelbase: 2,020 mm (79.5 in)
- Length: 3,580 mm (140.9 in)
- Width: 1,520 mm (59.8 in)
- Height: 1,260 mm (49.6 in)
- Curb weight: 700 kg (1,500 lb) (Measurements approximate)

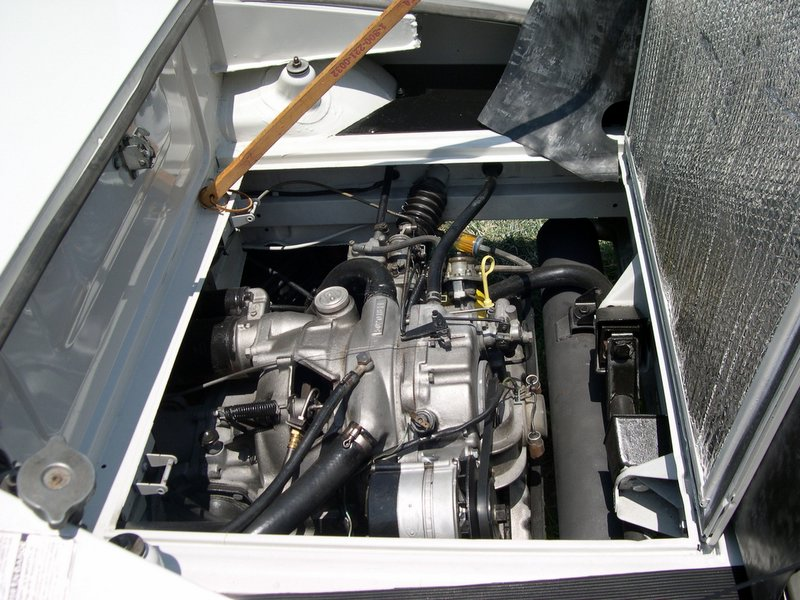
The engine bay had originally been designed to take the four-stroke air-cooled two-cylinder engine from the NSU Prinz. The rotary unit was much more compact permitting a shallow luggage locker fitted above it. This compensated for a reduction in luggage space at the front of the car because of the front mounting of the cooling radiator.

The NSU Spider is an automobile which was produced by NSU Motorenwerke AG from 1963 to 1967.

The Spider was the first Western production car in the world to be powered by a Wankel rotary engine. The water-cooled, single-rotor engine and standard front disc brakes differentiated the car from other cars of similar type of the period. The body was designed by Bertone.

== Body ==
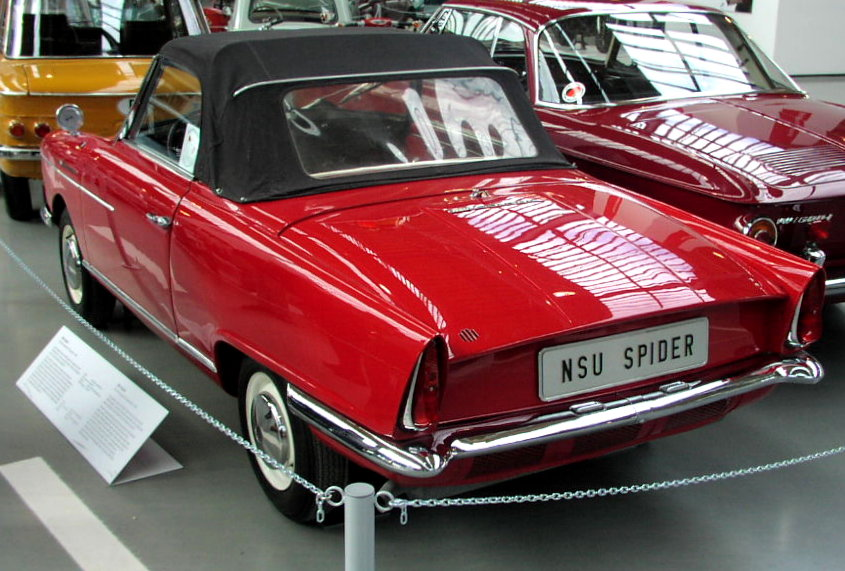
NSU Spider (rear view)

First appearing in 1963, the Spider featured a two-door cabriolet body based on that of the NSU Sport Prinz coupé introduced in 1959. In addition to the folding roof, the Spider was distinguishable from the hard top version by having a grille at the front. As with all NSU cars at the time, the engine was rear-mounted: in order to improve weight distribution, space was found for the Spider's radiator and for its 35-litre (9 US gal; 8 imp gal) fuel tank ahead of the driver. The front luggage locker was, in consequence, small. There was a second luggage area in the rear of the car above the engine.

== Rotary engine ==
The NSU Spider is the first series production car powered by a Wankel rotary engine. In the Spider, a KKM 502 single-rotor engine with a single spark plug was used; it has a chamber volume of 498 cc (30 cu in), and displaces 996 cc (61 cu in) from a generating radius of 100 mm, a width of 67 mm, an eccentricity of 14 mm and an equidistant of 2 mm. Compression is 8.5, and the fuel required is petrol with an octane rating of 91 RON. The Spider's engine had "teething troubles", but is a compact, smoothly running engine with a decent power output. Rated power is 54 PS (40 kW) at 6,000 rpm. Maximum torque output is 79 N⋅m (58 lb⋅ft) at 3,500 rpm, equivalent to a BMEP of 1 MPa (145 lbf/in^{2}). It was later found that the characteristics of critical materials selected and applied by NSU to build production rotary engines were inappropriate to the stresses they would bear, and rotary-engined cars earned a reputation for unreliability. Engines required frequent rebuilding to replace worn apex seals, and warranty costs associated with installation of the engine in NSU’s second Wankel-engined model destroyed the financial viability of NSU, forcing a merger with Audi in 1969. The rotary engine was installed above the rear axle, being compact, light and free revving in comparison with conventional piston engines of the time. By ignoring the manufacturer's recommendations it was possible to rev the engine briefly above 7,000 rpm in the lower gears and thereby to achieve a 0–100 km/h (62 mph) time of 14.5 seconds: other sources, presumably based on following the manufacturer's recommendations, give a time of 15.7 seconds.

== Commercial ==
Large sales volumes were never envisaged for the car, and this was reflected in a relatively high retail price, USD$2,979. Between 1964 and 1967 2,375 were built. In 1967, the model was withdrawn and NSU's second rotary-engined production saloon was presented. The Ro 80, totaled 37,398 units during its ten year production run.

In 1966, Al Auger of Richmond, California, became the first person to race a Wankel-powered production car in an officially sanctioned race. After only installing a mandatory roll-bar and racing tires on an NSU Spider, Auger raced in 1966 and 1967 in Sports Car Club of America sanctioned road races throughout California finishing second overall in the championship both years in Class H Modified. Because SCCA had no technical information about the Wankel engine it was placed in H Modified racing against lighter, more powerful, 850 cc highly modified pure racing cars.
