= Audi 50 =

Audi 50 (86)
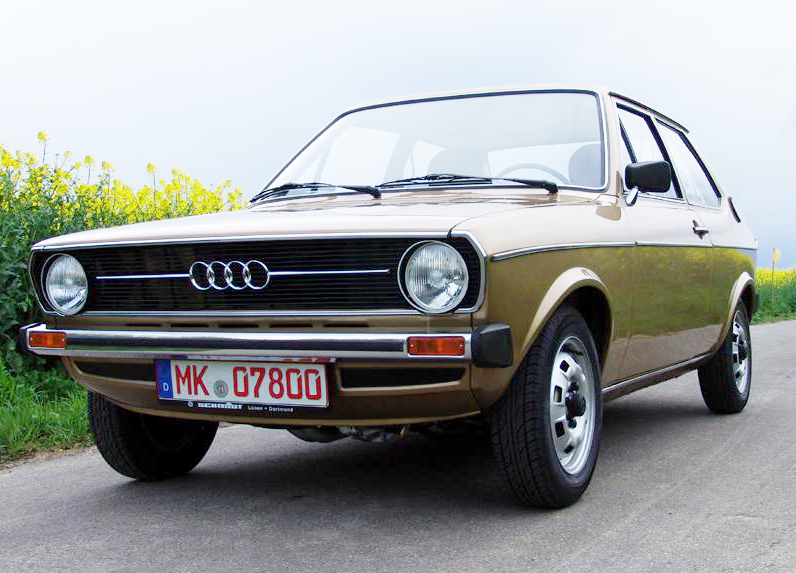
- 09/1974 Audi 50 GL gold-metallic press-car

Overview
- Manufacturer: Audi NSU Auto Union AG
- Production: 1974–1978; 180,812 built
- Assembly: Germany: Neckarsulm
- Designer: Marcello Gandini at Bertone; Claus Luthe (final design)

Body and chassis
- Class: Supermini (B)
- Body style: 3-door hatchback
- Layout: transverse front engine, front-wheel drive
- Platform: Volkswagen Group A01
- Related: Volkswagen Polo Mk1

Powertrain
- Engine: 1.1 L OHC I4; 1.3 L OHC I4
- Transmission: 4-speed manual

Dimensions
- Wheelbase: 2,335 mm (91.9 in)
- Length: 3,510 mm (138.2 in)
- Width: 1,560 mm (61.4 in)
- Height: 1,340 mm (52.8 in)

Chronology
- Predecessor: NSU Prinz; NSU 1200
- Successor: Audi A1; Audi A2

The Audi 50 (known internally as Typ 86) is a small supermini car produced by German automaker Audi from 1974 to 1978, and sold only in Europe. Introduced two and three years after the French Renault 5 and the Italian Fiat 127 respectively, the Audi 50 and its VW Polo twin were seen at the time as Germany's first home-grown entrant in Europe's emerging class of "supermini" hatchbacks, supplanting a generation of small and often rear-engined economy cars.

== History ==
=== Development and design ===
Audi had noticed the fast growth in popularity of small, front-wheel drive cars with a large, upward swinging rear hatch, top-hinged at the rear edge of the roof, and a maximised rear space that could be flexibly used. In the 1960s, hatchbacks were still an innovative vehicle concept, and Audi began thinking of such a car in 1968. When NSU folded into the Volkswagen group, and was initially merged into "Audi NSU Auto Union AG", plans became firmer.

Audi NSU's design and development center in Ingolstadt was opened, and project K50 (Kolben (Note: Kolben meaning "piston" in German) 50), was started, initially intended to replace NSU's line-up of small, rear-engined sedans. Project K50 was developed in a very short time of just 21 months.

Supervised by Audi boss and chief-engineer Ludwig Kraus, the Audi/NSU 50 was designed by Bertone's chief designer Marcello Gandini, while Audi's own Claus Luthe finalised the design of the car's modern, stylish unitary bodywork.

Within the Volkswagen Audi NSU group, it was initially preferred to market the K50 as an Audi, because the NSU brand, with their daring, aerodynamic, rotary engine powered NSU Ro80 saloon, was viewed too extravagant to fit well in Volkswagen's house – plus: since 1965, Audi had made an impressive come-back under Ludwig Kraus' lead, with fresh cars, in tune with the late sixties European automobile Zeitgeist.

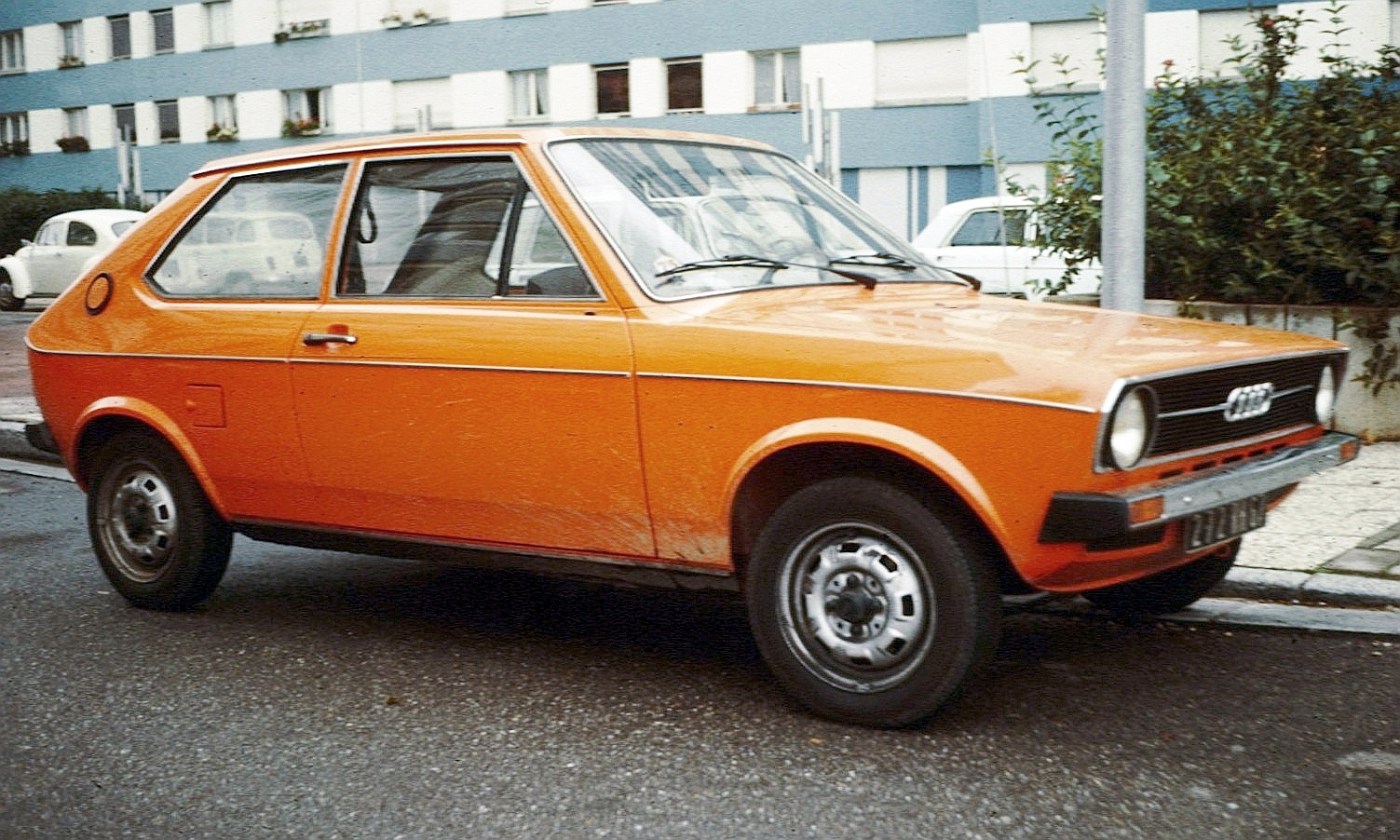
Early Audi 50 – July 1975 photo

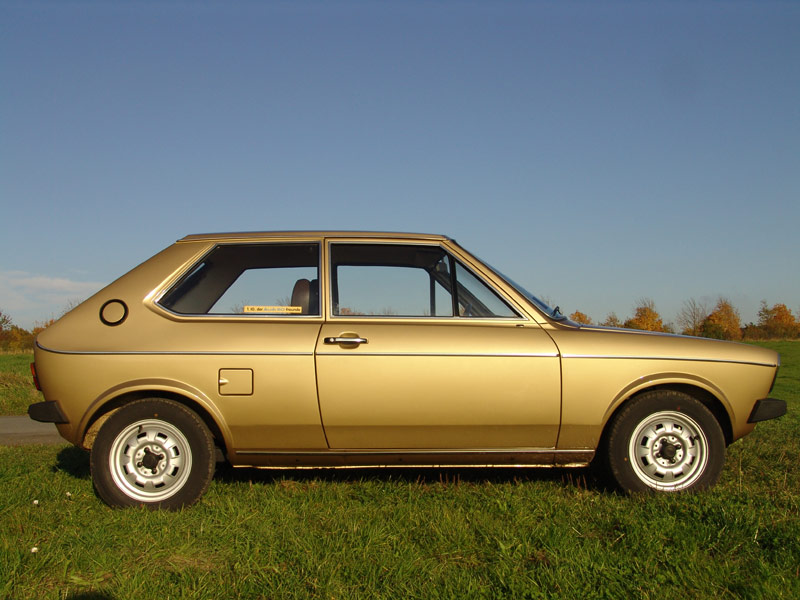
Audi 50 side profile

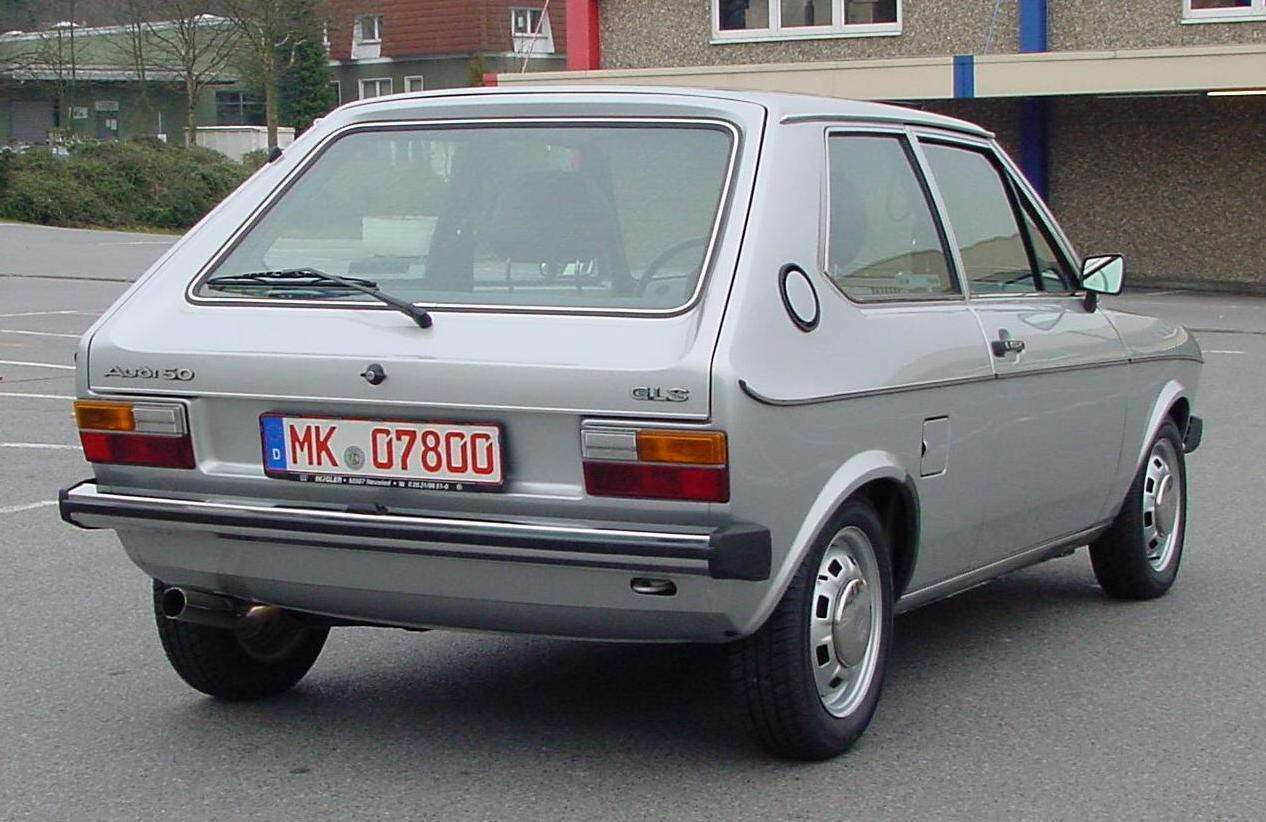
Rear view

The 50 aligned with, and would extend, Audi's line-up of up-to-date, modern technology cars – in contrast to Volkswagen's line-up of almost entirely old-school, rear-engine, rear-wheel-drive layout cars. Only the NSU-developed, Volkswagen K70 badged compact sedan (originally intended to bridge the gap between NSU's small cars and their upper middle-class Ro80), added a modern, front-wheel drive, boxy and stylish mid-market sedan to top VW's range, from 1970.

=== Technology and models ===
The Audi 50 offered a single, three-door hatchback body-style with a folding rear seat for maximum space utilisation and flexibility. A single transversely front-mounted 1,093 cc (67 cu in) water-cooled, overhead camshaft petrol engine produced either a base 37 kW (50 PS; 50 bhp), or a higher 44 kW (60 PS; 59 bhp) output for the LS and GL versions. Metallic paint could be selected, and the GL trim had a more plushly appointed interior, and extra chrome details.

The Audi's front suspension is independent, by MacPherson struts, using telescopic coil over shocks, and single, transverse lower A-arms. The twist-beam rear suspension was simple yet advanced for its day, using a semi-independent, C- or H‑shaped combination of longitudinal (semi-)trailing arms, welded together with a transverse anti-roll bar, also completed by coil springs and shock absorbers. The Audi 50 had standard disc brakes up front, and redundant (split) hydraulic brake circuits.

Model updates starting in 1976, further improving the car's aerodynamics. The GLS replaced the GL, with more standard equipment, including adjustable headrests, and even more chrome on the hubcaps. In 1977, a bigger 1,272 cc (78 cu in) engine became a GLS option.

=== Production ===
The Audi 50 was built by Audi NSU Auto Union AG at the former NSU factory in Neckarsulm, Germany, and at the giant Wolfsburg plant by Volkswagen.

=== Rebadging as Volkswagen Polo ===
The car was also turned into a Volkswagen just six weeks later, rebadged as the Volkswagen Polo, and offered with more choice of engines and other options. The Volkswagen Polo was launched in the home market in September 1974 but appeared in export markets, including the United Kingdom, several months later – in the Netherlands, in March 1975.

The VW Polo twin was cheaper, and marketed a bit more as an economy car.

=== Audi 50 discontinued, while VW Polo continues ===
The model was popular in Europe, both because of its generous specifications for a car of the time, and on account of its relatively low price. The Volkswagen and Audi badged models were sold alongside each other for three years until 1978, but the cheaper Volkswagen Polo outsold the Audi 50 almost immediately, and Audi discontinued the Audi 50 in 1978, after a total production of 180,812 units. A planned facelift, which would have given the Audi 50 a look closer to that of the Audi 100 and Audi 80 was never implemented, because of a holding company board decision that the Audi brand should concentrate on larger, more expensive cars.

The Volkswagen Polo range continued to evolve, with the Volkswagen Derby notchback version, despite being developed by Audi at Ingolstadt, branded as a Volkswagen and launched in 1977. Subsequently, the Volkswagen Polo has evolved through numerous generations to the present day.

=== Successor ===
The Audi 50 had no replacement in the supermini class, until the launch of the significantly larger Audi A2 in November 1999, which was also discontinued in August 2005.

In August 2010, the car was spiritually succeeded by the Audi A1, although, 35 years after the Audi 50 launch, the "supermini" B-segment had grown so much that the first A1 was as big as a 1980s C-segment Volkswagen Golf Mk2.

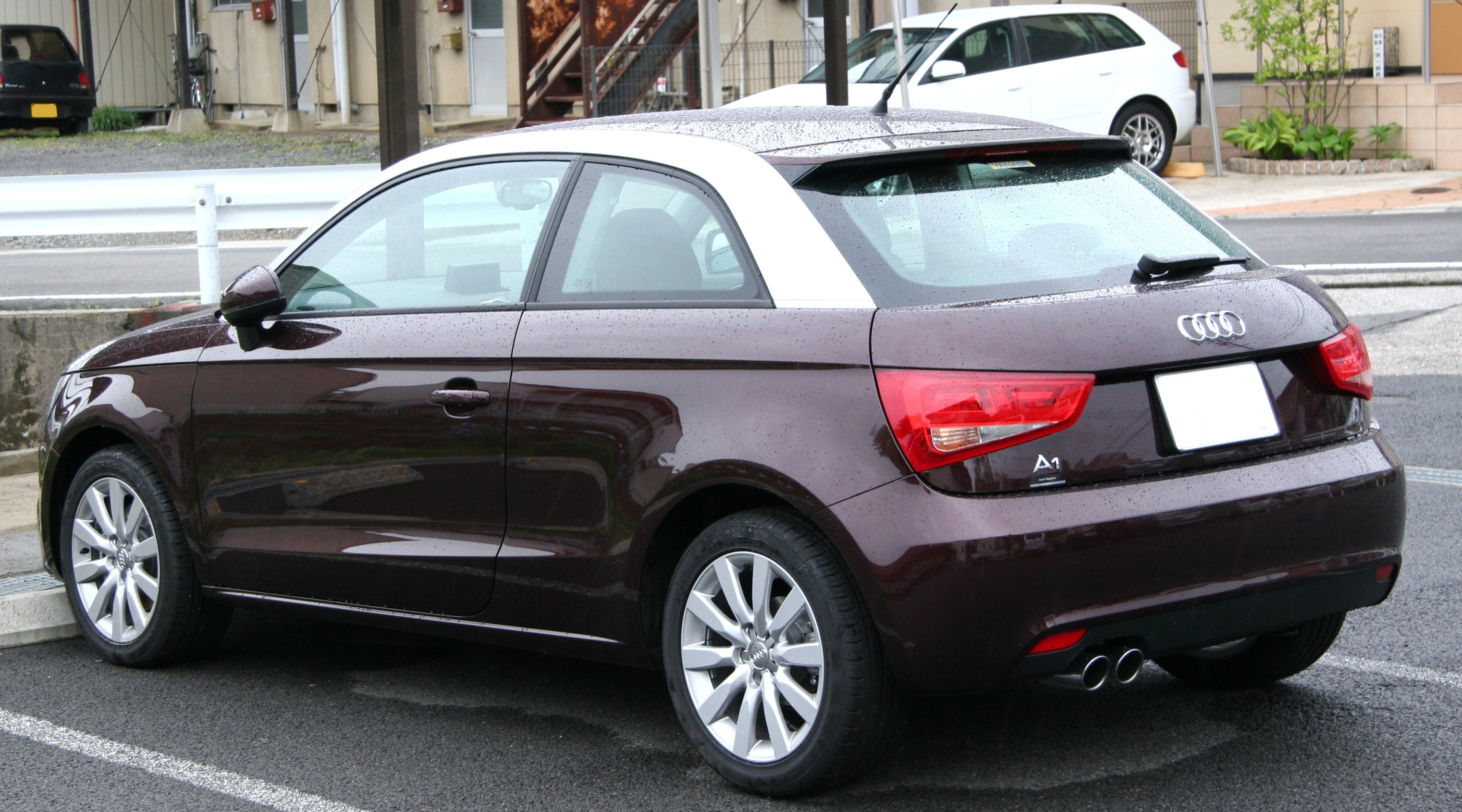
2010 Audi A1 (rear left)
