= Volkswagen Derby =

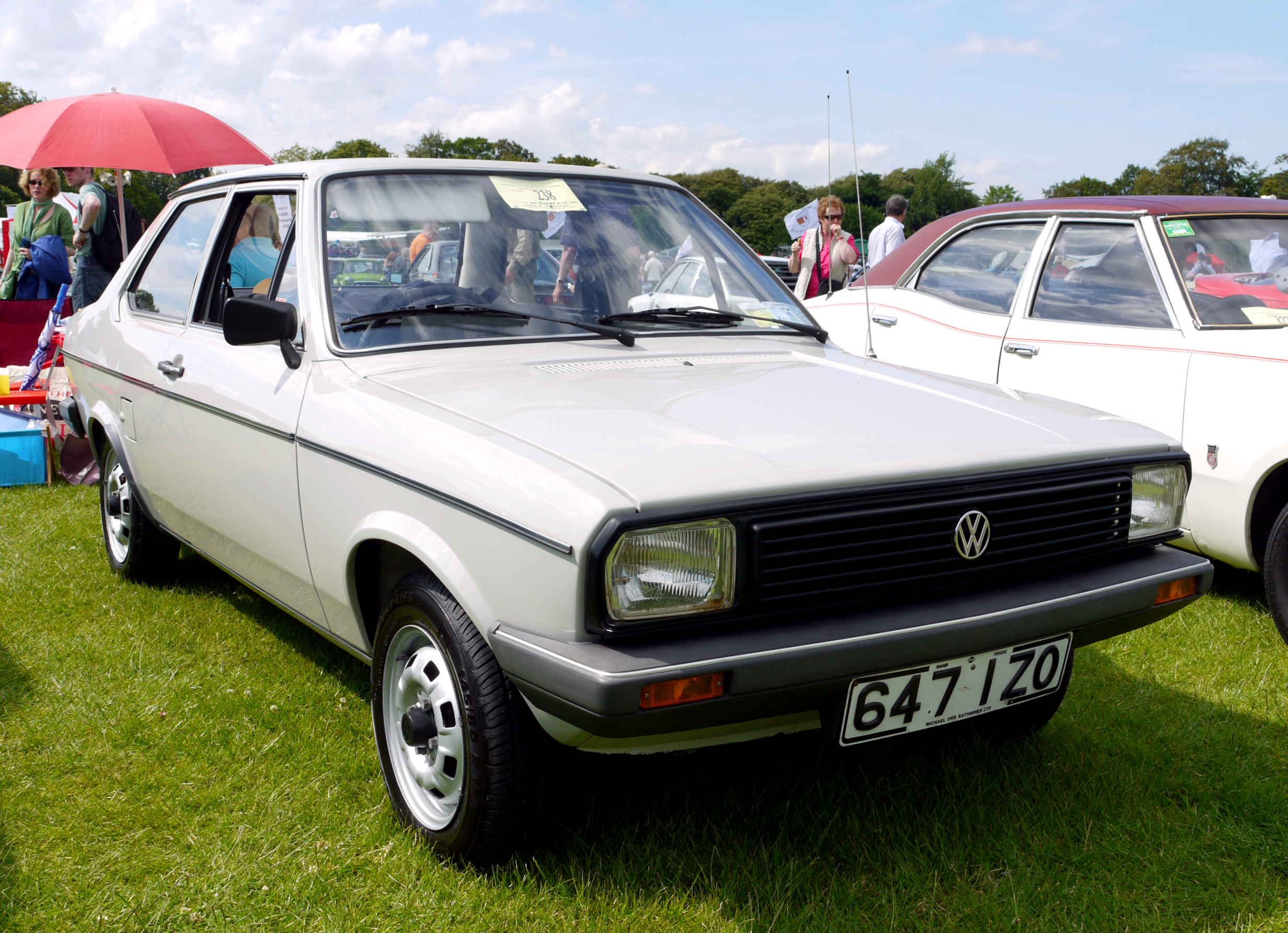

Overview
- Manufacturer: Volkswagen
- Production: 1977–1984
- Assembly: West Germany: Wolfsburg

Body and chassis
- Class: Supermini (B)
- Body style: 2-door saloon
- Layout: Front-engine, front-wheel-drive
- Platform: Volkswagen A01 platform
- Related: Volkswagen Polo

Powertrain
- Engine: 0.9 L I4 (petrol); 1.1 L I4 (petrol); 1.3 L I4 (petrol)
- Transmission: 4-speed manual

Dimensions
- Wheelbase: 2,330 mm (91.7 in)
- Length: 3,866 mm (152.2 in)
- Width: 1,559 mm (61.4 in)
- Height: 1,352 mm (53.2 in)
- Curb weight: 745 kg (1,642 lb)

The Volkswagen Derby was the name first given by German automaker Volkswagen for the commercialization of the booted saloon (three-box) version of its Volkswagen Polo Mk1 supermini, between 1977 and 1981 in Europe. Later, the Derby name was used by the Mexican Volkswagen subsidiary for the Polo Classic Mk3 saloon on its domestic market in the mid-1990s.

== Overview ==
With 72,412 sold in 1977 alone the car was initially popular, outselling the Polo sister model in that year, but sales quickly tailed off in subsequent years.

During 1981, Volkswagen introduced the second generation Polo and the second generation Derby; in 1984 the Derby name was dropped and the saloon version of the Polo became the Volkswagen Polo Classic.

Most parts of the Derby are interchangeable with the Mk1 Polo, and many drivetrain components are compatible with the Mk2 models. Body parts at the rear and also the rear window are different and are directly attributable to the original design version of this vehicle, which was intended to be marketed as the Audi 60. Lights of the early version are the same as the Mk1 Polo and the car which began this design: the Audi 50, which dates to just before the full merger of Audi and Volkswagen.

This was 1979 Semperit Irish Car of the Year in Ireland.

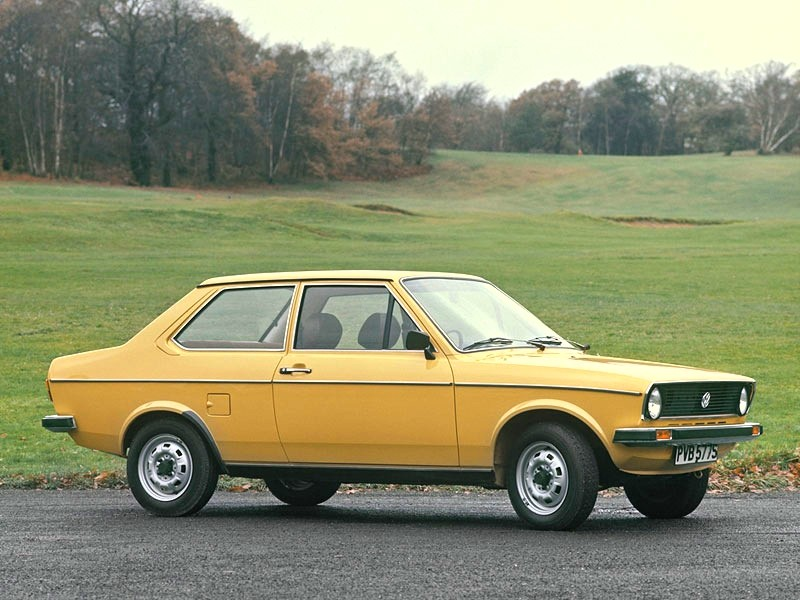
Volkswagen Derby (Denmark)

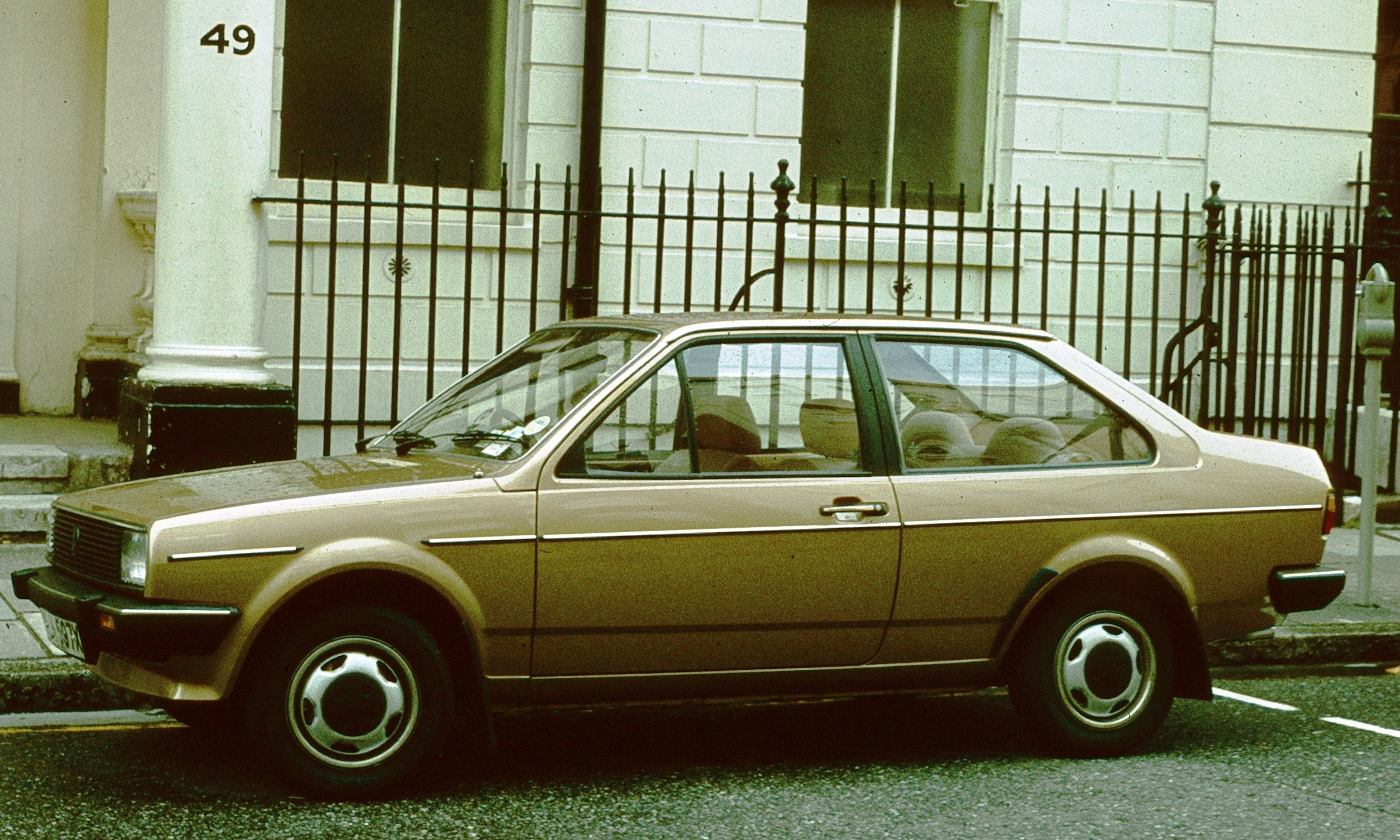
European Volkswagen Derby second generation two-door: introduced 1981 and rebranded as "Polo Classic" in 1984

== Versions ==
In Europe, the Derby was available with 0.9-litre (895 cc), 1.1-litre (1,093 cc) and 1.3-litre (1,272 cc) four-cylinder engines, with 40, 50 and 60 bhp respectively. The Derby Formel E ("Formula E"), offered in 1981 only, was an economy-optimised Derby featuring, among other things, a longer ratio gearbox, automatic engine turn-off when idling and a high compression version on the 1.1 L engine that demanded super instead of regular petrol. The Formel E concept was also available on other contemporary VW and Audi models.

The following versions were available:

- 900 L
- 1100 S
- 1100 LS
- 1100 LX
- 1100 CLS
- 1300 LS
- 1300 GL
- 1300 GLS
- 1100 Formel E

In 1979, the Derby underwent a facelift together with the Polo. The restyle attempted to separate the styling of the Polo and the Derby more significantly, which also brought the styling of the Derby into line with its bigger counterpart, the Volkswagen Jetta. These revisions included rectangular headlamps, a restyled grille and plastic bumpers, together with some interior changes including a new dashboard and instrumentation taken from the Mk1 Golf.

In 1984, the Derby was re-badged as the Polo Classic in Europe, and the Derby's unique squared headlamp front end, which had been carried over from the Mk1, was replaced with standard Polo equipment.

In the UK, the Derby name was dropped with the Mk1, and the Polo Classic name was used from the Mk2's inception. However, early Polo Classics still retained the Derby styling. In turn, the "Classic" branding for the saloon was dropped in 1987 which meant that the Polo and Derby integration was complete.

== Mexican Volkswagen Derby (1995–2008) ==
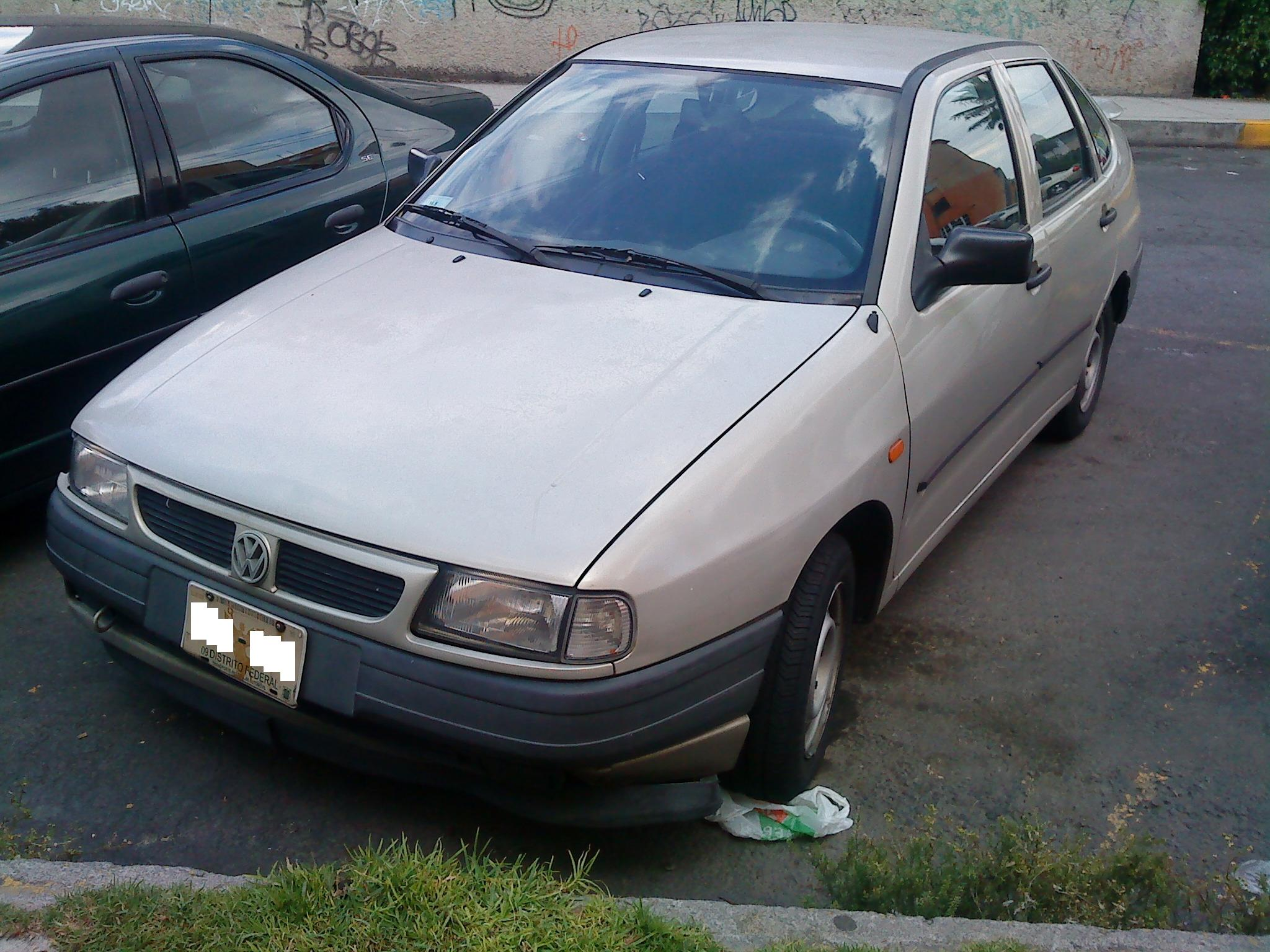
1994–1997 Volkswagen Derby (pre-facelift)

In the mid-1990s decade, Volkswagen de México started to use the Derby name in order to introduce an all-new affordable saloon toward its domestic market. Within Volkswagen's local lineup, this new model was intended to be positioned in a segment between the old, yet bestseller -by then- classic VW Sedán/Beetle/Bug and the Mk3 Golf-Jetta, the brand's flagships.

Launched by November 1994, the Mexican-market first Derbys actually were rebadged units of the SEAT Córdoba Mk1 model, produced by the VW Group's SEAT division. These units came to Mexico produced from the SEAT Spanish manufacture until late 1995, featuring just the original SEAT badges swapped by VW emblems instead (Volkswagen Group did not launch the SEAT brand in Mexico until 2001). By 1996, domestic-target units were assembled at the Volkswagen Mexico's Puebla facilities, mostly featuring Spain-sourced parts.

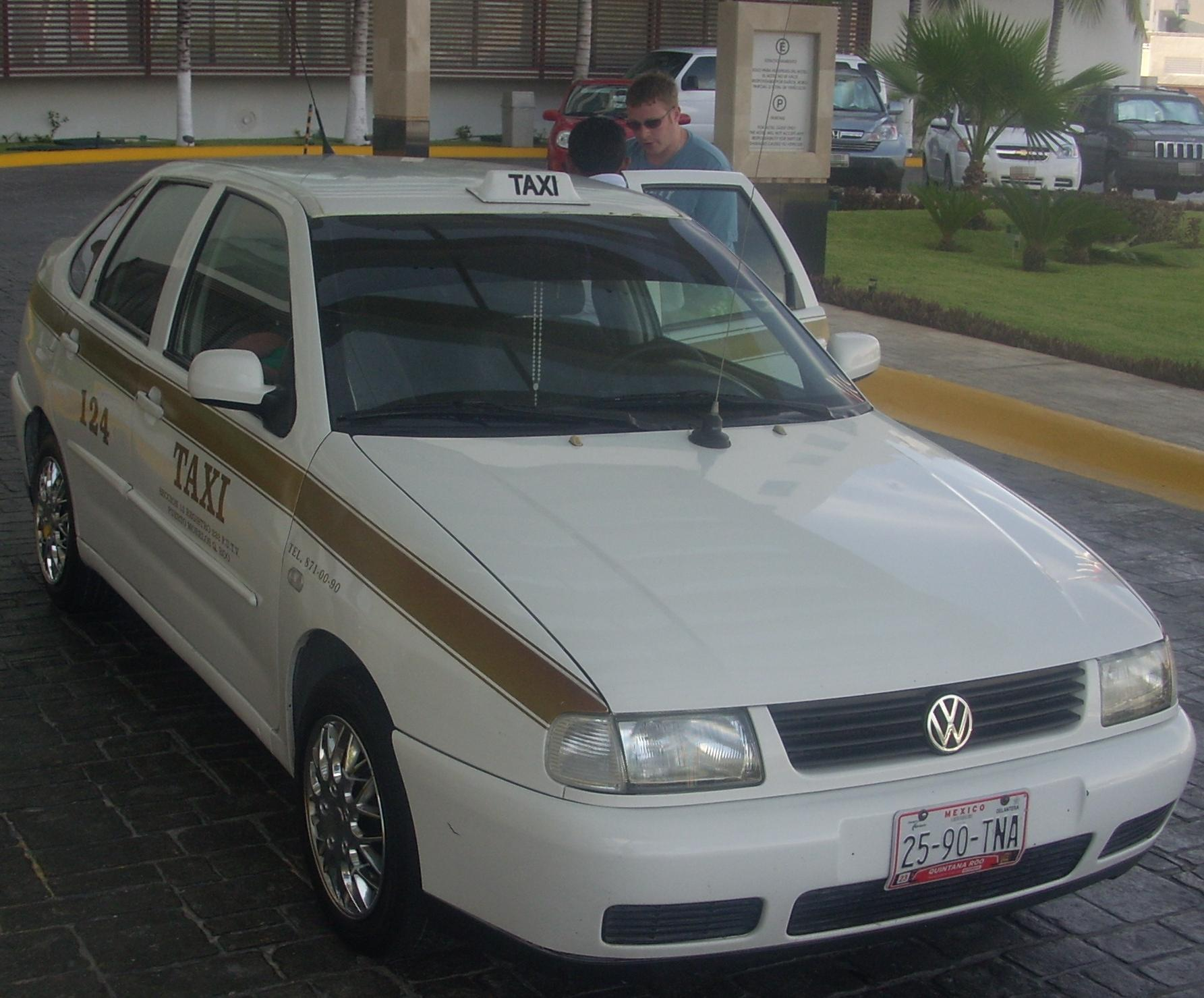
1998–2005 Volkswagen Derby (first facelift)

Production in Mexico of these units (as first Derbys) was interrupted at some point in 1997, in order to re-launch the car as an all-new mid-1998 model. By the time, the Mexican Volkswagen "new Derby" would actually be the European-market Volkswagen Polo Classic Mk3 (Typ 6N). It came with the 90 hp 1.8 L VW engine coupled to a 5-speed manual gearbox.

In 2002, production of the Mk3 Polo Classic ceased in Europe in favour of the new Mk4 Polo production, but continued in South America, at the Volkswagen Argentina facilities specifically, where it was already being manufactured and offered to its domestic market as Polo Classic, as in Europe. Thus, Volkswagen Mexico continued to offer this model in its lineup as Derby, importing the Argentinian-produced units. A comfort version was offered as Derby "Wolfsburg Edition". A bit later, Trendline and Sportline editions were introduced (featuring a 2.0 L engine for the second one).

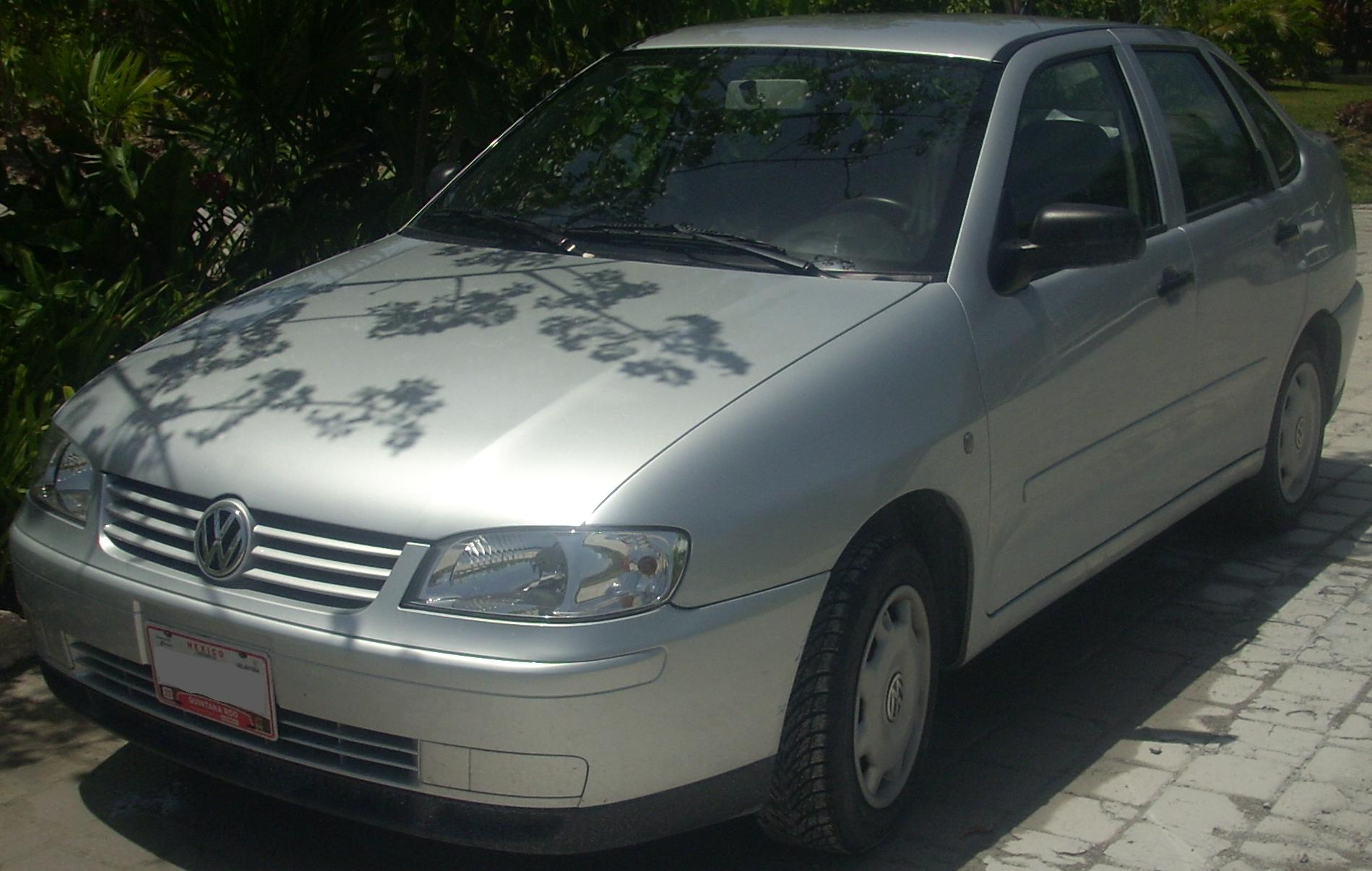
2006–2008 Volkswagen Derby (second facelift)

Circa 2006, the Argentinian-produced Mk3 Polo Classic got a slight "makeover" (Typ 6NB), mainly spotted on the headlights, front grille, taillights and bumpers. The new design of these components got pretty much the same design style on those from the previously applied facelift to the SEAT Cordoba Mk1, back in 1999 (Ultimately, both the Cordoba and the Polo Classic Mk3 shared the same platform). Volkswagen Mexico remained commercializing this renewed model as Derby until late 2008, when it was finally phased out, in favor of the introduction of the Brazilian-sourced VWPQ24 Platform-based Volkswagen Voyage/Gol Mk5.

A lightweight cargo vehicle was designed around the Mk3 Polo Classic and traded in the Mexican and South American markets as the Volkswagen Caddy first, and later just as Volkswagen Van.
