= Berger BX-110 =

BX-110

General information
- Type: Utility helicopter
- Manufacturer: Hans Berger
- Number built: 1

History
- First flight: 3 June 1974

The Berger BX-110 was a prototype light helicopter built in Switzerland in the early 1970s. The single example (registration HB-YAK) was built by Hans Berger, a Swiss inventor and helicopter dealer. It was powered by a Wankel automotive engine and remained on the Swiss civil register until 1994. It was of conventional light helicopter configuration, with pilot and passenger sitting side by side under a large perspex bubble canopy, with the tail rotor carried on a tubular boom. The powerplant and fuel tanks were located behind the cabin, and the three-bladed main rotor had foldable blades. Landing gear was originally of skid type.

Originally powered by a converted NSU Ro 80 Wankel-type automotive engine, Berger later fitted a BMW 6012 turbine to the aircraft, and later still another adapted automotive Wankel engine, this time from a Mazda RX-7. At the time of the latter conversion, the undercarriage was changed to tricycle configuration.

== Specifications (final configuration) ==
General characteristics

- Crew: one pilot
- Capacity: 1 passenger
- Length: 6.05 m (19 ft 10 in)
- Height: 2.57 m (8 ft 5 in)
- Empty weight: 400 kg (880 lb)
- Gross weight: 720 kg (1,590 lb)
- Powerplant: 1 × Mazda RX-7 automotive engine , 86 kW (115 hp)
- Main rotor diameter: 7.40 m (24 ft 3 in)
- Main rotor area: 43.0 m^{2} (463 sq ft)

Performance

- Maximum speed: 175 km/h (109 mph, 95 kn)
- Service ceiling: 2,800 m (9,184 ft)
- Rate of climb: 4.0 m/s (790 ft/min)
