= Berger-Helicopter =

Berger-Helicopter was created by Hans Berger, a noted Swiss inventor, to develop a series of light helicopters of his own design. The BX-50 of 1961 and the BX-110 of 1974 were built as prototypes, with the BX-110 proving sound enough to earn a certificate of airworthiness from the Swiss Board of Aviation. Besides these two machines, Berger's other inventions were a jet-powered car, and numerous other helicopter designs. Professionally, Berger was the sales representative for Brantly in Switzerland and Liechtenstein.

== Unbuilt Berger helicopter projects ==
- Berger HB-25 - 4 seat design with turbine power
- Berger BX-50
- Berger BX-110
- Berger BX-111 - 2 seat design with Wankel-type engine and coaxial rotors
- Berger BX-200 - 2 seat design with turbine power
- Berger BX-300 - 3 seat design with stub wings, to be powered by Turboméca turbine
