= Berger BX-50 =

BX-50

General information
- Type: Recreational helicopter
- Manufacturer: Hans Berger
- Designer: Hans Berger
- Number built: 1

History
- First flight: 16 March 1961

The Berger BX-50 was an experimental helicopter developed by Swiss inventor Hans Berger in 1961. Built largely at home, it was a single-seat design of conventional configuration with a bubble canopy, a two-blade rotor, and skid undercarriage. The upper portion of the canopy could slide to admit the pilot. After a number of test flights, the rotor was replaced with a semi-rigid three-blade design and the skids with tricycle, wheeled undercarriage. Not long after, it was damaged beyond repair and abandoned. In photographs, the registration number HB-XBC is visible, but this was never actually issued by Swiss authorities.

== Specifications ==
General characteristics

- Crew: one pilot
- Length: 5.35 m (17 ft 7 in)
- Diameter: 6.50 m (21 ft 4 in)
- Height: 2.28 m (7 ft 6 in)
- Wing area: 33.2 m^{2} (357 sq ft)
- Empty weight: 258 kg (569 lb)
- Gross weight: 410 kg (904 lb)
- Powerplant: 1 × Continental C90 , 63 kW (85 hp)

Performance

- Maximum speed: 140 km/h (87 mph, 76 kn)
- Range: 360 km (224 mi, 195 nmi)
- Rate of climb: 4.0 m/s (790 ft/min)
