= Claus Luthe =

German car designer (1932–2008)

Claus Johannes Luthe
- Born: December 8, 1932; Wuppertal, Germany
- Died: March 17, 2008 (aged 75); Munich, Germany
- Employer(s): Voll, Fiat, NSU, Audi, BMW
- Spouse: Gertrude Luthe (m. 1953–2008)
- Children: 4

Claus Luthe (December 8, 1932 – March 17, 2008) was a German car designer, noted for his design work on the NSU Ro 80, Volkswagen K70 and numerous seminal models from Audi and BMW. Luthe was a pioneer of aerodynamics and digital design within the automotive field.

On his death in 2008, The Guardian called Luthe "one of the most important figures in postwar European car styling."

== Career ==
Luthe was one of the first to embrace digital tools to improve and accelerate the process so that the designers could pass information directly to the engineers in digital form, he changed the methodology of designing into what everybody does today. — Robert Cumberford

Luthe was born in 1932 in Wuppertal, the second-oldest of five children in a deeply Catholic family. His father died on the Eastern Front when he was just 12 years old. Luthe originally wanted to follow his elder brother into a career in architecture, but took an apprenticeship from 1948 to 1954 as a coachbuilding student at Karosseriebauer Voll in Würzburg, where he worked on proposals for buses. After completing his apprenticeship, he joined Deutsche Fiat AG, where he was, among other activities, responsible for the frontal styling of the original 500.

=== NSU ===
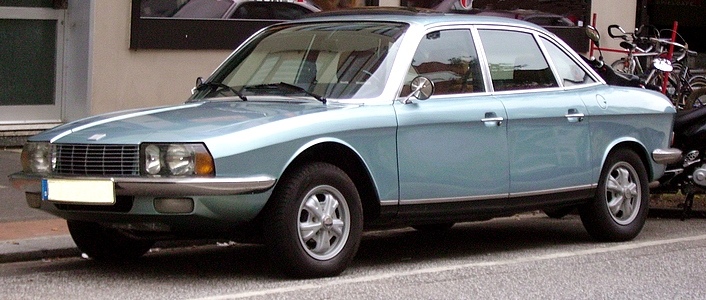
NSU Ro 80

He soon, however, joined NSU, where he was instrumental in developing the company's design department. Luthe's first designs at NSU were the second-generation NSU Prinz 4 and the NSU Wankel Spider.

The Prinz had a distinct resemblance to its contemporary Chevrolet Corvair; the original design had already been finalized when BMW launched its new 700 model in 1959, with a very similar design. NSU management decided that changes were needed, and an NSU board member who had just returned from the United States described the Corvair design to Luthe, who incorporated some of the elements into the Prinz's bathtub design.

With the growth of the German economy, NSU was interested in offering larger cars to the growing middle class, and in 1962 NSU president Gerd Stieler von Heydekampf authorized the development of a mid-sized front-wheel drive sedan, using the company's revolutionary new Wankel engine technology. Chief engineer Ewald Praxl was given the assignment to develop the car, originally envisaged at 800 kg and 80 hp, starting from a clean sheet.

Luthe was given responsibility for the design, working with the engineering team of Walter Froede and Georg Jungbluth, to utilize the compact Wankel engine, itself created by Felix Wankel. Luthe created a clean wedge shape with a large glasshouse, while the engineering team added innovations such as four-wheel independent suspension, semi-automatic transmission and inboard disc brakes to reduce unsprung mass. The Ro 80 still stands today as a milestone in automotive design. It had an initial drag coefficient of only 0.35, remarkably low for its time, even though it was not tested in a wind tunnel until the design was largely finalized. The final production models dropped the drag coefficient to 0.34.

"After these wind tunnel tests, the outer shape of the body was not modified at all. We got, however, new insights into the airflow through the engine compartment and the possible air outlets for the passenger room. These could have been moved to the rear end of the boot, but the improvement was so marginal and the cost involved so high that these outlets remained in the C-pillar."

In late 1967, when the remarkable new Ro 80 was introduced at the Frankfurt Motor Show, it did not initially gain universal acceptance for its unconventional wedge-like design. However, sales proved to be strong, and by the spring of 1969, there were still waiting lists for the car. The early engines suffered from heavy wear of the rotor tip seals in the innovative Wankel engine, causing severe financial losses for NSU. 37,204 Ro 80s were built by the time production finally ceased in 1977, but by that time the company had long been part of Audi, a Volkswagen subsidiary.

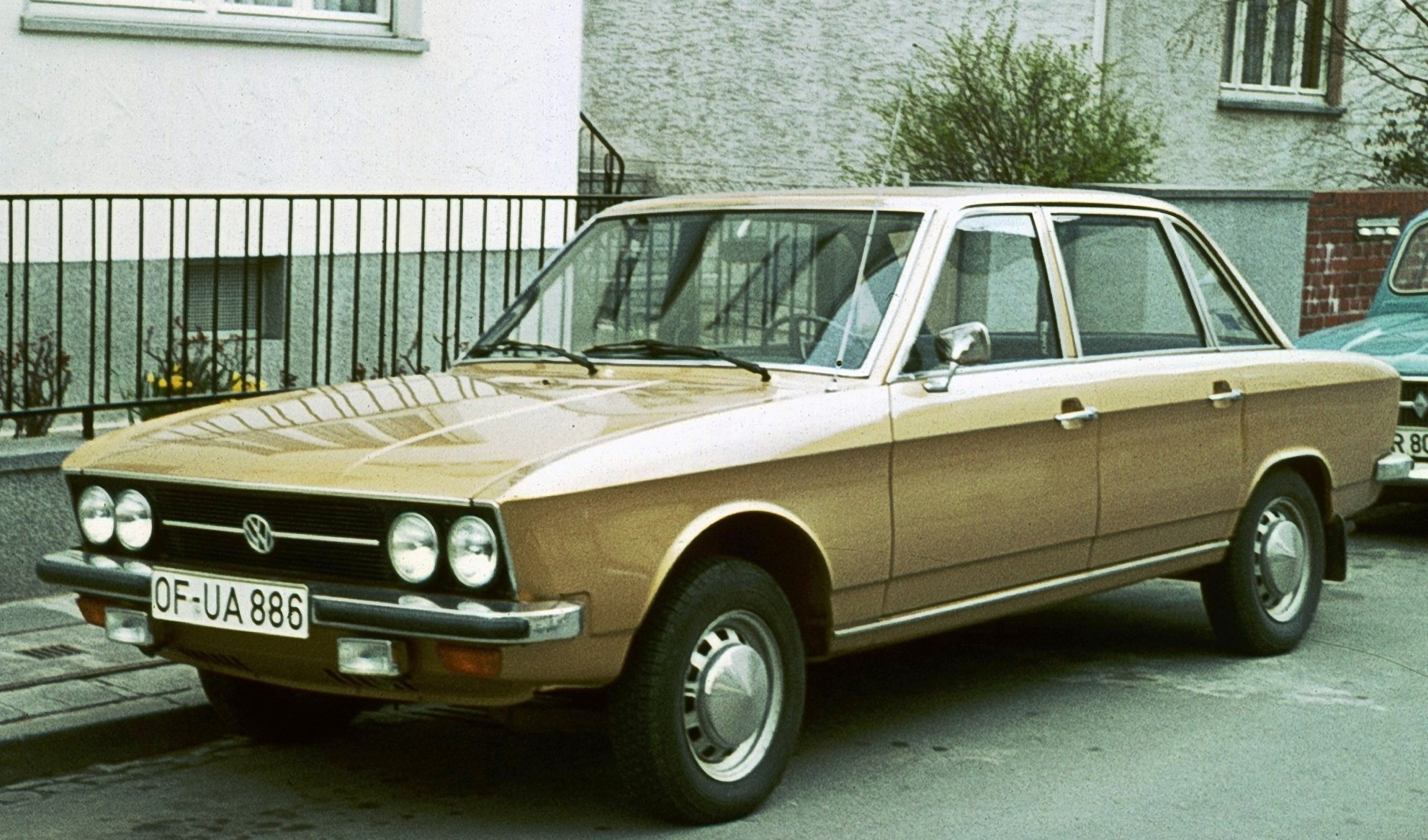
Volkswagen K70

The K70 was originally created by Luthe as the NSU K70, to fill the gap between the Prinz and the Ro 80, but came to the market in 1971 as a Volkswagen K70, after considerable delays, partly due to the Volkswagen acquisition of NSU, and with modifications to Luthe's original design.

=== Audi ===
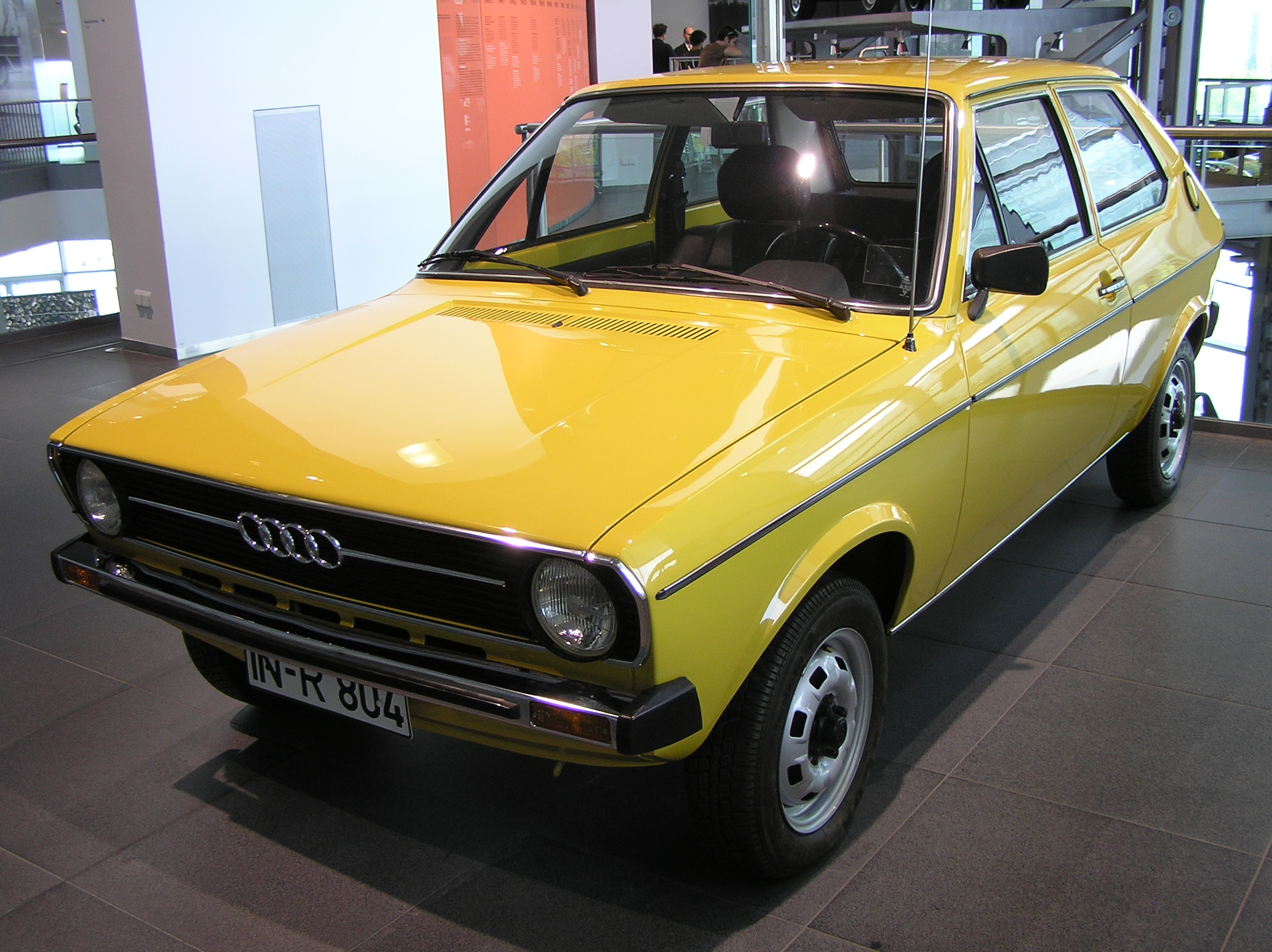
Audi 50

Following the takeover of NSU by Volkswagen, Luthe continued to work for Audi from 1971 to 1976. His first project at Audi was the Audi 50, on which the original Volkswagen Polo was based. Luthe completed the styling of the tidy three-door hatchback design, as well as guiding the interior design; the concept of the dashboard design is remarkably similar to that proposed by Luthe (but rejected by the NSU management) in the original Ro 80 prototypes. While the Bertone design house was consulted on the near-final design, only modifying a few small details, such as the upsweep of the chrome trim on the side. The 50 was introduced in August 1974, just three months after the debut of the Volkswagen Golf.

He subsequently designed the interior of the second-generation Audi 100 C2, and produced the initial proposals for the Audi 80 B2, although the design was modified substantially, and finalized by Giorgetto Giugiaro, after Luthe left Audi.

=== BMW ===
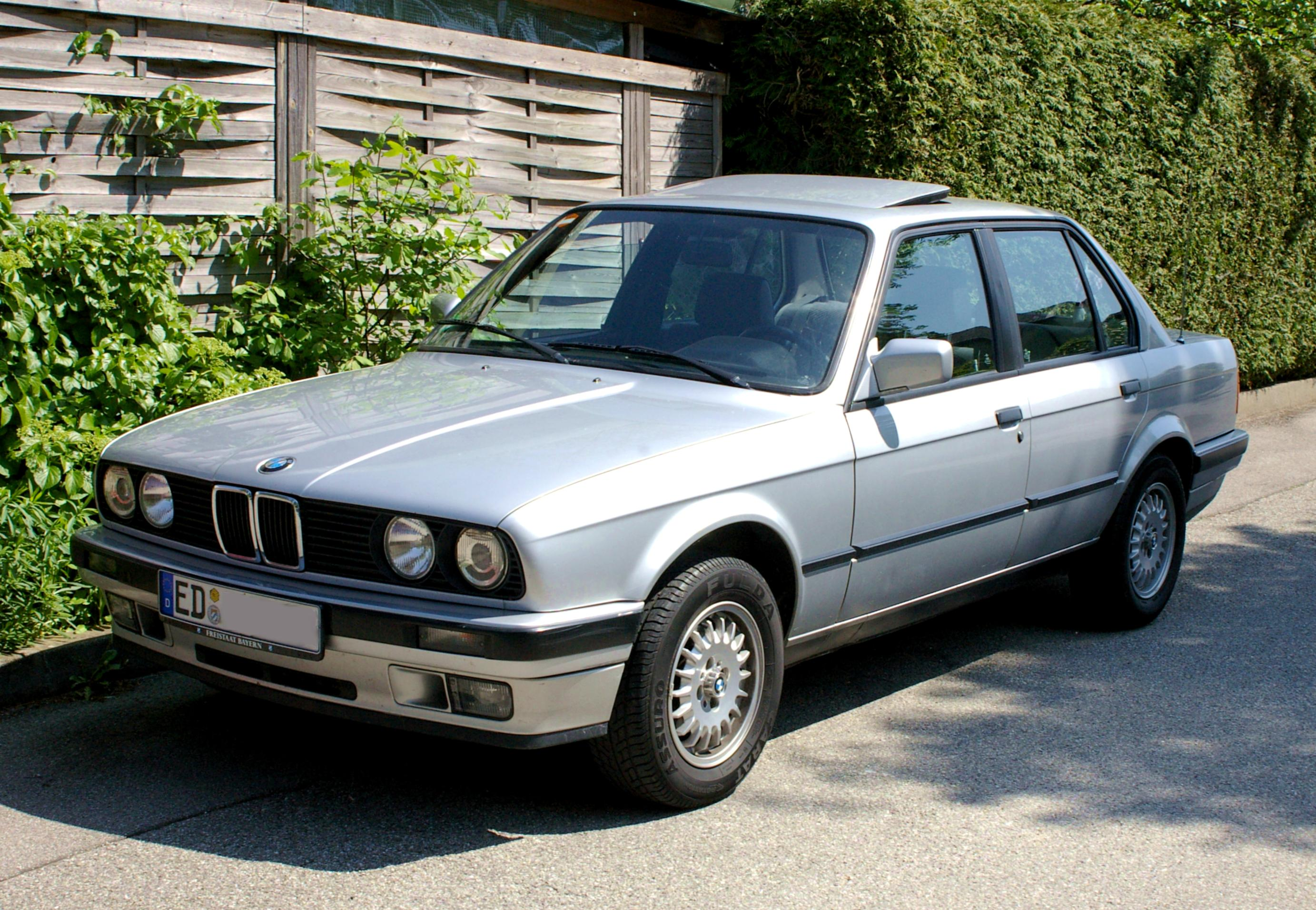
BMW E30 3-series

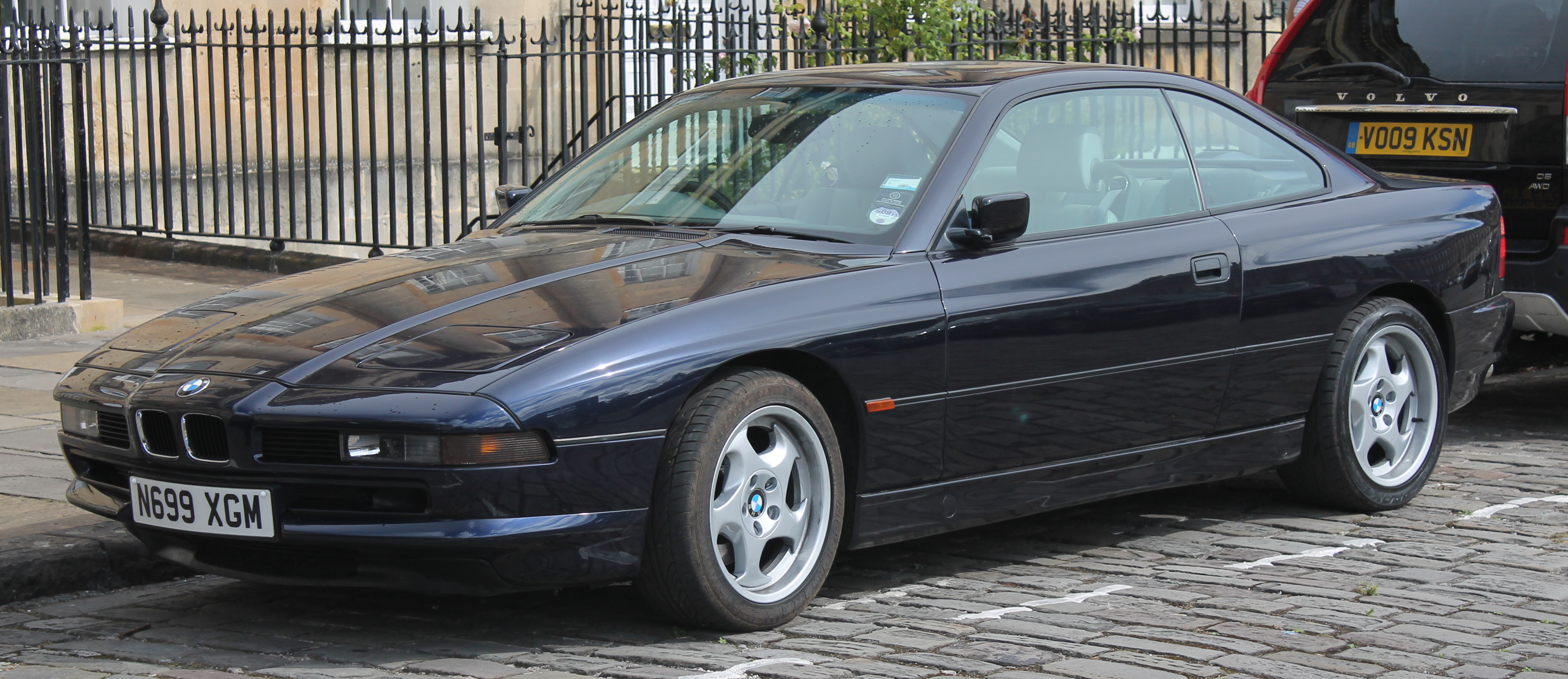
BMW E31 8-Series

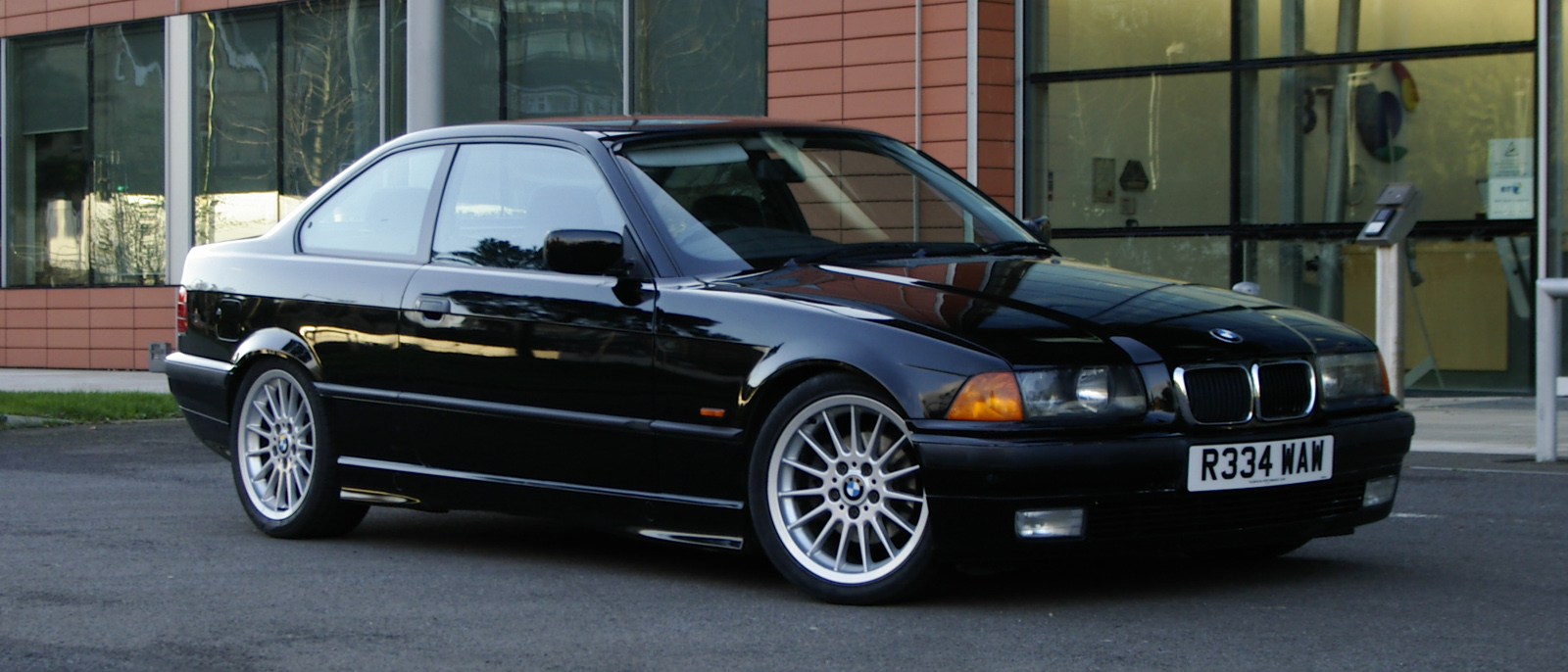
BMW E36 3-Series

In 1976 Luthe succeeded Paul Bracq as chief designer with BMW, and began to move the Bavarian manufacturer's designs in a more creative, stylish direction. At the time, the company offered a full line of products, from the E21 3 Series to the E23 7 Series, all with relatively conservative designs developed under Bracq's direction.

Luthe, then, was tasked with developing a facelift for the aging E12 5 Series within a budget of US$100 million. Luthe solved the cost restraint problem by reusing the passenger compartment structure of the E12, but with new front and rear clips and a new interior. Significant technical developments, such as new front and rear axles as well as climate control, were also added, and eventually the project cost for the new model, the E28 reached US$400 million. However, the BMW management was satisfied that the improvements in the E28 were well worth the costs.

The next priority was the development of a successor for the E21 3 Series. In order to broaden the appeal of the model, a four-door version was to be added. Luthe maintained a low front profile and the familiar dual round headlights in the E30 successor model, distinguishing the model from the larger 5 Series, while creating a smoother profile, as with the E28.

After the launch of the E30, BMW chairman Herbert Quandt set a challenge for the design team to better the Mercedes-Benz W126, the benchmark in European luxury vehicles at the time. The W126 was a highly conservative design, penned by Bruno Sacco, but Luthe took a far more radical approach. A sleek, streamlined, wedge-shaped body, in some ways reminiscent of the trend-setting Ro 80, and unconventional L-shaped taillights, the new E32 was very much the antithesis of the W126. In spite of Luthe's concerns, the BMW board approved the design with enthusiasm.

He then supervised the design of the E36 3 Series, and by 1990 he was named the head of BMW's design department, supervising the creation of the 1989 E31 8 Series coupe, and the third-generation E34 5 Series.

== Personal life ==
Luthe was married with four children. He left his post at BMW after being accused of fatally stabbing his 33-year-old, chronically drug-dependent oldest son, Ulrich after an argument on Good Friday in 1990. He was eventually convicted of manslaughter and sentenced to 33 months in prison, but was released before having to serve the complete sentence. He later worked as an external consultant for BMW.

== See also ==
- Audi
- BMW
- Felix Wankel
- NSU Ro 80
- NSU Spider
- Wankel engine
