= BMW 6012 =

1960s German turboshaft aircraft engine

6012
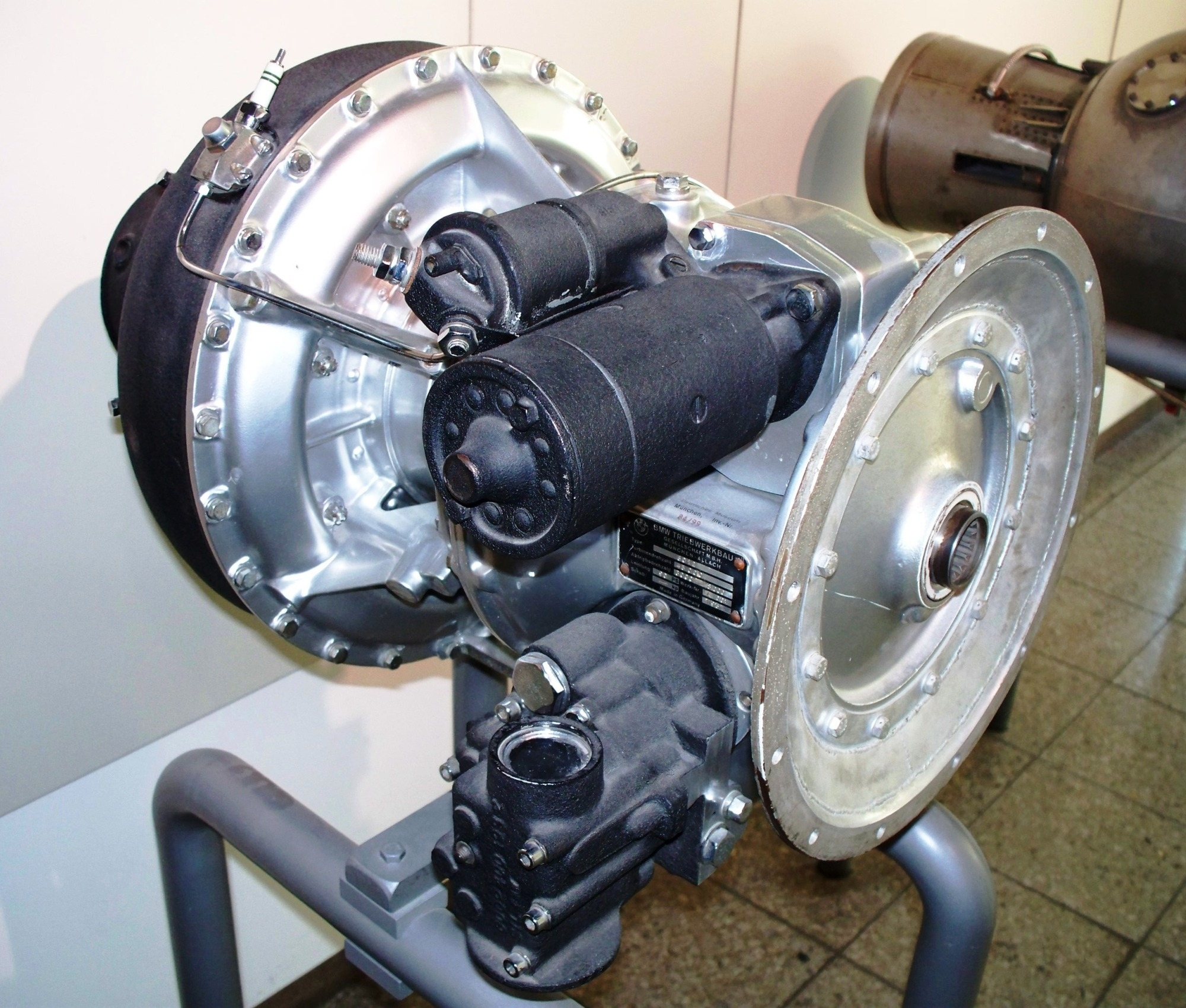
- BMW 6012 engine on display at the Deutsches Museum
- Type: Turboshaft
- National origin: Germany
- Manufacturer: BMW
- First run: c.1960
- Major applications: Dornier Do 32

The BMW 6012 (later MTU 6012) was a German turboshaft and gas generator engine. Designed in the late-1950s by BMW the engine powered the Dornier Do 32 helicopter and was also used as an auxiliary power unit (APU).

== Variants ==
6012A
Basic version.
6012B 1
De-rated version.
6012B 2
Version designed to produce 19 kW (25 shp) continuously to 7,000 m (23,000 ft).
6012L
Gas generator version with additional gear-driven compressor.

== Applications ==
- Berger BX-110
- Dornier Do 32
- Dornier Do 32K

== Specifications (6012A) ==
Data from Jane's All the World's Aircraft 1965-66.

==== General characteristics ====
- Type: Turboshaft
- Length: 700 mm (28 in)
- Diameter: 380 mm (15 in)
- Dry weight: 45 kilograms (99 lb)

==== Components ====
- Compressor: Single-stage radial
- Combustors: Annular (disc shaped)
- Turbine: Single-stage radial
- Fuel type: Jet fuel
- Oil system: Dry sump, gear-type pumps

==== Performance ====
- Maximum power output: 75 kW (100 shp)
- Overall pressure ratio: 3:1
- Fuel consumption: 57 kg (125 lb) per hour at maximum power

== See also ==
Comparable engines

- Turbomeca Palouste

Related lists

- List of aircraft engines
