= Dornier Do 32 =

1962 light helicopter

Do 32
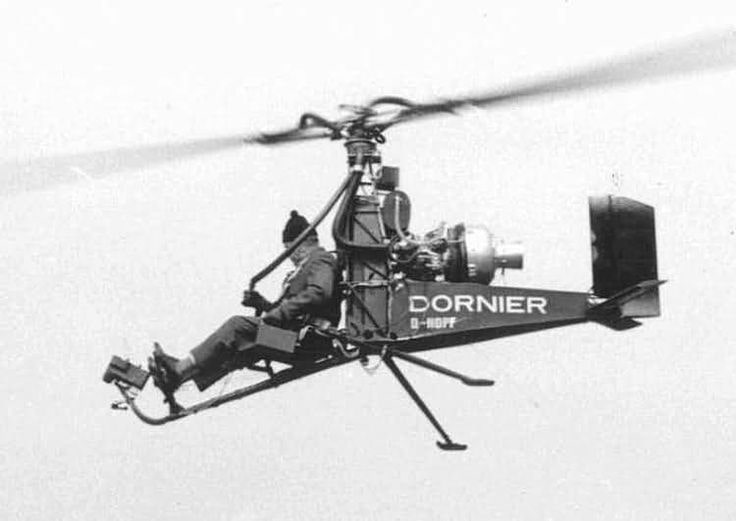

General information
- Type: Ultra light helicopter
- National origin: Federal German Republic
- Manufacturer: Dornier Werke GmbH
- Number built: 4

History
- First flight: 29 June 1962

The Dornier Do 32E was a simple, collapsible one-man helicopter, designed for military use in Germany in the 1960s. Despite initial hopes of large orders and some proposed civilian roles, only three flew.

== Development ==
In the early 1960s, the German Army had an interest in a small helicopter for observation and communications duties that could be folded up compactly enough to be carried in a trailer pulled by a jeep. The Do 32, like several other light helicopters of the time such as the Fairey Ultra-light Helicopter and the Sud-Ouest Djinn, used rotor tip jets to drive the rotor blades. The advantage of tip drive is the absence of torque reaction, making a tail rotor unnecessary, saving weight and simplifying control of the aircraft. Dornier used a small gas turbine to drive a compressor, which fed air out through tubes in the rotors to the tips.

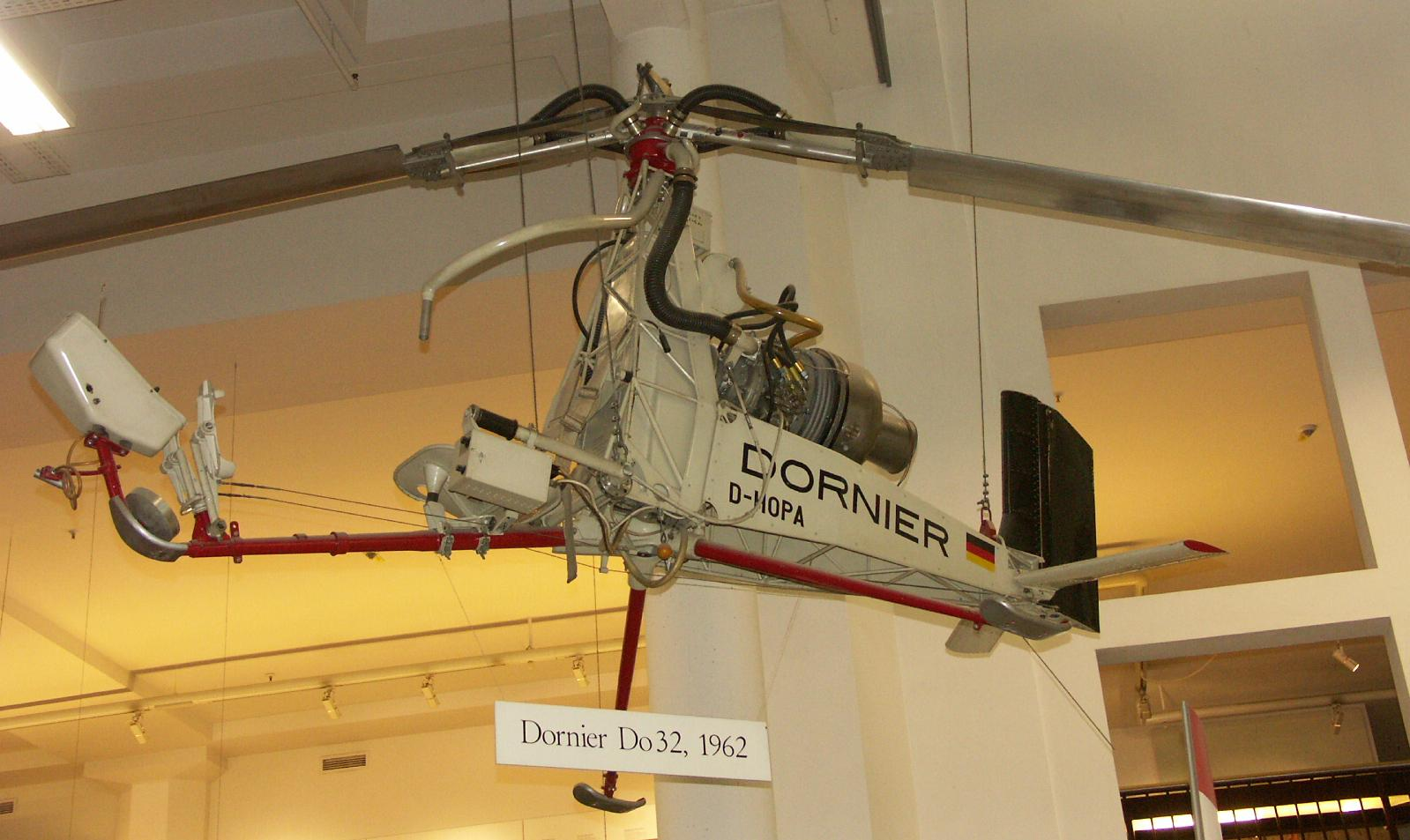
Fourth prototype at the Deutsches Museum

The Do 32 was structurally very simple, with a square section, tapering fuselage behind the pilot. The BMW 6012L turbine and compressor were placed on top of the fuselage, immediately behind the rotor pylon. Its exhaust impinged upon a large rectangular rudder, built to resist thermal stresses, for yaw control. The horizontal tailplane was swept. The pilot sat in front of the rotor pylon, on a simple seat, carried on the lower longerons. He controlled the plane of the two-bladed rotor directly with a long curved hanging arm, and its pitch with a conventional collective pitch lever by his left side. The rudder pedals were almost straight out in front of him on a strut that also carried, beyond his feet, some simple instruments. This member also formed part of the simple three-legged undercarriage, each strut ending with an unsprung foot.

The Do 32 first flew on 29 June 1962, and much flight testing was done with this aircraft and two further prototypes. The aircraft was also stowed in a trailer, transported, unfolded and flown. The heavy rotor could be spun up before takeoff with zero pitch, containing enough energy for a rapid initial vertical climb or jump start, autogyro fashion. All three were eventually lost in accidents with different causes. Though Dornier had hopes of large Army orders, none followed. Agricultural applications were considered, and there was a design project for the Do 32Z, a two-seat version with a bigger engine, but no more manned Do 32s flew. The unflown fourth prototype is on display at the Deutsches Museum, painted as the first prototype D-HOPA. The Do 32U was a pilotless version of the Do 32E, very similar, apart from the missing seat. The Do 32K, developed into the Do 34, was also an unmanned drone with compressed air-driven rotors, but without a fuselage.

== Operator ==
Germany

== Specifications ==
Do-32 3-view

Data from Green 1964, p. 255

General characteristics

- Crew: one
- Length: 3.42 m (11 ft 3 in) fuselage
- Height: 1.89 m (6 ft 2 in)
- Empty weight: 147 kg (325 lb)
- Gross weight: 270 kg (596 lb)
- Max takeoff weight: 321 kg (707 lb)
- Powerplant: 1 × BMW 6012L gas turbine driving compressor, 67 kW (90 hp)
- Main rotor diameter: 7.5 m (24 ft 7 in)

Performance

- Maximum speed: 119 km/h (74 mph, 64 kn)
- Cruise speed: 100 km/h (62 mph, 54 kn)
- Range: 90 km (56 mi, 49 nmi)
- Endurance: 50 min
- Rate of climb: 4.0 m/s (780 ft/min) maximum inclined rate

== See also ==
Related development

- Dornier Kiebitz

Aircraft of comparable role, configuration, and era

- Gyrodyne Rotorcycle
- XH-26 Jet Jeep
