= Dornier Kiebitz =

1970s German battlefield reconnaissance system

Do 32K/Do 34 Kiebitz
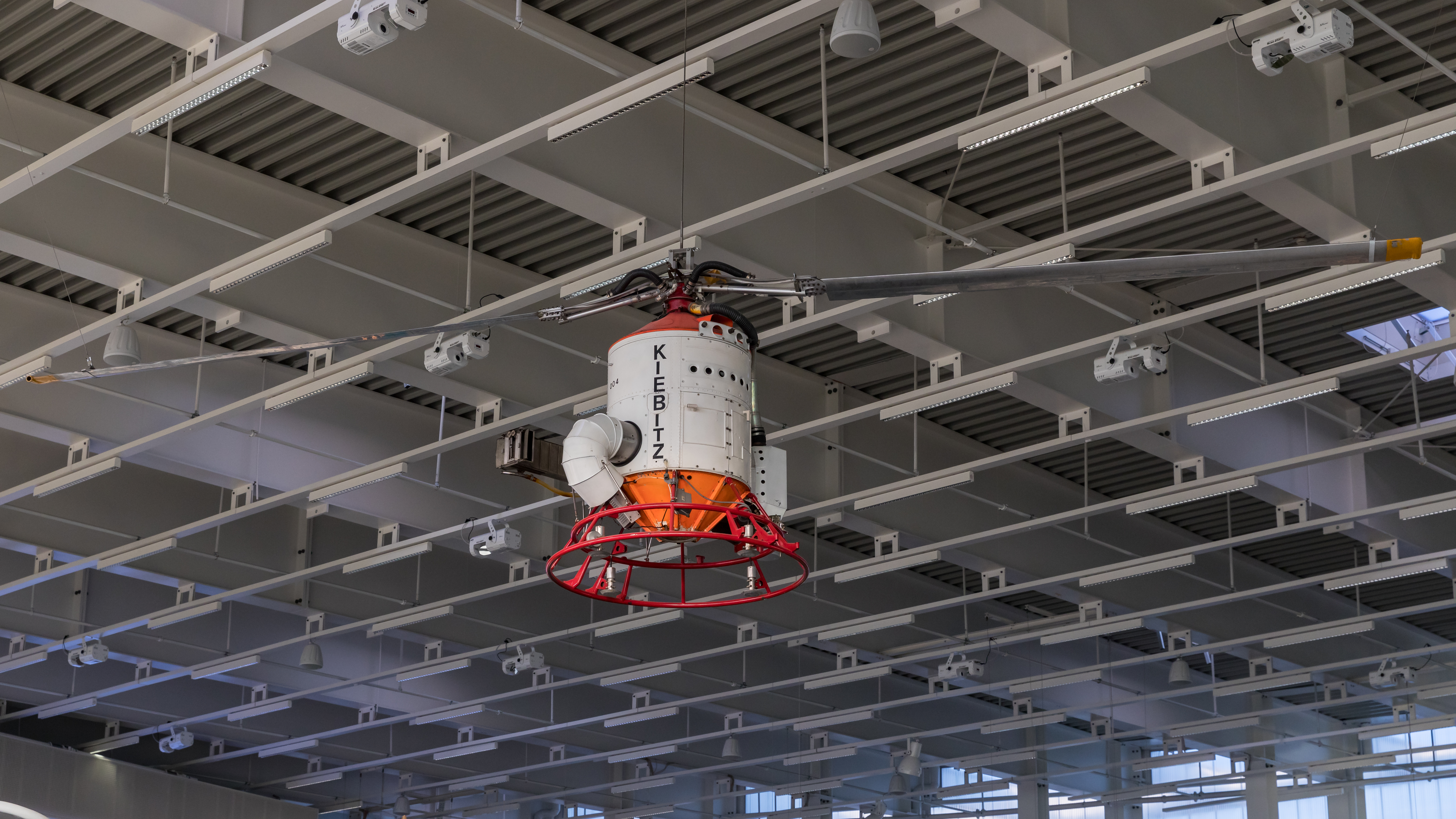
- The Do 32K on display at the Dornier Museum

General information
- Type: Unmanned reconnaissance helicopter
- National origin: Germany
- Manufacturer: Dornier Werke GmbH

History
- First flight: 1970
- Developed from: Dornier Do 32

The Dornier Kiebitz was an unmanned military reconnaissance mobile platform used for battlefield reconnaissance duties such as moving target detection and tracking.

== Variants ==
Do 32K (experimental)
Initial variant using the rotor and BMW 6012 powerplant of the Dornier Do 32 manned helicopter.
Do 32K Kiebitz I (operational)
Tip jet rotor using air from an Allison 250-C2 driven compressor.
Do 34 Kiebitz II
Larger variant, used for ARGUS (Autonomes Radar Gefechtsfeld Uberwachungs System) battlefield reconnaissance system development.

== Specifications (Do 34 Kiebitz) ==
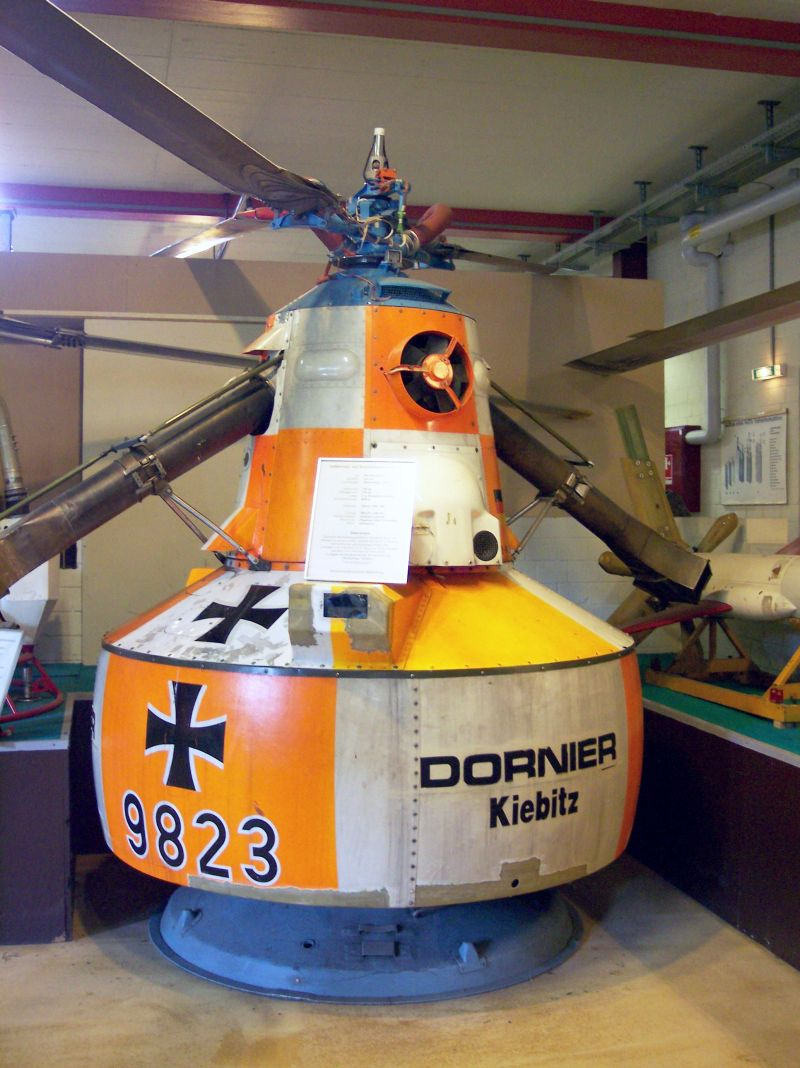
Do 34 Kiebitz II on display at the Wehrtechnische Studiensammlung Koblenz

Data from Jane's All the World's Aircraft 1982-83.

General characteristics

- Crew: Unmanned
- Capacity: 300 m/85 kg of cable
- Diameter: 2 m (6 ft 7 in)
- Height: 2.7 m (8 ft 10 in)
- Empty weight: 350 kg (772 lb)
- Max takeoff weight: 550 kg (1,213 lb)
- Powerplant: 1 × Allison 250-C20B turboshaft, 313 kW (420 hp)
- Main rotor diameter: 8 m (26 ft 3 in)

Performance

- Endurance: More than 24 hours
- Service ceiling: 300 m (980 ft)
- Disk loading: 10.9 kg/m^{2} (2.2 lb/sq ft)

== See also ==
Related development

- Dornier Do 32

Related lists

- List of unmanned aerial vehicles
