= NSU Ro 80 =

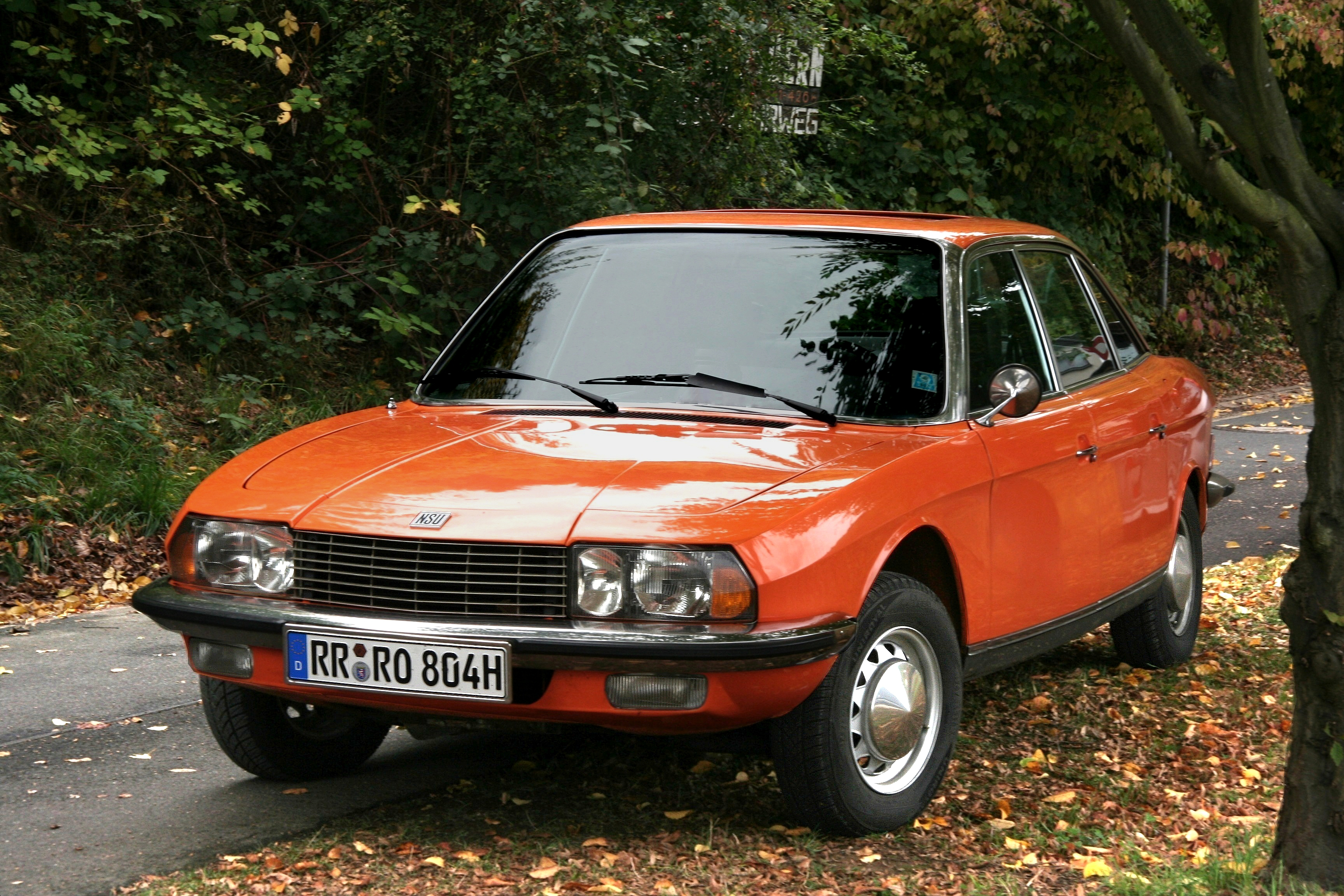

Overview
- Manufacturer: NSU Motorenwerke (1967–1969); Audi NSU Auto Union AG (1969–1977)
- Production: 1967–1977
- Assembly: West Germany: Neckarsulm
- Designer: Claus Luthe

Body and chassis
- Class: Executive car
- Body style: 4-door sedan
- Layout: FF layout

Powertrain
- Engine: 497,5cc x 2 - two-rotor Wankel engine, 115 PS (85 kW; 113 hp)
- Transmission: 3-speed Fichtel & Sachs all-synchromesh manual connected with automatic clutch and F & S torque converter

Dimensions
- Wheelbase: 2,860 mm (112.6 in)
- Length: 4,780 mm (188.2 in)
- Width: 1,760 mm (69.3 in)
- Height: 1,410 mm (55.5 in)
- Curb weight: 1,251–1,292 kg (2,759–2,848 lb)

Chronology
- Successor: Audi 100 (C2)

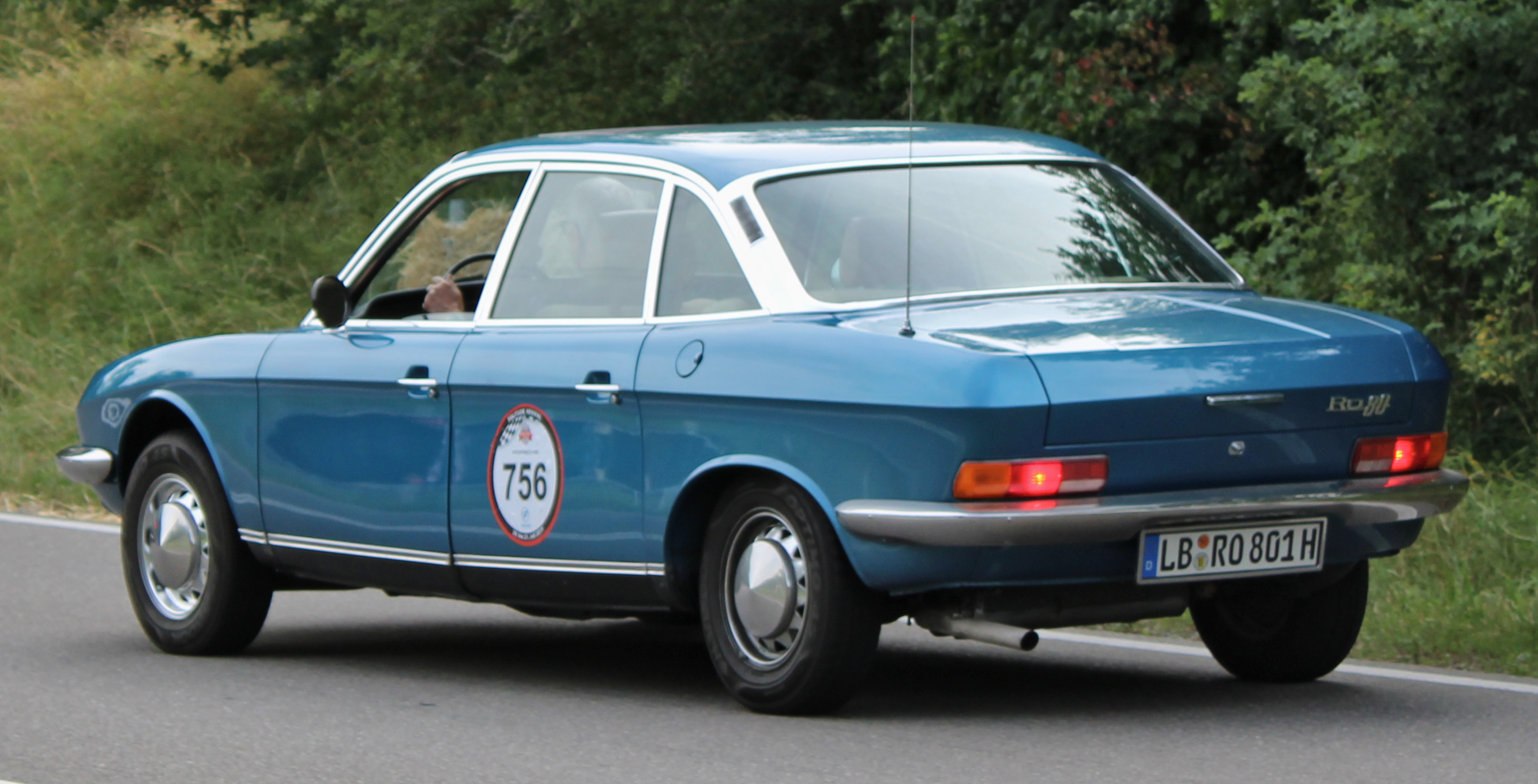
Rear view

The NSU Ro 80 is a four-door, front-engine executive sedan manufactured and marketed by the West German firm NSU from 1967 until 1977.

Noted for innovative, aerodynamic styling by Claus Luthe and a technologically advanced powertrain, the Ro 80 featured a 84 kW (113 bhp), 995 cc (60.7 cu in) twin-rotor Wankel engine driving the front wheels through a semi-automatic transmission with an innovative vacuum-operated clutch system. Engine dimensions (Comotor units): length 412 mm (16.2 in); width 340 mm (13 in), height 340 mm (13 in), weight 101 kg (223 lb). Power 80 kW (107 hp) at 6,500 rpm; torque 137 N⋅m (101 lbf⋅ft) at 3,000 rpm (all figures approximate).

The Ro 80 was voted Car of the Year for 1968 and 37,398 units were manufactured over a ten-year production run, all in a single generation.

== Running gear ==
Other technological features of the Ro 80, aside from the powertrain, were the four-wheel ATE Dunlop disc brakes, which were generally only featured on expensive sports or luxury saloon cars. The front brakes were mounted inboard, reducing the unsprung weight. The suspension was independent on all four wheels, with MacPherson struts at the front and semi-trailing arm suspension at the rear, both of which are space-saving designs commonly used today. Power-assisted ZF rack and pinion steering was used, again foreshadowing more recent designs.

== Transmission ==
The car featured an automatic clutch which was commonly described as a three-speed semi-automatic gearbox: there was no clutch pedal, but instead, touching the gear lever knob operated an internal electric switch that operated a vacuum system which disengaged the clutch. The gear lever itself then could be moved through a standard "H-pattern" gate.

== Styling ==
The styling, by Claus Luthe who was head of design at NSU and later BMW, was considered very modern at the time; the Ro 80 has been part of many gallery exhibits of modern industrial design. The large glass area foreshadowed the 1970s designs such as Citroën's. The shape was also slippery, with a drag coefficient of 0.355 (very low for the era). This allowed for a top speed of 180 km/h (112 mph). Indeed, comparisons have been drawn between the design of the Ro 80 and the aerodynamic 1982 Audi 100 built in the same factory some 15 years later.

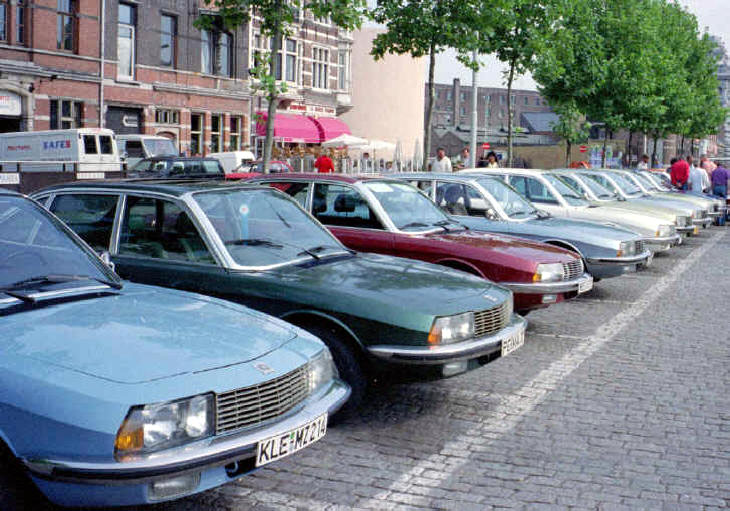
NSU Ro 80 club meeting in Antwerp, 1993

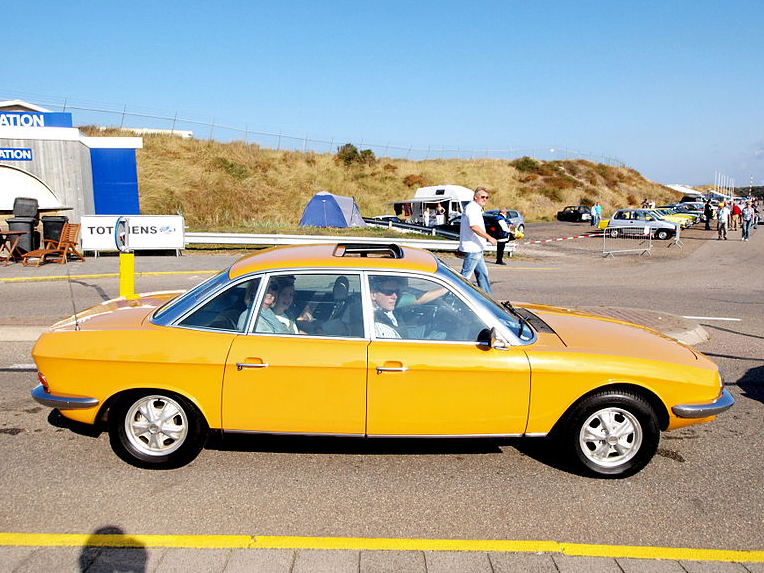
The basic wedge profile of this 1967 design was much emulated in subsequent decades

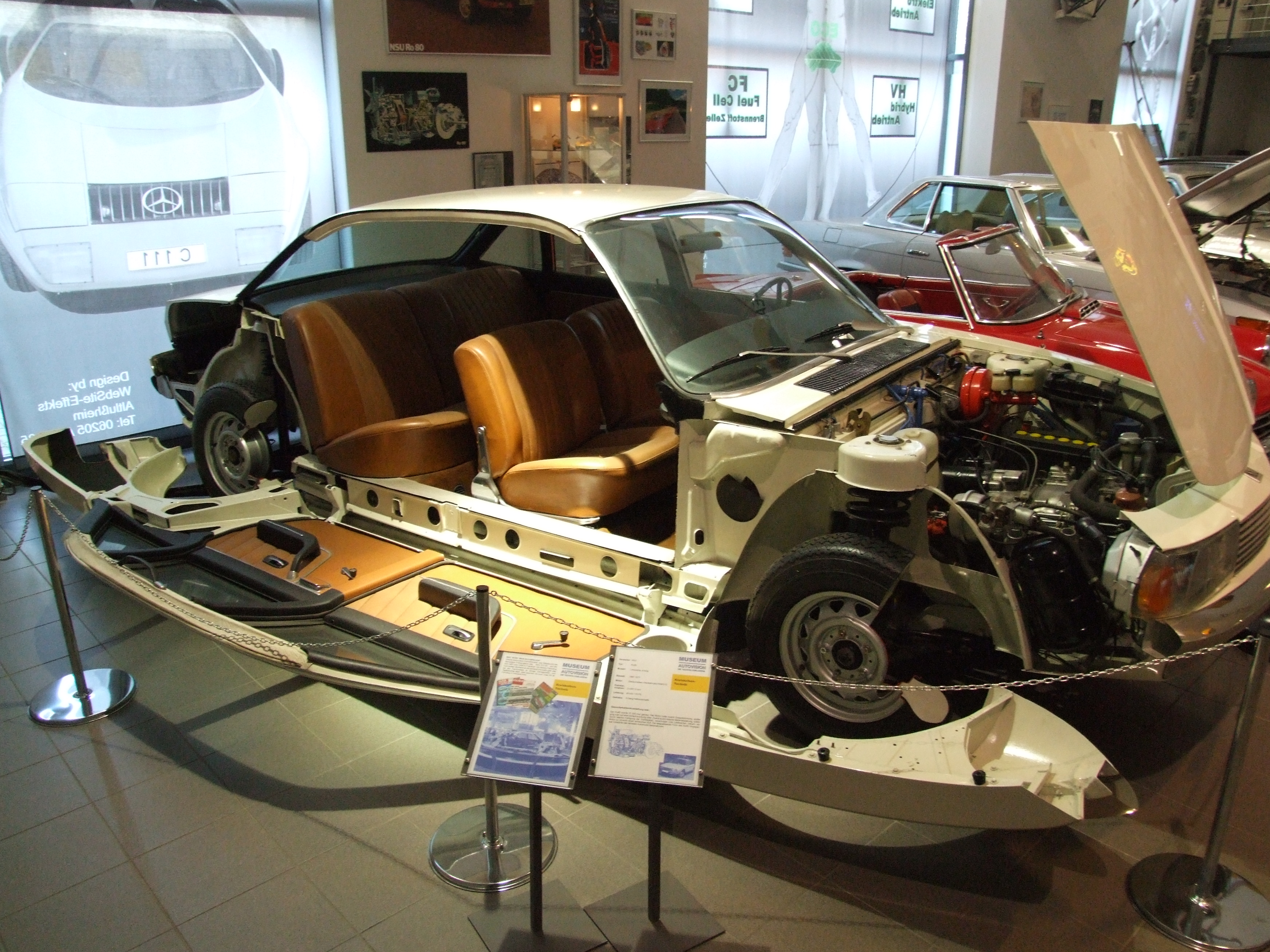
NSU Ro 80, IAA-Modell, Museum Autovision, Altlußheim, Germany

== Interior ==
Interior trim combined cloth-covered seats with PVC headlining and a carpeted floor. Leather seats were a factory option, although rarely specified.

== Evolution ==
The company's limited resources focused on improving the reliability of the rotary engine, with much attention given to the material used for the three rotor tips (apex seals) for the oval-like epitrochoid-shaped rotor housing that sealed the combustion chambers. A feature of the engine was its willingness to rev quickly and quietly to very high engine speeds, but it was precisely at these high speeds that damage to key engine components occurred: all Ro 80s came with a rev counter, but cars produced after 1971 also came with an "acoustical signal" that warned the driver when the engine was rotating too fast.

The Ro 80 remained largely unchanged over its ten-year production. From September 1969 the rectangular headlights were replaced with twin halogen units, and air extractor vents appeared on the C-pillar behind the doors. In August 1970 a slightly reshaped plastic grille replaced the metal grille of the early cars, and a minimal facelift in May 1975 saw the final cars getting enlarged rear lights and rubber inserts in the bumpers which increased the car's overall length by 15 mm to 4,795 mm. The placement of the rear license plate was also changed from below the bumper to above it. This resulted in the boot lid lock being repositioned to the rear lip of the boot lid itself, instead of just below it.

== Unreliability ==
The car developed an early reputation for unreliability. The Ro 80 engine in particular suffered from construction faults, among many other problems, and some early cars required a rebuilt engine before 50,000 kilometres (31,000 mi), with problems arising as early as 24,000 kilometres (15,000 mi). Originally, the rotor tip seals were made in three pieces, out of the same material. The motor's design caused the centre section to wear more quickly at cold starts compared to the other pieces; the worn centrepieces allowed the two other parts of the seal to move, which in turn allowed combustion products to escape the seals. The tip seal centrepiece was then redesigned using ferrotic material, and the problem was entirely resolved. The fact that the rotary engine design had inherently poor fuel economy (typically 13-16 L/100 km) and a poor understanding of the Wankel engine by dealers and mechanics did not help this situation. By the 1970 model year, most of the reliability issues had been resolved, but a necessarily generous warranty policy and damage to the car's reputation had undermined NSU's financial situation irreparably. NSU was acquired by Volkswagen in 1969 and merged with Auto Union to create the modern-day Audi company.

== Production ==
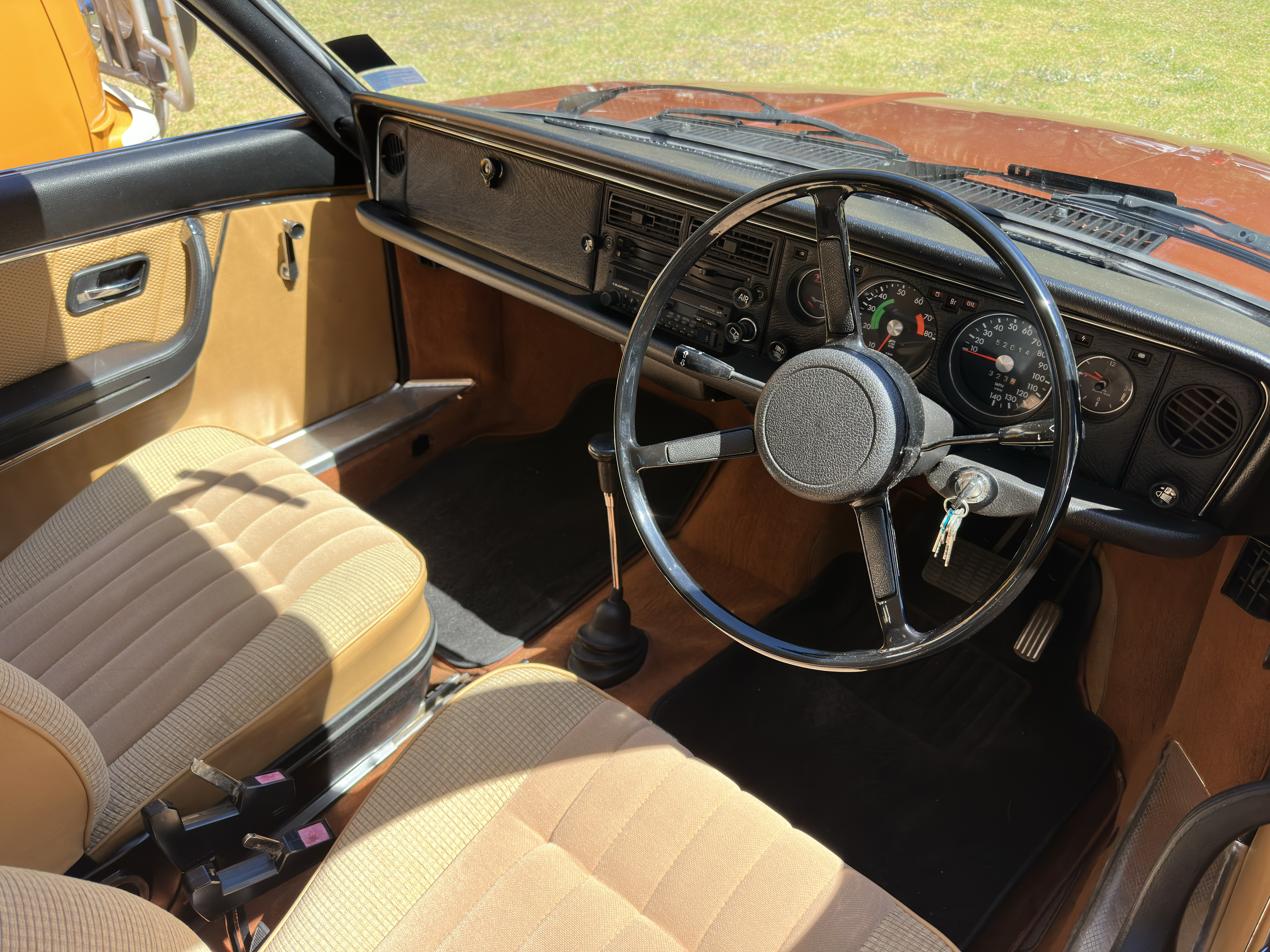
Interior

Series production began in October 1967 and the last examples came off the production line in April 1977.

During 1968, the first full year of production, 5,986 cars were produced, increasing to 7,811 in 1969 and falling slightly to 7,200 in 1970. After this output declined, to about 3,000 - 4,000 per year for the next three years. The relatively high fuel consumption of the rotary engine worked against the car after the dramatic fuel price rises accompanying the oil crisis of 1973, and between 1974 and 1976 annual production came in well below 2,000 units. In total 37,398 Ro80s were produced during the ten-year production run. Ultimately, it was the contrasting success of the similarly sized Audi 100 that sealed both the fate of the Ro 80, and the NSU brand as a whole within the Auto Union-NSU combine, as parent company Volkswagen began nurturing Audi as its performance-luxury brand in the late 1970s. After the discontinuation of the Ro 80 in 1977, the Neckarsulm plant was switched over entirely to producing Audi's C- and D- platform vehicles (the 100/200, and later the Audi A6 and A8), and the NSU brand disappeared from the public eye.

== See also ==
- Citroën GS Birotor
- Citroën M35
- Mazda Cosmo
